= Yokohane Route =

Expressway in the Tokyo area

Shuto Expressway Yokohane Route 首都高速神奈川1号横羽線

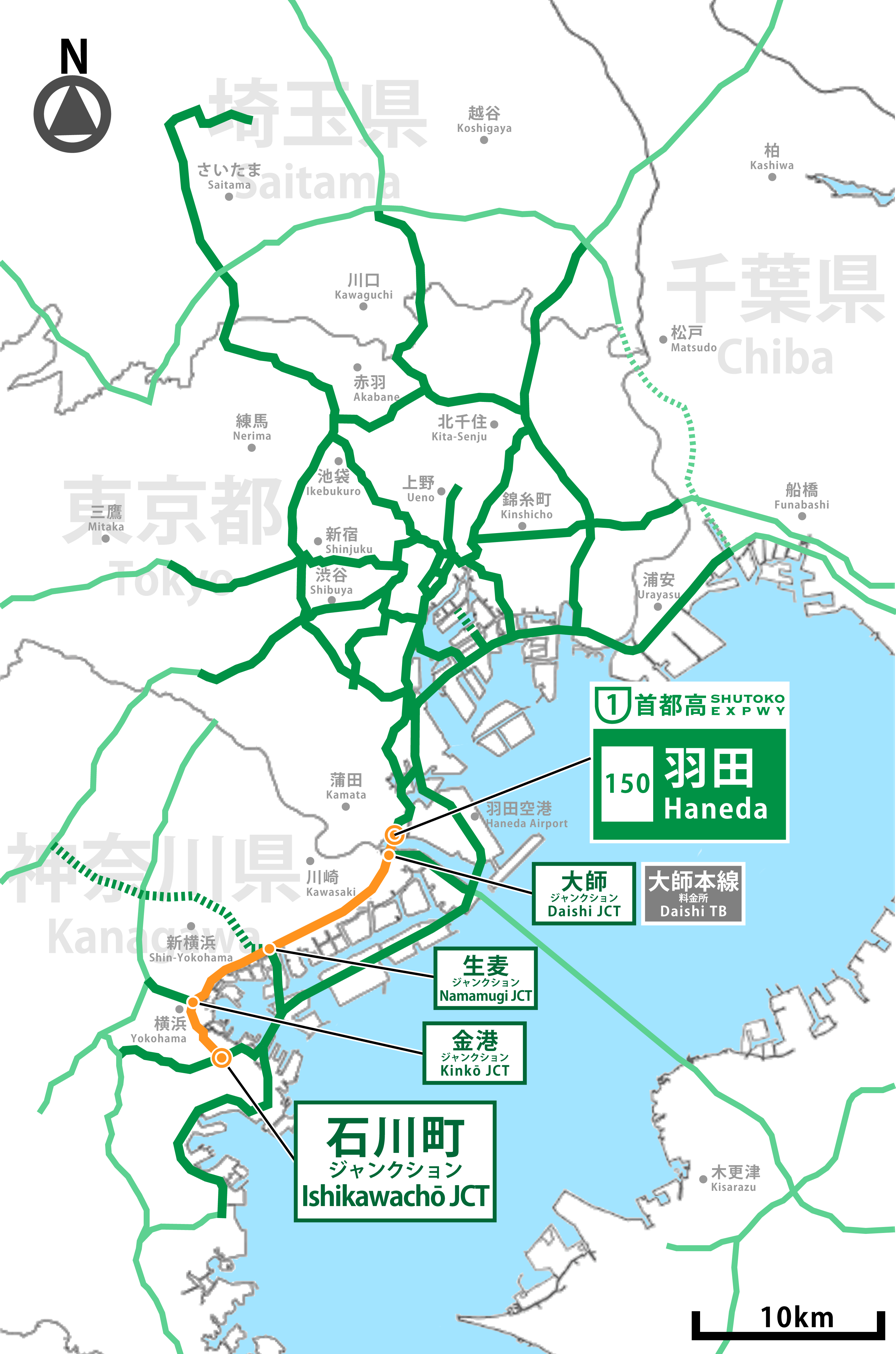
- The Yokohane Route is highlighted in orange

Route information
- Maintained by Metropolitan Expressway Company Limited
- Length: 19.7 km (12.2 mi)
- Existed: 1968–present

Major junctions
- North end: Haneda entrance/exit in Ōta, Tokyo; Haneda Route
- South end: Ishikawachō Junction in Naka-ku, Yokohama, Kanagawa; Kariba Route

Location
- Country: Japan

Highway system
- National highways of Japan; Expressways of Japan

The Yokohane Route (横羽線, Yokohane-sen), signed as Route K1, is one of the tolled routes of the Shuto Expressway system serving the Greater Tokyo Area and is one of seven of the routes in the system serving Kanagawa Prefecture. The route is a 19.7-kilometer (12.2 mi) long radial highway running southwest from the southern terminus of the Haneda Route in Ōta near Haneda International Airport in Tokyo to the Kariba Route in Naka-ku, Yokohama in Kanagawa Prefecture. Alongside the Haneda Route, it connects Tokyo's Inner Circular Route in central Tokyo to Yokohama.

== Route description ==
Route K1 begins at the Haneda interchange in Ōta as a continuation south for the Haneda Route into Kanagawa Prefecture. From this northern terminus, it travels southwest out of Tokyo, crossing in to the eastern part of the city of Kawasaki in Kanagawa Prefecture. The largest junction along the Yokohane Route in Kawasaki is at Daishi Junction where the highway meets the Kawasaki Route at its western terminus. In Yokohama, the expressway intersects the Yokohama North Route, the Daikoku Route, National Route 15, the Mitsuzawa Route, and National Route 1. Route K1 meets its southern terminus at Ishikawachō Junction with the Kariba Route.

The speed limit along almost the entire length of the Yokohane Route is set at 60 km/h. The only exception is at the southern terminus of the route between Yokohama-kōen and Ishikawachō Junction where the limit is lowered to 50 km/h.

== History ==
The first section of the Yokohane Route was opened to traffic on 19 July 1968 between the interchanges at Asada and Higashikanagawa. Later that year, on 28 November, the expressway was extended north to its current northern terminus at Haneda. Next it was extended south to Kinkō Junction on 7 August 1972. It was extended further to the south, terminating at an interchange at Yokohama-kōen on 7 March 1978. The Yokohane Route was completed upon completion of its extension south to its southern terminus at Ishikawachō Junction on 2 February 1984. Work began in 2015 to replace the Daichi Bridge that carries that expressway over the Tama River after fatigue cracks were found throughout the old bridge. The replacement project is set to be completed in 2023.

== Gallery ==
Yokohane Route

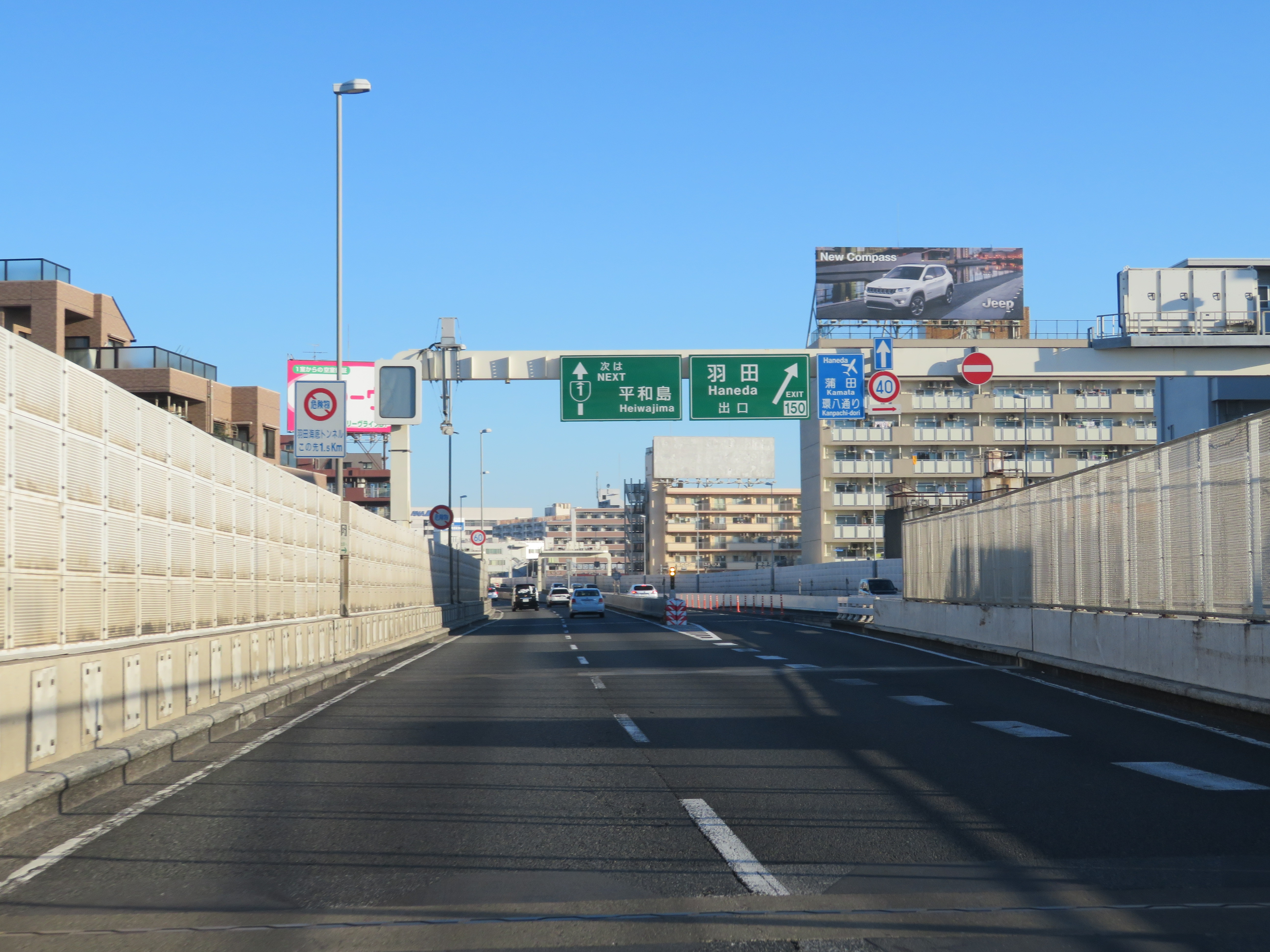
The northern terminus of the route at Haneda

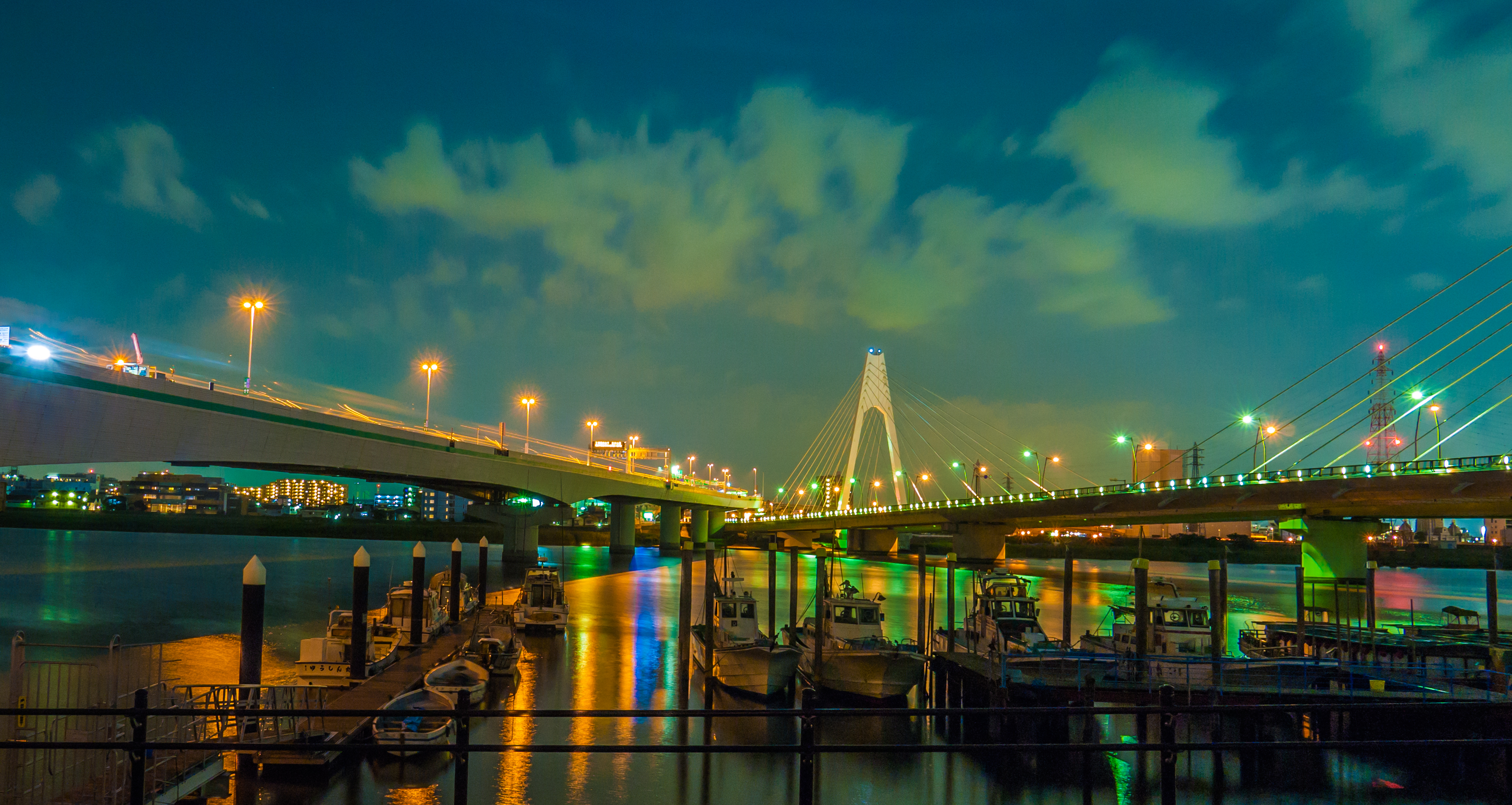
The Daishi Bridge over the Tama River. The Yokohane Route is carried by the bridges on the left. While Tonomachi-dōri is carried by the bridges on the right

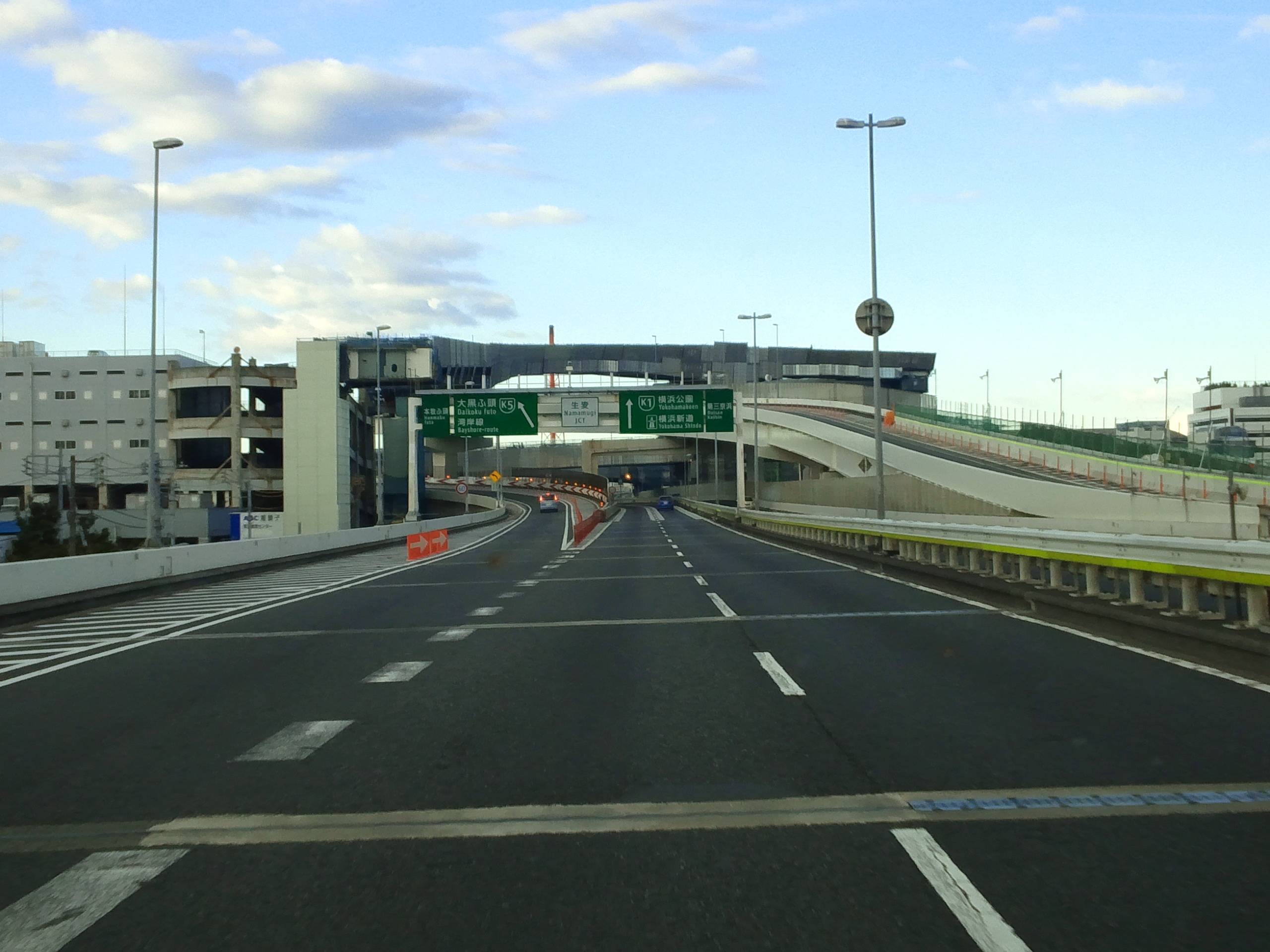
Namamugi Junction

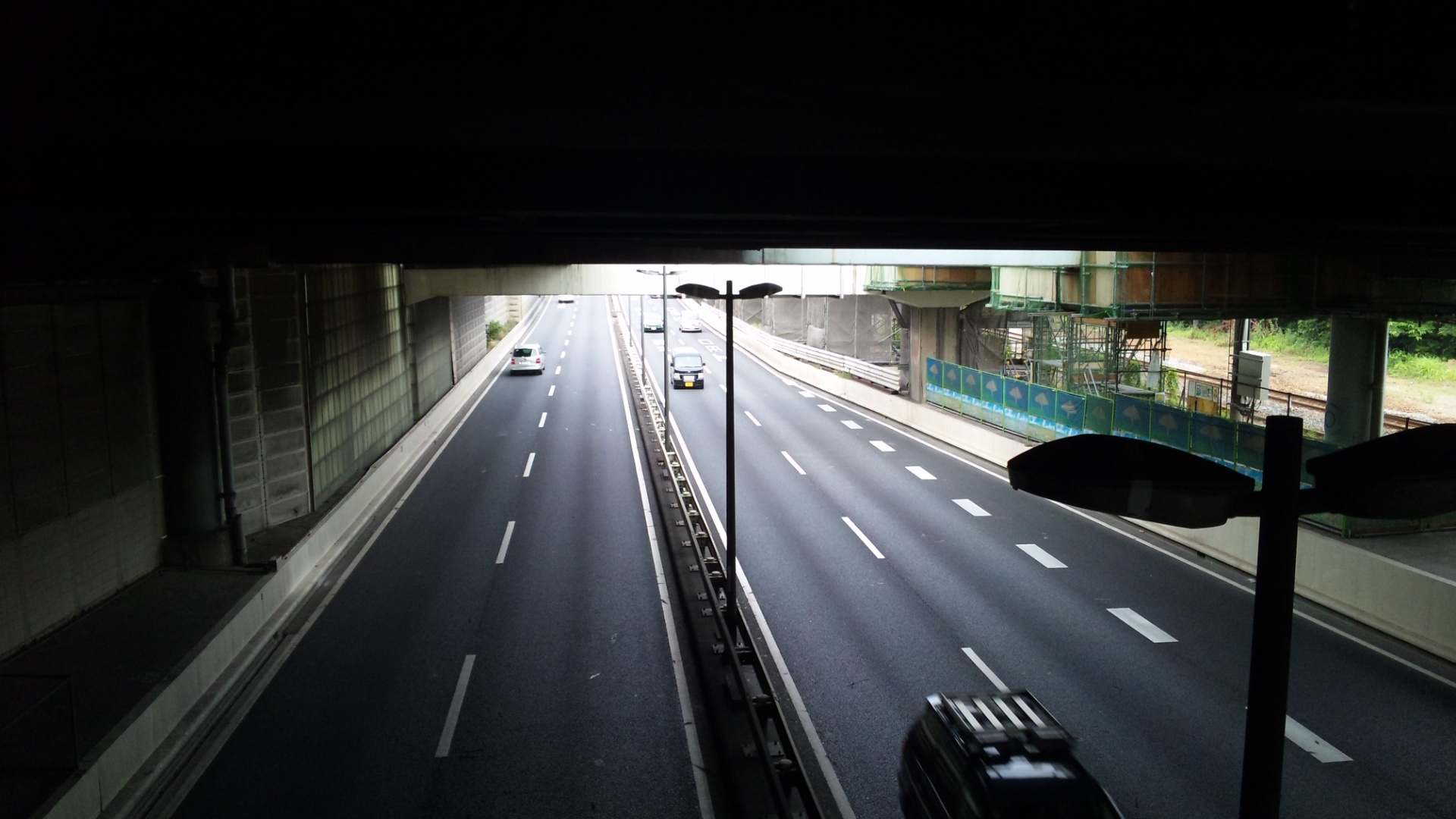
The expressway near Koyasu

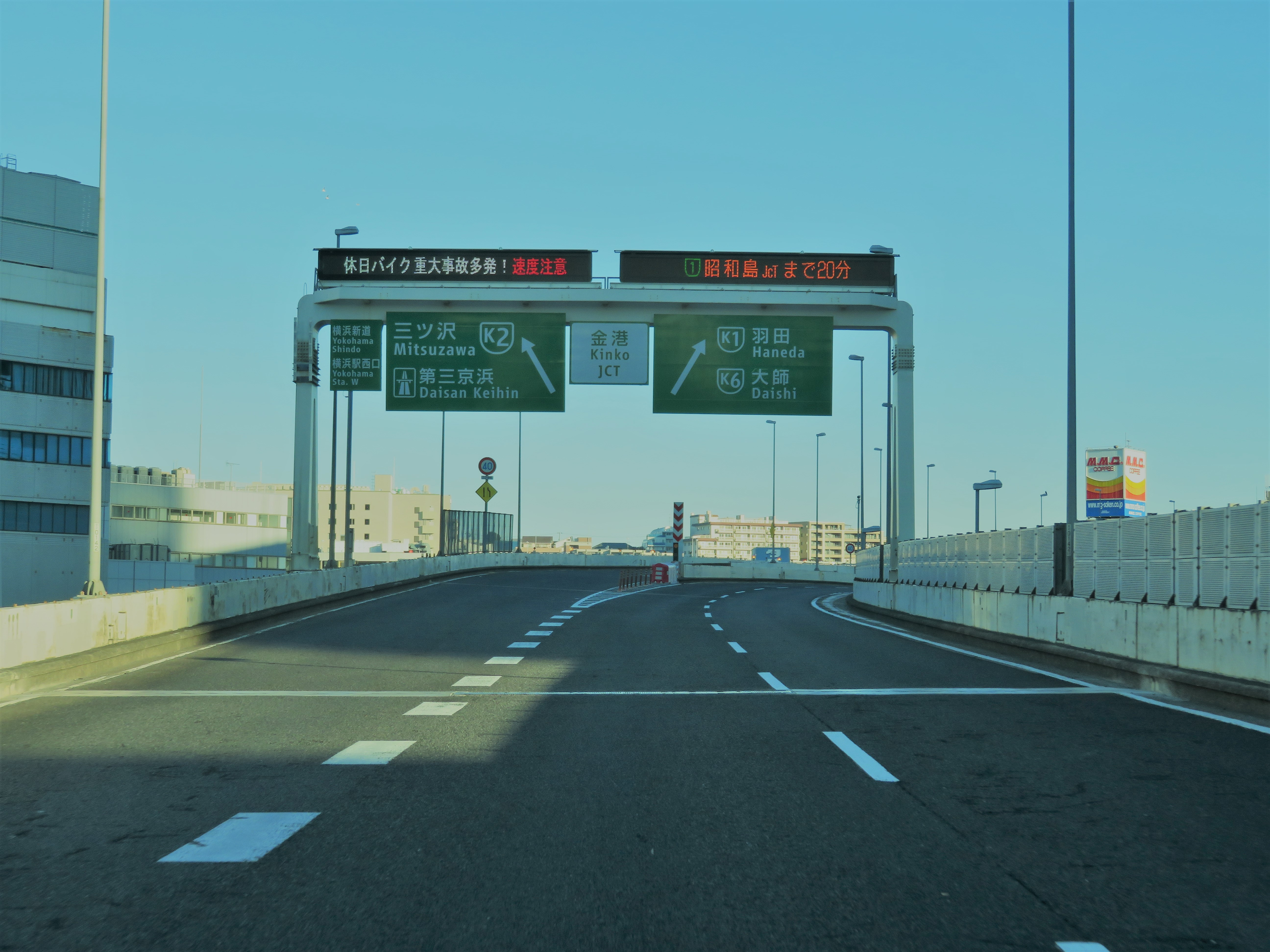
Kinkō Junction

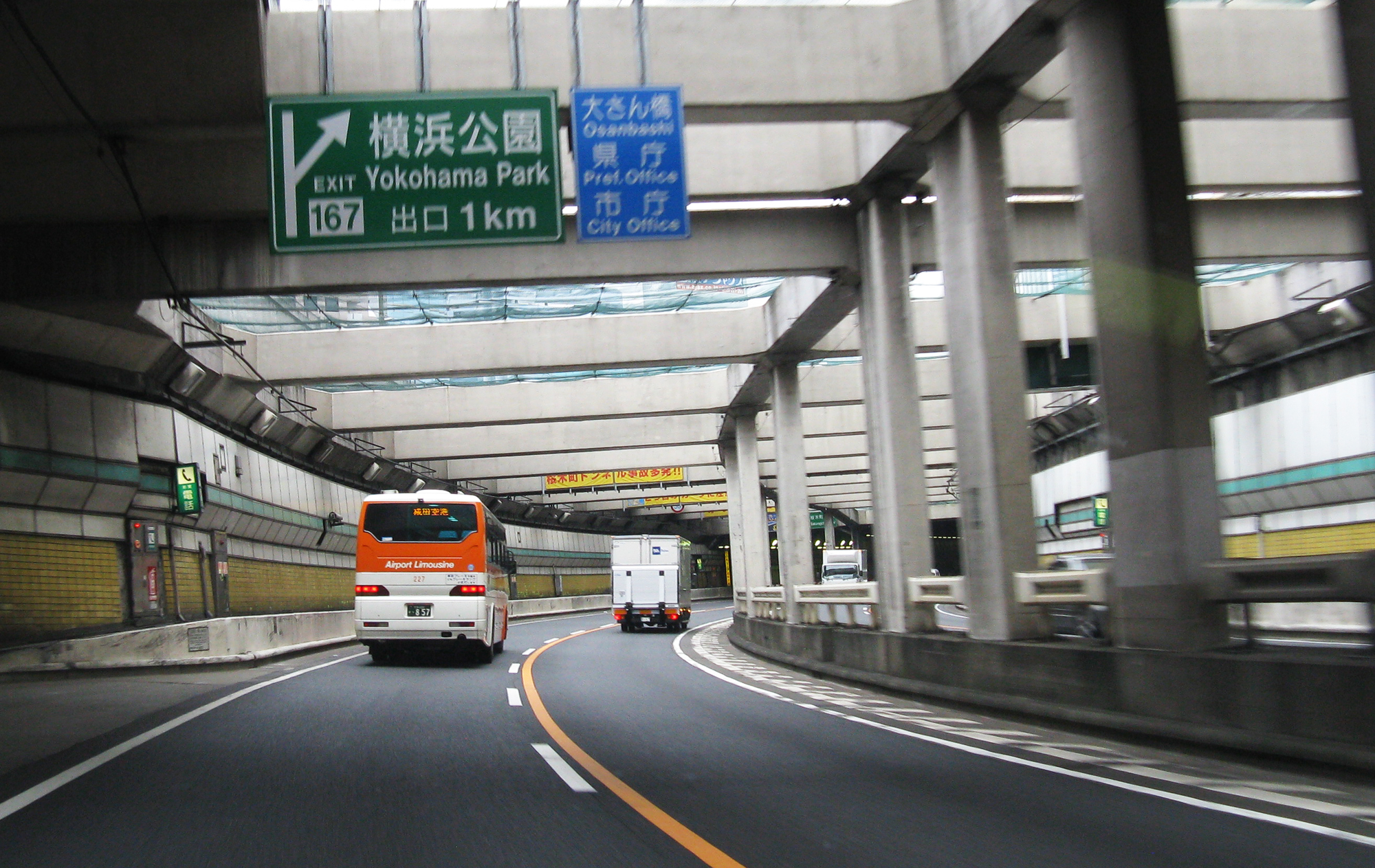
The expressway near its southern terminus

== Junction list ==
Prefecture	Location	km	mi	Exit	Name	Destinations	Notes
Tokyo	Ōta	0.0	0.0	150	Haneda	National Route 131 / Tokyo Metropolitan Route 311 (Kanpachi-dōri) – Haneda, Kamata; Haneda Route – to Inner Circular Route	Northern terminus, expressway continues north as the Haneda Route
Kanagawa	Kawasaki	0.4	0.25	151	Daishi	Kanagawa Prefecture Route 6 (Tonomachi-dōri) – to National Route 409, Ukishima, Central Kawasaki	Southbound exit, northbound entrance
Kanagawa	Kawasaki	0.5	0.31	—	~~Daishi Toll Booth/Parking Area~~		Closed May 11, 2026
Kanagawa	Kawasaki	0.7	0.43	152A	Daishi	National Route 409 (Daishi Michi) – Kawasaki Station, Ukishima; Kawasaki Route – to Bayshore Route, Tokyo Bay Aqua-Line	Southbound entrance, northbound exit; western terminus of the Kawasaki Route
Kanagawa	Kawasaki	4.5	2.8	153	Hamakawasaki	Kanagawa Prefecture Route 6 (Sangyo-dōro) – Minamisaiwaichō, Asadachō	Southbound exit, northbound entrance
Kanagawa	Kawasaki	6.4	4.0	152	Asada	Kanagawa Prefecture Route 6 (Sangyo-dōro) – Ikeda, Kawasaki Station	Southbound entrance, northbound exit
Kanagawa	Yokohama	7.4	4.6	155	Shiori	Kanagawa Prefecture Route 6 (Sangyo-dōro) – Tsurumi Station	Southbound exit, northbound entrance
Kanagawa	Yokohama	9.1	5.7	—	Namamugi	Yokohama North Route west – to Daisan-Keihin Road, Shin-Yokohama; Daikoku Route south – to Bayshore Route	
Kanagawa	Yokohama	9.7	6.0	154	Namamugi	Kanagawa Prefecture Route 6 (Sangyo-dōro) – to National Route 15, Daikoku Wharf, Tsurumi Station	Southbound entrance, northbound exit
Kanagawa	Yokohama	10.6	6.6	157	Moriyachō	Kanagawa Prefecture Route 6 (Sangyo-dōro) – Ebisuchō, Moriyachō	Southbound exit, northbound entrance
Kanagawa	Yokohama	10.8	6.7	159,160	Koyasu	Frontage road – to Daiichi-Keihin, Ebisuchō, Moriyachō, Shinkoyasu	
Kanagawa	Yokohama	12.6	7.8	161,162	Higashikanagawa	National Route 15 (Daiichi-Keihin) – Rokkakubashi, Mizuho Wharf	
Kanagawa	Yokohama	14.0	8.7	—	Kinkō	Mitsuzawa Route west – to Daisan-Keihin Road, Yokohama Shindō, Yokohama Station	Eastern terminus of the Mitsuzawa Route
Kanagawa	Yokohama	14.1	8.8	164	Yokohama Station East Entrance	National Route 1 (Tōkaidō) – Aokibashi, Yokohama Portside, Underground square	
Kanagawa	Yokohama	15.3	9.5	165,166	Minatomirai	Ichō-dōri – Sakuragichō, Conference Center	Part of this interchange was previously known as Midorichō Ramp before it was upgraded into a full interchange
Kanagawa	Yokohama	19.0	11.8	167,168	Yokohama-kōen		
Kanagawa	Yokohama	19.7	12.2	—	Ishikawachō	Kariba Route – to Bayshore Route, Tokyo Bay Aqua-Line	Southern terminus
1.000 mi = 1.609 km; 1.000 km = 0.621 mi: Incomplete access; Route transition
