= E83 =

E83 may refer to:

- European route E83, a road
- Panno variation of the King's Indian Defence, Sämisch Variation, Encyclopaedia of Chess Openings code
- Daisan Keihin Road and Yokohama Shindō, route E83 in Japan
