= Mitsuzawa Route =

Expressway in the Tokyo area

Shuto Expressway Mitsuzawa Route 首都高速神奈川2号三ツ沢線

Route information
- Maintained by Metropolitan Expressway Company Limited
- Length: 2.3 km (1.4 mi)
- Existed: 1972–present

Major junctions
- East end: Kinkō Junction in Tsurumi-ku, Yokohama; Yokohane Route
- West end: Mitsuzawa Junction in Tsuzuki-ku, Yokohama; Daisan Keihin Road / Yokohama Shindō

Location
- Country: Japan

Highway system
- National highways of Japan; Expressways of Japan

The Mitsuzawa Route (三ツ沢線, Mitsuzawa-sen), signed as Route K2, is one of the tolled routes of the Shuto Expressway system serving the Greater Tokyo Area and is one of seven of the routes in the system serving Kanagawa Prefecture. The route is a 2.3-kilometer (1.4 mi) long expressway running west from a junction with the Yokohane Route in Kanagawa-ku, Yokohama, to the Daisan Keihin Road and the Yokohama Shindō in Hodogaya-ku, Yokohama in Kanagawa Prefecture. It serves as a radial route running west from central Yokohama.

== Route description ==
The Mitsuzawa Route links central Yokohama and the Yokohane Route to the southwestern suburbs of Tokyo, primarily Setagaya, by way of the Daisan Keihin Road. Route K2 begins at Kinkō Junction in Nishi-ku traveling west from the Yokohane Route. From this eastern terminus, it travels west through the northern limits of the ward, curving slightly to the northwest. It passes beneath Mitsuzawa Park near NHK Spring Mitsuzawa Football Stadium where it crosses in to Kanagawa-ku where it has a junction with Kanagawa Prefecture Route 13. Next it enters Hodogaya-ku. In this ward Route K2 meets its western terminus at Mitsuzawa Junction where it transitions into the Daisan Keihin Road with access also to the Yokohama Shindō.

The speed limit along almost the entirety of the Mitsuzawa Route is set at 60 km/h.

== History ==
The first section of the Mitsuzawa Route was opened to traffic on 7 August 1972. It was a 0.6-kilometer (0.37 mi) long segment between the route's eastern terminus at Kinkō Junction and the interchange at Yokohama-eki-nishiguchi. The second a final section of the expressway to be opened was a segment that is located between the interchange at Yokohama-eki-nishiguchi and the route's western terminus at Mitsuzawa Junction. It was opened on 7 March 1978, completing the expressway.

== Junction list ==
The entire expressway lies within Yokohama in Kanagawa Prefecture.

Location	km	mi	Exit	Name	Destinations	Notes
Nishi-ku	0.0	0.0	—	Kinkō	Yokohane Route – Haneda, Tokyo Bay Aqua-Line, Kawasaki Route, Yokohama-kōen, Bayshore Route	Eastern terminus
Nishi-ku	0.6	0.37	251	Yokohama-eki-nishiguchi	Kanjō 1 (Old Tōkaidō) – Sengenchō	Westbound exit, eastbound entrance
Nishi-ku	1.4	0.87		Mitsuzawa Toll Booth		Eastbound traffic only
Kanagawa-ku	1.8	1.1	253	Mitsuzawa	Kanagawa Prefecture Route 13 – Sengenchō, Mitsuzawa Park	
Hodogaya-ku	2.3	1.4	—	Mitsuzawa	Yokohama Shindō – Totsuka, Fujisawa; Daisan Keihin Road – Tokyo, Setagaya	Western terminus; expressway continues north as the Daisan Keihin Road
1.000 mi = 1.609 km; 1.000 km = 0.621 mi: Incomplete access; Route transition
