= Kariba Route =

Expressway in the Tokyo area

Shuto Expressway Kariba Route
- 首都高速神奈川3号狩場線

Route information
- Maintained by Metropolitan Expressway Company Limited
- Length: 8.6 km (5.3 mi)
- Existed: 1984–present

Major junctions
- East end: Honmoku Junction in Naka-ku, Yokohama; Bayshore Route
- Yokohane Route
- West end: Kariba Junction in Hodogaya-ku, Yokohama; Yokohama–Yokosuka Road; Yokohama Shindō

Location
- Country: Japan

Highway system
- National highways of Japan; Expressways of Japan

The Kariba Route (狩場線, Kariba-sen), signed as Route K3, is one of the tolled routes of the Shuto Expressway system serving the Greater Tokyo Area and is one of seven of the routes in the system serving Kanagawa Prefecture. The route is a 8.6-kilometer (5.3 mi) long radial highway running west from the Bayshore Route in Naka-ku, Yokohama near Haneda International Airport in Tokyo to the Yokohama Yokosuka Road and the Yokohama Shindō in Hodogaya-ku, Yokohama. Alongside the Yokohama Yokosuka Road, it connects central Yokohama to the Tōmei Expressway and the Bayshore Route which, in turn, connect to the rest of the Greater Tokyo Area and points beyond.

== Route description ==
Route K3 begins at Honmoku Junction in Naka-ku traveling west to central Yokohama from the Bayshore Route. From this eastern terminus, it travels west through central Yokohama as an elevated highway over the Nakamura River. At Ishikawachō Junction it has an interchange with the southern terminus of the Yokohane Route. Continuing west the expressway enters Minami-ku, where it has some junctions with various municipal and prefecture roads. At Hanaoki, the Kariba Route leaves the Nakamura River curving to the northwest, eventually entering Hodogaya-ku. In this ward Route K3 meets its western terminus at Kariba Junction where it merges into the Yokohama Yokosuka Road and the Yokohama Shindō.

The speed limit along almost the first 5.1 kilometers (3.2 mi) of the Kariba Route from the Bayshore Route to Hanaoki is set at 50 km/h. The remainder of the route between Hananoki and the route's western terminus at Kariba Junction has a speed limit that is increased to 60 km/h.

== History ==
The first section of the Kariba Route was opened to traffic on 2 February 1984 between the interchanges at Shin-yamashita and Yokohama-kōen. The expressway was extended direction to its eastern terminus at Honmoku Junction where it meets the Bayshore Route on 27 September 1987 upon the completion of the Yokohama Bay Bridge along the Bayhore Route. Next, it was extended west to Kariba Junction, the expressway's western terminus, on 20 March 1990.

== Junction list ==
The entire expressway lies within Yokohama in Kanagawa Prefecture

Location	km	mi	Exit	Name	Destinations	Notes
Naka-ku	0.0	0.0	—	Honmoku	Bayshore Route – Haneda, Daikoku Futo, Urayasu, Daikoku Route, Tokyo Bay Aqua-Line, Yokohama Yokosuka Road, Sachiura, Sugita	Eastern terminus
Naka-ku	1.5	0.93	351/352	Shin-yamashita	Yamashita Park, Honmoku Wharf, China Town, Motomachi	No access from traffic traveling on the westbound ramp from northbound Bayshore Route
Naka-ku	1.5	0.93	354	Yamashitachō		Westbound entrance; exit from southbound Yokohane Route
Naka-ku	2.3	1.4	353	Ishikawachō	Yokohane Route north – Haneda Airport, Minato Mirai; Shin-Yokohama-dōri	Southern terminus of the Yokohane Route; eastbound entrance only from Shin-Yokohama-dōri
Minami-ku	4.5	2.8	356	Bandōbashi	Yokohama City Route 6 – Kannai Station, City Hall	Westbound entrance, eastbound exit
Minami-ku	5.1	3.2	357	Hananoki	Kanagawa Prefecture Route 218 6 – Minamiōta, Kamiōoka	Westbound exit, eastbound entrance
Minami-ku	6.5	4.0	359	Nagata	Kanagawa Prefecture Route 218 6 – Hodogaya, Idogaya	Westbound exit, eastbound entrance
Hodogaya-ku	7.3	4.5		Kariba Toll Booth		Eastbound traffic only
Hodogaya-ku	8.6	5.3	—	Kariba	Yokohama–Yokosuka Road; Yokohama Shindō	Western terminus
1.000 mi = 1.609 km; 1.000 km = 0.621 mi: Incomplete access
