= Yokohama North Route =

Expressway in the Tokyo area

Shuto Expressway Yokohama North Route 首都高速神奈川7号横浜北線
- Yokohama North Route highlighted in red

Route information
- Maintained by Metropolitan Expressway Company Limited
- Length: 8.2 km (5.1 mi)
- Existed: 2017–present

Major junctions
- East end: Namamugi Junction in Tsurumi-ku, Yokohama; Yokohane Route; Daikoku Route
- National Route 1
- West end: Yokohama-Kōhoku Junction in Tsuzuki-ku, Yokohama; Daisan Keihin Road; Yokohama Northwest Route

Location
- Country: Japan

Highway system
- National highways of Japan; Expressways of Japan

The Yokohama North Route (横浜北線, Yokohama-kita-sen), signed as Route K7, is one of the tolled routes of the Shuto Expressway system serving the Greater Tokyo Area and is one of seven of the routes in the system serving Kanagawa Prefecture. The route is a 8.2-kilometer (5.1 mi) long expressway running west from the northern terminus of the Daikoku Route at a junction with the Yokohane Route in Tsurumi-ku, Yokohama, to the Daisan Keihin Road in Tsuzuki-ku, Yokohama in Kanagawa Prefecture. Alongside the Daikoku Route, it connects northern Yokohama to the region-spanning Bayshore Route.

== Route description ==
The Yokohama North Route begins at Namamugi Junction with the Yokohane and Daikoku routes in Tsurumi Ward near the mouth of the Tsurumi River. From there it travels west through Tsurumi where it enters a tunnel that carries the majority of the length of the expressway. At the eastern entrance to the tunnel the expressway has a partial interchange with National Route 1. The tunnel, named the Yokohama-kita Tunnel, is a 5.9-kilometer (3.7 mi) long, twin-bore tunnel that travels at a maximum of 40 meters (130 ft) below the surface. At the western entrance to the tunnel there is another interchange, this one is with Kanagawa Prefecture Route 13. This is also the point where the ramps to and from the Daisan Keihin Road begin and end. The expressway terminates at that highway, but also has access to the local streets in the Tsuzuki Ward where it ends.

The speed limit along the entire length of the Yokohama North Route is set at 60 km/h.

== History ==
The entirety of the Yokohama North Route was opened to traffic on 18 March 2017 instead of being opened in phases like many of the other routes in the Shuto Expressway network. The only addition to the route since its initial opening date is the interchange at Baba, which will open in 2019. The Yokohama North Route was connected the Yokohama Northwest Route, opened by the Metropolitan Expressway Company on 22 March 2020. The new expressway connected the Bayshore Route to the Tōmei Expressway.

== Gallery ==
Yokohama North Route

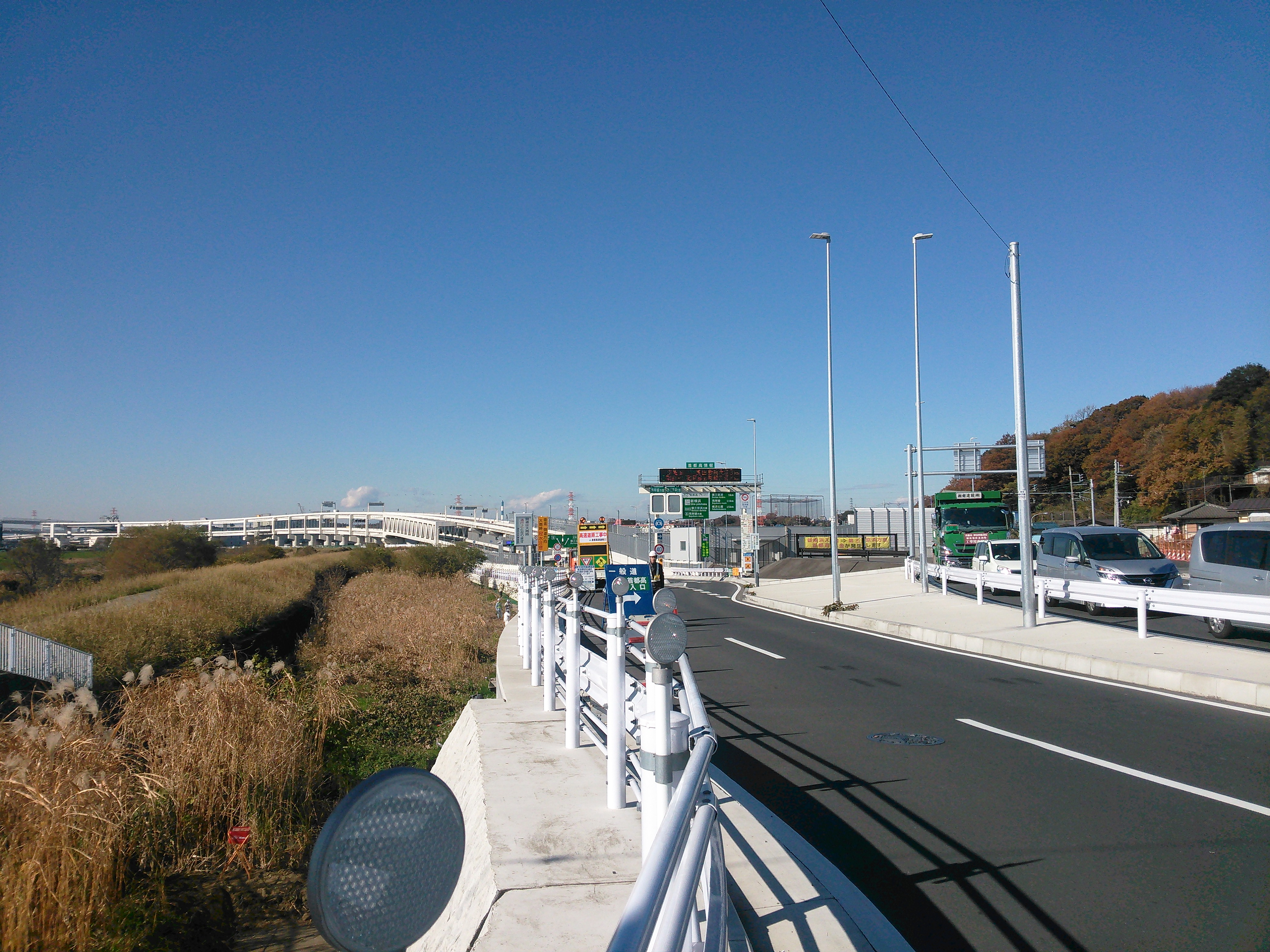
Shin-Yokohama entrance in Kōhoku-ku

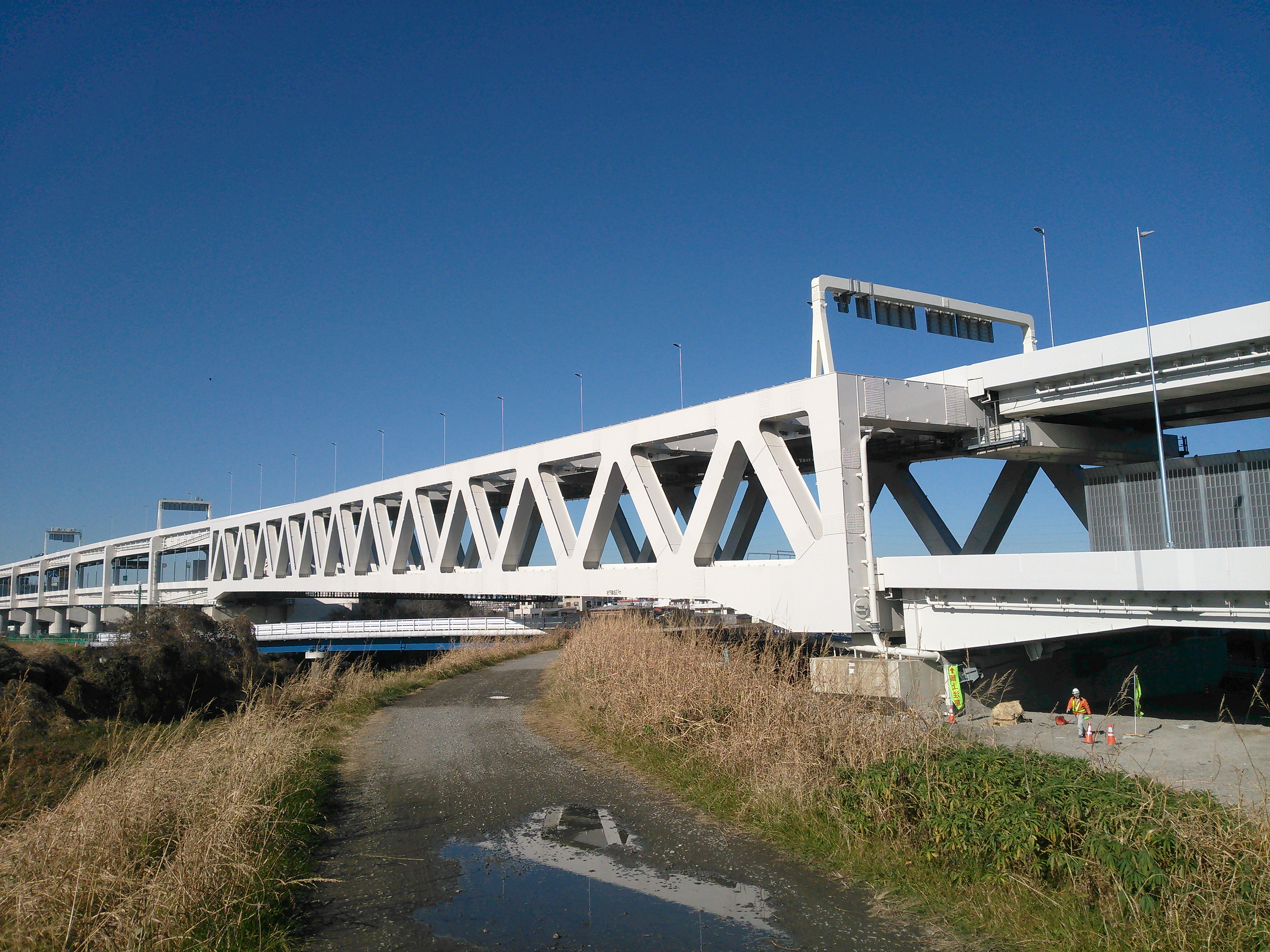
The Okuma River Truss bridge

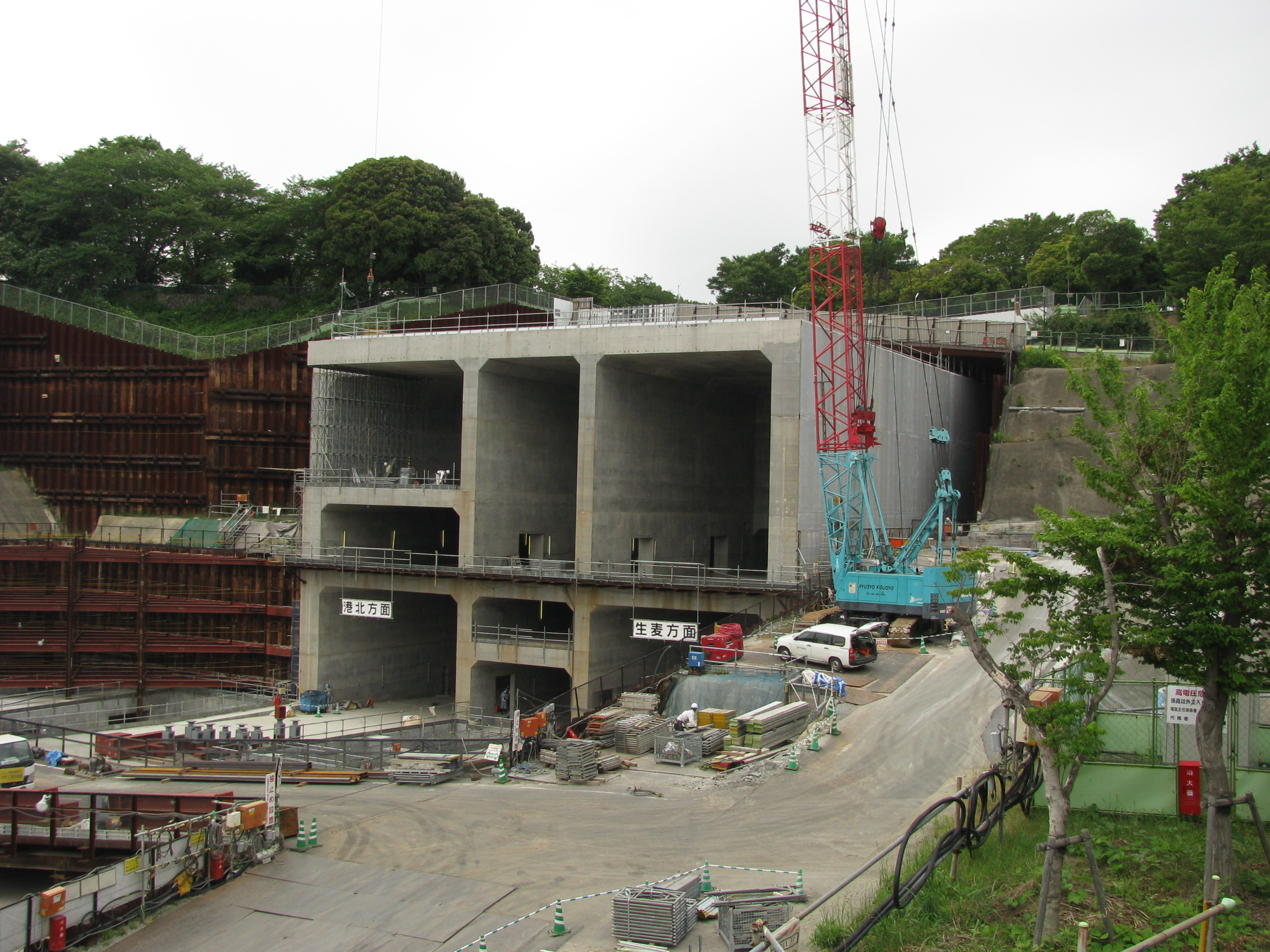
Construction of the tunnel section of the Yokohama North Route in 2011

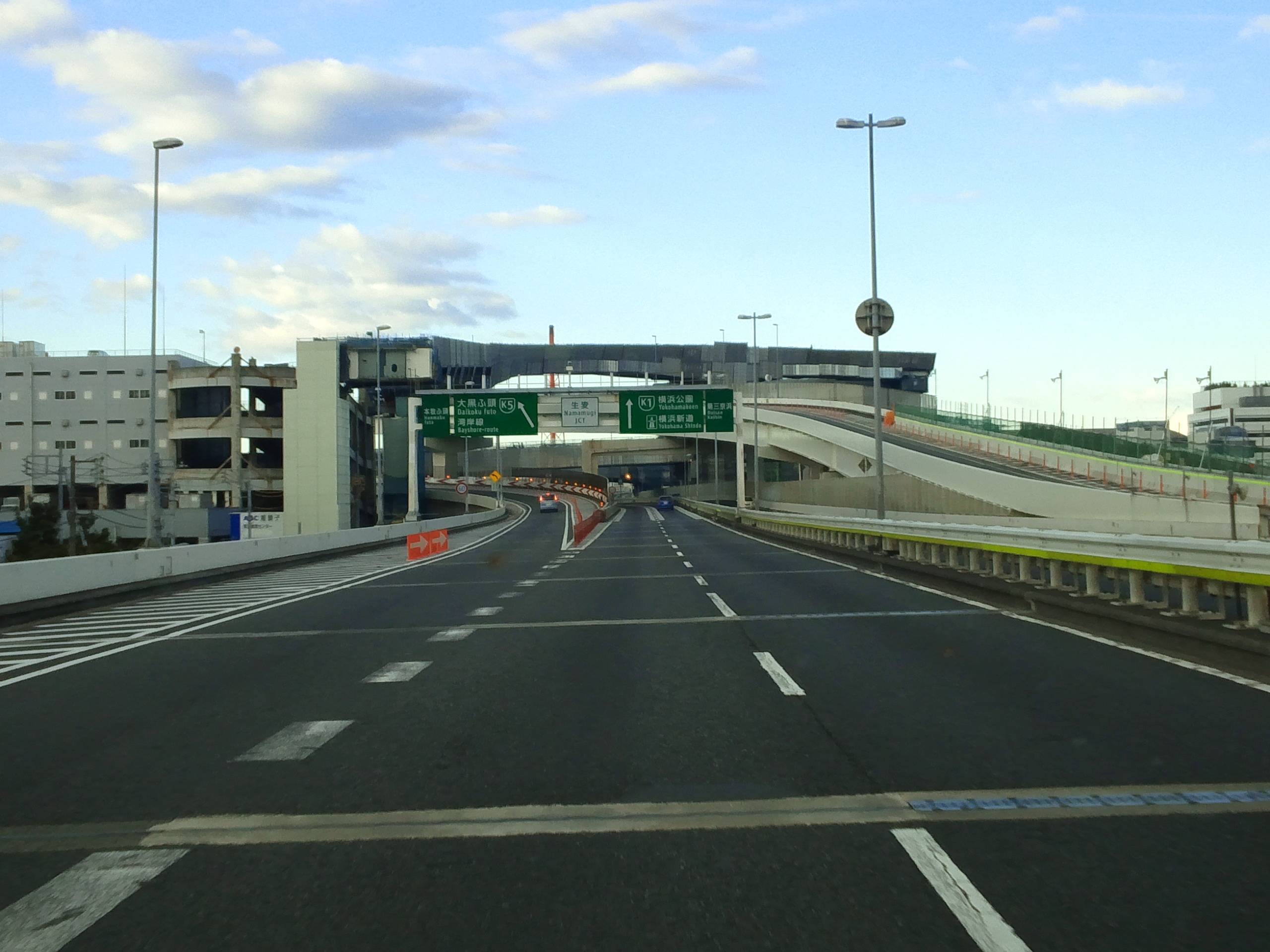
The eastern terminus of the expressway at Namamugi Junction

== Junction list ==
The entire expressway lies within Yokohama in Kanagawa Prefecture

Location	km	mi	Exit	Name	Destinations	Notes
Tsurumi-ku	0.0	0.0	—	Namamugi	Yokohane Route – Haneda, Yokohama-kōen; Daikoku Route – to Bayshore Route	Eastern terminus, the expressway continues south as the Daikoku Route
Tsurumi-ku	0.8	0.50	751/752	Kishiya-namamugi	National Route 1 – Tsurumi, Daikoku Wharf	Westbound exit, eastbound entrance
Tsurumi-ku	3.7	2.3	753/754	Baba		
Kōhoku-ku	7.0	4.3	755/756	Shin-Yokohama	Kanagawa Prefecture Route 13 (Yokohama-Ikuta Route) – Shin-Yokohama	
Tsuzuki-ku	8.2	5.1	757/758	Yokohama-Kōhoku	Daisan Keihin Road – Tokyo, Setagaya, Yokohama, Totsuka-ku, Yokohama; Yokohama Northwest Route – to Tōmei Expressway	Western terminus; expressway continues as the Yokohama Northwest Route
1.000 mi = 1.609 km; 1.000 km = 0.621 mi: Incomplete access; Route transition; Unopened
