= Yokohama Shindō =

Bypass of Yokohama

Yokohama Shindō
- 横浜新道

Route information
- Maintained by Ministry of Land, Infrastructure, Transport and Tourism (free section); East Nippon Expressway Company (tolled section)
- Length: 16.7 km (10.4 mi)
- Existed: 1948–present
- History: Completed in 1959
- Component highways: National Route 1 (bypass); Yokohama Shindō

Major junctions
- East end: National Route 1
- Mitsuzawa Route; Daisan Keihin Road; Yokohama–Yokosuka Road
- West end: National Route 1

Location
- Country: Japan

Highway system
- National highways of Japan; Expressways of Japan

The Yokohama Shindō (横浜新道) is a major highway located entirely in the city of Yokohama in the Greater Tokyo Area of Japan. It is signed as a bypass of National Route 1 as well as being partially designated as an expressway numbered E83. It is a bypass that travels from the southwestern corner of the city in Totsuka-ku northeast to Kanagawa-ku. It largely serves as a bypass to the west of central Yokohama.

== Route description ==
The Yokohama Shindō is a bypass that travels from the southwestern corner of the Yokohama in Totsuka-ku northeast through Hodogaya-ku to Kanagawa-ku. It largely serves as a bypass to the west of central Yokohama. The bypass begins at an intersection in Kanagawa-ku with the main line of National Route 1. From this eastern terminus, it travels southwest, then west through the ward. It crosses into Hodogaya-ku then turns to the southwest again. Just after entering the ward it has a junction with the Mitsuzawa Route and the Daisan Keihin Road. This junction is the beginning of the expressway section of the Yokohama Shindō. The expressway has another major junction with the Yokohama Yokosuka Road in Hodogaya-ku before crossing into Totsuka-ku. In Totsuka-ku, the expressway has a few more interchanges before transitioning back to a highway with signaled intersections. After this transition, the road eventually ends at an intersection with the main line of National Route 1.

== History ==
The route that would eventually become the free section of the Yokohama Shindō was established in 1948 during the Occupation of Japan as a bypass of the older Tōkaidō. After the occupation's end in 1952, management of the road was handed over to the Japan Highway Public Corporation and the road was designated as a bypass of National Route 1 on 4 December 1952. The tolled expressway section was established in 1957. Construction of the expressway took two years, with construction being completed and the expressway opening on 28 October 1959.

== Gallery ==
Yokohama Shindō

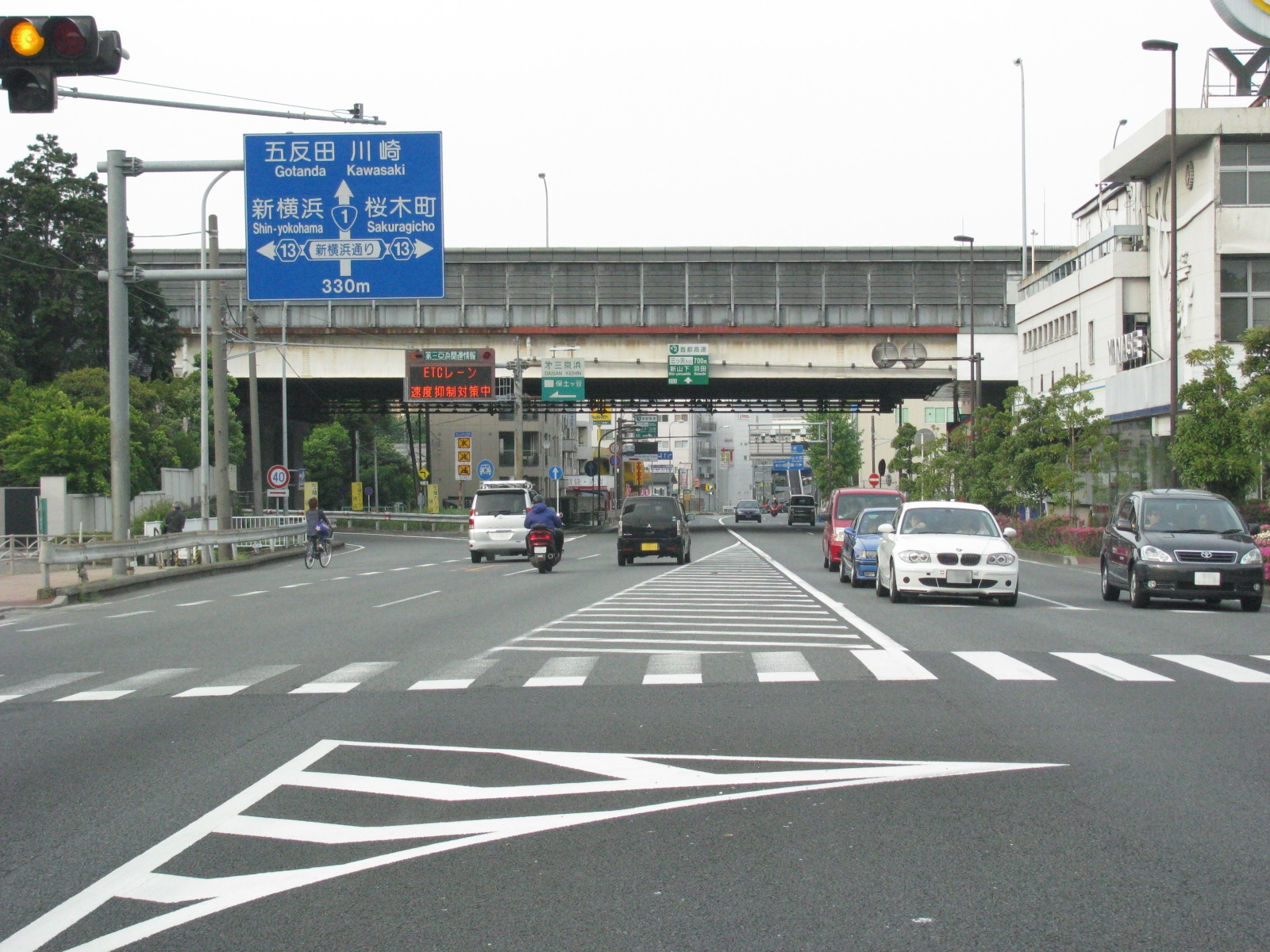
A junction along the at-grade section of the Yokohama Shindō

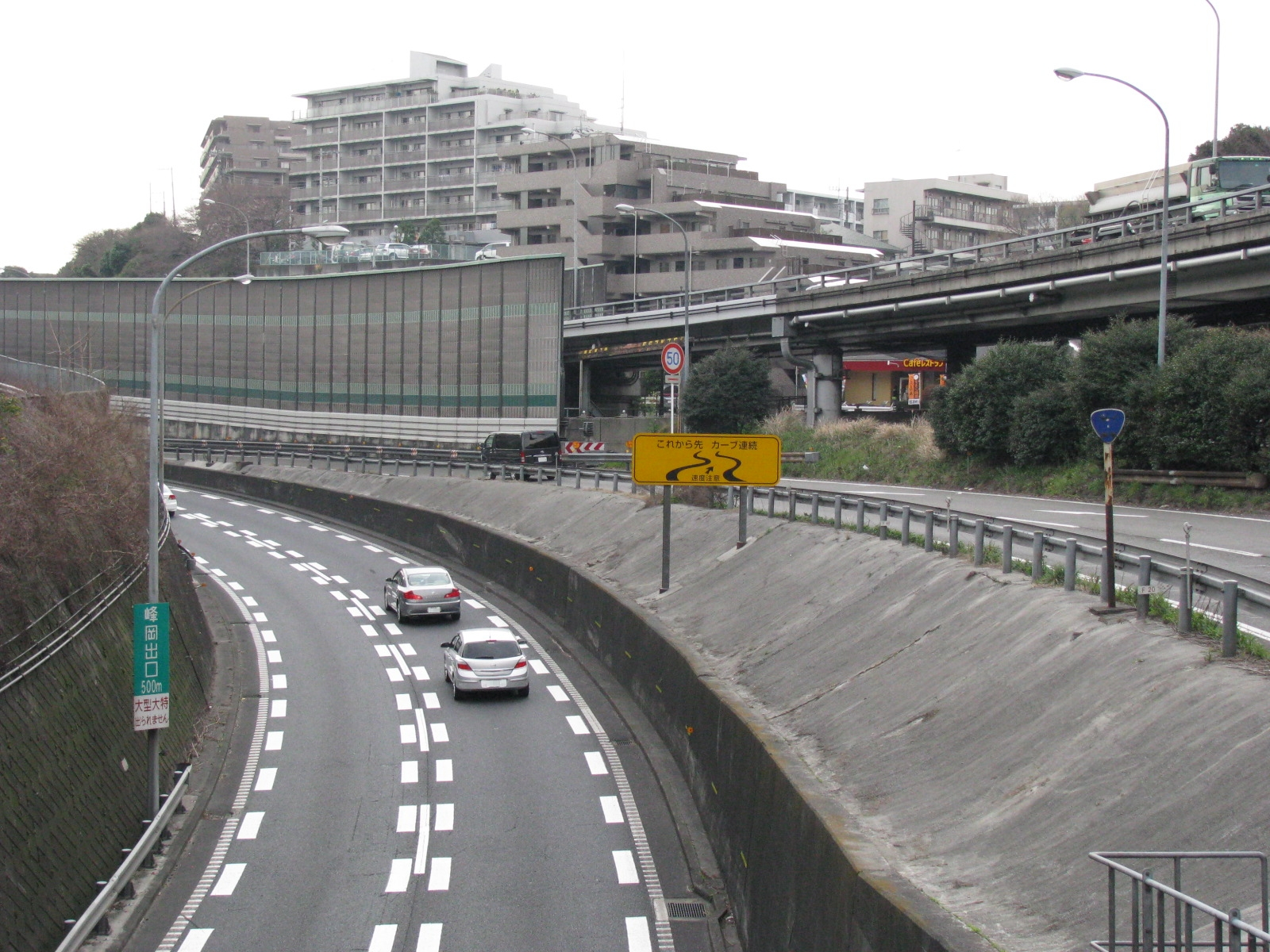
The eastern terminus of the expressway section of the Yokohama Shindō

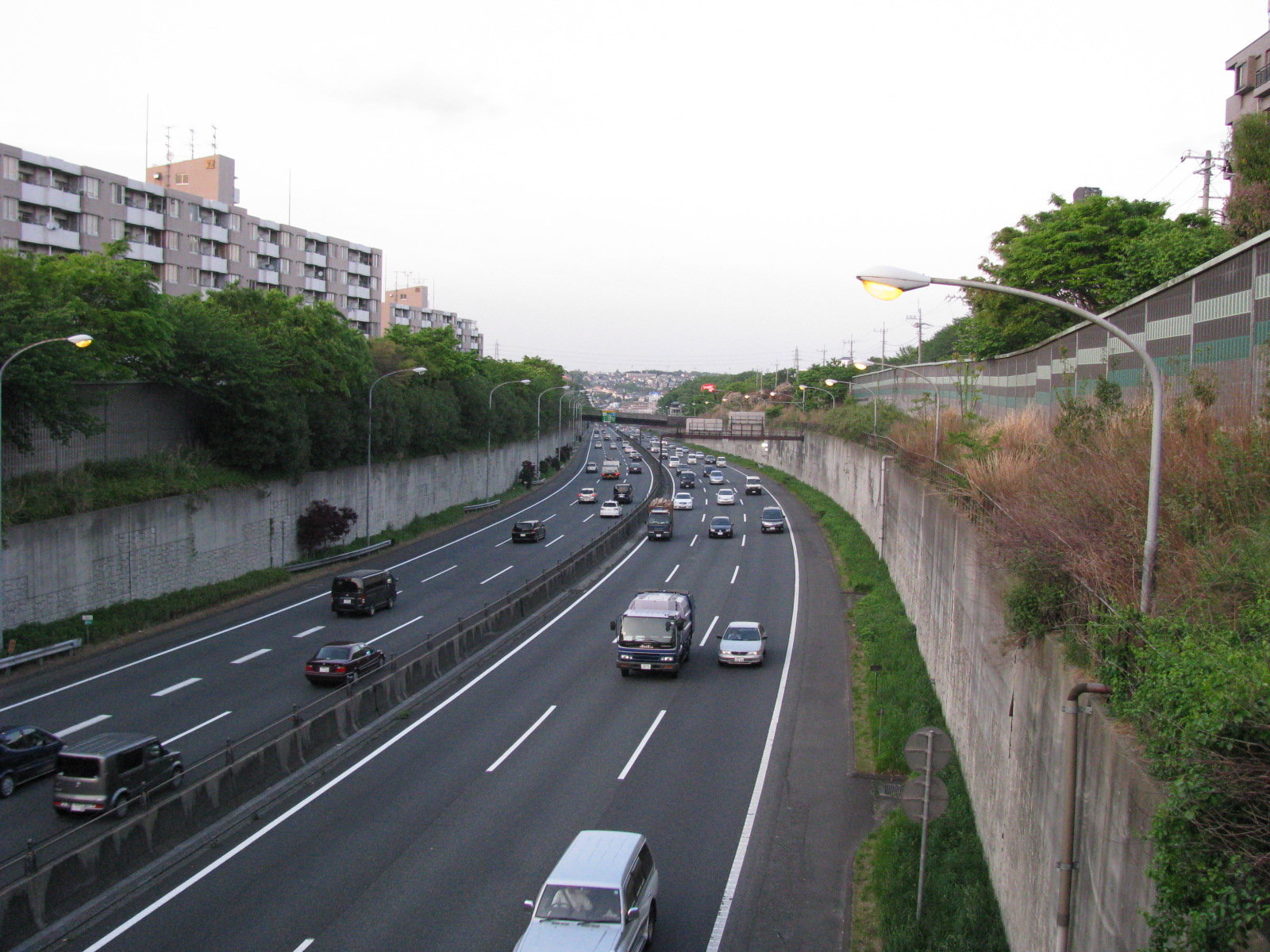
The expressway section of the route in Hodogaya-ku

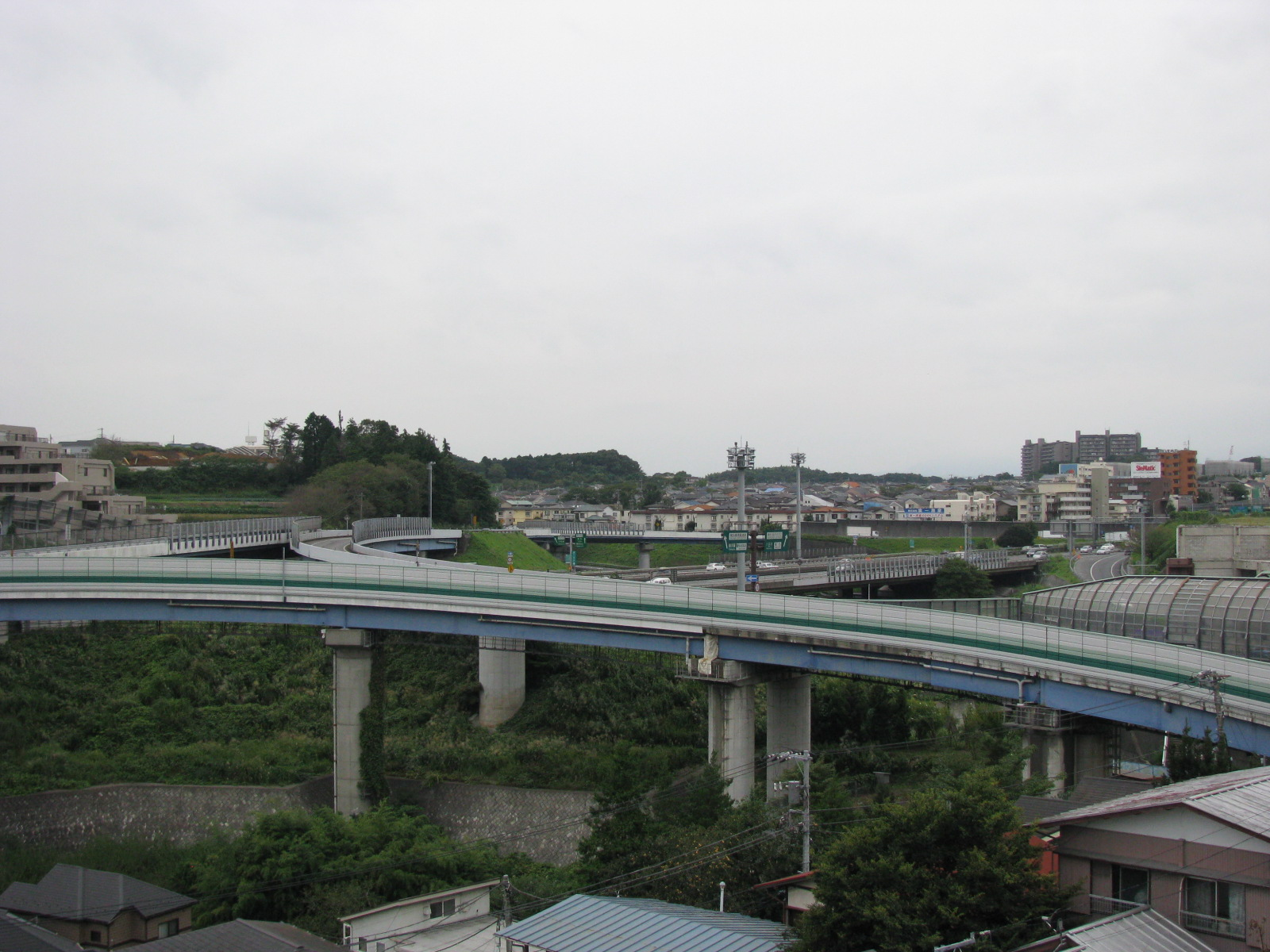
Shin-hodogaya Junction

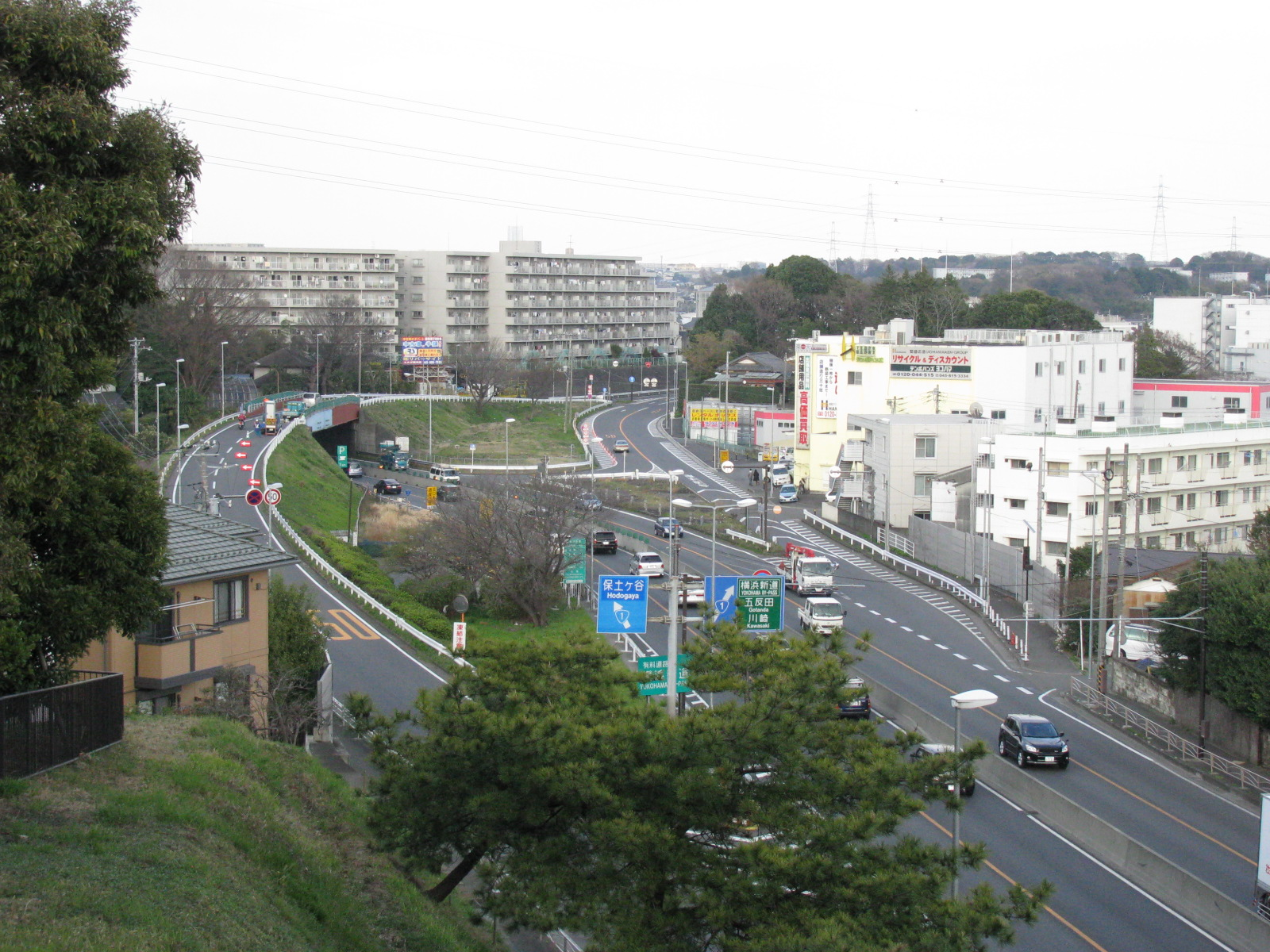
The western terminus of the expressway section

== Junction list ==
The entire expressway lies within Yokohama in Kanagawa Prefecture. Junctions are at-grade unless noted otherwise.

| Location | km | mi | Exit | Name | Destinations | Notes |
|---|---|---|---|---|---|---|
| Kanagawa-ku | 0.0 | 0.0 | — | — | National Route 1 – Tokyo, Gotanda, Kawasaki | Eastern terminus |
| Kanagawa-ku | 3.4 | 2.1 | — | — | Kanagawa Prefecture Route 13 – Shin-Yokohama, Sakauragichō | |
| Hodogaya-ku | 3.7– 4.5 | 2.3– 2.8 | 7 | Hodogaya | Daisan Keihin Road – to Mitsuzawa Route | Eastern end of limited access section. No westbound exit to Daihan Keihin Road |
| Hodogaya-ku | 4.7 | 2.9 | 8 | Tokiwadai | Unnamed street – to National Route 16, Mitsuzawa | Eastbound exit only |
| Hodogaya-ku | 5.0 | 3.1 | 9 | Mineoka | National Route 16 (Hachioji-kaidō) | Westbound exit only |
| Hodogaya-ku | 5.7 | 3.5 | 10 | Hoshikawa | Unnamed street | Westbound entrance only |
| Hodogaya-ku | 7.2 | 4.5 | — | Shin-hodogaya Toll Gate | | |
| Hodogaya-ku | 7.5 | 4.7 | 11 | Fujitsuka | Unnamed street | |
| Hodogaya-ku | 7.7 | 4.8 | 12 | Shin-hodogaya | Yokohama–Yokosuka Road – to Kariba Route, Yokosuka; National Route 16 (Hodogaya Bypass) – to Tōmei Expressway, Hachiōji | |
| Hodogaya-ku | 8.9 | 5.5 | 13 | Imai | Yokohama Kanjō 2 – Imai, Shin-Yokohama | |
| Totsuka-ku | 10.5 | 6.5 | 14 | Kawakami | Unnamed streets – Higashi-Totsuka Station, Kodomo Shizen Kōen, Nasechō | |
| Totsuka-ku | 12.1 | 7.5 | — | Totsuka Toll Gate | | |
| Totsuka-ku | 12.5 | 7.8 | 15 | Kamiyabe | Kanagawa Prefecture Route 401 – Higashi-Totsuka Station, Kodomo Shizen Kōen, Nasechō | Eastbound entrance and exit, westbound entrance |
| Totsuka-ku | 13.3 | 8.3 | — | — | National Route 1 – Hodogaya, Odawara | At-grade junction; Western end of limited-access section |
| Totsuka-ku | 14.9 | 9.3 | — | — | Kanagawa Prefecture Route 22 – Totsuka Station, Chōgo | Interchange |
| Totsuka-ku | 16.7 | 10.4 | — | — | National Route 1 – Shizuoka, Odawara, Fujisawa | Western terminus |
1.000 mi = 1.609 km; 1.000 km = 0.621 mi: Incomplete access
