= Hodogaya-ku =

Hodogaya 保土ケ谷区
- Ward
- Hodogaya Ward
- Logo of Hodogaya-ku

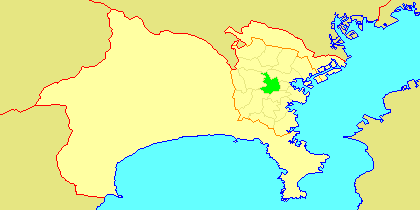

- Location in Japan Hodogaya (Japan)
- Coordinates: 35°27′36″N 139°35′46″E
- Country: Japan
- Region: Kantō
- Prefecture: Kanagawa

Area
  - Total: 21.81 km^{2} (8.42 sq mi)

Population (February 2010)
  - Total: 205,887
  - Density: 9,400/km^{2} (24,000/sq mi)
- Time zone: UTC+09:00 (JST)
- City hall address: 2-9 Kawabe-chō, Hodogaya-ku Yokohama-shi, Kanagawa-ken; 240-0001
- Website: www.city.yokohama.lg.jp/hodogaya/
- Symbols
- Bird: Indian spot-billed duck
- Flower: Viola
- Tree: Castanopsis, flowering peach

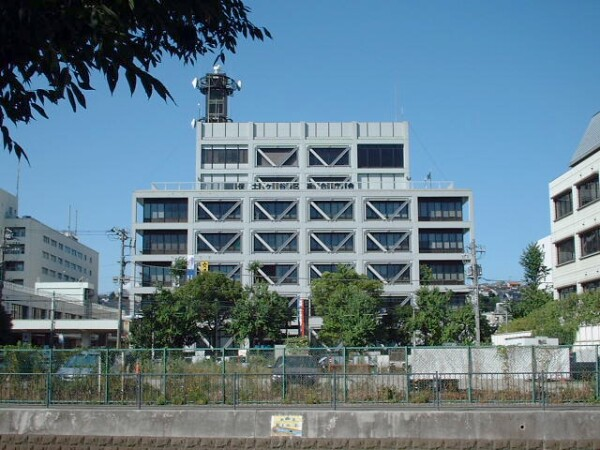
Hodogaya Ward Office

Hodogaya-ku (保土ケ谷区) is one of the 18 wards of the city of Yokohama in Kanagawa Prefecture, Japan. As of 2010, Hodogaya Ward had an estimated population of 205,887 and a density of 9,400 inhabitants per square kilometer (24,000/sq mi). The total area was 21.91 km^{2} (8.46 sq mi).

== Geography ==
Hodogaya Ward is located in eastern Kanagawa Prefecture, and near the geographic center of the city of Yokohama. The area is largely flatland, with scattered small hills.

=== Surrounding municipalities ===
- Kanagawa Ward
- Nishi Ward
- Minami Ward
- Asahi Ward
- Totsuka Ward
- Midori Ward

== History ==
The area around present-day Hodogaya has been inhabited for thousands of years. Archaeologists have found stone tools from the Japanese Paleolithic period and ceramic shards from the Jōmon period at numerous locations in the area. Under the Nara period Ritsuryō system, it became part of Tachibana District and Tsutsuki District in Musashi Province. By the Heian period it was part of a huge shōen controlled by Ise Shrine and administered by the Hangaya clan, a subsidiary of the Hatakeyama clan. By the Kamakura period, the Hatakeyama clan ruled as local warlords until their territories were seized by the Later Hōjō clan from Odawara in the late Muromachi period. After the defeat of the Hōjō at the Battle of Odawara, the territory came under the control of Tokugawa Ieyasu. It was administered as tenryō territory controlled directly by the Tokugawa shogunate, but administered through various hatamoto. The area prospered in the Edo period as Hodogaya-juku, a post station on the Tōkaidō connecting Edo with Kyoto.

After the Meiji Restoration, the area was transferred to the new Kanagawa Prefecture, and Hodogaya Town was established on April 1, 1889, two years after the completion of Hodogaya Station on the Tōkaidō Main Line railway connecting Tokyo with Osaka. Hodogaya suffered severe damage from the 1923 Great Kantō earthquake. On October 1, 1927, it was annexed by the neighboring city of Yokohama, becoming Hodogaya Ward. The area suffered greatly again during the Yokohama air raid of May 29, 1945.

In a major administrative reorganization of October 1, 1969, Hodogaya gave up a large area the new Asahi Ward, and gained a portion of the territory of Kōhoku Ward.

== Economy ==
Hodogaya Ward is largely a regional commercial center and bedroom community for central Yokohama and Tokyo. Formerly a number of chemical, glass and electronics companies maintained factories in Hodogaya, but with the exception of the head offices of Furakawa Battery Company Ltd., all have relocated to less densely populated areas. There is some residual agriculture in Hodogaya Ward, primarily potatoes and cabbage.

== Transportation ==
=== Railroads ===
- JR East - Yokosuka Line/Shōnan-Shinjuku Line
  - Hodogaya
- Sotetsu Main Line
  - Tennōchō - Hoshikawa - Wadamachi - Kamihoshikawa - Nishiya
- The Tōkaidō Shinkansen and Tōkaidō Main Line pass through Hodogaya, but without any stations.

=== Bus services ===
- Yokohama City Transportation Bureau Municipal Bus
- Sagami Railway Bus
- Kanagawa Chuo Kotsu

=== Highways ===
==== Expressways ====
- Shuto Expressway Kanagawa No. 2 Mitsuzawa Line
  - - Hodogaya IC
- Shuto Expressway Kanagawa No. 3 Kariba Line
  - Kariba IC -
- Yokohama Shindō (a bypass of Route 1)
  - Hodogaya IC - Tokiwadai IC - Mineoka IC - Hoshikawa IC - Fujitsuka IC - Shin-Hodogaya IC - Imai IC -
- Hodogaya Bypass (a bypass of Route 16)
  - - Shin-Sakuragaoka IC - Shin-Hodogaya IC
- Yokohama Yokosuka Road

==== National Highways ====
- Route 1
- Route 16
- Route 466 (Daisan Keihin Road)

==== Prefecture roads ====
- Kanagawa Prefecture Road 21 Yokohama-Kamakura Line
- Kanagawa Prefecture Road 109 Aoto-Kamihoshikawa Line
- Kanagawa Prefecture Road 201 Hodogaya Stop Line

==== City roads ====
- Yokohama Loop Line 2

== Education ==
University:

- Yokohama National University

Kanagawa Prefectural Board of Education operates prefectural high schools. Prefectural senior high schools:

- Hodogaya High School
- Kōryō High School
- Shōkō High School

Municipal high schools of the Yokohama Municipal Board of Education: Sakuragaoka High School

Private high schools:

- Yokohama Seifū High School

The board of education operates public elementary and junior high schools.

Junior high schools:

- Arai (新井)
- Hodogaya (保土ケ谷)
- Iwaihara (岩井原)
- Iwasaki (岩崎)
- Kamisugeta (上菅田)
- Miyata (宮田)
- Nishiya (西谷)
- Tachibana (橘)

Additionally Karuisawa Junior High School (軽井沢中学校), which has its campus outside of Hodogaya-ku, has a zone that includes portions of Hodogaya-ku.

Elementary schools:

- Arai (新井)
- Bukkō (仏向)
- Fujimidai (富士見台)
- Fujizuka (藤塚)
- Gontazaka (権太坂)
- Hatsunegaoka (初音が丘)
- Hodogaya (保土ケ谷)
- Hoshikawa (星川)
- Imai (今井)
- Iwasaki (岩崎)
- Kamihoshikawa (上星川)
- Kamisugeta Sasa no Oka (上菅田笹の丘)
- Katabira (帷子)
- Kawashima (川島)
- Mine (峯)
- Sakamoto (坂本)
- Sakuradai (桜台)
- Setogaya (瀬戸ケ谷)
- Tokiwadai (常盤台)

Former:

- Sasayama

Additionally, the zones of Higashi Shinano Elementary (東品濃小学校), Mitsuzawa Elementary (三ツ沢小学校), Miyagaya Elementary (宮谷小学校), and Sakaigi Elementary (境木小学校), schools not in Hodogaya-ku, include portions of Hodogaya-ku.

== Noted people from Hodogaya Ward ==
- Setsuko Hara, actress
- Kanako Mitsuhashi, voice actress
- Risa Niigaki, singer
- Akira Terao, actor
- Hiroshi Yamamoto, Olympic medal archer
- Masahiro Matsuoka, idol

== Song of Ward ==
- "Waga Machi Hodogaya" (Our Town, Hodogaya): Lyrics by Monami Kaihara, Music by Masaoki Okajima
