= Daikoku Route =

Road in Kanagawa Prefecture, Japan

Shuto Expressway Daikoku Route 首都高速神奈川5号大黒線
- Daikoku Route highlighted in red

Route information
- Maintained by Metropolitan Expressway Company Limited
- Length: 3.6 km (2.2 mi)
- Existed: 1989–present

Major junctions
- East end: Tsurumi-ku, Yokohama
- West end: Tsurumi-ku, Yokohama

Location
- Country: Japan

Highway system
- National highways of Japan; Expressways of Japan

The Daikoku Route (大黒線, Daikoku-sen), signed as Route K5, is one of the tolled routes of the Shuto Expressway system serving the Greater Tokyo Area and is one of seven of the routes in the system serving Kanagawa Prefecture.

== Junction list ==
The entire expressway lies within Yokohama in Kanagawa Prefecture

Location	km	mi	Exit	Name	Destinations	Notes
Tsurumi-ku	0.0	0.0	—	Daikoku	Bayshore Route – to Tokyo Bay Aqua-Line	Southern terminus; parking area
Tsurumi-ku	0.0	0.0	551	Daikokufutō	Daikoku-Ōhashi-dōri – Daikoku Pier Area, Namamugi	
Tsurumi-ku	3.6	2.2	—	Namamugi	Yokohane Route – Haneda, Yokohama-kōen; Yokohama North Route – to Tōmei Expressway	Northern terminus; expressway continues west as the Yokohama North Route
1.000 mi = 1.609 km; 1.000 km = 0.621 mi: Route transition
