= Japan National Route 466 =

Road in Japan

Coordinates: 35.60025°N 139.633285°E

National Route 466
- 国道466号

Route information
- Length: 18.4 km (11.4 mi)
- Existed: 6 May 1993–present

Major junctions
- North end: National Route 246 at Setagaya
- South end: Mitsuzawa Route at Hodogaya-ku, Yokohama

Location
- Country: Japan

Highway system
- National highways of Japan; Expressways of Japan
← National Route 465	→ National Route 467

National Route 466 (国道466号, Kokudō Yonhyaku roku-jurokugō) is a national highway in Japan connecting Setagaya and Hodogaya-ku, Yokohama, with a total length of 18.4 kilometers (11.4 mi).

== List of interchanges and features ==
Name	Connections	Dist. from origin (km)	Notes	Location	
Seta Intersection	National Route 246	0.0	From here to Tamagawa Interchange is commonly known (and signed) as Kanpachi-Dori	Setagaya	Tokyo
Tamagawa Interchange	Met. Route 311 (Kanjō Hachigō Route)	1.8	Northern terminus of the Daisan Keihin Road	Setagaya	Tokyo
Keihin-Kawasaki		4.0			Kanagawa
Tsuzuki		9.5			Kanagawa
Kohoku	Yokohama North Route	12.5		Tsuzuki-ku, Shin Yokohama	Kanagawa
Hodogaya	Mitsuzawa Route; Yokohama Shindō	17.0			Kanagawa
Through to Mitsuzawa Route, Yokohama Shindō, Yokohama Yokosuka Road, Hodogaya Bypass

== Daisan Keihin Road ==
Daisan Keihin Road
- 第三京浜道路 (Daisan Keihin Dōro)
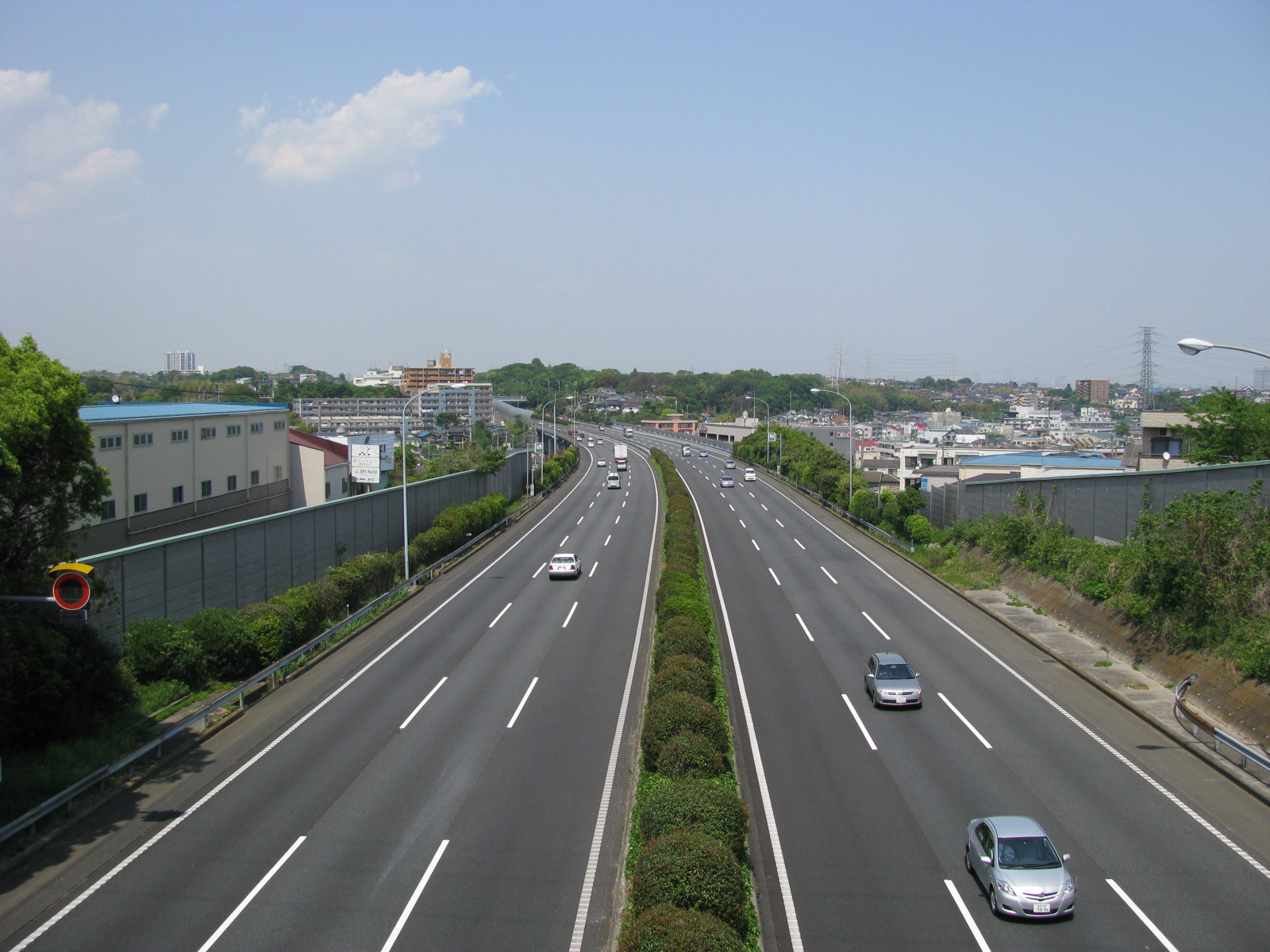

Route information
- Maintained by East Nippon Expressway Company
- Length: 16.6 km (10.3 mi)
- Existed: 1964–present
- Component highways: National Route 466

Major junctions
- North end: Setagaya; National Route 466 / Tokyo Metropolitan Route 311
- South end: Kanagawa-ku, Yokohama; Yokohama Shindo / National Route 466

Location
- Country: Japan

Highway system
- National highways of Japan; Expressways of Japan

A major part of the National Route 466 is known as the Daisan Keihin Road (第三京浜道路, Daisan Keihin Dōro), a limited access toll road connecting Tokyo and Yokohama. It is managed by the East Nippon Expressway Company. In addition to its designation as National Route 466, the Daisan Keihin Road is signed as a part of E83 under the "2016 Proposal for Realization of Expressway Numbering".

=== Route description ===
The toll road has three lanes traveling in each direction along the entire 16.6-kilometer (10.3 mi) route. The speed limit is set at 80 km/h along most of the toll road, the only exceptions to this limit is at the termini of the route where the limit is set at 60 km/h.

==== Tolls ====
In short, the tolls average at a cost of 50 to 100 yen per exit. To drive the entire route costs ¥390 for standard-sized cars.
