= Kawasaki Route =

Route of the Shuto Expressway in Kanagawa, Japan

Shuto Expressway Kawasaki Route 首都高速神奈川6号川崎線
- The Kawasaki Route highlighted in red

Route information
- Maintained by Metropolitan Expressway Company Limited
- Length: 5.5 km (3.4 mi)
- Existed: 2002–present

Major junctions
- East end: Tokyo Bay Aqua-Line / Bayshore Route
- West end: Yokohane Route / National Route 409

Location
- Country: Japan

Highway system
- National highways of Japan; Expressways of Japan

The Kawasaki Route (川崎線, Kawasaki-sen), signed as Route K6, is one of the tolled routes of the Shuto Expressway system serving the Greater Tokyo Area and is one of seven of the routes in the system serving Kanagawa Prefecture.

== Route description ==
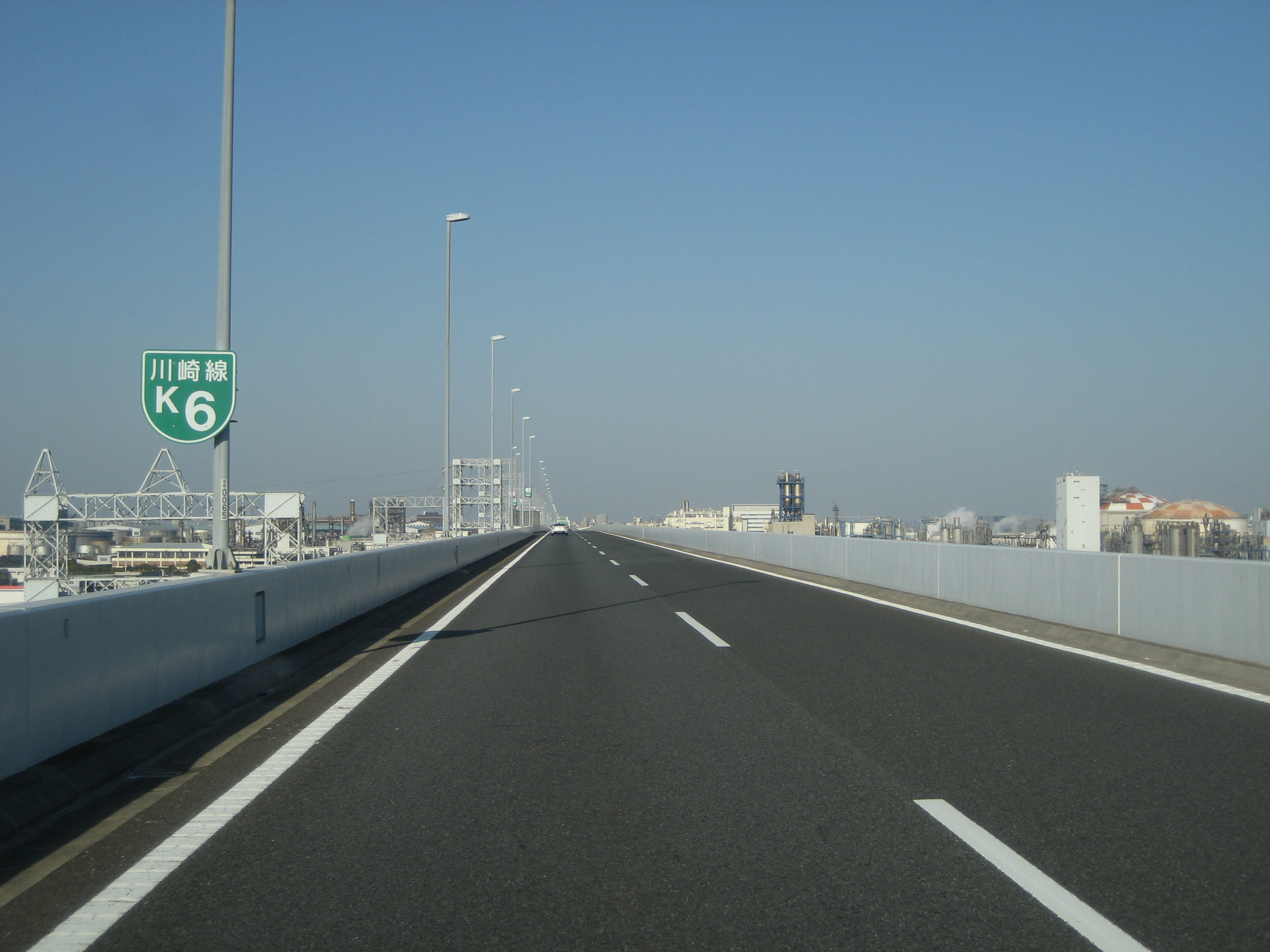
The Kawasaki Route heading west near its eastern terminus

The Kawasaki Route begins at the Kawasaki-Ukishima Junction as a continuation west for the Tokyo Bay Aqua-Line into Kanagawa Prefecture. The division between the two expressways is the Bayshore Route, which travels along the edge of Tokyo Bay. From this eastern terminus, the Kawasaki Route travels west through Kawasaki, paralleling National Route 409. The only interchange along the Kawasaki Route aside from its termini is at Tonomachi Junction where the two parallel routes partially connect. The expressway meets its western terminus at Daishi Junction with the Yokohane Route.

The speed limit along almost the entire length of the Kawasaki Route is set at 80 km/h. The only exceptions to this is at the termini of the route where the limit is lowered to 40 km/h. The Kawasaki Route is a part of the partially-complete Kawasaki Connector, an expressway planned to link the Tokyo Bay Aqua-Line and National Route 15. The Ministry of Land, Infrastructure, Transport and Tourism plans to include the connector in an outer ring road around the Greater Tokyo Area.

== History ==
The Kawasaki Route was first opened on 30 April 2002, with the completion of construction between the interchange at Tonomachi and Kawasaki-Ukishima Junction. On 20 October 2010, the expressway was extended west to its present terminus at Daishi Junction where it meets the Yokohane Route, though it was originally planned to be opened on 18 October. The total cost of the 2-kilometer-long (1.2 mi) extension, including a 700-meter (2,300 ft) tunnel, was ¥2.9 trillion (US$26.42 billion).

== Junction list ==
The entire expressway lies within Kawasaki in Kanagawa Prefecture.

Location	km	mi	Exit	Name	Destinations	Notes
Kawasaki	0.0	0.0	—	Kawasaki-Ukishima	Bayshore Route – Haneda, Yokohama, Tokyo; Tokyo Bay Aqua-Line – Kisarazu	Eastern terminus; expressway continues east as the Tokyo Bay Aqua-Line
Kawasaki	3.5	2.2	681	Tonomachi	National Route 409 (Ukishima-dōri)	Eastbound entrance, westbound exit
Kawasaki	5.5	3.4	683	Daishi	Yokohane Route – Yokohama-kōen; National Route 409 (Daishi-michi) – Kawasaki Station	Current western terminus, Yokohane Route access only to southbound and from northbound traffic
Planned extension of the expressway to National Route 15
1.000 mi = 1.609 km; 1.000 km = 0.621 mi: Incomplete access; Route transition; Unopened
