= Daikoku Pier =

Daikoku Pier 大黒埠頭
- District
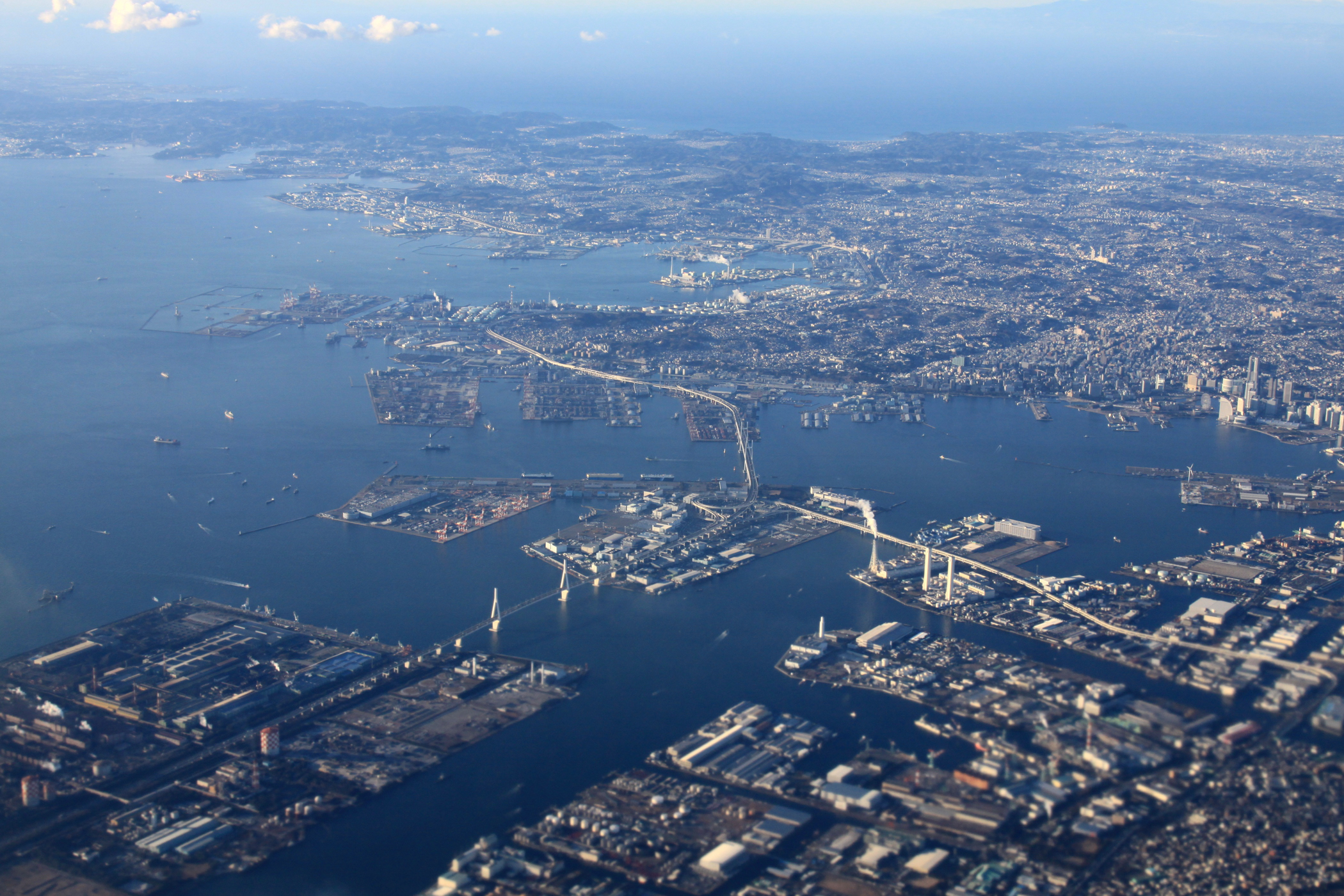
- View of Daikoku Pier (center)

- Location within Yokohama Location within Kanagawa Prefecture
- Coordinates: 35°27′59.43″N 139°40′57.13″E
- Country: Japan
- Prefecture: Kanagawa Prefecture
- Municipality: Yokohama
- Ward: Tsurumi-ku

Area
  - Total: 3.122 km^{2} (1.205 sq mi)

Population (December 31, 2017)
  - Total: 0
  - Density: 0.0/km^{2} (0.0/sq mi)
- Time zone: UTC+9 (Japan Standard Time)
- Postal code: 230-0054
- Area code: 045
- Vehicle registration: 横浜 (Yokohama)

Daikoku Pier (大黒埠頭, Daikokufutō) is an area of Tsurumi-ku, Yokohama, Kanagawa Prefecture. Originally constructed as a freight base, it now serves as a transportation hub for traffic around Port of Yokohama. It provides access to the Shuto Expressway and serves as a docking point for large cruise ships. Due to its role as a hub for diverse economic activities, significant bridges such as the Daikoku Ohashi Bridge and Yokohama Bay Bridge have been constructed.
