= Shuto Expressway =

Network of toll expressways in the Greater Tokyo area

Coordinates: 35.660814°N 139.737560°E

Metropolitan Expressway Company Limited
- Native name: 首都高速道路株式会社
- Romanized name: Shuto Kōsoku-dōro Kabushiki-gaisha
- Type: Kabushiki gaisha
- Industry: Transportation
- Predecessor: Metropolitan Expressway Public Corporation (1959–2005)
- Founded: 1959 (as public corporation); 2005 (corporatized)
- Headquarters: Tokyo, Japan
- Area served: Tokyo, Kanagawa Prefecture, Chiba, Saitama
- Key people: Toshitaka Miyata (CEO)
- Products: Operation and maintenance of the Shuto Expressway
- Revenue: ▲¥444.91 billion (2008)
- Owners: Government of Japan (49.99%); Tokyo Metropolitan Government (26.72%); Kanagawa Prefecture (8.28%); Saitama Prefecture (5.90%); Yokohama Municipal Government (4.45%); Kawasaki City (3.82%); Chiba Prefecture (0.80%)
- Number of employees: 2609 (2008)
- Subsidiaries: Metropolitan Expressway Service Co, Ltd.
- Website: www.shutoko.jp

Shuto Expressway system in 2015 shown in red, other interconnected expressways in green

The Shuto Expressway (首都高速道路, Shuto Kōsoku-dōro; "Metropolitan Expressway", lit. "Capital Expressway") is a network of tolled expressways in the Greater Tokyo Area of Japan. It is operated and maintained by the Metropolitan Expressway Company Limited (首都高速道路株式会社, Shuto Kōsoku-dōro Kabushiki-gaisha).

Most routes are grade separated and have many sharp curves and multi-lane merges that require caution to drive safely. The speed limit is 60 km/h on most routes, 80 km/h on the Bayshore Route, and 50 km/h on the Inner Circular Route.

As of 2014, the cash toll for a standard-size car is ¥1300 regardless of distance traveled. Vehicles using the ETC toll-collection system pay a distance-based toll ranging from ¥300 to ¥1300 for ordinary vehicles – in some cases substantially less than the previous fixed-rate toll. Lower cash rates exist for certain radial routes (where there are only a few kilometers of expressway remaining) and ETC users have various time-of-day discounts. For large vehicles, the toll is doubled.

== Routes ==
There are 24 routes currently in operation:

=== Circumferential routes ===
- C1 Inner Circular Route
- C2 Central Circular Route — loop incorporating the Yamate Tunnel.
- Y Yaesu Route — via Tokyo Expressway
- B Bayshore Route (Higashi-Kanto-Expressway – ) Chidori-cho – Sachiura / Namiki ( – Yokohama–Yokosuka Expressway)

=== Radial routes ===
- No. 1 Ueno Route Edobashi JCT – Iriya
- No. 1 Haneda Route Hamazakibashi JCT – Haneda ( – Route K1)
- No. 2 Meguro Route Ichinohashi JCT – Togoshi
- No. 3 Shibuya Route Tanimachi JCT – Yoga ( – the Tomei Expressway)
- No. 4 Shinjuku Route Miyakezaka JCT – Takaido ( – the Chuo Expressway)
- No. 5 Ikebukuro Route Takebashi JCT – Bijogi JCT ( – Route S5)
- No. 6 Mukojima Route Edobashi JCT – Horikiri JCT ( – Route C2)
- No. 6 Misato Route Kosuge JCT – Misato JCT ( – Tokyo Gaikan Expressway)
- No. 7 Komatsugawa Route Ryogoku JCT – Ichinoe ( – Keiyo Road)
- No. 9 Fukagawa Route Hakozaki JCT – Tatsumi JCT ( – Bayshore Route)
- No. 10 Harumi Route Ariake JCT – Harumi
- No. 11 Daiba Route Shibaura JCT – Ariake JCT (Tokyo Rainbow Bridge)

=== Kanagawa routes ===
- K1 Yokohane Route (Route 1 – ) Haneda - Ishikawa-cho JCT ( – Route K3)
- K2 Mitsuzawa Route Kinko JCT – Mitsuzawa ( – Yokohama Shindo Road and Daisan Keihin Road)
- K3 Kariba Route Honmoku JCT – Kariba ( – Yokohama Shindo Road and Yokohama-Yokosuka Expressway)
- K5 Daikoku Route (Route K1 – ) Namamugi JCT - Daikoku JCT ( – Bayshore Route)
- K6 Kawasaki Route Tonomachi – Kawasaki-Ukishima JCT ( – Bayshore Route and Tokyo Bay Aqua Line)
- K7 Yokohama North Route (Route K1 and Route K5 – ) Namamugi JCT - Yokohama Kōhoku JCT ( – Daisan Keihin Road and Route K7)
- K7 Yokohama Northwest Route (Route K7 and Daisan Keihin Road – ) Yokohama Kōhoku JCT – Yokohama-Aoba JCT ( – Tōmei Expressway)

=== Saitama routes ===
- S1 Kawaguchi Route (Route C2 – ) Kohoku JCT – Kawaguchi JCT ( – Tokyo Gaikan Expressway)
- S2 Saitama Shintoshin Route (Route S5) Yono – Saitama-Minuma
- S5 Ōmiya Route (Route 5 – ) Bijogi JCT – Yono ( – Route S2)

== History ==
The Metropolitan Expressway was first built between Kyobashi Exit in Chūō, Tokyo and Shibaura Exit in Minato, Tokyo in 1962 for the purpose of increasing traffic flow efficiency in the Tokyo Metropolitan Area, thus optimizing and improving the functionality of the traffic system. Since then, 280 kilometers of highway network has been built in the Tokyo metropolitan area; 30 kilometers more of highway are either constructed or planned, making the Metropolitan Expressway a vast network of urban expressways in the Tokyo region.

Like other expressways in Japan including the Tōmei Expressway, the Shuto line has become a common street racing road. One of the lines, the Bayshore Route (also known as the Wangan route), received worldwide notoriety during the 1990s as the home course for the Mid Night Club, one of the most notorious street racing clubs, who were known for their 300 km/h, sometimes 320 km/h exploits. These exploits and street racing culture on the Shuto Expressway have made it a well-known location for street racing and speed records.

Due to this infamy, the Wangan is the setting for several entertainment franchises, such as the manga and arcade game Wangan Midnight, video games Shutokou Battle and Gran Turismo 5, 6, Sport and 7 (as the street circuit) and the movie series Shuto Kousoku Trial. Numerous car enthusiast magazines and DVDs, like Best Motoring, also highlight races and activities on the Wangan.

Inner Tokyo sections of the expressway prohibit motorcycle pillion passengers due to poor road geometry. The C2 route allows motorcycles with pillion passengers to travel through. The ban does not apply to motorcycles equipped with a sidecar. The segments with a pillion ban include the important C1 Inner Circular route and adjoining central Tokyo routes.

There are 21 parking areas scattered throughout the Shuto Expressway system. In general these are much smaller than the service areas available every 30 kilometers (19 miles) or so on inter-city expressways.

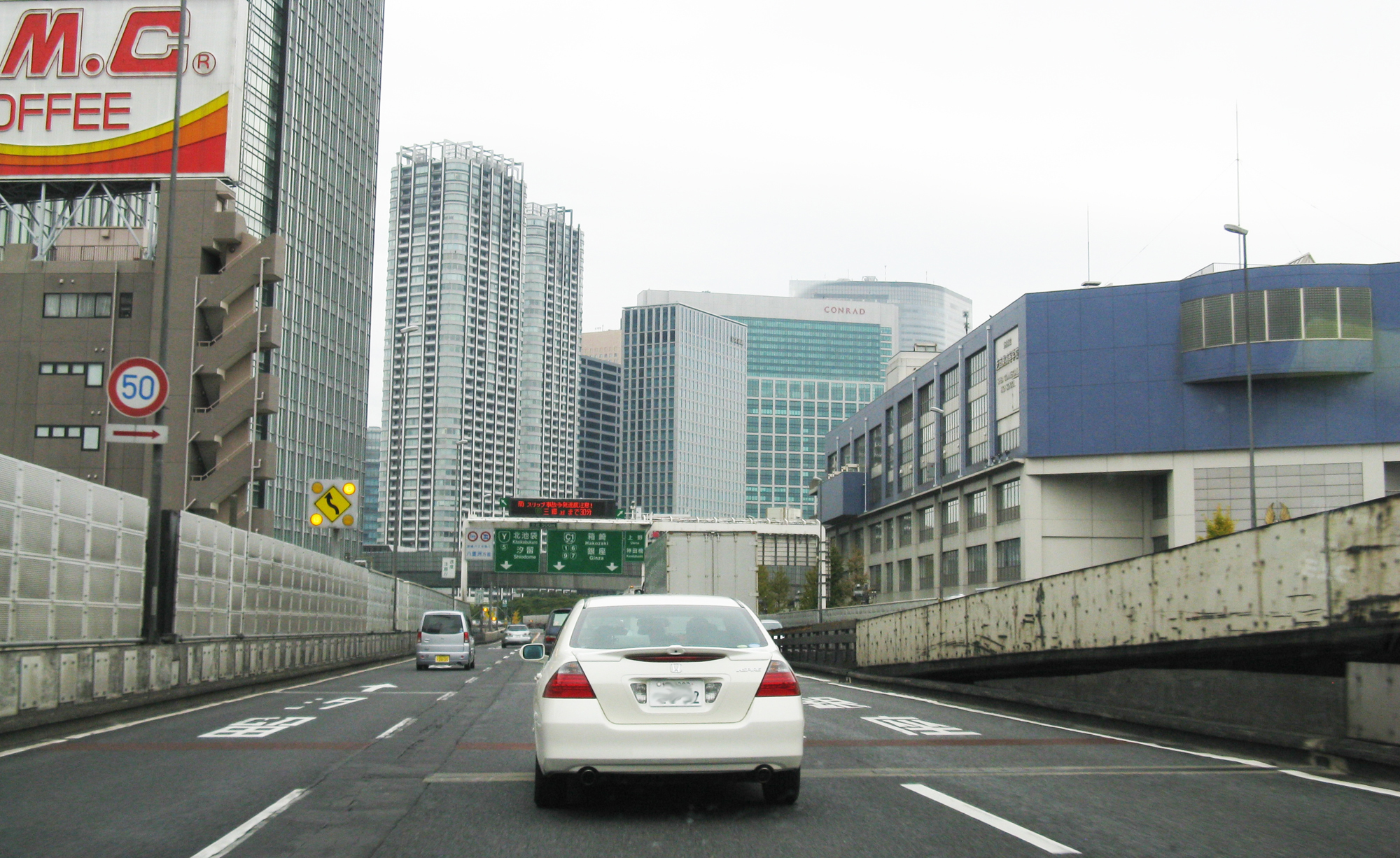
Near Shiodome, C1 Inner Circular Route

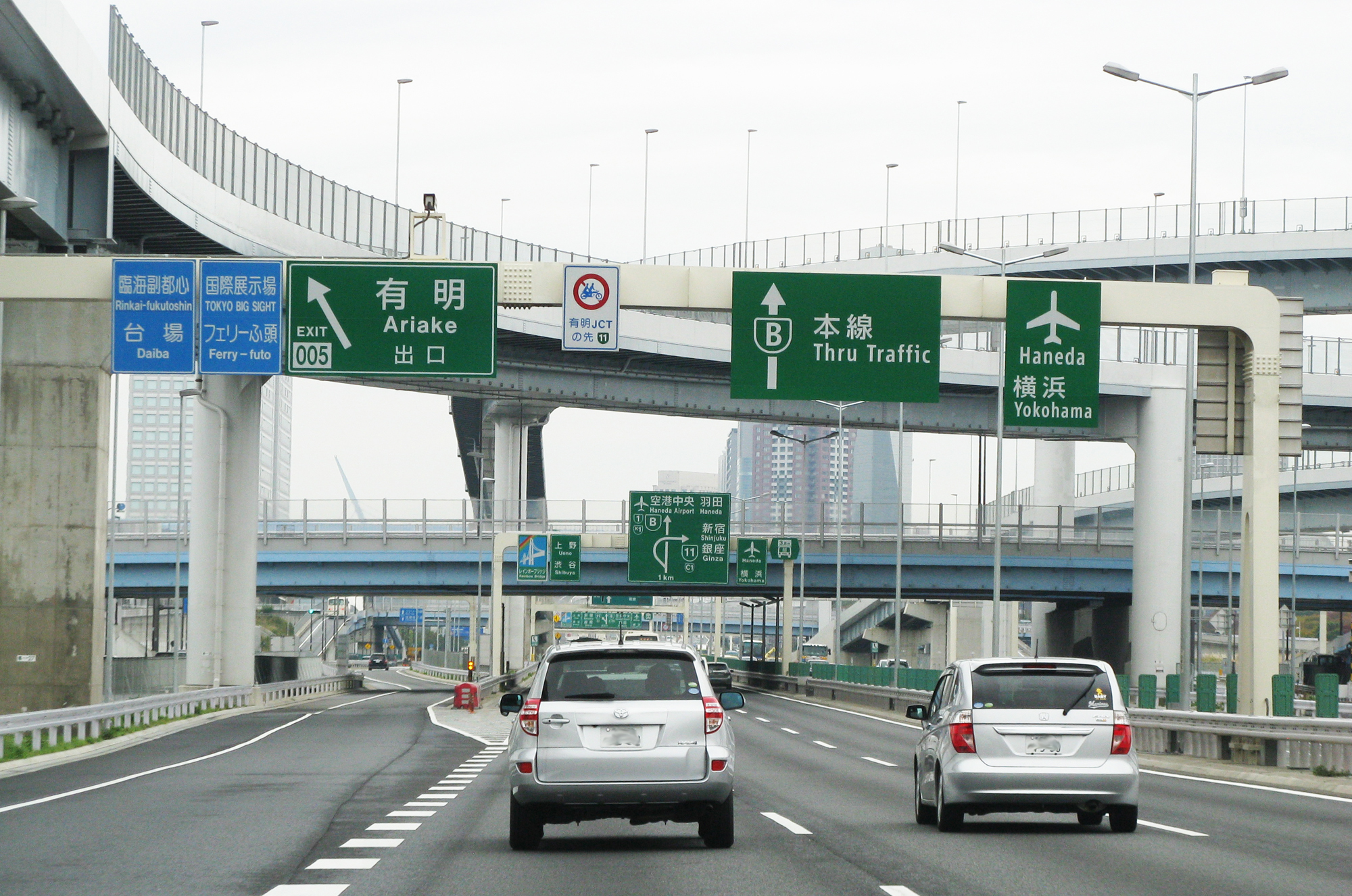
Shinonome Junction

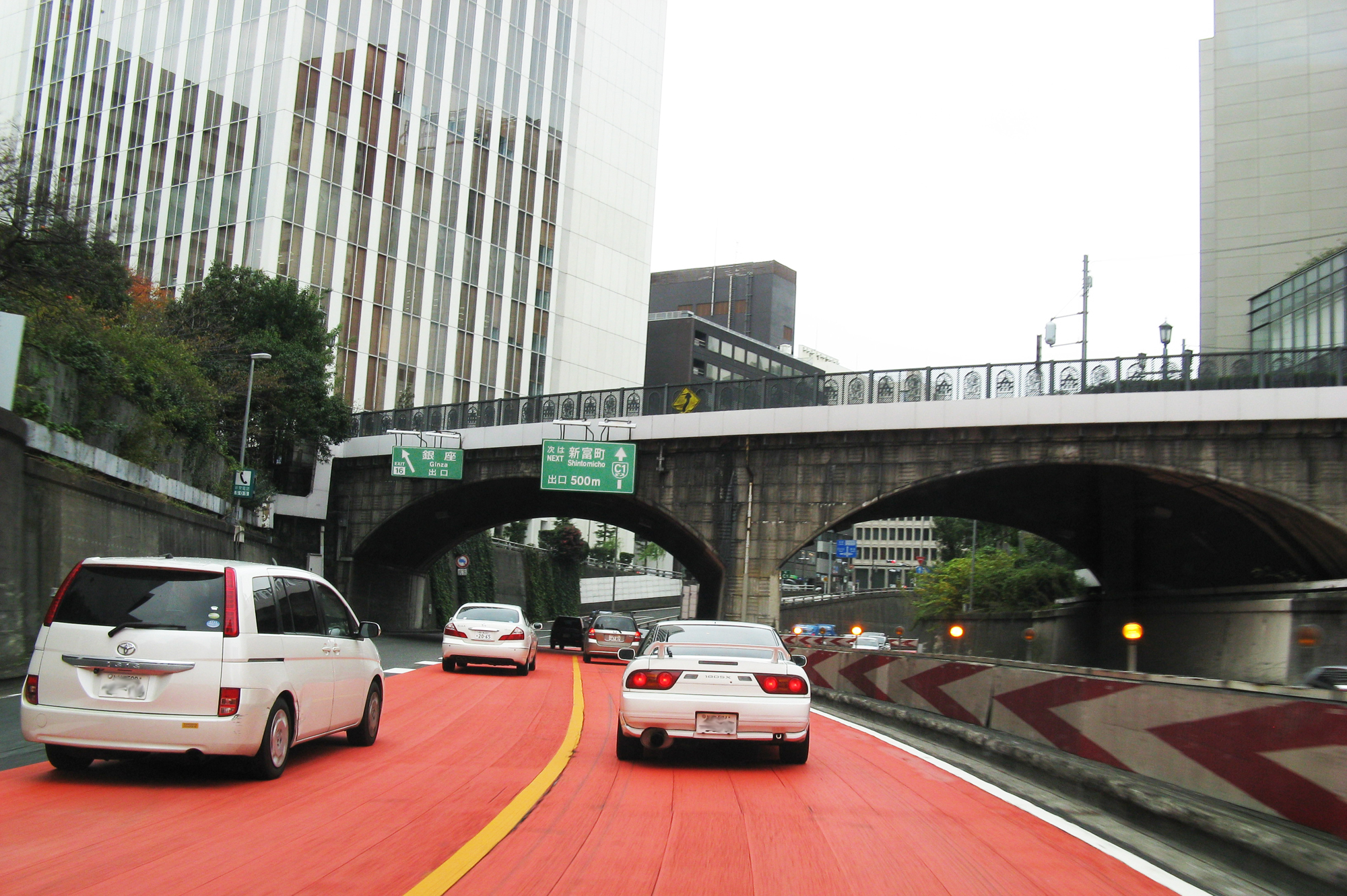
Ginza, C1 Inner Circular Route

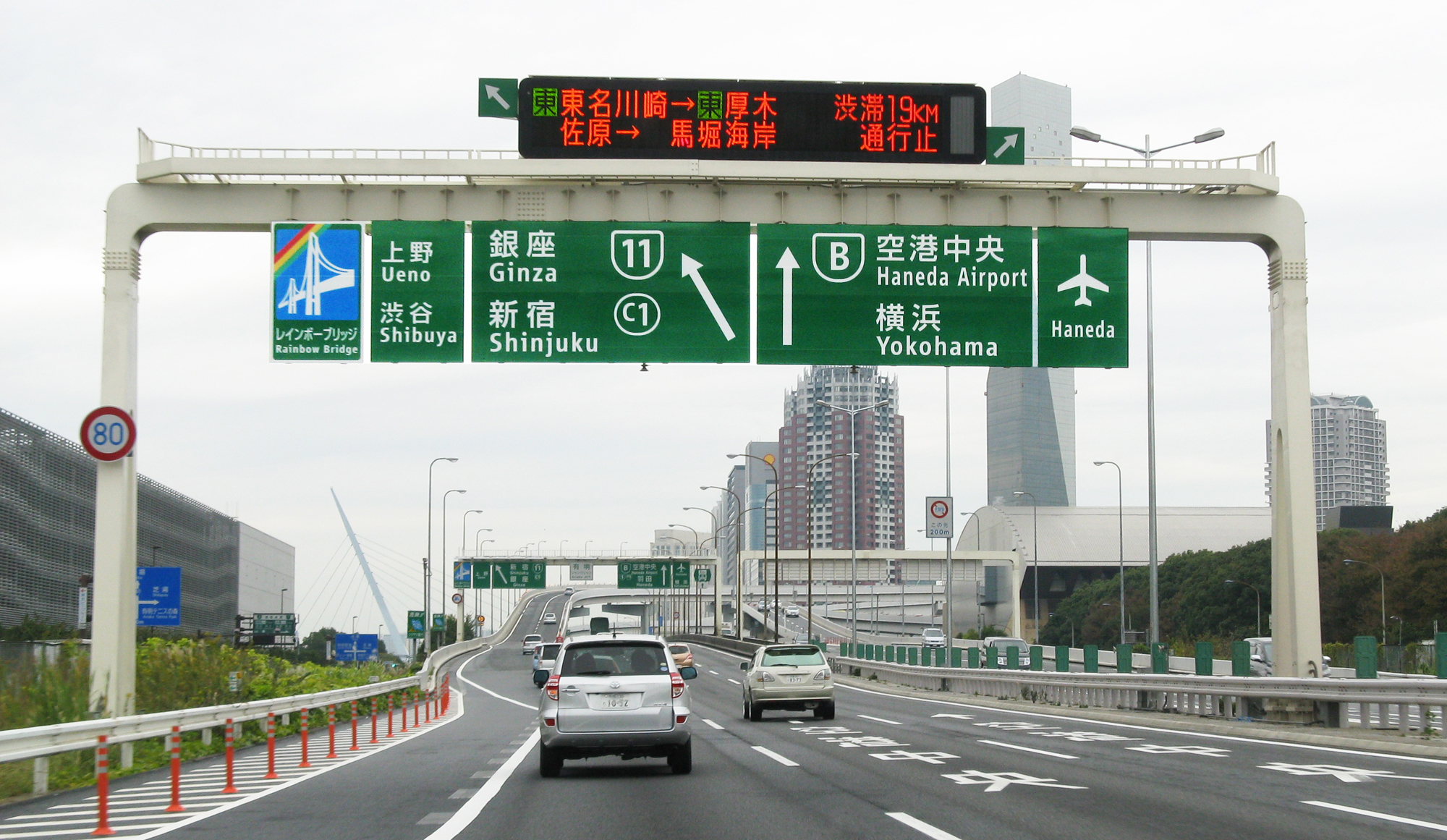
Ariake Junction

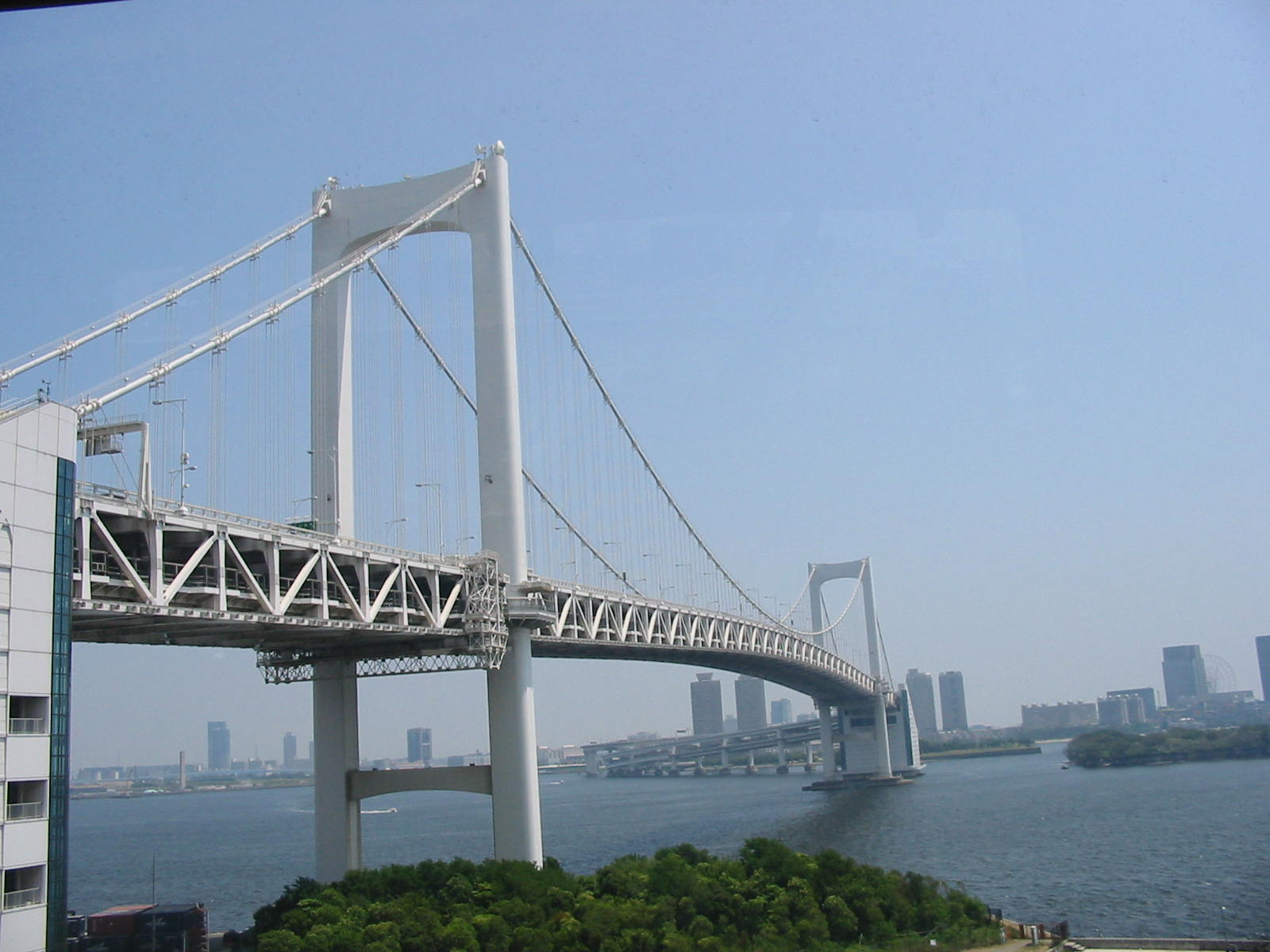
Rainbow Bridge on the Daiba Route

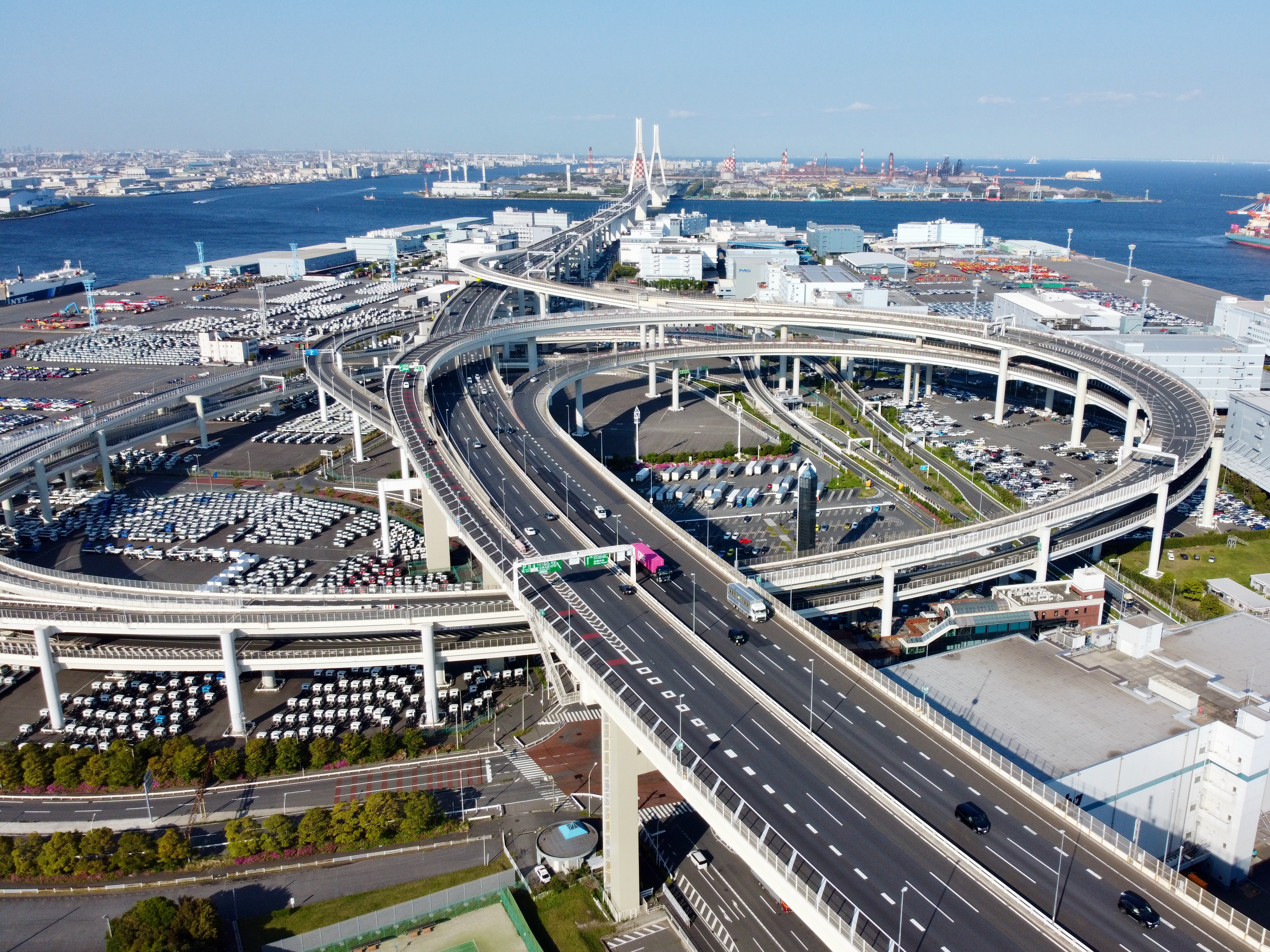
Daikoku Junction

== See also ==
- Expressways of Japan
- Japan Highway Public Corporation
