= Yokohama–Yokosuka Road =

Road in Kanagawa prefecture, Japan

Yokohama–Yokosuka Road
- 横浜横須賀道路

Route information
- Length: 36.9 km (22.9 mi)
- Existed: 1980–present
- Component highways: National Route 16

Major junctions
- From: Yokosuka, Kanagawa; National Route 16
- To: Yokohama; Bayshore Route

Location
- Country: Japan

Highway system
- National highways of Japan; Expressways of Japan

The Yokohama–Yokosuka Road (横浜横須賀道路 Yokohama-Yokosuka dōro, sometimes called the yoko yoko road

) is a toll road that links the city of Yokosuka, Kanagawa on the south end of the Miura Peninsula to Yokohama. It is numbered E16 under the "2016 Proposal for Realization of Expressway Numbering."

== Future ==
A branch line of the toll road will be incorporated into the southern portion of the Ken-Ō Expressway when the branch line is linked with the Shin-Shōnan Bypass.
