= Shin-Yokohama =

Coordinates: 35°30′34″N 139°36′55″E

Shin-Yokohama (新横浜, Shinyokohama) is a district of Kōhoku-ku, Yokohama, Kanagawa Prefecture, Japan.

== Buildings and attractions ==
- Shin-Yokohama Station
- Kita Shin-Yokohama Station
- Shin-Yokohama Ramen Museum
- Yokohama Arena
- Nissan Stadium
- Shin Yokohama Prince Hotel
- Winds Shin-Yokohama
- Yokohama Rapport
- Shin-Yokohama Park
- Kohoku Police Station
- Yokohama Rosai Hospital
