= E84 =

E84 may refer to:

- European route E84, a road
- King's Indian Defence, Sämisch Variation, Panno Main line, Encyclopaedia of Chess Openings code
- Shin-Shōnan Bypass and Seishō Bypass, route E84 in Japan
