= Japan National Route 467 =

National highway in Japan

National Route 467
- 国道467号
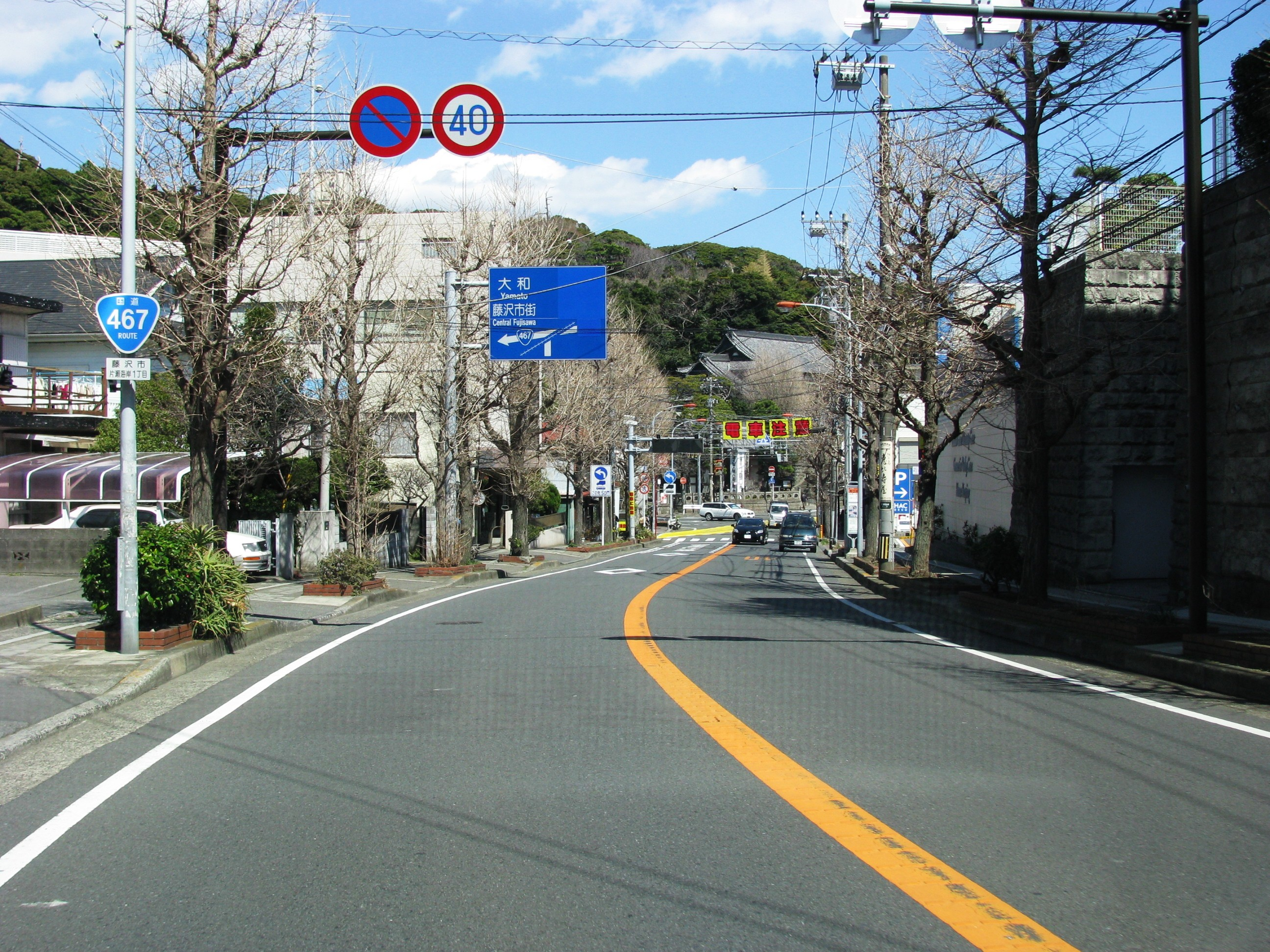

Route information
- Length: 21.6 km (13.4 mi)
- Existed: 1 April 1993–present

Major junctions
- North end: National Route 246 in Yamato, Kanagawa
- National Route 1
- South end: National Route 134 in Fujisawa, Kanagawa

Location
- Country: Japan

Highway system
- National highways of Japan; Expressways of Japan
← National Route 466	→ National Route 468

National Route 467 is a national highway of Japan connecting Yamato, Kanagawa and Fujisawa, Kanagawa in Japan, with a total length of 21.6 km (13.42 mi).
