= Ōiso =

Ōiso 大磯町
- Town
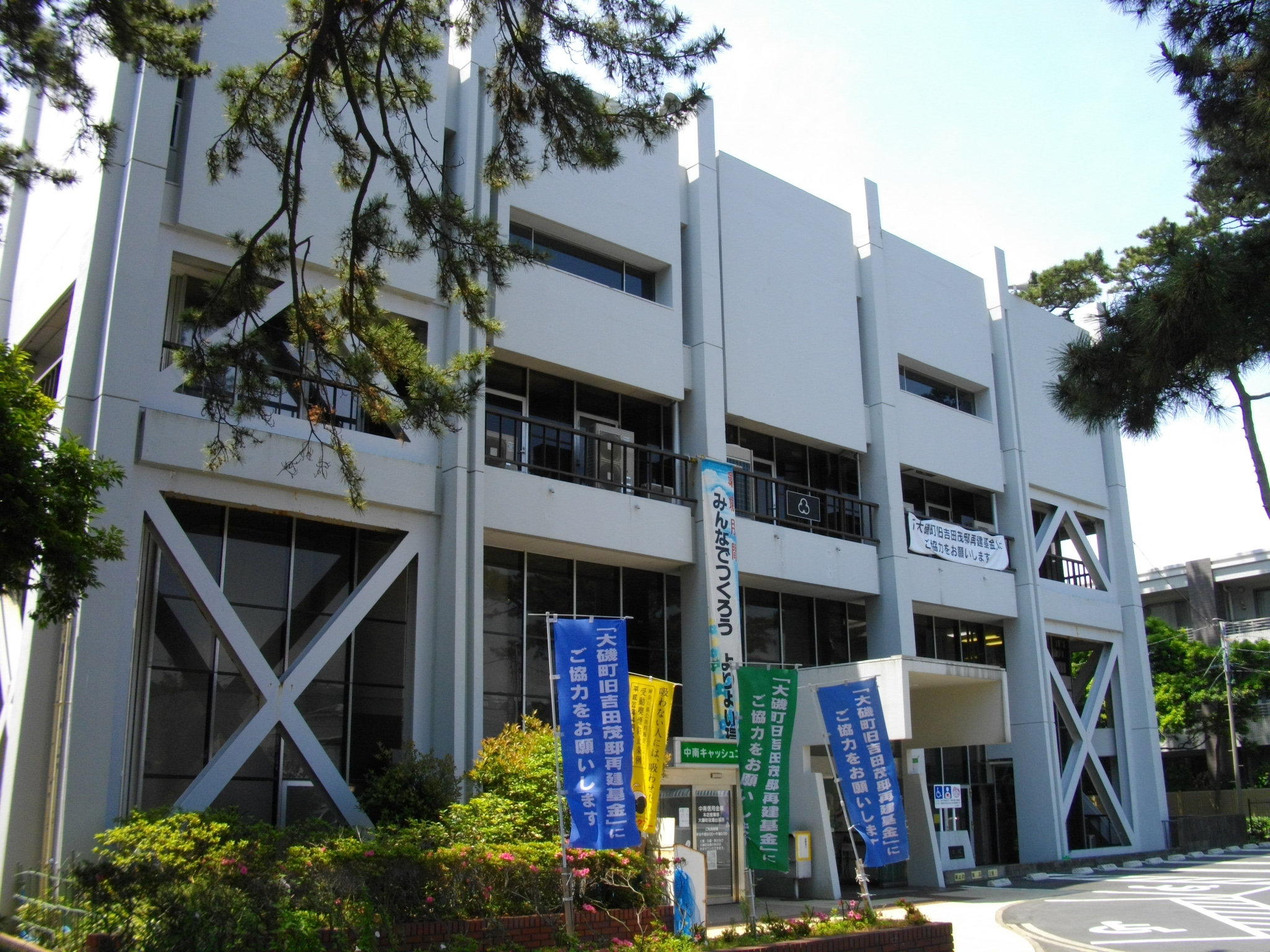
- Ōiso Town Hall

- Flag Seal

- Location of Ōiso in Kanagawa Prefecture

- Coordinates: 35°18′31″N 139°18′46″E
- Country: Japan
- Region: Kantō
- Prefecture: Kanagawa
- District: Naka

Area
  - Total: 17.18 km^{2} (6.63 sq mi)

Population (1 January 2023)
  - Total: 31,262
  - Density: 1,820/km^{2} (4,713/sq mi)
- Time zone: UTC+9 (Japan Standard Time)
- City symbols
- Tree: Japanese black pine & Camellia sasanqua
- Flower: Calystegia soldanella
- Bird: Common gull & White-bellied green pigeon
- Phone number: 0463-61-4100
- Address: 183 Ōiso, Ōiso-machi, Naka-gun, Kanagawa-ken 255-8555
- Website: Official website

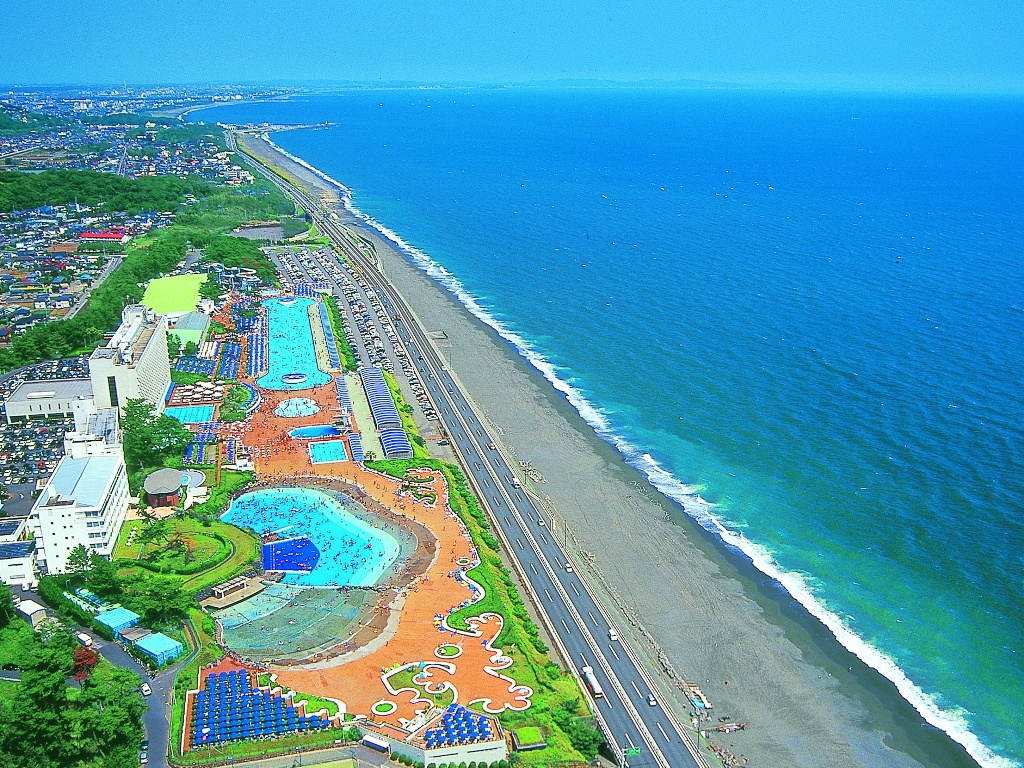
Ōiso Long Beach resort

Ōiso (大磯町, Ōiso-machi) is a town located in Kanagawa Prefecture, Japan. As of 1 January 2023, the town had an estimated population of 31,262 and a population density of 1820 persons per km². The total area of the town is 17.18 square kilometres (6.63 sq mi).

== Geography ==
Ōiso is located on the coastline of central Kanagawa Prefecture, facing Sagami Bay of the Pacific Ocean. The area is generally hilly, rising to Mount Koma (168 metres) in the northwest of the centre of town. The coastline of Ōiso is sandy and is regarded as the western end of the Shōnan area. Ōiso remains a popular beach resort and holiday spot for residents of Tokyo.

=== Surrounding municipalities ===
Kanagawa Prefecture

- Hiratsuka
- Ninomiya

=== Climate ===
Ōiso has a humid subtropical climate (Köppen Cfa) characterized by warm summers and cool winters with light to no snowfall. The average annual temperature in Ōiso is 15.8 °C. The average annual rainfall is 2144 mm with September as the wettest month. The temperatures are highest on average in August, at around 25.7 °C, and lowest in January, at around 5.2 °C.

== Demographics ==
Per Japanese census data, the population of Ōiso has grown steadily over the past century, with a slight drop from 2010 to 2020.

Historical population
Year	Pop.	±%
1920	12,984	—
1930	14,266	+9.9%
1940	15,506	+8.7%
1950	21,595	+39.3%
1960	22,278	+3.2%
1970	26,154	+17.4%
1980	29,931	+14.4%
1990	31,599	+5.6%
2000	32,259	+2.1%
2010	33,032	+2.4%
2020	31,634	−4.2%

== History ==
Ōiso is the ancient centre of Sagami Province. The exact location of the Nara period provincial government of Sagami Province is unknown, but tradition and the place name "Kōzu" place its probable location within the boundaries of present-day Ōiso.

As a minor coastal settlement, Ōiso was under the control of the later Hōjō clan of Odawara during the Sengoku period. In the Edo period, it was nominally part of Odawara Domain, and developed as Ōiso-juku, a post town on the Tōkaidō connecting Edo with Kyoto. After the Meiji Restoration and with the establishment of the district system in 1878, it came under the control of Yurugi District (淘綾郡, Yurugi-gun). Ōiso became a town on 1 April 1889 with the creation of the modern municipalities system. Blessed with a temperate climate, and with convenient access to Tokyo due to the Tōkaidō Main Line railway, it was favoured as a seaside health resort by politicians and literary figures during the Meiji period after a glowing report on its location was written by noted physician Matsumoto Jun. Prime Minister Itō Hirobumi, Yamagata Aritomo, Saionji Kinmochi and Ōkuma Shigenobu, Foreign Minister Mutsu Munemitsu, writer Shimazaki Toson and zaibatsu founder Yasuda Zenjirō had summer residences in Ōiso. This popularity continued into the postwar era, and Prime Minister Shigeru Yoshida also had a residence in Ōiso to which he retired after leaving politics. The former Itō, Yoshida and Shimazaki residences have been preserved as memorial museums.

Ōiso merged with neighbouring town Kokufu on 1 December 1954.

== Government ==
Ōiso has a mayor-council form of government with a directly elected mayor and a unicameral town council of 14 members. Ōiso, together with neighboring Ninomiya, contributes one member to the Kanagawa Prefectural Assembly. In terms of national politics, the town is part of Kanagawa 15th district of the lower house of the Diet of Japan.

== Economy ==
The local economy of Ōiso is based primarily on seasonal tourism, agriculture and commercial fishing. The town is also a bedroom community for both Tokyo/Yokohama and Odawara

== Education ==
Ōiso has one public elementary schools and one public middle schools operated by the town government. The town has one public high school operated by the Kanagawa Prefectural Board of Education. There is also one private elementary school, middle school and high school. The private Seisa University has a campus at Ōiso.

== Transportation ==
=== Railway ===
JR East - Tōkaidō Main Line

- Ōiso

=== Highway ===
- Odawara-Atsugi Road
- National Route 1 (from Tokyo to Osaka, Osaka)
- National Route 134
- Seishō Bypass

== Sister cities ==
- Dayton, Ohio, United States, since 1968
- (Japan) Komoro, Nagano, since September 1968
- Racine, Wisconsin, United States
- (Japan) Yamaguchi, Nagano, since April, 1973

== Local attractions ==
There are several tourist attractions.

- Sagichō Fire Festival
- Shigitatsu-an

=== Wildlife ===
Terugasaki in Ōiso is known as location where the White-bellied green pigeons come to drink saltwater.

== Notable people from Ōiso ==
- Soeda Azenbō, street musician of the 19th century
- Eijiro Ozaki, actor
- Tatsuo Satō, director
- Miki Sawada, benefactor and social worker
