= Shigitatsu-an =

Coordinates: 35°18′40.4″N 139°18′48.6″E

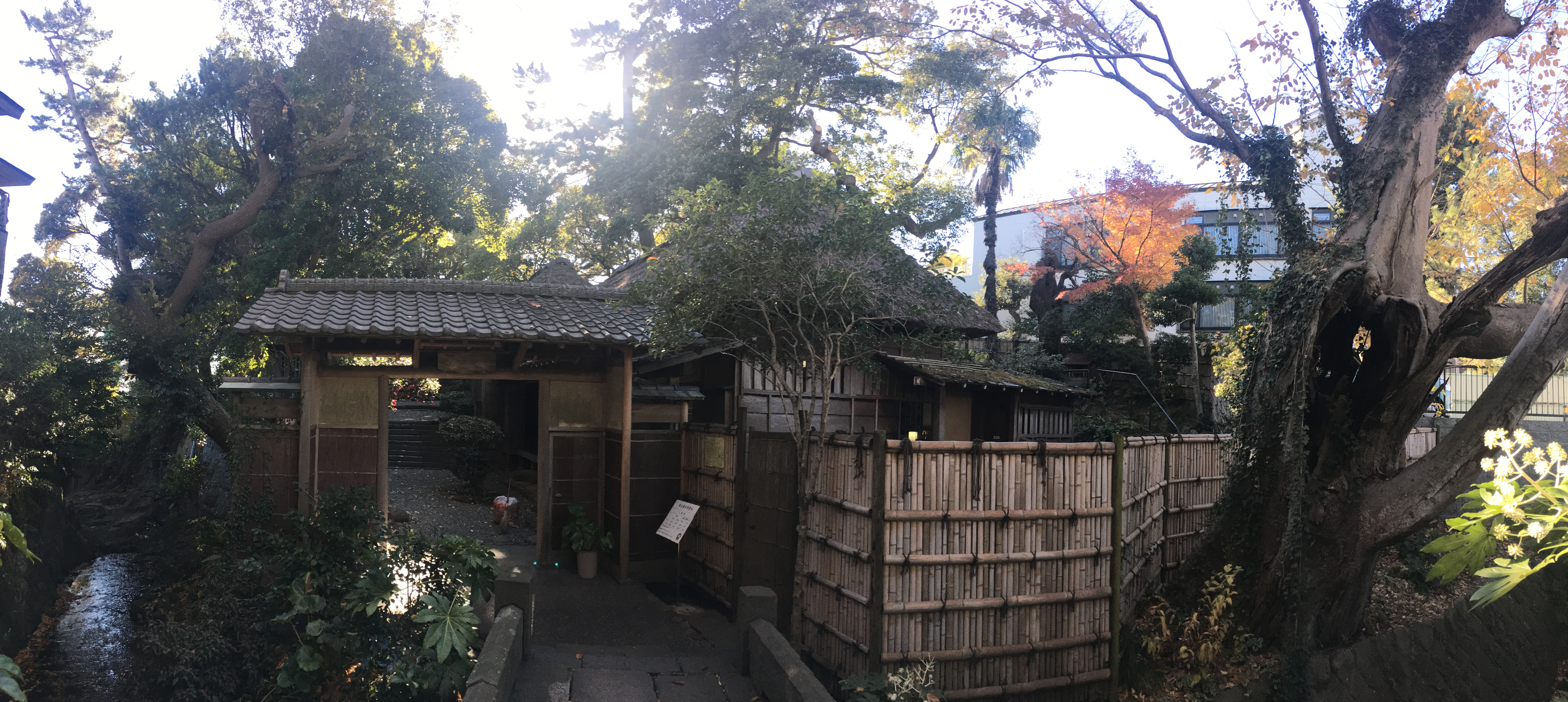
The entrance to Shigitatsu-an, Ōiso, Japan

Shigitatsu-an (Japanese: 鴫立庵) is a haikai dojo (Japanese: 俳諧道場) in Ōiso, Kanagawa, Japan, where people learn haiku poetry from the master there or from each other. It is one of the three important such dojo, the other two being Rakushi-sha (落柿舎) in Sagano, Kyoto, and Mumei-an (無名庵) in Ōtsu, Shiga.

Shigitasu-an was built in 1664 by Sōsetsu (崇雪) as a humble hut on the rivulet, Shigitatsu-sawa, Ōiso, where the 12th century waka poet, monk Saigyō, was said to write one of his most famous poems which was later included in the Shin Kokin Wakashū:

Original Japanese:
こころなき 身にもあはれは 知られけり
鴫立沢の秋の夕暮

In Romaji:
Kokoro naki mi nimo aware wa shirare keri
Shigitatsu-sawa no aki no yūgure

Translation:
Known to me who has denied joy and sorrow of this world is
The autumn scene of the rivulet where sandpipers walk at dusk.

In 1694, Michikaze Ōyodo (大淀三千風) became the master at Shigitatsu-an. In 1768, it was re-established by Chōsui Shirai (白井鳥酔). Currently, Motoi Ei (ja:本井英) is the 23rd master (2020-).

Shigitatsu-an was built on Tokaido, the main thoroughfare between Edo and Kyoto, which is now National Route 1. There stands a stele erected by Oiso Town that the word "Shōnan" was first mentioned by Sosetsu introducing Shigitatsu-an to the passers-by.

== Gallery ==
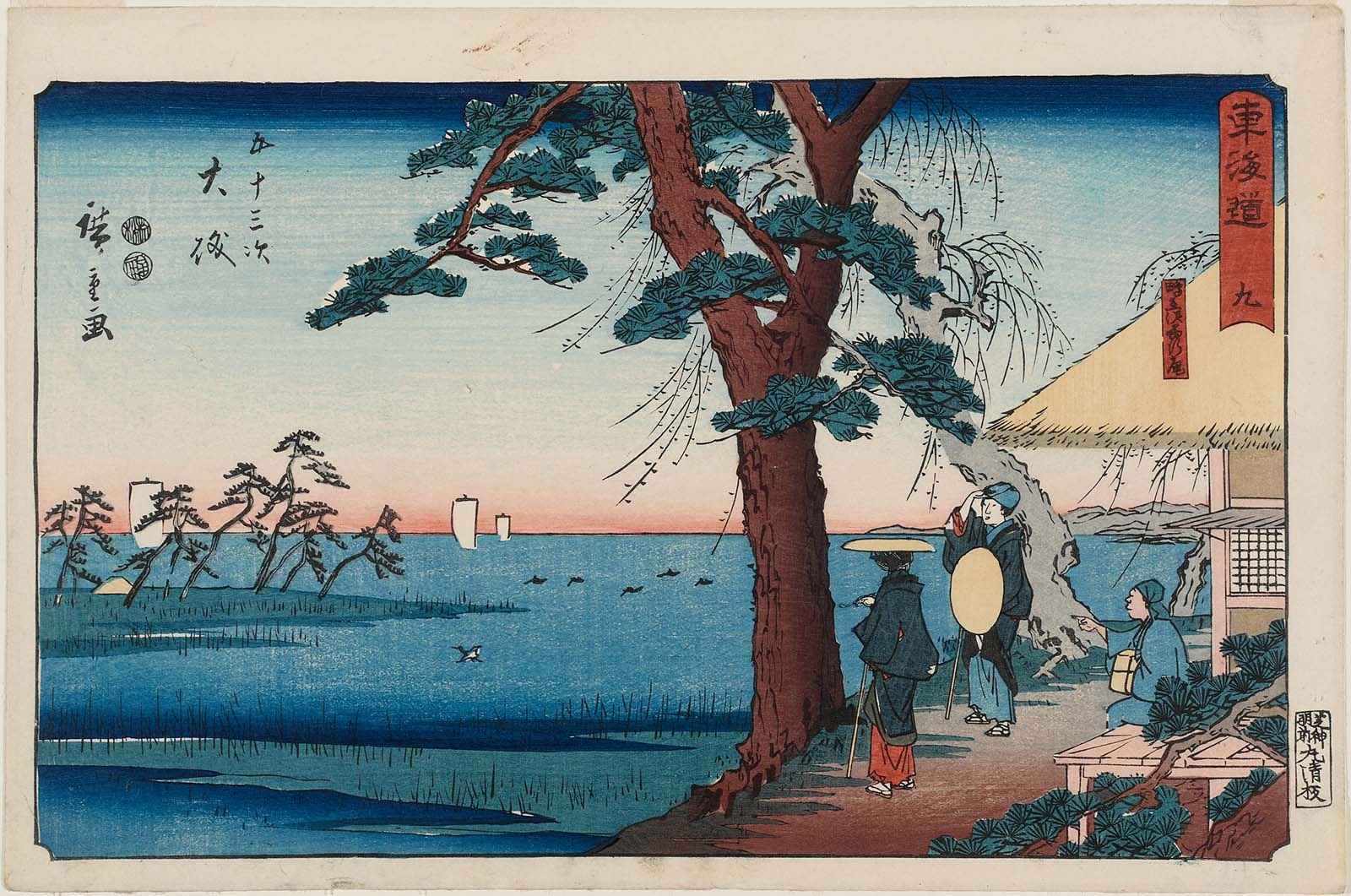
Hiroshige

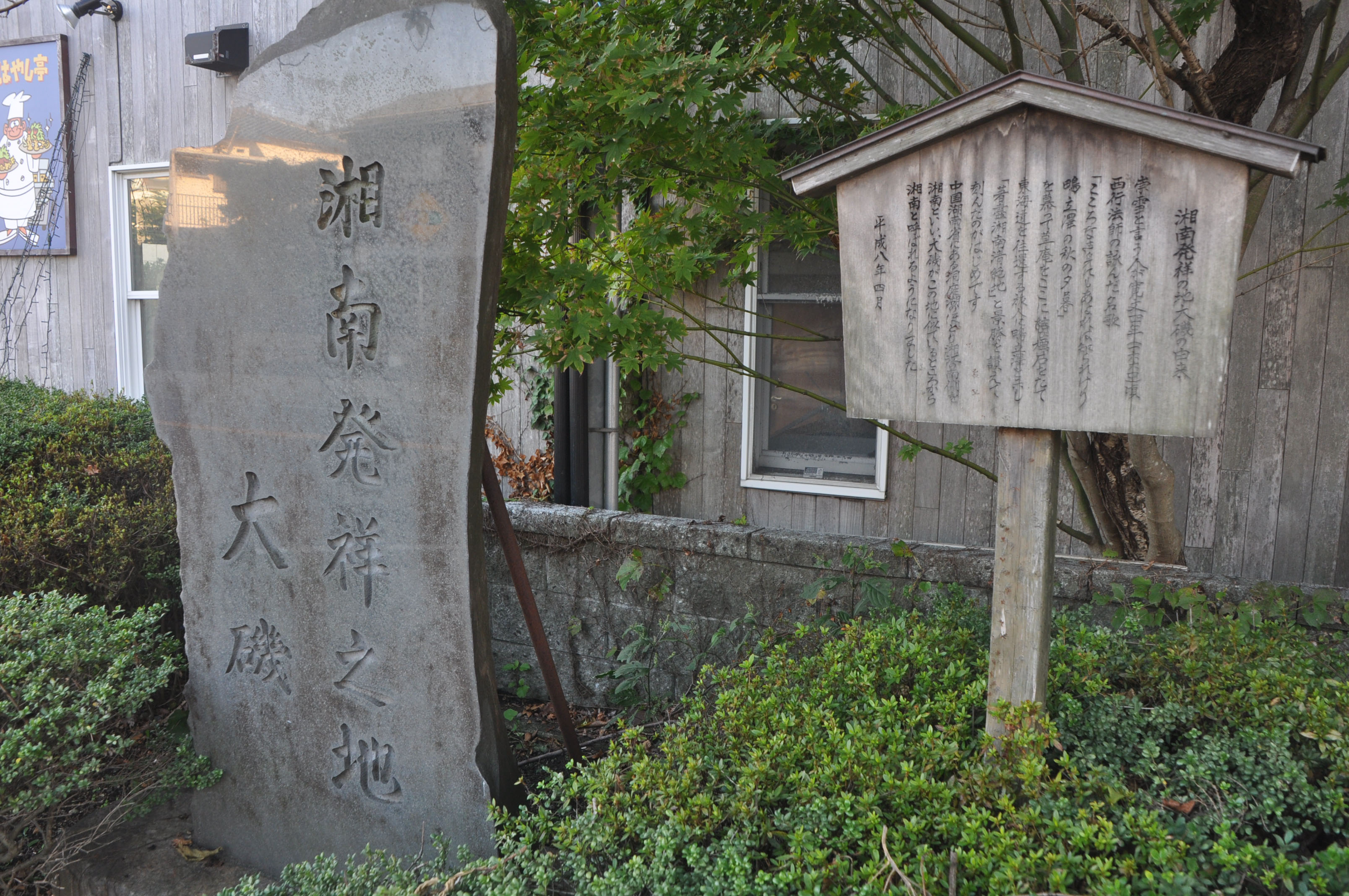
A stele erected by the town of Oiso, Kanagawa: "Shōnan" was first used in 1664, when Shigitatu-an was established by Sōsetsu.

Various views of Shigitatsu-an

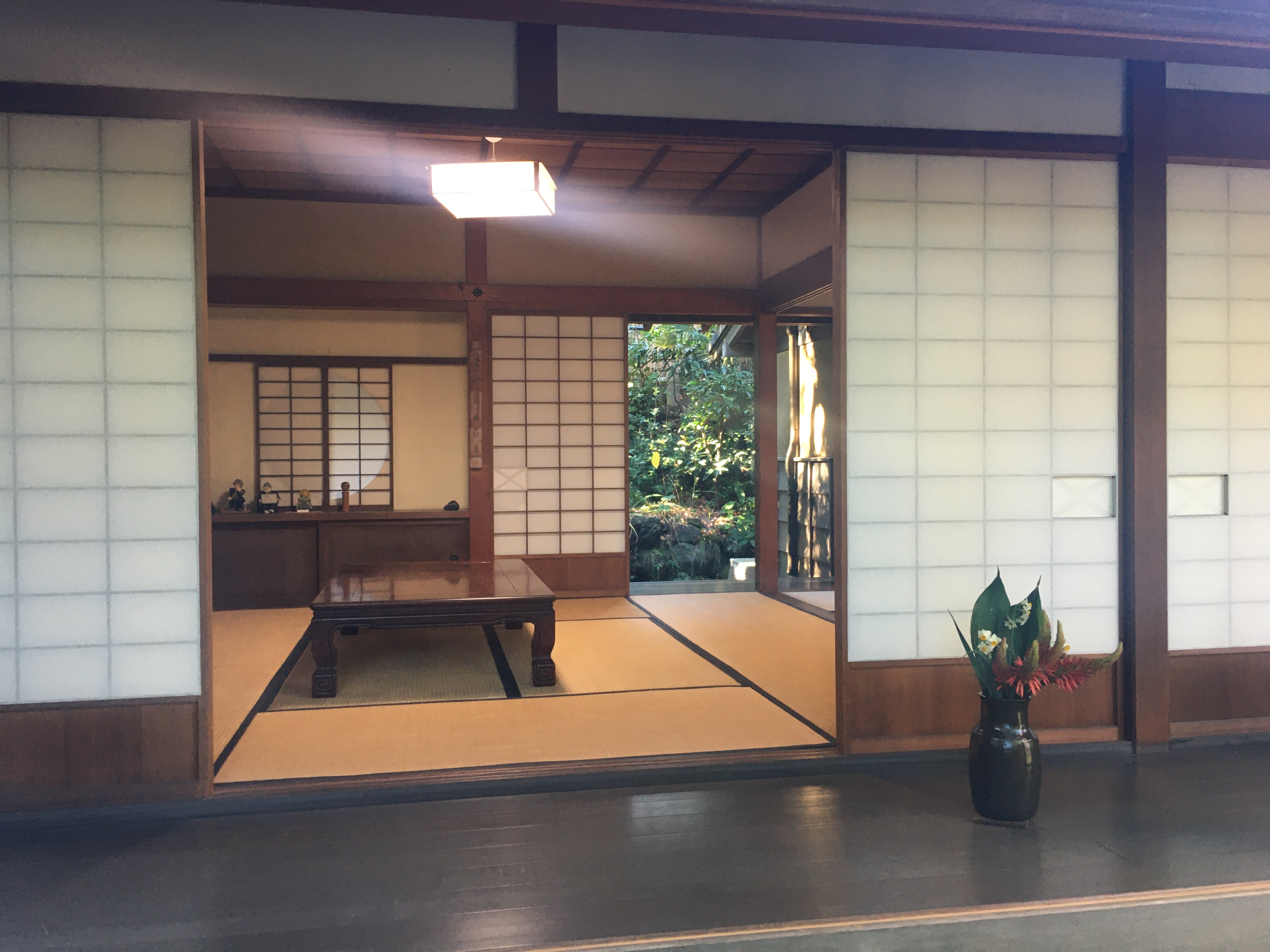
Inside view

== See also ==
- Ōiso, Kanagawa
- Saigyō
- Acer palmatum - A Japanese maple named "Red Shigitastu-sawa"
