= Hakone Shindō =

Toll road in Hakone, Kanagawa, Japan

Coordinates: 35°13′0″N 139°4′19″E

Hakone Shindō
- 国道1号
- 箱根新道

Route information
- Length: 13.8 km (8.6 mi)
- Existed: 1962–present

Major junctions
- From: Yamazaki Interchange in Hakone, Kanagawa; Odawara-Hakone Road; National Route 1
- To: Hakonetōge Interchange in Hakone, Kanagawa; National Route 1

Location
- Country: Japan

Highway system
- National highways of Japan; Expressways of Japan

The Hakone Shindō (箱根新道, Hakone Shindō) (lit. New Hakone Road) is a 2-laned toll road in Hakone, Kanagawa, Japan. It is owned and managed by Central Nippon Expressway Company.

== Overview ==
Officially the road is designated as a bypass for National Route 1. It is also classified as a road for motor vehicles only (自動車専用道路, Jidōsha Senyō Dōro) and access is controlled with interchanges in a similar manner to national expressways in Japan. However unlike most other roads operated by Central Nippon Expressway Company, the Hakone Shindō is not designed for high speeds due to the steep gradient and sharp turns.

The road originates in the town of Hakone and follows a westerly course, ascending into mountainous areas. The road terminates at Hakone Pass, where the road meets the old Tōkaidō Highway and which serves as the boundary separating Kanagawa and Shizuoka Prefectures. Beyond Hakone Pass National Route 1 descends from the mountains into the city of Mishima to the west.

Tolls are collected at a toll plaza near the eastern terminus. The toll for a regular passenger car is 250 yen. Electronic Toll Collection (ETC) is accepted for payment, however no discount programs are in effect. Since there are no toll collection points between Hakonetōge Interchange and Ashinoko-Taikan Interchange this section of the road is effectively free.

== List of interchanges and features ==
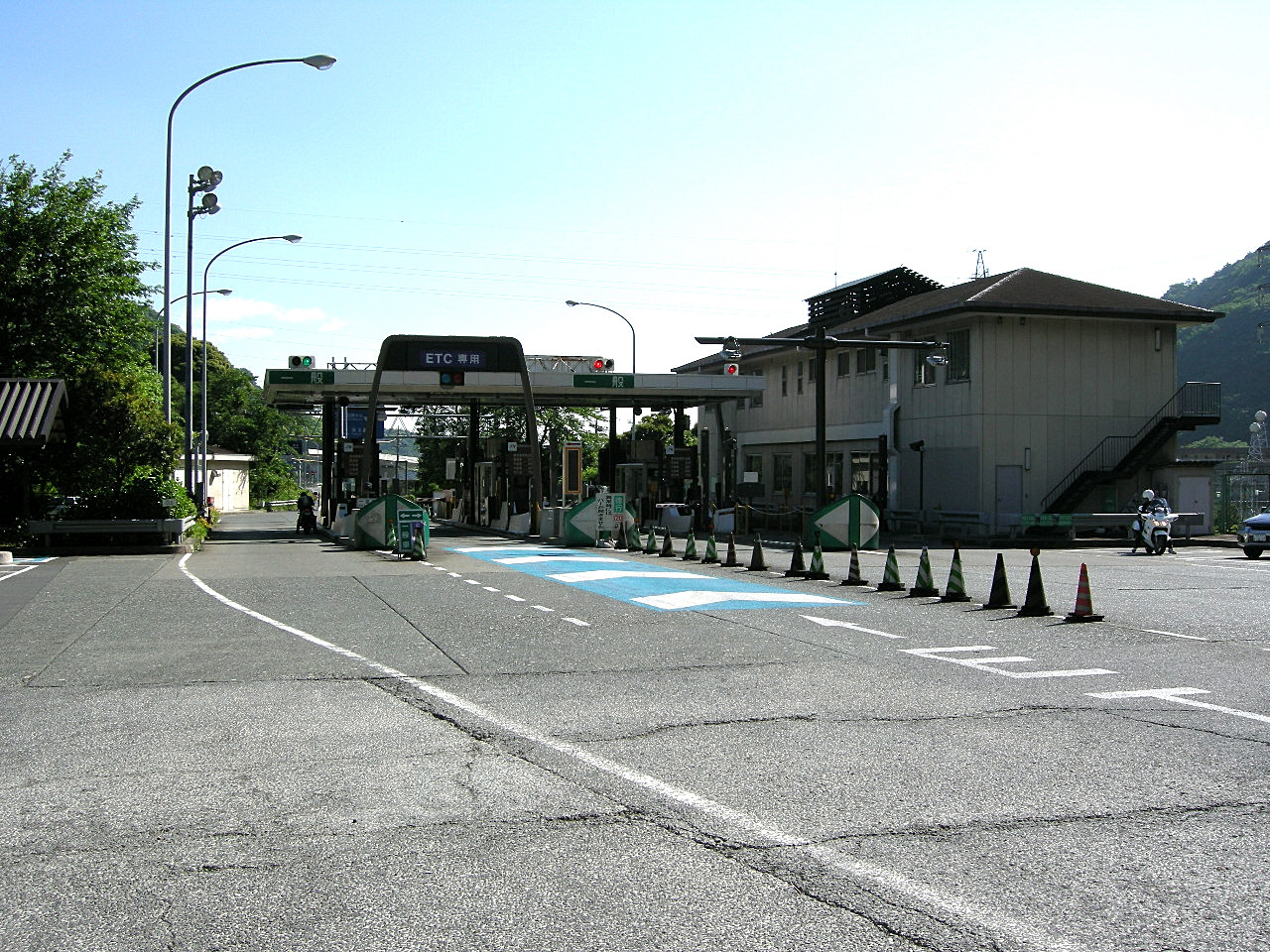
Hakone Toll Gate

- IC - interchange, PA - parking area, BS - bus stop, TB - toll gate

Name	Connections	Dist. from Origin	Notes	Location (all in Kanagawa)
Through to Odawara-Hakone Road
Yamazaki IC	National Route 1	0.0		Hakone
Hakone PA/ TB		↓		Hakone
Sukumokawa IC	Pref. Route 732 (Yumoto Motohakone Route)	4.0	Hakonetōge-bound exit, Yamazaki-bound entrance only	Hakone
Hatakejuku Bus Stop		↓		Hakone
Ashinoko-Taikan IC	Pref. Route 75 (Yugawara Hakone Sengokubara Route)	12.2		Hakone
Hakonetōge IC	National Route 1	13.8		Hakone

== See also ==
- Hakone Turnpike, a high-speed bypass of Hakone Shindō
