= Odawara-Atsugi Road =

Toll road in Kanagawa Prefecture, Japan

Coordinates: 35°19′07″N 139°16′08″E

Odawara-Atsugi Road
- 国道271号
- 小田原厚木道路
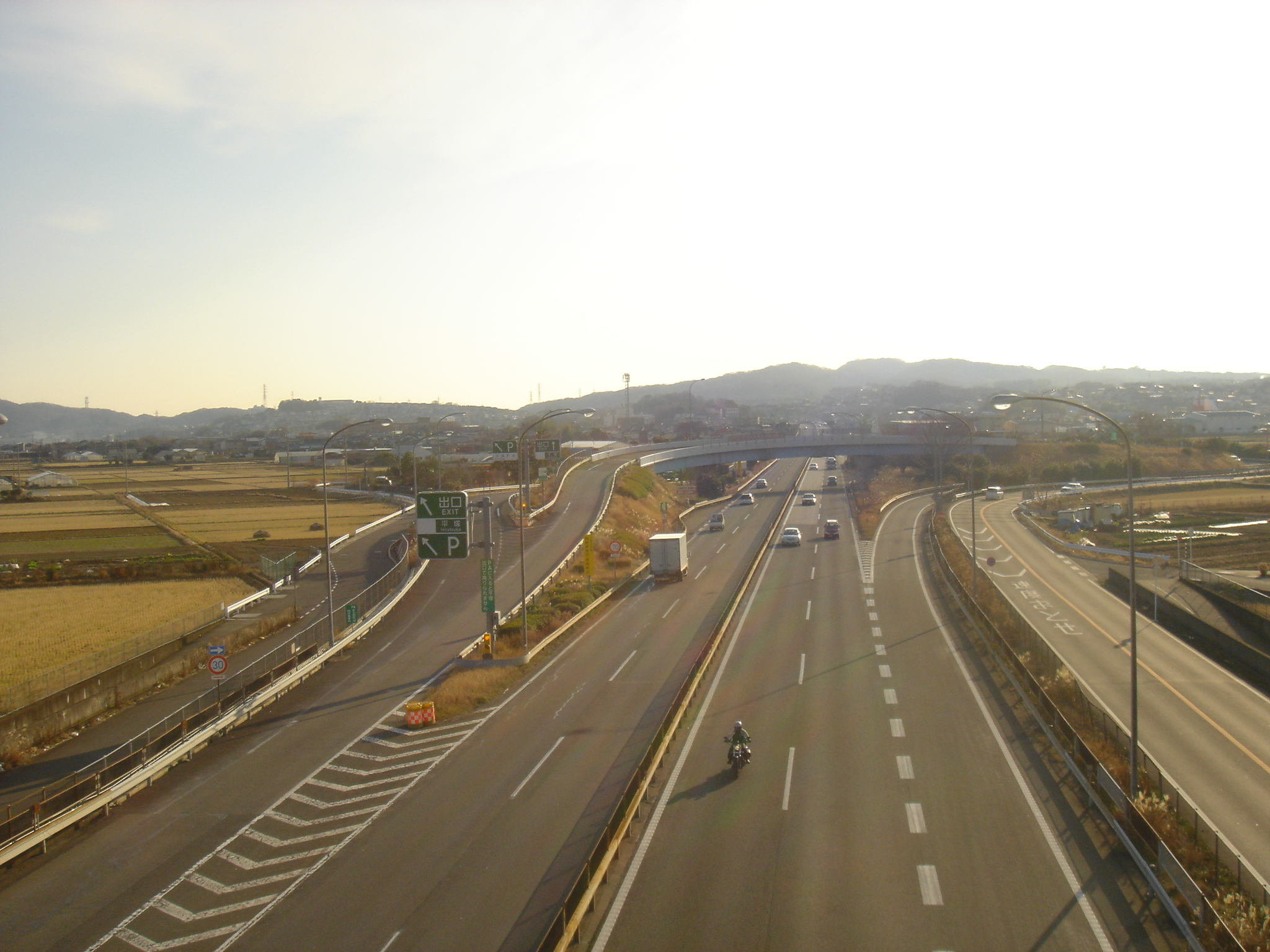

Route information
- Length: 33.1 km (20.6 mi)
- Existed: 1969–present

Major junctions
- From: Odawara-nishi Interchange in Odawara, Kanagawa; Seishō Bypass
- To: Atsugi Interchange in Atsugi, Kanagawa; Tōmei Expressway; National Route 129

Location
- Country: Japan
- Major cities: Hiratsuka, Isehara

Highway system
- National highways of Japan; Expressways of Japan
← National Route 270	→ National Route 272

The Odawara-Atsugi Road (小田原厚木道路, Odawara Atsugi Dōro) is a 4-laned toll road in Kanagawa Prefecture, Japan. It is owned and managed by Central Nippon Expressway Company.

== Route description ==
Officially the road is designated as National Route 271 as well as E85 under their "Expressway Numbering System." The entire road is built to a standard similar to that of an urban expressway and is classified as a road for motor vehicles only (自動車専用道路, Jidōsha Senyō Dōro) (motor vehicles must have a displacement of at least 125 cc).

The road connects western Kanagawa Prefecture (including the popular onsen resort town of Hakone) with Tokyo through the Tōmei Expressway. The route parallels Route 1 until Ōiso, where it then follows a northeasterly route through Hiratsuka and Isehara before terminating in Atsugi.

The road was opened in 1969 with 2 lanes. Expansion to 4 lanes was completed in 1978.

For toll collection purposes the road is divided into an Odawara section and an Atsugi section, with Ōiso Interchange as the dividing point. The toll for a normal passenger car to use one section is 350 yen.

== List of interchanges and features ==
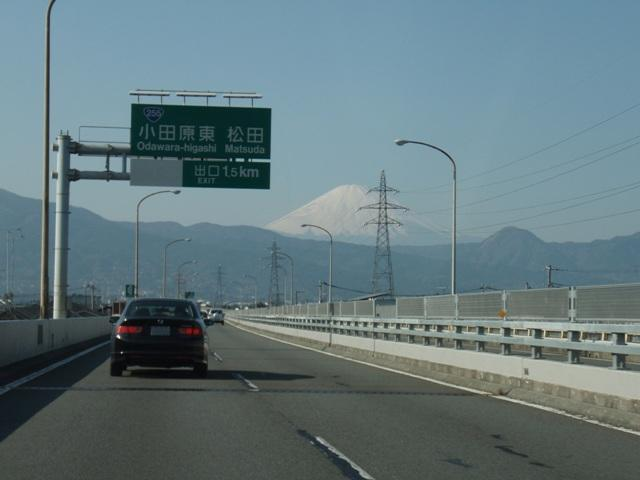
Odawara-higashi Interchange with Mount Fuji in the background

- IC - interchange, PA - parking area, TB - toll gate

Name	Connections	Dist. from Origin	Notes	Speed Limit	Location (all in Kanagawa)
Odawara-nishi IC	Seishō Bypass	0.0		60 km/h	Odawara
Ogikubo IC		1.8	Odawara-bound exit, Atsugi-bound entrance only	60 km/h	Odawara
Odawara-higashi IC	National Route 255	6.7		60 km/h	Odawara
Odawara Toll Plaza/ PA		↓	PA: Odawara-bound only	60 km/h	Odawara
Ninomiya IC		13.7		60 km/h	Ninomiya
Ōiso IC/ PA		17.2	PA: Atsugi-bound only	60 km/h	Ōiso
Ōiso IC/ PA		17.2	PA: Atsugi-bound only	80 km/h	Ōiso
Hiratsuka Toll Gate		↓		80 km/h	Hiratsuka
Hiratsuka IC/ PA	Pref. Route 62 (Hiratsuka Hadano Route)	23.2	PA: Odawara-bound only	80 km/h	Hiratsuka
Isehara IC	Pref. Route 44 (Isehara Fujisawa Route)	26.8	Atsugi-bound exit, Odawara-bound entrance only	80 km/h	Isehara
Atsugi-nishi IC	Pref. Route 604 (Aikō Ishida Teishajō Sakai Route)	30.8		80 km/h	Atsugi
Atsugi-nishi IC	Pref. Route 604 (Aikō Ishida Teishajō Sakai Route)	30.8		60 km/h	Atsugi
Atsugi IC	Tōmei Expressway; National Route 129	33.1	Route 129 inaccessible from Odawara	60 km/h	Atsugi
