= Japan National Route 255 =

Road in Kanagawa prefecture, Japan

National Route 255
- 国道255号
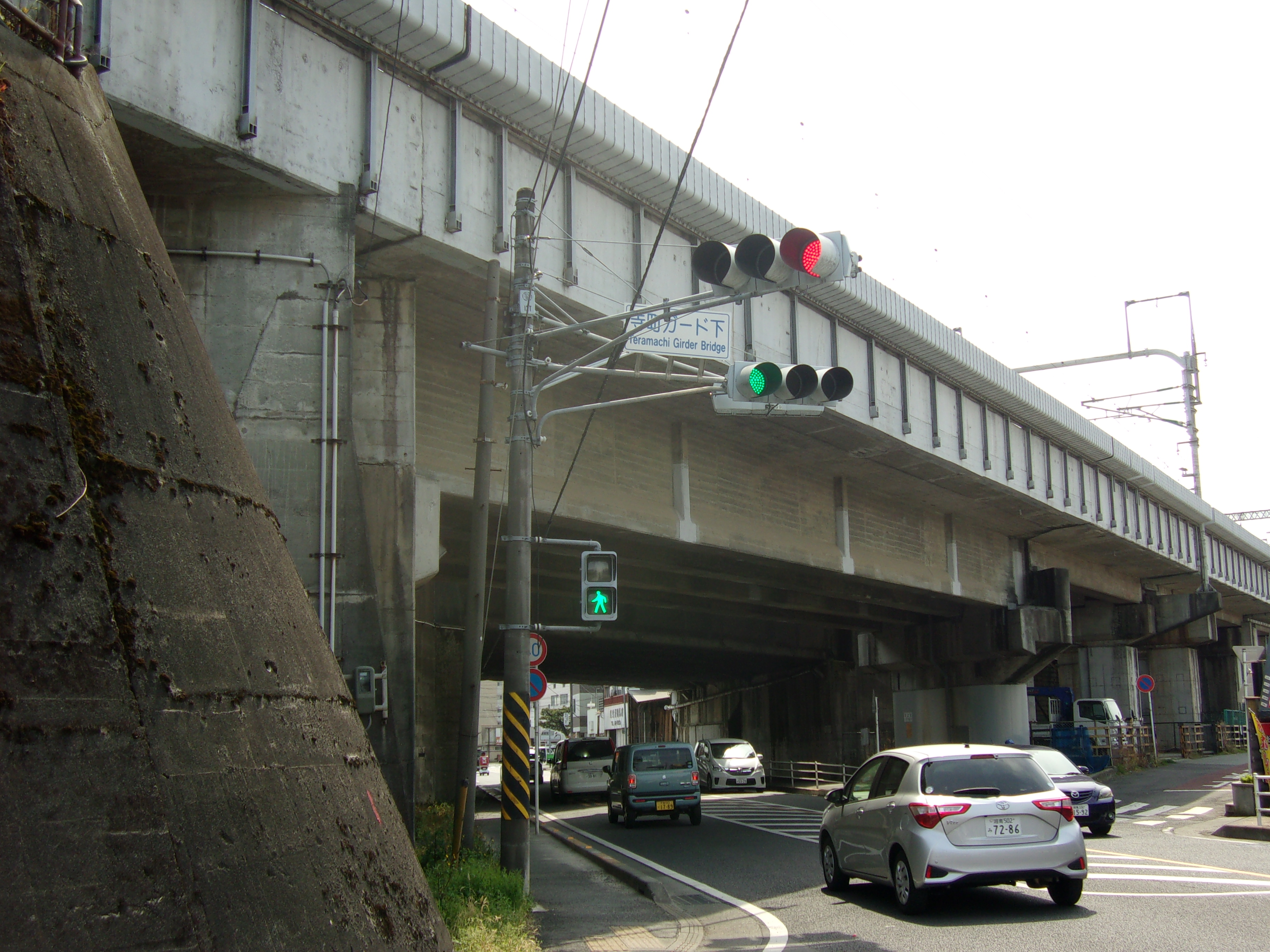

Route information
- Length: 20.3 km (12.6 mi)

Major junctions
- North end: National Route 246 in Hadano, Kanagawa
- Tōmei Expressway; National Route 271 (Odawara-Atsugi Road)
- South end: National Route 1 in Odawara, Kanagawa

Location
- Country: Japan

Highway system
- National highways of Japan; Expressways of Japan
← National Route 254	→ National Route 256

National Route 255 is a national highway of Japan connecting Hadano, Kanagawa and Odawara, Kanagawa in Japan, with a total length of 20.3 km (12.61 mi).
