= Japan National Route 1 =

Road from Tokyo to Osaka in Japan

National Route 1
- 国道1号
- Japan National Route 1 highlighted in red

Route information
- Length: 760.9 km (472.8 mi)
- Existed: 4 December 1952–present

Major junctions
- East end: National Route 4 / National Route 15 / National Route 17 in Nihonbashi, Chūō, Tokyo
- National Route 42; National Route 255; National Route 134; National Route 129; National Route 467; National Route 16 / National Route 133
- West end: National Route 2 / National Route 176 in Umeda, Kita-ku, Osaka

Location
- Country: Japan

Highway system
- National highways of Japan; Expressways of Japan
← National Route 507	→ National Route 2

National Route 1 (国道1号, Kokudō Ichi-gō) is a major highway on the island of Honshū in Japan. It connects Chūō, Tokyo in the Kantō region with the city of Osaka, Osaka Prefecture in the Kansai region, passing through the Chūbu region en route. It follows the old Tōkaidō westward from Tokyo to Kyoto, and the old Kyo Kaidō from there to Osaka. Between Tokyo and Aichi Prefecture it parallels the Tomei Expressway; from there to Mie Prefecture, the Higashi-Meihan Expressway, and from Shiga Prefecture to Osaka, the Meishin Expressway. It has a total length of 760.9 kilometers (472.8 mi). At its eastern terminus in Nihonbashi, Chūō, Tokyo, it meets National Routes 4, 6, 14, 15, 17, and 20. At its western terminus in Umeda, Kita-ku, Osaka, it links with Routes 2, 25, 26 and other highways.

National Route 1 links Tokyo to the important prefectural capitals of Yokohama (Kanagawa Prefecture), Shizuoka, Nagoya (Aichi Prefecture), Otsu (Shiga Prefecture), Kyoto, and Osaka. It is the modern incarnation of the pre-modern Tōkaidō.

== Route description ==
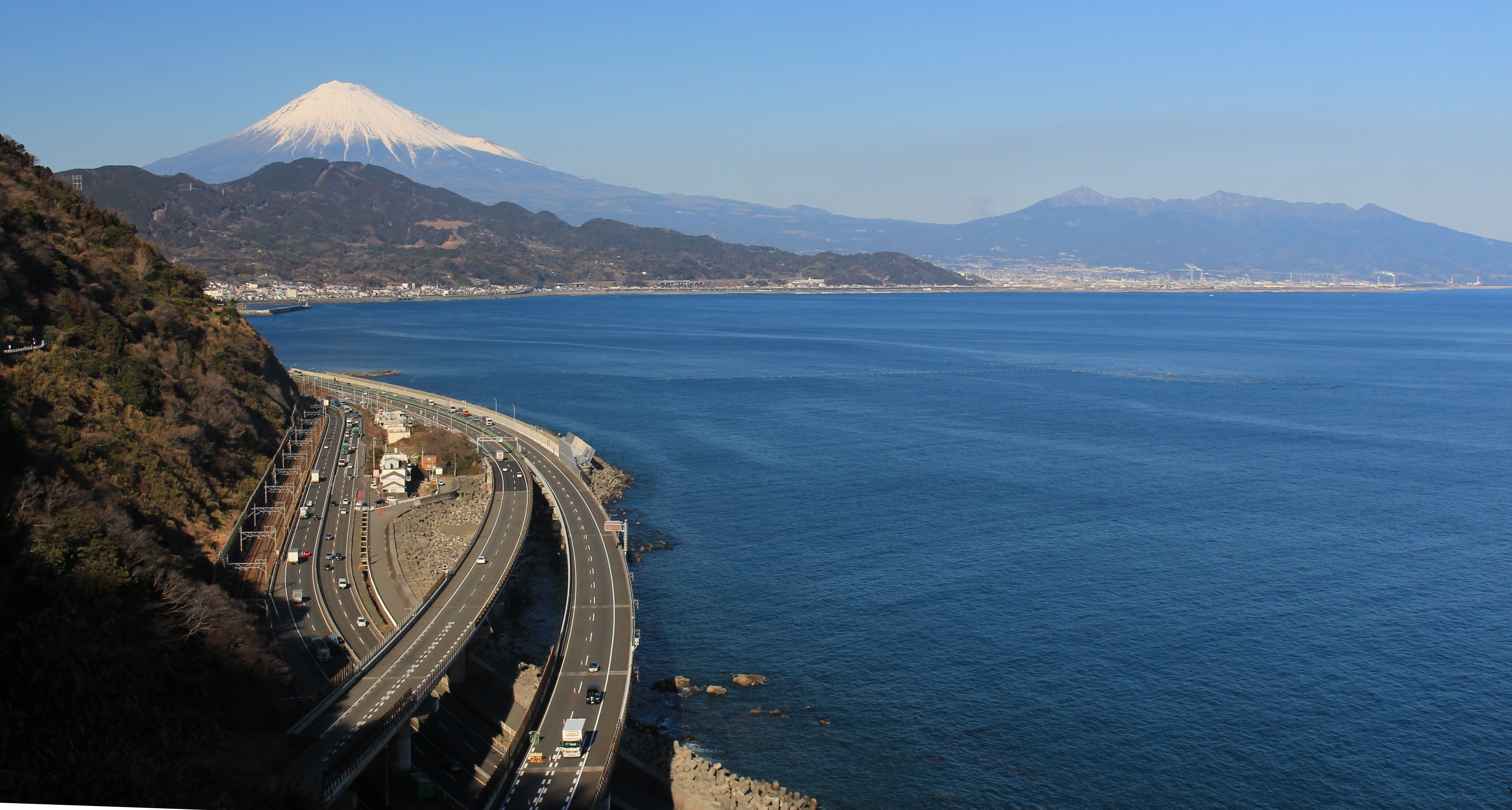
National Route 1 and the Tōmei Expressway traveling parallel to one another on the shore of Suruga Bay near Mount Fuji in Shizuoka Prefecture

The main line of National Route 1 has a length of 638.4 kilometers (396.7 mi). When bypasses signed as National Route 1 are included, its total distance increases to 777.9 kilometers (483.4 mi). Out of all of the national highways in Japan, it is the second longest land-based route after National Route 4, though National Route 58 is the longest route when seabound routes are factored in.

The highway's origin and eastern terminus lie at Nihonbashi in Tokyo's Chūō ward. At Nihonbashi it meets national routes 4, 6, 14, 15, 17, and 20. The highway passes through the cities of Kawasaki, Yokohama, Odawara, Numazu, Shizuoka, Hamamatsu, Nagoya, Yokkaichi, Ōtsu, and Kyoto. Its endpoint and western terminus lie in the Umeda district of Osaka's Kita ward. In Umeda, it has a junction with national routes 2, 26, 163, 165, 25, and 176.

=== Overlapping sections ===
- In Chuo: Route 15
- From the origin to Chiyoda (Sakuradamon intersection): Route 20
- In Yokohama City, from Takashima-cho intersection to Hamamatsucho intersection: Route 16
- From Odawara City to Hakone Town (Miyanoshita intersection): Route 138
- From Hamamatsu City (Shinohara intersection) to Kosai City (Okurado IC): Route 42

== History ==
National Route 1 was preceded by the Tōkaidō between Tokyo and Kyoto and the old Kyo Kaidō from Kyoto to Osaka. The road's construction was ordered by the first shōgun of the Edo period, Tokugawa Ieyasu. It served to link the old capital of Japan, Kyoto, to Tokugawa's new capital, Edo. The Tōkaidō's post stations, known in Japanese as shukuba, were captured by the printmaker Utagawa Hiroshige in his ukiyo-e prints, The Fifty-three Stations of the Tōkaidō.

In 1919, the first Road Act was passed, establishing a highway also called National Route 1 between Tokyo and the city of Shingū in Wakayama Prefecture partially along the current route. On 4 December 1952 the route was designated by the Cabinet of Japan as Primary National Highway 1 between Tokyo and Osaka, establishing the highway almost entirely along its current routing. On 1 April 1965 the route was redesignated as General National Route 1.

== Junction list ==
All junctions listed are at-grade intersections unless noted otherwise.

Prefecture	Location	km	mi	Destinations	Notes
Tokyo	Chuo			National Route 4 north – Asakusabashi, Aomori	Highway continues beyond eastern terminus as a concurrency of several national routes
Tokyo	Chuo			Nihonbashi Bridge (Inner Circular Route)	Eastern terminus of National Route 1; no direct access to Inner Circular Route
Tokyo	Chuo			National Route 15 – to Harumi Route, Ginza, Minamisuna, Eitaibashi	Western end of National Route 15 concurrency
Tokyo	Chiyoda			Metropolitan Route 403 – Kitaikebekuro, Shibuya	
Tokyo	Chiyoda			Metropolitan Route 404	
Tokyo	Chiyoda			Metropolitan Route 406	
Tokyo	Chiyoda			Metropolitan Route 304	
Tokyo	Chiyoda			Metropolitan Route 301 – Kudanshita, Kokyomae	
Tokyo	Chiyoda			National Route 20 – Shinjuku, Hanzomon	Western end of National Route 20 concurrency
Tokyo	Minato			Metropolitan Route 405 – Tameike, Shinbashi	
Tokyo	Minato			Metropolitan Route 319 – Roppongi	
Tokyo	Minato			Metropolitan Route 301 / Metropolitan Route 319	
Tokyo	Minato			Metropolitan Route 301 – to National Route 15, Fudanotsuji	
Tokyo	Minato			Metropolitan Route 305 – Ebisu / Metropolitan Route 415 – Tameike, Furukawabashi	
Tokyo	Minato			Metropolitan Route 312 – Meguro	
Tokyo	Shinagawa			Meguro Route north – to Inner Circular Route	Togoshi entrance and exit; entrance to northbound expressway, exit from southbound expressway
Tokyo	Shinagawa			Metropolitan Route 317 – Ohashi, Osaki	
Tokyo	Shinagawa			Metropolitan Route 317 – Shinagawa	
Tokyo	Shinagawa			Metropolitan Route 2 – Tengenjibashi	
Tokyo	Shinagawa			Metropolitan Route 420 – Musashikoyoma	
Tokyo	Ota			Metropolitan Route 318 – Omori	
Tokyo	Ota			Metropolitan Route 421	
Tokyo	Ota			Metropolitan Route 311 – Kamata, Shimo-Maruko Station	
Kanagawa	Kawasaki			National Route 409 (Tokyo-Wan Aqua-Line Expressway) – Ukishima, Kosugi, Mizonokuchi	
Kanagawa	Kawasaki			Prefectural Route 140 (Tomei Expressway) – Mizonokuchi, Kawasaki Station	
Kanagawa	Yokohama			Prefectural Route 14 – Tsunashima, Tsurumi Station	
Kanagawa	Yokohama			Prefectural Route 111 – to National Route 15, Kikuna	
Kanagawa	Yokohama			Prefectural Route 2 – Tsunashima	
Kanagawa	Yokohama			National Route 1 (Yokohama Bypass) – Odawara, Totsuka	Interchange; eastbound exit and westbound entrance
Kanagawa	Yokohama			Prefectural Route 12 – Rokkakabushi	
Kanagawa	Yokohama			National Route 15 – Kawasaki, Tsurumi	
Kanagawa	Yokohama			National Route 16 – Yokosuka, Sakuragicho	Eastern end of National Route 16 concurrency
Kanagawa	Yokohama			National Route 16 – Sagamihara, Yokosuka	Western end of National Route 16 concurrency
Kanagawa	Yokohama			Prefectural Route 84 – Kamakura	
Kanagawa	Yokohama			Yokohama–Yokosuka Road – to Tōmei Expressway, Yokosuka, Hachiōji	Kariba Interchange
Kanagawa	Yokohama			Prefectural Route 218 – Sakuragicho, Idogaya	
Kanagawa	Yokohama			National Route 16 – Isogo; Prefectural Route 17 – Hino, Shin-Yokohama, Higashi-Totsuka Station	
Kanagawa	Yokohama			National Route 1 west (Yokohama Bypass) – Odawara, Fujisawa; Prefectural Route 401 – Seya	
Kanagawa	Yokohama			Prefectural Route 22 east – Kaminagaya	Eastern end of Kanagawa Prefecture Route 22 concurrency
Kanagawa	Yokohama			Prefectural Route 22 (Chōgo Kaidō) west – to Yokohama Shindō, Isehara	Western end of Kanagawa Prefecture Route 22 concurrency
Kanagawa	Yokohama			National Route 1 (Yokohama Bypass)	Interchange; eastbound exit and westbound entrance
Kanagawa	Yokohama			Prefectural Route 23 – Ofuna, Shonandai	Interchange
Kanagawa	Yokohama			Prefectural Route 30 – Enoshima, Fujisawa	Interchange westbound; at-grade intersection eastbound
Kanagawa	Fujisawa			National Route 467	Interchange; no exits
Kanagawa	Fujisawa			Prefectural Route 43 – Atsugi, Yoda	
Kanagawa	Fujisawa			Shin-Shōnan Bypass west – to Ken-Ō Expressway, Odawara, Hiratsuka	No access from Shin-Shōnan Bypass to westbound National Route 1; Fujisawa Interchange
Kanagawa	Chigasaki			Prefectural Route 44 (Old Tōkaidō) east – Enoshima	Eastern end of Kanagawa Prefecture Route 44 concurrency
Kanagawa	Chigasaki			Prefectural Route 44 west – Atsugi, Isehara	Western end of Kanagawa Prefecture Route 44 concurrency
Kanagawa	Chigasaki			Prefectural Route 404 (Itchu-dōri) – to National Route 134, Shonan Life Town	
Kanagawa	Chigasaki			Shin-Shōnan Bypass – Yokohama, Fujisawa	Access only to eastbound traffic and from westbound traffic; Chigasaki-nishi Interchange
Kanagawa	Chigasaki			Prefectural Route 46 – to National Route 134, Enoshima, Samukawa	
Kanagawa	Hiratsuka			National Route 129 – to National Route 134, Atsugi	
Kanagawa	Hiratsuka			Prefectural Route 606 north – Hadano, Isehara	
Kanagawa	Hiratsuka			Prefectural Route 61 – to National Route 134, Isehara	
Kanagawa	Oiso			Prefectural Route 62 – Hadano	Eastern end of Kanagawa Prefecture Route 62 concurrency
Kanagawa	Oiso			Prefectural Route 62 – to National Route 134; Prefectural Route 609 – Guzo	Western end of Kanagawa Prefecture Route 62 concurrency
Kanagawa	Oiso			National Route 134 – Kamakura, Enoshima	
Kanagawa	Oiso			Seishō Bypass	
Kanagawa	Oiso			Prefectural Route 63 – to Odawara-Atsugi Road, Isehara	
Kanagawa	Ninomiya			Prefectural Route 71 to Odawara-Atsugi Road / to Tomei Expressway – Hadano / Seisho Bypass	
Kanagawa	Odawara			Prefectural Route 709 – Matsuda, Nakai	
Kanagawa	Odawara			Seishō Bypass – Tachikara, Yokohama	Interchange
Kanagawa	Odawara			Prefectural Route 72 to Tomei Expressway – Matsuda / Seisho Bypass	
Kanagawa	Odawara			Prefectural Route 719 / Seisho Bypass – Yokohama	
Kanagawa	Odawara			Seishō Bypass – Odawara, Yokohama	Interchange
Kanagawa	Odawara			National Route 138 west / National Route 255 north – Matsuda, Odawara Station	Eastern end of unsigned National Route 138 concurrency
Kanagawa	Odawara			National Route 135 – Atami, Yugawara / Prefectural Route 73 – Odawara Station	
Kanagawa	Odawara			Seishō Bypass to Odawara-Atsugi Road / to Hakone Toll Road	Interchange
Kanagawa	Hakone			Hakone Bypass – Yugawara	
Kanagawa	Hakone			Prefectural Route 732 – Hatajuka	
Kanagawa	Hakone			National Route 138 – Gotenba, Sengokuhara	Western end of unsigned National Route 138 concurrency
Kanagawa	Hakone			Prefectural Route 723 – Gora	
Kanagawa	Hakone			Prefectural Route 734 – Kojiri, Owakudani	
Kanagawa	Hakone			Prefectural Route 75 – Gotenba, Sengokuhara	
Kanagawa	Hakone			Prefectural Route 732 – Odawara, Hatajuka	
Kanagawa	Hakone			Prefectural Route 75 to Hakone Toll Road – Yagawara	
Kanagawa	Hakone			National Route 1 (Hakone Toll Road) – Odawara	Interchange
Kanagawa	Hakone			Prefectural Route 20 – Atami / Ashinoko Skyline – Kojiri	
Shizuoka	Mishima			Shin-Tomei Expressway – to Tōmei Expressway	
Shizuoka	Mishima			Prefectural Route 22 – Central Mishima	
Shizuoka	Mishima			Prefectural Route 142	
Shizuoka	Mishima			National Route 136 – Shimoda, Izu City / Prefectural Route 21 – Susono	Interchange
Shizuoka	Mishima			Prefectural Route 140 / Prefectural Route 51 – Mishima Station	
Shizuoka	Mishima			Prefectural Route 144	
Shizuoka	Mishima			Prefectural Route 145	
Shizuoka	Mishima			Prefectural Route 380	Interchange
Shizuoka	Numazu			National Route 246 – to Tomei Expressway, Shin-Tomei Expressway Gotemba	
Shizuoka	Numazu			Prefectural Route 162 – Numazu Station / Prefectural Route 22	
Shizuoka	Numazu			Prefectural Route 164 – Katahama Station	
Shizuoka	Numazu			Prefectural Route 165 – Hara Station	
Shizuoka	Numazu			Prefectural Route 166	
Shizuoka	Fuji			Prefectural Route 167	
Shizuoka	Fuji			National Route 139 – Central Fuji, Tagonoura Port	Interchange
Shizuoka	Fuji			National Route 139 – Central Fuji, Tagonoura Port	
Shizuoka	Fuji			Prefectural Route 174 – Fujinomiya	
Shizuoka	Shizuoka			Fujikawa	Interchange
Shizuoka	Shizuoka			Kanbara	Interchange
Shizuoka	Shizuoka			National Route 1 (Seishin Bypass) – Okitsu Station / National Route 52 – Kofu, Minobu	Interchange
Shizuoka	Shizuoka			Prefectural Route 193	
Shizuoka	Shizuoka			Prefectural Route 338 to Seishin Bypass / to Tomei Expressway, Shin-Tomei Expressway / Miho, Shimizu Port	
Shizuoka	Shizuoka			National Route 149 – Miho, Shimizu Port / Prefectural Route 54 – Shimizu Station	
Shizuoka	Shizuoka			Prefectural Route 54 – to Tomei Expressway, Nuzamu / Prefectural Route 67 to Seishin Bypass – Hamamatsu	
Shizuoka	Shizuoka			Prefectural Route 197 – Miho, Shimizu Port	
Shizuoka	Shizuoka			Prefectural Route 354 – to Prefectural Route 384	
Shizuoka	Shizuoka			Prefectural Route 27	
Shizuoka	Shizuoka			National Route 362 – Kawanehon / Toro Ruins	
Shizuoka	Shizuoka			Prefectural Route 207 / Prefectural Route 366	
Shizuoka	Shizuoka			Prefectural Route 208	
Shizuoka	Shizuoka			National Route 1 (Seishin Bypass) – Numazu, Fuji	Interchange
Shizuoka	Shizuoka			Prefectural Route 208 (Utsunoya Pass)	
Shizuoka	Fujieda–Shizuoka border			Okabe Tunnel	
Shizuoka	Fujieda			Shin-Tōmei Expressway – Nagoya, Tokyo; Prefectural Route 81 east – to Tōmei Expressway, Yaizu, Okabe	Hirohata Interchange
Shizuoka	Fujieda			Prefectural Route 209 – Central Fujieda, Asahina	Interchange
Shizuoka	Fujieda			Prefectural Route 215 – Nishigata, Central Fujieda	Interchange
Shizuoka	Fujieda			Prefectural Route 32 – Central Fujieda, Setonoya	Interchange
Shizuoka	Shimada			National Route 1 (Fujieda Bypass) – Airport, Numazu, Shizuoka, Shimada Station	Interchange
Shizuoka	Shimada			Central Shimada	Interchange
Shizuoka	Shimada			Kawanehon	Interchange
Shizuoka	Shimada			National Route 473 – Kawanehon, Airport	Interchange
Shizuoka	Shimada			Makinohara First Tunnel	
Shizuoka	Shimada			Makinohara Second Tunnel	
Shizuoka	Shimada			Makinohara Third Tunnel	
Shizuoka	Shimada			National Route 1 (Nissaka Bypass) – Hamamatsu, Kakegawa	Interchange
Shizuoka	Shimada			Prefectural Route 381	
Shizuoka	Kakegawa			Sayononakayama Tunnel	
Shizuoka	Kakegawa			Prefectural Route 415	
Shizuoka	Kakegawa			National Route 1 (Nissaka Bypass) – Shizuoka	Interchange
Shizuoka	Kakegawa			Kotonomama Tunnel	
Shizuoka	Kakegawa			National Route 1 (Kakegawa Bypass) – Hamamatsu, Shizuoka, Fukuroi, Shizuoka	Interchange
Shizuoka	Kakegawa			Prefectural Route 39 – Kurami, Central Kakegawa	Interchange
Shizuoka	Kakegawa			Prefectural Route 40 – Mori, Central Kakegawa	Interchange
Shizuoka	Fukuroi			Prefectural Route 253 – Harakawa	
Shizuoka	Fukuroi			National Route 1 (Kakegawa Bypass) – Shizuoka, Shimada	Interchange; eastbound exit and westbound entrance
Shizuoka	Fukuroi			Prefectural Route 402 – Aino Station, ECOPA Stadium	
Shizuoka	Fukuroi			Prefectural Route 413 – Central Fukuroi	
Shizuoka	Fukuroi			Prefectural Route 61 to Tomei Expressway – Mori, Central Fukuroi	Interchange
Shizuoka	Fukuroi			Central Fukuroi	Interchange
Shizuoka	Iwata			National Route 1 (Iwata Bypass) – Nagoya, Hamamatsu	Interchange; westbound exit and eastbound entrance
Shizuoka	Iwata			Prefectural Route 86 – Tomei Expressway, Central Iwata, Fukude Fishing Port	Interchange
Shizuoka	Iwata			Prefectural Route 43 – Fukude, Central Iwata	
Shizuoka	Iwata			Prefectural Route 44 – Tenryu, Iwata Station	Interchange
Shizuoka	Iwata			National Route 1 (Iwata Bypass)	Interchange
Shizuoka	Iwata			Prefectural Route 262 – Central Iwata	Interchange
Shizuoka	Hamamatsu			Prefectural Route 261 – Hamakita	Interchange
Shizuoka	Hamamatsu			National Route 152 – Central Hamamatsu / Prefectural Route 65 to Tomei Expressway – Tenryu	Interchange
Shizuoka	Hamamatsu			Prefectural Route 313	
Shizuoka	Hamamatsu			National Route 150 – Central Hamamatsu	
Shizuoka	Hamamatsu			Prefectural Route 316 – Maisaka Station	
Shizuoka	Hamamatsu			National Route 150 to Enshuu-Ohashi Bridge – Omaezaki / Central Hamamatsu	
Shizuoka	Hamamatsu			Prefectural Route 317 – Central Hamamatsu	
Shizuoka	Hamamatsu			National Route 1 (Hamana Bypass) – Nagoya, Toyohashi	Interchange; eastbound exit and westbound entrance
Shizuoka	Hamamatsu			National Route 257 – Tenryu, Hamamatsu Station	
Shizuoka	Hamamatsu			Prefectural Route 65	
Shizuoka	Hamamatsu			Prefectural Route 49 – Toyohashi, Hosoe	
Shizuoka	Hamamatsu			Prefectural Route 49	
Shizuoka	Kosai			Prefectural Route 323 – Kanzanji	
Shizuoka	Kosai			National Route 301 – Mikkabi, Central Kosai	
Shizuoka	Kosai			National Route 42 – Toyohashi, Kosai	
Shizuoka	Kosai			National Route 1 (Hamana Bypass) – Shizuoka, Hamamatsu	Interchange
Shizuoka	Kosai			National Route 42 – Central Kosai	
Shizuoka	Kosai			Shiomi Tunnel	
Aichi	Toyohashi			Prefectural Route 402	
Aichi	Toyohashi			Prefectural Route 404	
Aichi	Toyohashi			Prefectural Route 3 / Prefectural Route 386	
Aichi	Toyohashi			Prefectural Route 31	
Aichi	Toyohashi			Prefectural Route 502	
Aichi	Toyohashi			Prefectural Route 69	
Aichi	Toyohashi			National Route 23 – Gamgagori / National Route 255 – Iragomisaki	
Aichi	Toyohashi			Prefectural Route 382 – Toyohashi Station / Prefectural Route 460 to Tomei Expressway – Toyokawa	
Aichi	Toyokawa			National Route 151 / National Route 247	
Aichi	Toyokawa			Prefectural Route 495	
Aichi	Toyokawa			Prefectural Route 373	
Aichi	Toyokawa			Prefectural Route 21	
Aichi	Toyokawa			Prefectural Route 31	
Aichi	Toyokawa			Prefectural Route 374	
Aichi	Toyokawa			Prefectural Route 5 / Prefectural Route 368	
Aichi	Toyokawa			Prefectural Route 374	
Aichi	Okazaki			National Route 473	East end of National Route 473 concurrency
Aichi	Okazaki			National Route 473	West end of National Route 473 concurrency
Aichi	Okazaki			Prefectural Route 329	
Aichi	Okazaki			Prefectural Route 48	
Aichi	Okazaki			Prefectural Route 35	
Aichi	Okazaki			Tomei Expressway – Okazaki	Interchange
Aichi	Okazaki			Prefectural Route 477 – Higashi-Okazaki Station	
Aichi	Okazaki			Prefectural Route 39 – Asuke / Prefectural Route 483 – Kota	
Aichi	Okazaki			National Route 248 – Toyota, Gamagori	
Aichi	Okazaki			Prefectural Route 290	
Aichi	Okazaki			Prefectural Route 47 – Central Anjo	
Aichi	Okazaki			Prefectural Route 26 – Nishio, Toyota	
Aichi	Anjo			Prefectural Route 76 – Central Anjo, Toyota	
Aichi	Anjo			Prefectural Route 12 – Toyota, Mikawa-Anjo Station	
Aichi	Chiryu			Kinuura-Toyota Road – Toyota, Takahama	Interchange
Aichi	Chiryu			Prefectural Route 51	
Aichi	Chiryu			National Route 155 – to Isewangan Expressway, Tomei Expressway	Interchange
Aichi	Chiryu			Prefectural Route 54	
Aichi	Chiryu			Prefectural Route 289	
Aichi	Toyoake			National Route 23 / Nagoya Expressway, to Isewangan Expressway – Tsu, Yokkaichi	Interchange; westbound exit and eastbound entrance
Aichi	Toyoake			Prefectural Route 57 – Seto, Tojo	Interchange; southbound traffic access only; no access to Prefectural Route 57 south
Aichi	Nagoya			Prefectural Route 222	
Aichi	Nagoya			Prefectural Route 243 – Obu / Arimatsu Station	
Aichi	Nagoya			National Route 302 (Nagoya Second Belt Highway) – to Mei-Nikan Expressway, Isewangan Expressway, National Route 19, National Route 23, National Route 153, National Route 247, Tajimi, Gamagōri, Toyota, Tokoname, Kamiyashiro	
Aichi	Nagoya			Prefectural Route 50	
Aichi	Nagoya			Prefectural Route 59 – to Central Japan Airport, Isewangan Expressway, National Route 153, Nagoya Interchange, Tōkai	
Aichi	Nagoya			Airport Route – to National Route 41, Komaki, Tsuruma Park; Prefectural Route 222 – National Highway Office	
Aichi	Nagoya			Prefectural Route 271	
Aichi	Nagoya			National Route 19 north / National Route 22 north – Gifu, Tajimi; National Route 247 south – Handa, Tokai	
Aichi	Nagoya			Nagoya Expressway – Rokuban, Nagoya Station / Nagoya Port	Interchange
Aichi	Nagoya			Prefectural Route 107 – Yaguma-dori / Kinjo Pier	
Aichi	Nagoya			Prefectural Route 70	
Aichi	Nagoya			Prefectural Route 106	
Aichi	Nagoya			National Route 302 (Nagoya Second Belt Highway) – to Isewangan Expressway, Mei-Nikan Expressway, Nagoya Expressway, National Route 22, National Route 23, Gifu, Tobishima	Interchange
Aichi	Kanie			Prefectural Route 103 – Central Kanie	
Aichi	Kanie			Prefectural Route 66 south Prefectural Route 114 north	
Aichi	Kanie			Prefectural Route 65 – to Higashi-Meihan Expressway; Prefectural Route 66 south – to Isewangan Expressway, National Route 23 Ichinomiya	Interchange
Aichi	Kanie			Prefectural Route 462 south	Eastern end of Aichi Prefecture Route 462 concurrency
Aichi	Aisai			Prefectural Route 462 north – Eiwa Station	Western end of Aichi Prefecture Route 462 concurrency
Aichi	Yatomi			Prefectural Route 109 – Aisai	
Aichi	Yatomi			National Route 155 north (Yatomi Bypass) – to Higashi-Meihan Expressway, Ichinomiya, Tsushima; Prefectural Route 105 south	Eastern end of Aichi Prefecture Route 105 concurrency
Aichi	Yatomi			Prefectural Route 29 / Prefectural Route 105 north	Western end of Aichi Prefecture Route 105 concurrency
Aichi	Yatomi			Prefectural Route 108	
Aichi	Yatomi			Prefectural Route 458 north – to Higashi-Meihan Expressway, Ichinomiya, Tsushima	
Mie–Aichi border			Owari Bridge (east span)		
Mie	Kuwana			Prefectural Route 7 – to Isewangan Expressway, Higashi-Meihan Expressway, National Route 23, Nagashima Spa, Gifu	
Mie	Kuwana			Prefectural Route 518 west	
Mie	Kuwana			Prefectural Route 106 north – Kaizu	
Mie	Kuwana			Owari Bridge (west span)	
Mie	Kuwana			Prefectural Route 613 south	
Mie	Kuwana			Prefectural Route 142 – to National Route 258, Tōin	
Mie	Kuwana			Prefectural Route 504 east – Kuwana Post Office	
Mie	Kuwana			National Route 258 – to National Route 23, Isewangan Expressway, Higashi-Meihan Expressway, Ogaki	Interchange
Mie	Asahi			Prefectural Route 143	
Mie	Asahi			Prefectural Route 66	
Mie	Asahi			National Route 1 (Hokusei Bypass) – to Isewangan Expressway, Higashi-Meihan Expressway, National Route 23, Kawagoe	Interchange
Mie	Kawagoe			Prefectural Route 26 – Tōin	
Mie	Kawagoe			Prefectural Route 401	
Mie	Kawagoe			Prefectural Route 8	
Mie	Kawagoe			Prefectural Route 64 to Higashi-Meihan Expressway / Prefectural Route 401 – Kasumigaura	
Mie	Kawagoe			Prefectural Route 9	
Mie	Yokkaichi			National Route 365 – Seigahara, Yunoyamaonsen	
Mie	Yokkaichi			National Route 164 – Yokkaichi Port	
Mie	Yokkaichi			Prefectural Route 44 / Prefectural Route 629	
Mie	Yokkaichi			National Route 25 – to National Route 23, Shiohama, Tsu, Suzuka	
Mie	Yokkaichi			Prefectural Route 631	
Mie	Yokkaichi			Prefectural Route 407	
Mie	Yokkaichi			Prefectural Route 8 – Sasagawa, Central Suzuka / Kokubu	
Mie	Suzuka			Prefectural Route 115 – Suzawa, Central Suzuka	
Mie	Suzuka			Prefectural Route 27 to Higashi-Meihan Expressway – Central Suzuka	
Mie	Suzuka			Prefectural Route 643 – to National Route 23, Suzuka Circuit	
Mie	Suzuka			Prefectural Route 637 / Central Suzuka, Suzuka Circuit	Interchange
Mie	Suzuka			Prefectural Route 641	
Mie	Suzuka			Prefectural Route 78	
Mie	Kameyama			National Route 306 / Prefectural Route 648	
Mie	Kameyama			To Prefectural Route 647	Interchange
Mie	Kameyama			Prefectural Route 647	Interchange
Mie	Kameyama			National Route 25 – to Shin-Meishin Expressway, Higashi-Meihan Expressway, Ise Expressway, Osaka	Interchange
Mie	Kameyama			Prefectural Route 11	
Mie	Kameyama			National Route 25 – Iga	
Shiga–Mie border			Shizuka–Toge Tunnel		
Shiga	Koka			Prefectural Route 607	
Shiga	Koka			Prefectural Route 129	
Shiga	Koka			Prefectural Route 9	
Shiga	Koka			Prefectural Route 24	
Shiga	Koka			Prefectural Route 24 / Prefectural Route 41	
Shiga	Koka			Prefectural Route 183	
Shiga	Koka			National Route 307	Interchange
Shiga	Koka			National Route 307	Interchange; eastbound exit and westbound entrance
Shiga	Koka			Prefectural Route 549	
Shiga	Koka			Prefectural Route 537	
Shiga	Koka			Prefectural Route 121 / Prefectural Route 164	
Shiga	Koka			Prefectural Route 128	
Shiga	Koka			Prefectural Route 178	
Shiga	Konan			National Route 1 (Konan Bypass)	
Shiga	Konan			Prefectural Route 22 / Prefectural Route 113	
Shiga	Konan			National Route 1 (Konan Bypass)	
Shiga	Konan			Prefectural Route 11	
Shiga	Konan			Prefectural Route 12 / Prefectural Route 145	
Shiga	Ritto–Konan border			Meishin Expressway	Interchange
Shiga	Ritto			National Route 8 – Tsuruga, Omihachiman	Eastern end of National Route 8 concurrency; interchange
Shiga	Ritto			Prefectural Route 55 – Shigaraki	
Shiga	Ritto			Prefectural Route 31 – Hamakaido / Shigaraki	
Shiga	Ritto			Prefectural Route 2 – Moriyama	
Shiga	Kusatsu–Ritto border			Prefectural Route 142	
Shiga	Kusatsu			Prefectural Route 116 / Prefectural Route 143	
Shiga	Kusatsu			National Route 1 west (Keiji Bypass) – to Osaka, Meishin Expressway, Shin-Meishin Expressway	
Shiga	Kusatsu			Prefectural Route 28	
Shiga	Kusatsu			Prefectural Route 43 – to Keiji Bypass, Shigaraki	
Shiga	Kusatsu			Prefectural Route 26	
Shiga	Kusatsu			National Route 422 south – Uji; Prefectural Route 102 north (Kogan Road)	
Shiga	Kusatsu			Prefectural Route 781	
Shiga	Kusatsu			Prefectural Route 56 south – to Meishin Expressway, Central Ōtsu, Biwako Hall, Ōtsu Station, Shiga Prefecture Office	Interchange
Shiga	Kusatsu			National Route 161 north (Nishi-Otsu Bypass) – Tsuruga, Takashima	
Kyoto	Kyoto			Meishin Expressway – Osaka, Nagoya; Prefectural Route 143 west – Okazaki	Kyoto-higashi Interchange (E1 exit 32)
Kyoto	Kyoto			Prefectural Route 35 – Keage, Shinomiza	
Kyoto	Kyoto			Prefectural Route 117 – Yamashinaekimaen, Uji, Nara	
Kyoto	Kyoto			Higashiyama Tunnel	
Kyoto	Kyoto			Prefectural Route 116 (Shibutani Road)	
Kyoto	Kyoto			Prefectural Route 143 – Nara	
Kyoto	Kyoto			Prefectural Route 32 – Kyokawaramachi, Shimongo	
Kyoto	Kyoto			National Route 8 ends / National Route 9 ends National Route 24 south – Kyoto Station; National Route 367 north – Ohara	Western end of National Route 8 concurrency, eastern end of National Route 9 concurrency
Kyoto	Kyoto			National Route 9 west – to Kyoto Jūkan Expressway, Fukuchiyama, Nishiojigojo; Prefectural Route 38 north – Kamigamo	Western end of National Route 9 concurrency
Kyoto	Kyoto			Prefectural Route 113 – to Kyoto Jūkan Expressway, Higashiyama, Nishioji	
Kyoto	Kyoto			Prefectural Route 143 east – to National Route 24, Nara	
Kyoto	Kyoto			Prefectural Route 114 – Shichijo-omiya	
Kyoto	Kyoto			National Route 171 – Kobe, Nishiojigojo	
Kyoto	Kyoto			Prefectural Route 201	
Kyoto	Kyoto			Meishin Expressway – Osaka, Nagoya	Kyoto-minami Interchange (E1 exit 33-1)
Kyoto	Kyoto			Prefectural Route 202 – Kogabashi	
Kyoto	Kyoto			Prefectural Route 13 – Takedakaido / Prefectural Route 35 – Yodo	
Kyoto	Kyoto			Prefectural Route 188 – Kongetsukyo, Nagokakyo	
Kyoto	Kyoto			Prefectural Route 124	
Kyoto	Kyoto			National Route 478 – to Keiji Bypass, Uji, Oyamazaki	
Kyoto	Kyoto			Prefectural Route 81 – to National Route 24, Uji, Yodo	
Kyoto	Kyoto			Prefectural Route 15 – Uji, Yodo	
Kyoto	Yawata			Prefectural Route 22 – Uji, Yodo	
Kyoto	Yawata			Prefectural Route 281 – Central Yawata	
Kyoto	Yawata			Prefectural Route 736 – Kyotanabe / Central Yawata	
Kyoto	Yawata			Prefectural Route 251 – Kyotanabe / Prefectural Route 735 – Central Yawata	
Kyoto	Yawata			Prefectural Route 735 – Nagao	
Kyoto	Yawata			Prefectural Route 284 – Kyotanabe, Central Yawata	
Osaka	Hirakata			Prefectural Route 735	
Osaka	Hirakata			Prefectural Route 144 – Nagao, Central Hirakata	
Osaka	Hirakata			Prefectural Route 18 – Makino	
Osaka	Hirakata			National Route 307 – Kyotanabe / Prefectural Route 139 – Central Hirataka	
Osaka	Hirakata			National Route 168 – Oji / Prefectural Route 20	
Osaka	Hirakata			National Route 170 – Takatsuki, Koridachi	Interchange eastbound; at-grade intersection westbound; east end of National Route 170 concurrency
Osaka	Hirakata			National Route 170 – Kawachinagano, Neyagawa, Central Hirataka	Interchange westbound; at-grade intersection eastbound; west end of National Route 170 concurrency
Osaka	Hirakata			National Route 120 – Kawachinagano, Neyagawa	
Osaka	Hirakata			Prefectural Route 13	
Osaka	Neyagawa			Prefectural Route 148 – Kadono / Prefectural Route 149	
Osaka	Neyagawa			Prefectural Route 19	
Osaka	Neyagawa			Prefectural Route 15 – Settsu	
Osaka	Moriguchi			Prefectural Route 155 – to Hanshin Expressway Moriguchi Route	
Osaka	Moriguchi			Prefectural Route 2 – to Dainikahan Expressway, Sakai / Prefectural Route 13 – Neyagawa	
Osaka	Osaka			Prefectural Route 155 – Yoigumo / Prefectural Route 158 – Kadoma	
Osaka	Osaka			National Route 163 – Kizugawa City, Kahoma / Miyakojimahondori	
Osaka	Osaka			Prefectural Route 8 – Nara, Daito	
Osaka	Osaka			National Route 25 – Imazato	
Osaka	Osaka			Sakuranomiya Bridge	
Osaka	Osaka			Prefectural Route 30 – Tennoji Station / Hinokuchicho	
Osaka	Osaka			Hanshin Expressway Loop Route – Moriguchi	
Osaka	Osaka			National Route 423 – to National Route 25, Namba, Shin-Osaka Station	
Osaka	Osaka			National Route 2 west – Kobe, Nodahanshin; National Route 25 – Namba, Yodoyabashi, Toyonaka, Osaka Station	Western terminus of National Route 1; highway continues west as National Route 2
1.000 mi = 1.609 km; 1.000 km = 0.621 mi: Concurrency terminus; Incomplete access; Route transition

== See also ==
- Gokishichidō, the ancient highways of Japan

== Gallery ==
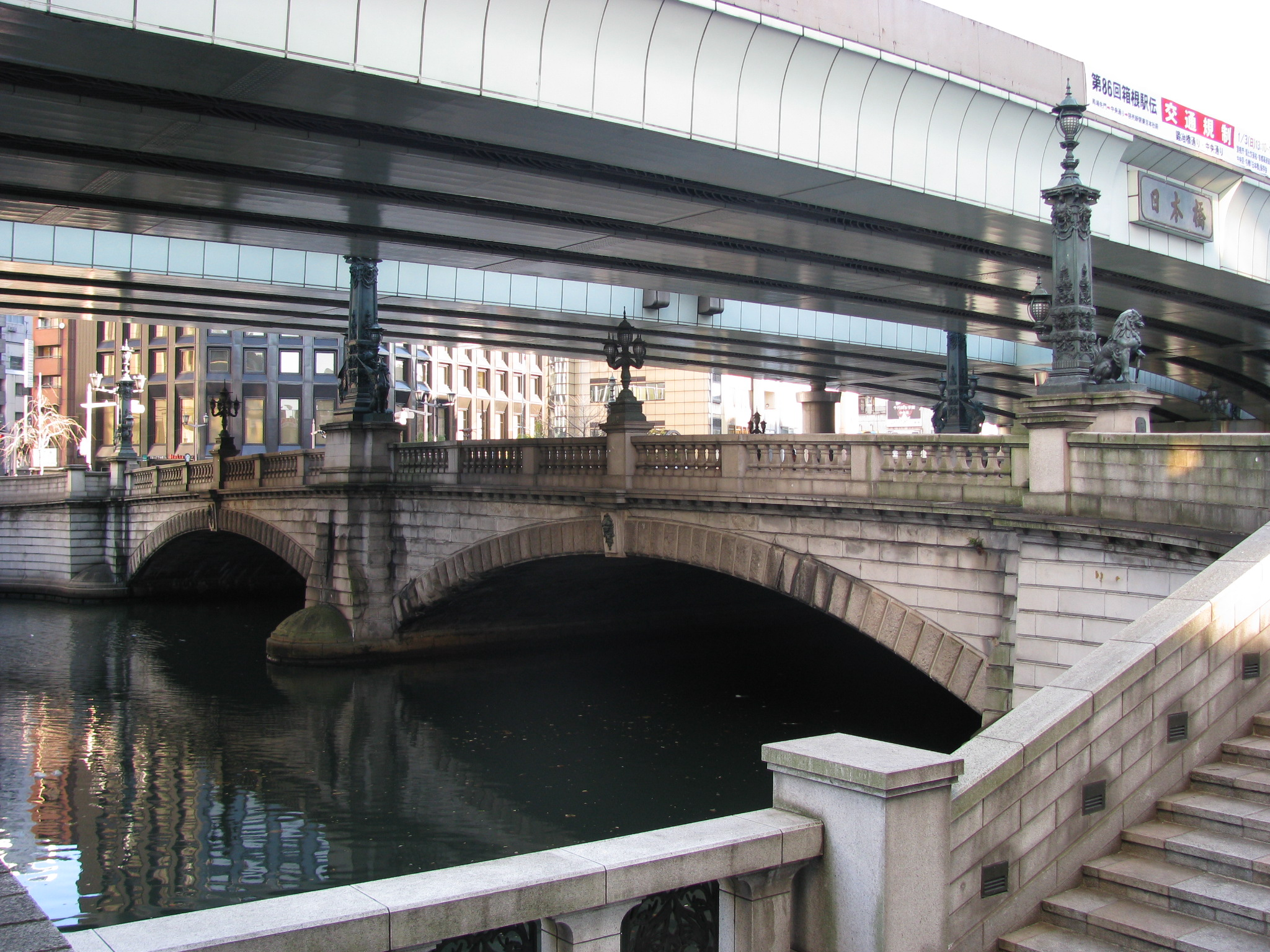
Nihonbashi, Tokyo terminus

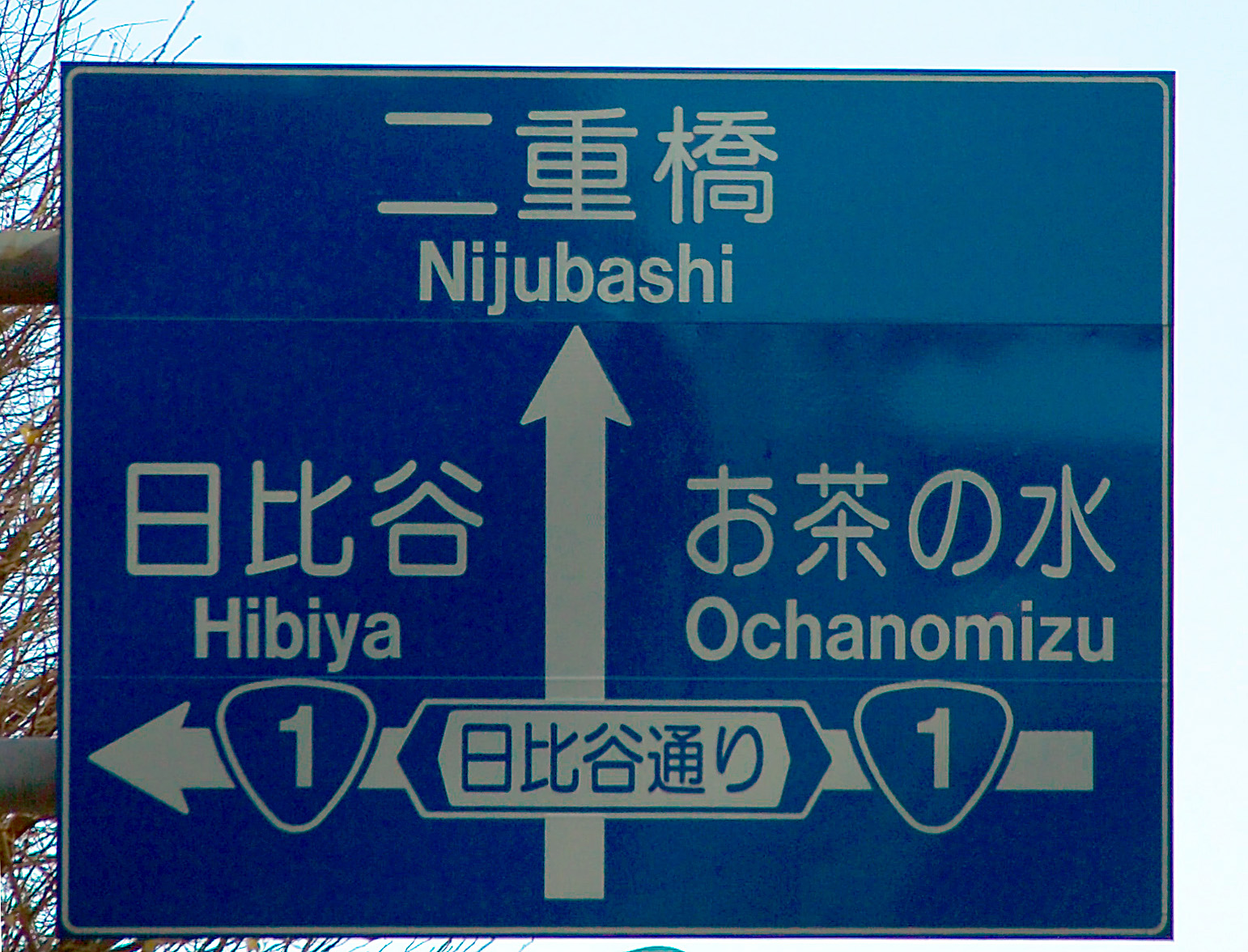
Route 1 passes in front of the Imperial Palace in Tokyo.

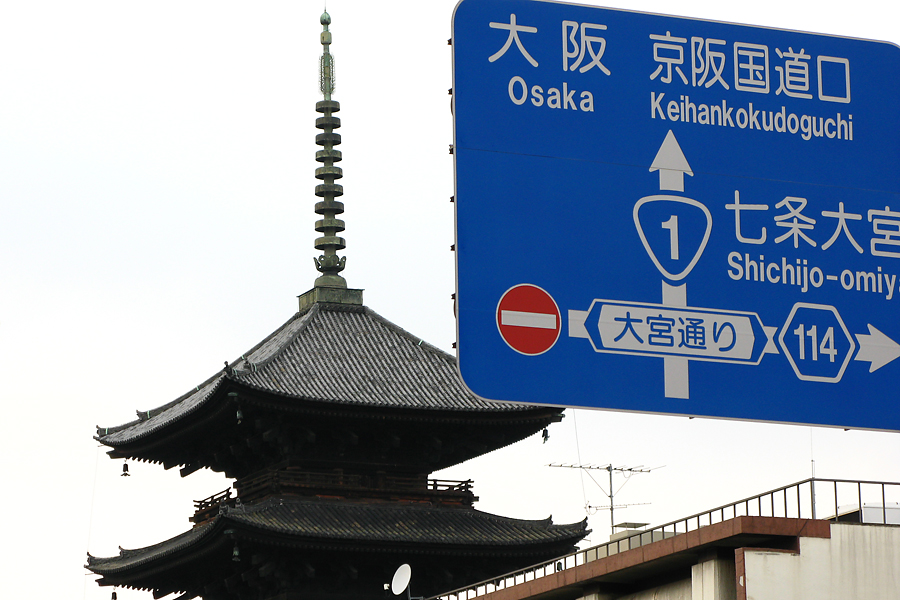
In Kyoto, Route 1 passes in front of Tō-ji.

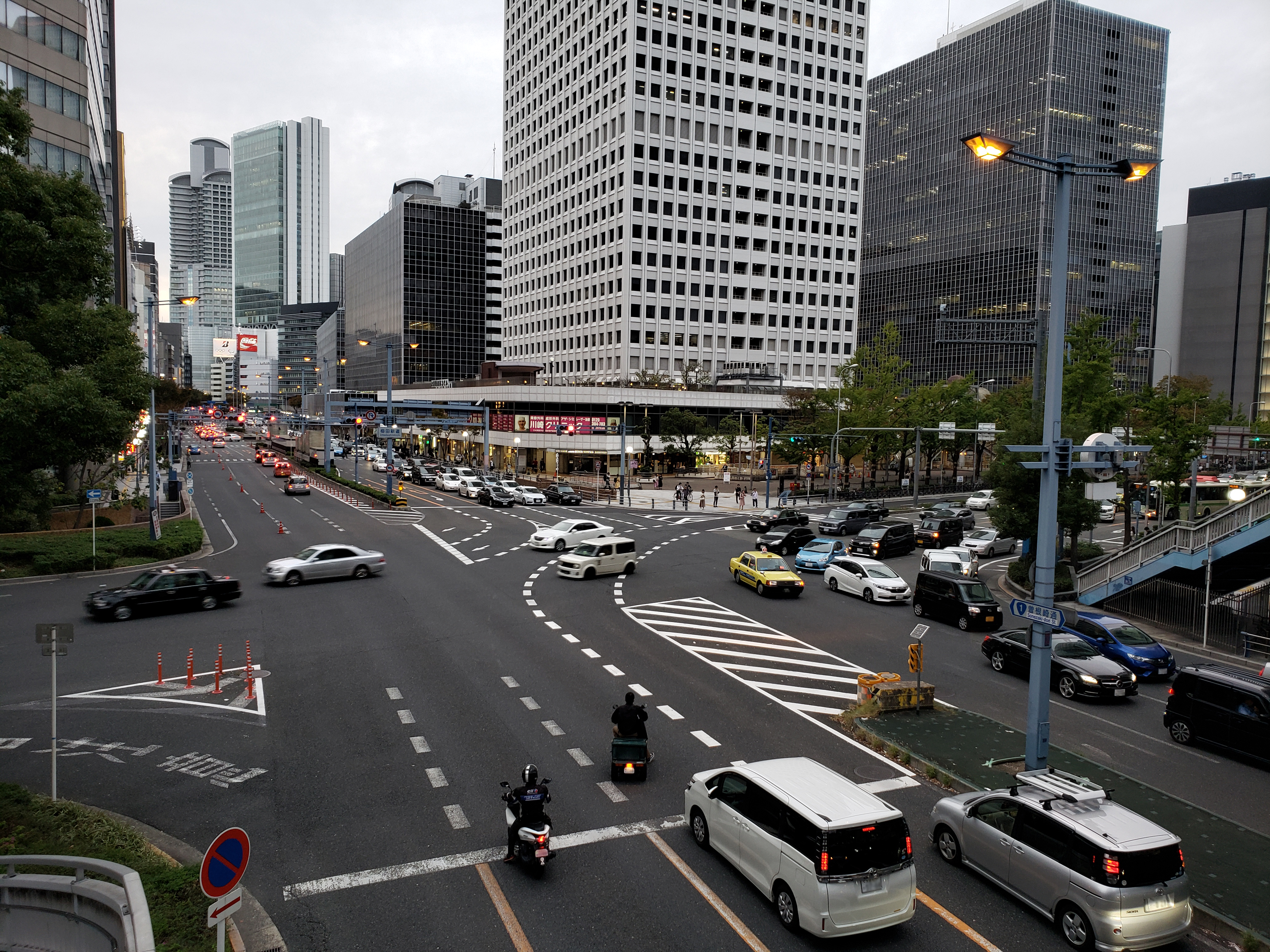
Western terminus of Route 1 in Umeda

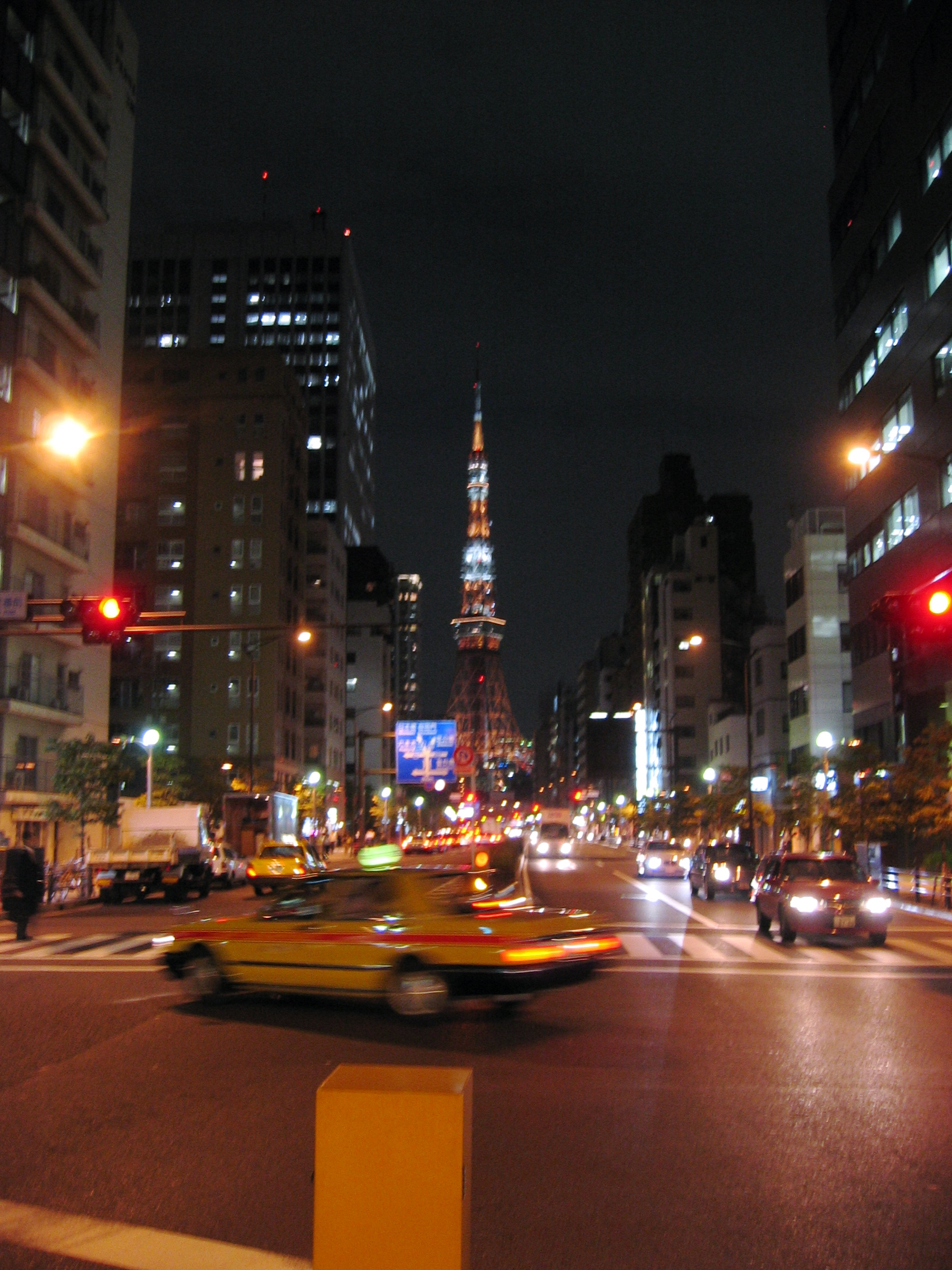
Route 1 heading through Shiba towards Tokyo Tower
