= Japan National Route 257 =

Road in Japan

National Route 257
- 国道257号
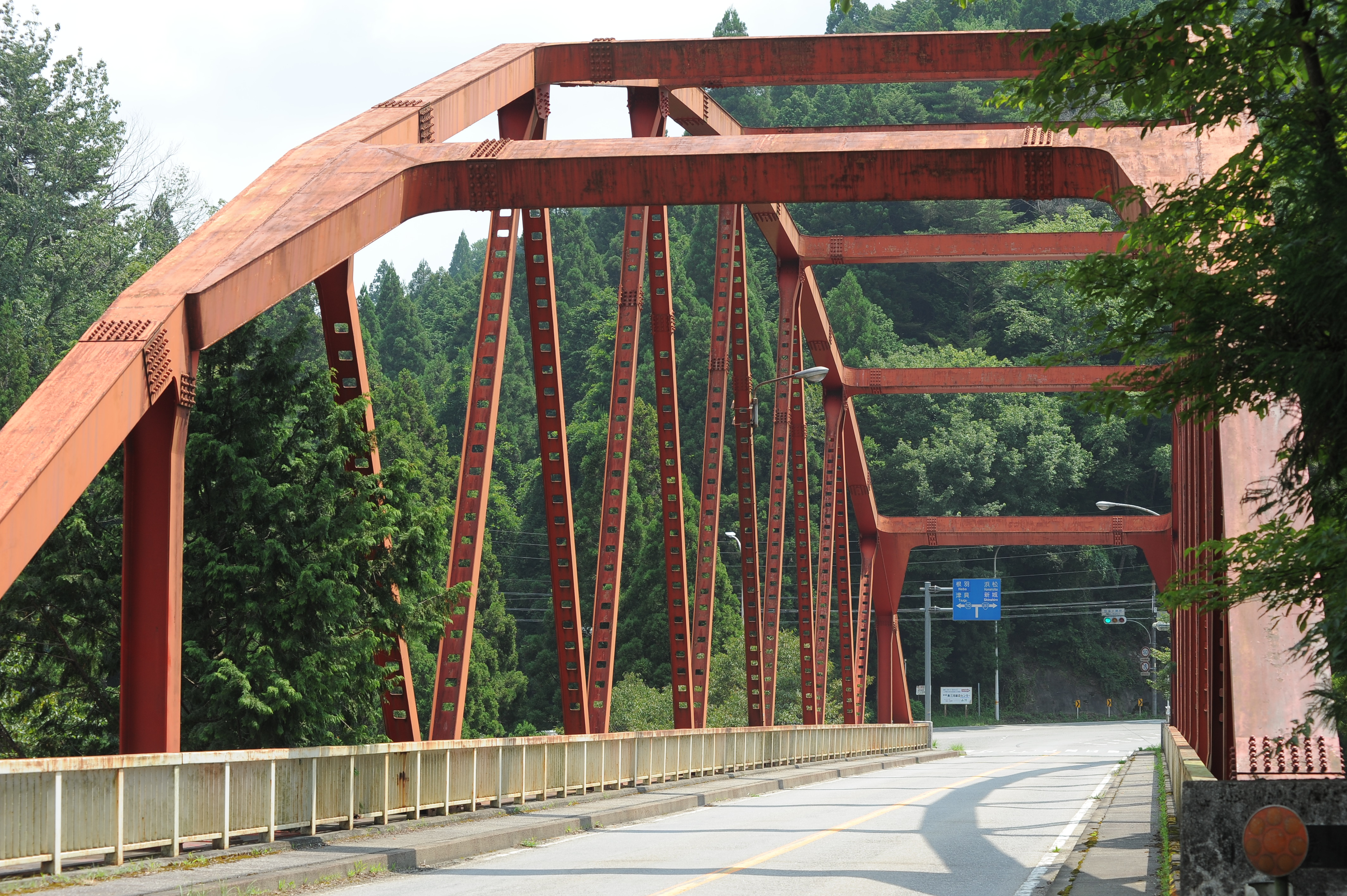

Route information
- Length: 241.6 km (150.1 mi)
- Existed: 1 April 1963–present

Major junctions
- North end: National Route 158 near Takayama, Gifu
- South end: National Route 1 in Chūō-ku, Hamamatsu

Location
- Country: Japan

Highway system
- National highways of Japan; Expressways of Japan
← National Route 256	→ National Route 258

National Route 257 is a national highway of Japan connecting Chūō-ku, Hamamatsu and Takayama, Gifu in Japan, with a total length of 241.6 km (150.1 mi).

== Route description ==
A section of National Route 257 in the city of Toyota in Aichi Prefecture is a musical road.
