= Japan National Route 256 =

National highway in Japan

National Route 256
- 国道256号
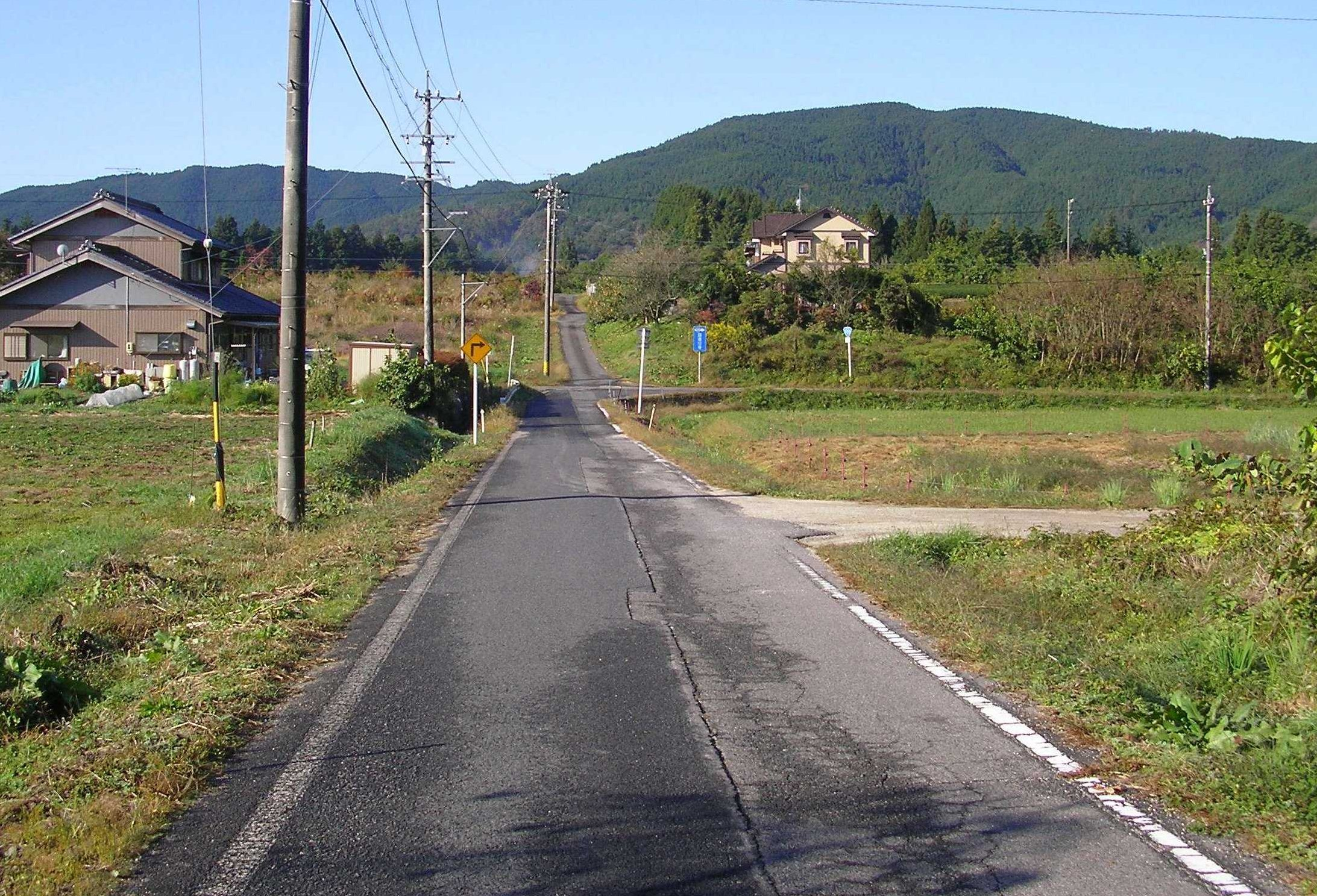

Route information
- Length: 243.4 km (151.2 mi)

Location
- Country: Japan

Highway system
- National highways of Japan; Expressways of Japan
← National Route 255	→ National Route 257

National Route 256 is a national highway of Japan connecting Gifu and Iida, Nagano in Japan, with a total length of 243.4 km (151.2 mi).
