= Japan National Route 164 =

National highway in Japan

National Route 164
- 国道164号

Route information
- Length: 3 km (1.9 mi)
- Existed: 18 May 1953–present

Major junctions
- South end: Port of Yokkaichi
- National Route 23
- North end: National Route 1 in Suwachō, Yokkaichi, Mie

Location
- Country: Japan

Highway system
- National highways of Japan; Expressways of Japan
← National Route 163	→ National Route 165

National Route 164 is a national highway of Japan connecting Port of Yokkaichi and Suwachō, Yokkaichi, Mie in Japan, with a total length of 3 km (1.86 mi).

== History ==
National Route 164 was established by the Cabinet of Japan in 1953.
