= Seishō Bypass =

Road in Kanagawa Prefecture, Japan

Seishō Bypass
- 西湘バイパス

Route information
- Length: 14.5 km 1.8 km (Ishibashi Branch Route) (9.0 mi) Main Route
- Existed: 1967–present

Major junctions
- From: Seishō-Ninomiya Interchange in Ninomiya, Kanagawa; Seishō Bypass (toll-free section); National Route 1
- To: Hakoneguchi Interchange in Odawara, Kanagawa; Odawara-Hakone Road; National Route 1 Ishibashi Interchange in Odawara, Kanagawa; National Route 135

Location
- Country: Japan

Highway system
- National highways of Japan; Expressways of Japan

The Seishō Bypass (西湘バイパス, Seishō Baipasu) (lit. West Shōnan Bypass) is a toll road in Kanagawa Prefecture, Japan. It is owned and managed by Central Nippon Expressway Company.

== Overview ==
Officially the road is designated as a bypass for National Route 1. It is also classified as a road for motor vehicles only (自動車専用道路, Jidōsha Senyō Dōro) and access is controlled with interchanges and junctions in a similar manner to national expressways in Japan.

The road closely follows the coastline of Sagami Bay, facilitating access between the Tokyo urban area and the city of Odawara in western Kanagawa Prefecture. At the eastern terminus the Seishō Bypass continues as a toll-free road managed by the Ministry of Land, Infrastructure and Transport. In the west, the main route terminates near the resort town of Hakone, while a short branch route terminates at an intersection with National Route 135 which leads to the resort town of Atami and the Izu Peninsula.

The first section of the road was opened to traffic in 1967 and the entire route was completed in 1972. The main route has 4 lanes of traffic and the Ishibashi branch route has 2 lanes.

There are three toll collection points along the road. On the main route at the Tachibana Toll Plaza, a toll of 250 yen is collected from regular passenger cars. At Kōzu Interchange these vehicles are charged 150 yen at the eastbound exit and westbound entrance. At Ishibashi Interchange 200 yen is collected. Electronic Toll Collection (ETC) is accepted for payment, however no discount programs are in effect.

In September 2007 Typhoon Fitow caused extensive damage to the road, reducing some sections to two lanes of traffic and forcing the complete closure of other sections. The entire road was restored to full capacity on April 25, 2008.

== Interchange list ==
- IC - interchange, JCT - junction, PA - parking area, TB - toll gate

=== Main Route ===
Name	Connections	Dist. from Origin	Notes	Location (all in Kanagawa)
Through to Seishō Bypass (toll-free section)
Seishō-Ninomiya IC	National Route 1	0.0		Ninomiya
Tachibana IC/ Tachibana TB/ Seishō PA	National Route 1	2.8	IC: Ninomiya-bound entrance and exit only PA: Ninomiya-bound only	Odawara
Kōzu IC/ Seishō PA	National Route 1 Pref. Route 72 (Matsuda Kōzu Route)	5.5	PA: Hakone-bound only	Odawara
Sakawa IC	National Route 1	8.0	Ninomiya-bound entrance only	Odawara
Odawara IC	National Route 1	9.6	Ninomiya-bound entrance, Hakone-bound exit only	Odawara
Hayakawa JCT	Ishibashi Branch Route	11.6		Odawara
Hayakawa IC		12.2	Ninomiya-bound entrance, Hakone-bound exit only	Odawara
	Hakone Turnpike	↓	Ninomiya-bound entrance, Hakone-bound exit only	Odawara
Odawara-nishi IC	Odawara-Atsugi Road	13.8	Local road access via Odawara-Atsugi Road only	Odawara
Hakoneguchi IC	National Route 1	14.5		Odawara
Through to Odawara-Hakone Road

=== Ishibashi Branch Route ===
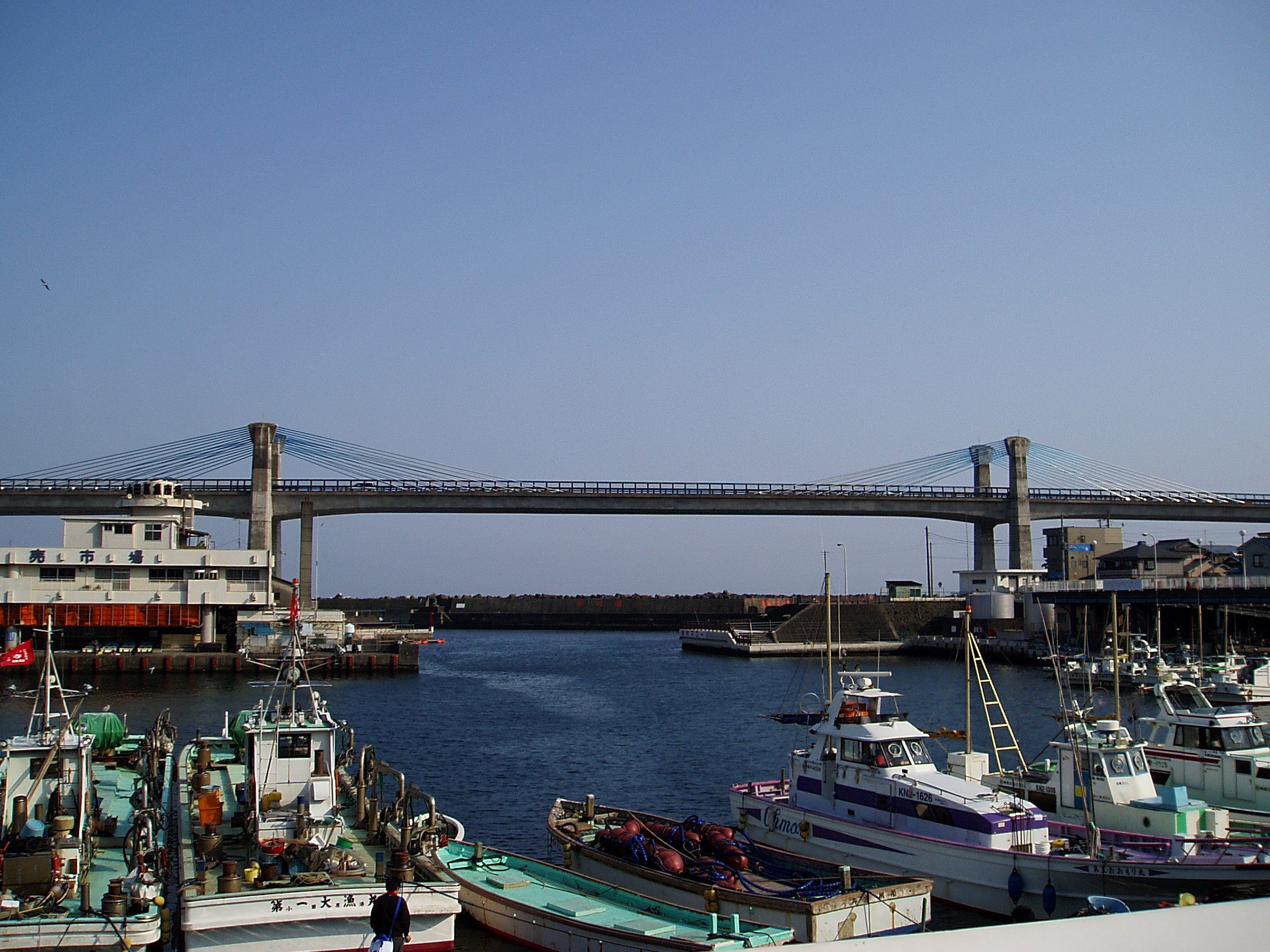
Odawara Blue Way Bridge

Name	Connections	Dist. from Origin	Notes	Location (all in Kanagawa)
Hayakawa JCT	Main Route	11.6		Odawara
Odawara Blue Way Bridge		↓		Odawara
Ishibashi IC	National Route 135	13.4		Odawara
