= Ninomiya, Kanagawa =

Ninomiya 二宮町
- Town
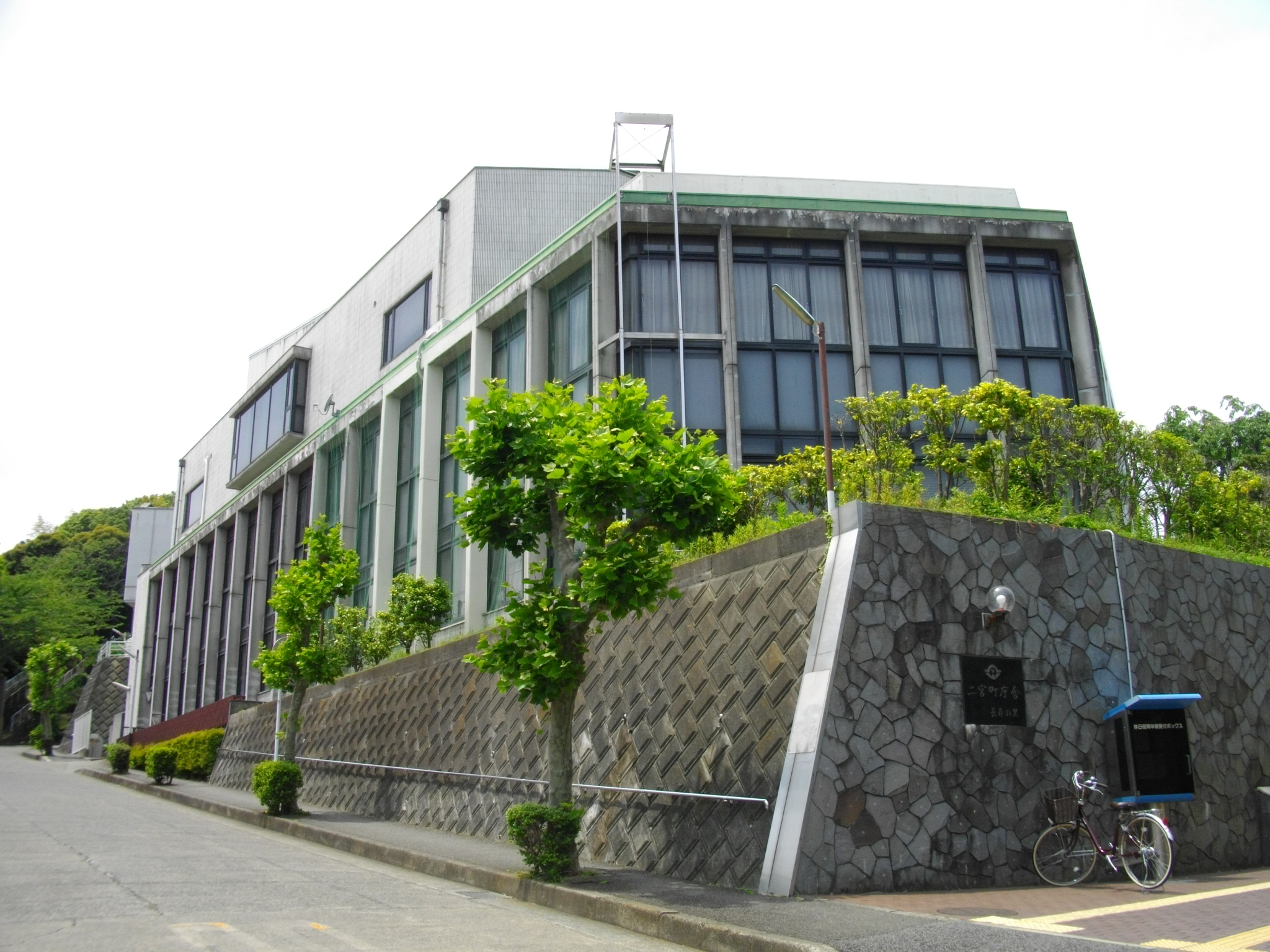
- Ninomiya Town Hall

- Flag Seal

- Location of Ninomiya in Kanagawa Prefecture

- Coordinates: 35°17′58.3″N 139°15′19.9″E
- Country: Japan
- Region: Kantō
- Prefecture: Kanagawa
- District: Naka

Area
  - Total: 9.08 km^{2} (3.51 sq mi)

Population (April 2021)
  - Total: 27,334
  - Density: 3,010/km^{2} (7,800/sq mi)
- Time zone: UTC+9 (Japan Standard Time)
- Symbols
  - Tree: Camellia
  - Flower: Canna
  - Bird: Varied tit
- Phone number: 0463-71-3311
- Address: 961 Ninomiya, Ninomiya-machi, Naga-gun, Kanagawa-ken 259-0196
- Website: Official website

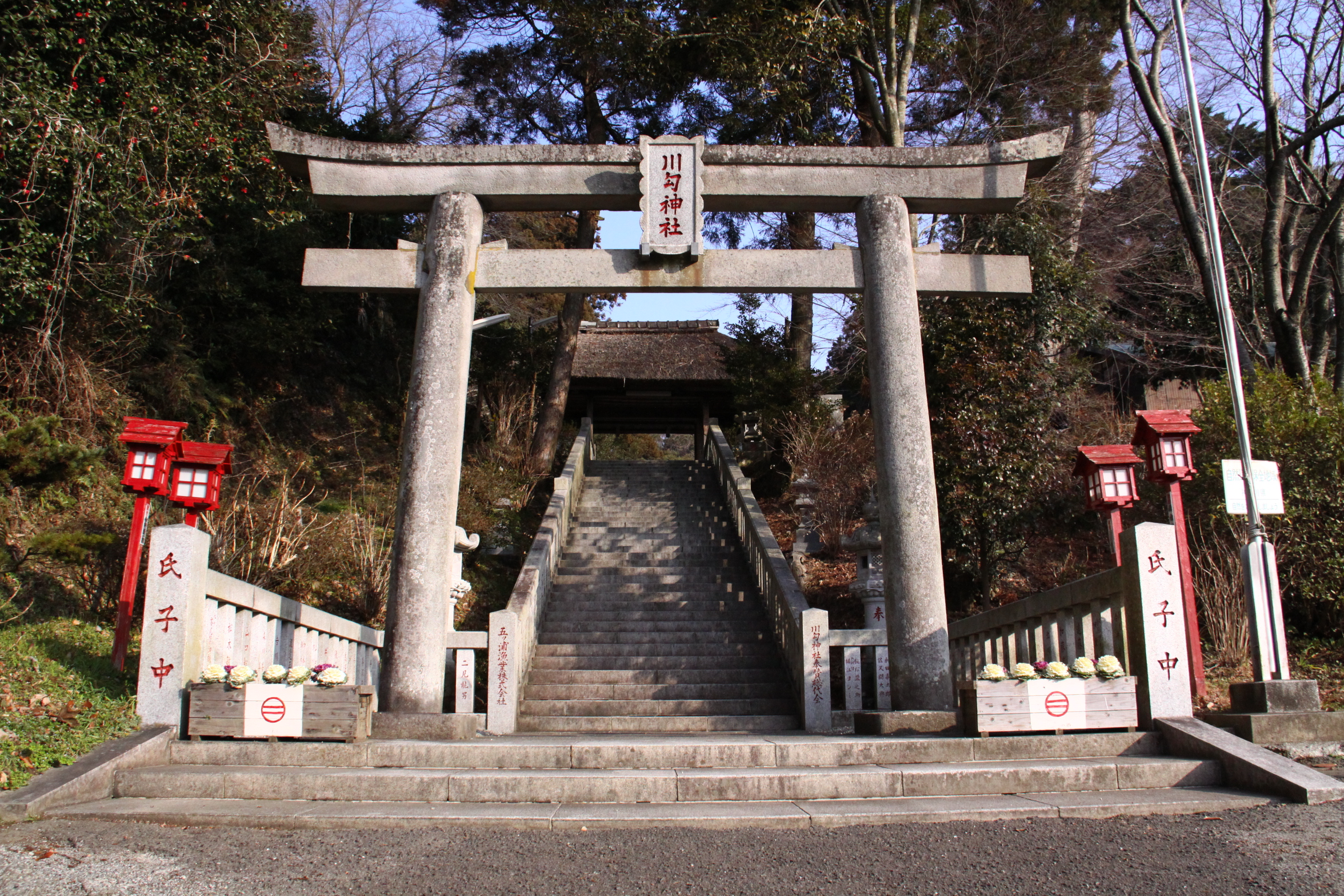
Kawawa Jinja, after which Ninomiya is named

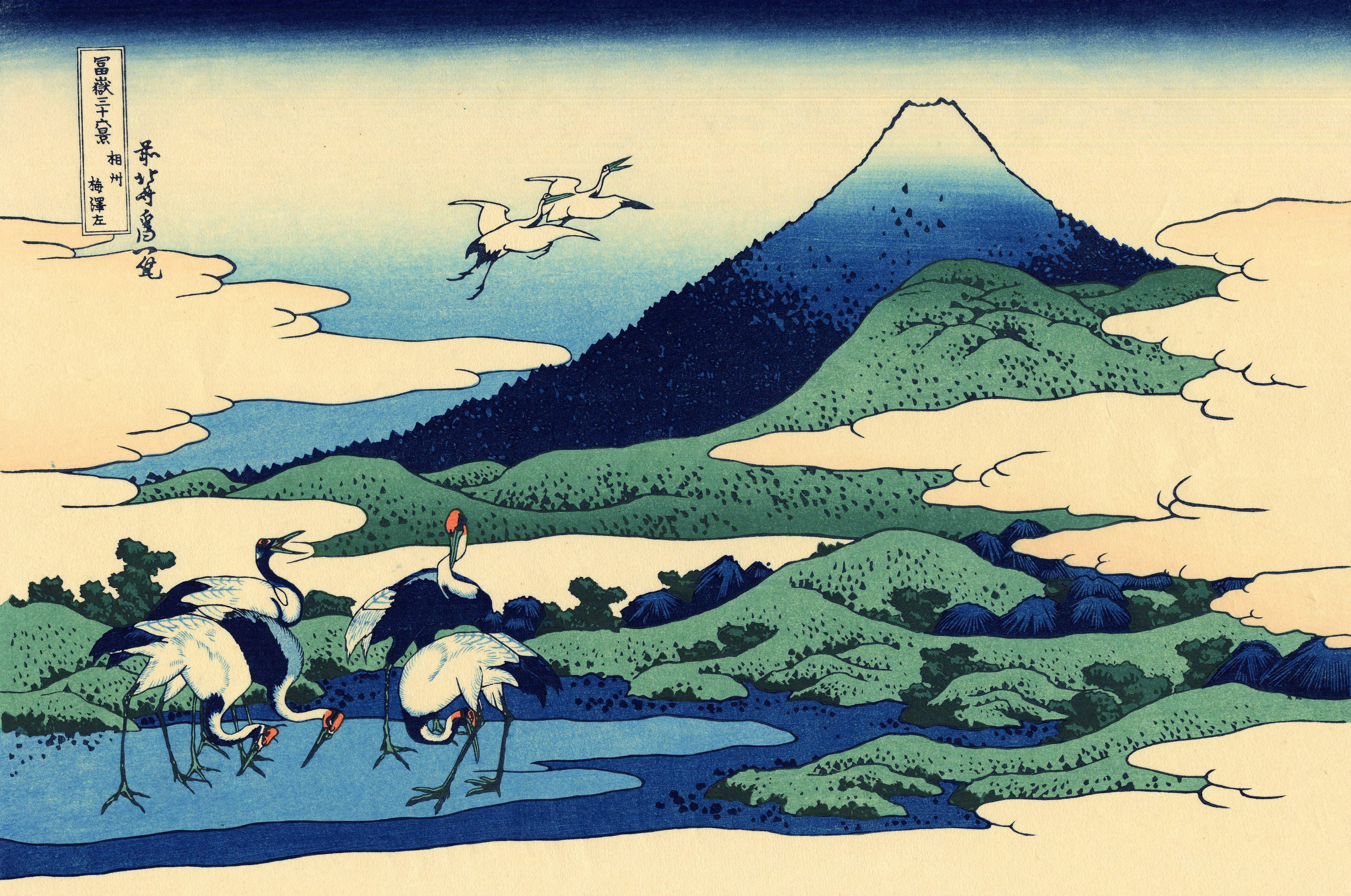
Hokusai

Ninomiya (二宮町, Ninomiya-machi) is a town located in Kanagawa Prefecture, Japan. As of 1 October 2023, the town had an estimated population of 26,968 and a population density of 2970 persons per km^{2}. The total area of the town is 9.08 square kilometres (3.51 sq mi).

== Geography ==
Ninomiya is located on the coast of west-central Kanagawa Prefecture, bordered to the south by Sagami Bay of the Pacific Ocean. In the north, a gentle range of hills called the Oiso Hills extends from east to west. The Kuzugawa River runs through the central part of the town, and the Nakamura River (called the Oshikiri River near the mouth of the river) runs through the western part.

=== Surrounding municipalities ===
Kanagawa Prefecture

- Hiratsuka
- Nakai
- Odawara
- Ōiso

=== Climate ===
Ninomiya has a humid subtropical climate (Köppen Cfa) characterized by warm summers and cool winters with light to no snowfall. The average annual temperature in Ninomiya is 13.4 °C. The average annual rainfall is 2144 mm with September as the wettest month. The temperatures are highest on average in August, at around 24.2 °C, and lowest in January, at around 2.9 °C.

== Demographics ==
Per Japanese census data, the population of Ninomiya peaked around the year 2000 and has declined slightly since then.

Historical population
| Year | Pop. | ±% |
|---|---|---|
| 1920 | 7,055 | — |
| 1930 | 7,960 | +12.8% |
| 1940 | 8,711 | +9.4% |
| 1950 | 12,679 | +45.6% |
| 1960 | 13,607 | +7.3% |
| 1970 | 21,650 | +59.1% |
| 1980 | 27,221 | +25.7% |
| 1990 | 29,415 | +8.1% |
| 2000 | 30,802 | +4.7% |
| 2010 | 29,522 | −4.2% |
| 2020 | 27,564 | −6.6% |

== History ==
Ninomiya was the location of the second-highest ranked shrine in Sagami Province, Kawawa Shrine, which is mentioned in Heian period records, and claims to have been established by the semi-legendary Emperor Suinin. As a minor coastal settlement, it was under the control of the later Hōjō clan of Odawara during the Sengoku period. In the Edo period, it was nominally part of Odawara Domain. After the Meiji Restoration and with the establishment of the district system in 1878, the area came under the control of Yurugi District (淘綾郡, Yurugi-gun). In April 1889, Ninomiya village merged with four neighboring hamlets to form Azuma with the establishment of the modern municipalities system, and on March 26, 1896 Yurugi District became part of modern Naka District. Azuma was elevated to town status on November 3, 1935 and was renamed Ninomiya.

== Government ==
Ninomiya has a mayor-council form of government with a directly elected mayor and a unicameral town council of 14 members. Ninomiya, together with neighboring Ōiso, contributes one member to the Kanagawa Prefectural Assembly. In terms of national politics, the town is part of Kanagawa 15th district of the lower house of the Diet of Japan.

== Economy ==
The local economy of Ninomiya is based primarily on agriculture and commercial fishing. The town is also a bedroom community for both Tokyo/Yokohama and Odawara

== Education ==
Ninomiya has three public elementary schools and two public middle schools operated by the town government, and one public high school operated by the Kanagawa Prefectural Board of Education. There is also one private middle school and one private high school.

== Transportation ==
=== Railway ===
JR East – Tōkaidō Main Line

- Ninomiya

=== Highway ===
- Odawara-Atsugi Road
- National Route 1 (from Tokyo to Osaka, Osaka)

== Local attractions ==
- Azumayama Park
- Kawawa Shrine

== Noted people from Ninomiya ==
- Kinichi Hagimoto, comedian
- Masashi Hosoya, basketball player
