= Japan National Route 133 =

Road in Kanagawa prefecture, Japan

National Route 133
- 国道133号
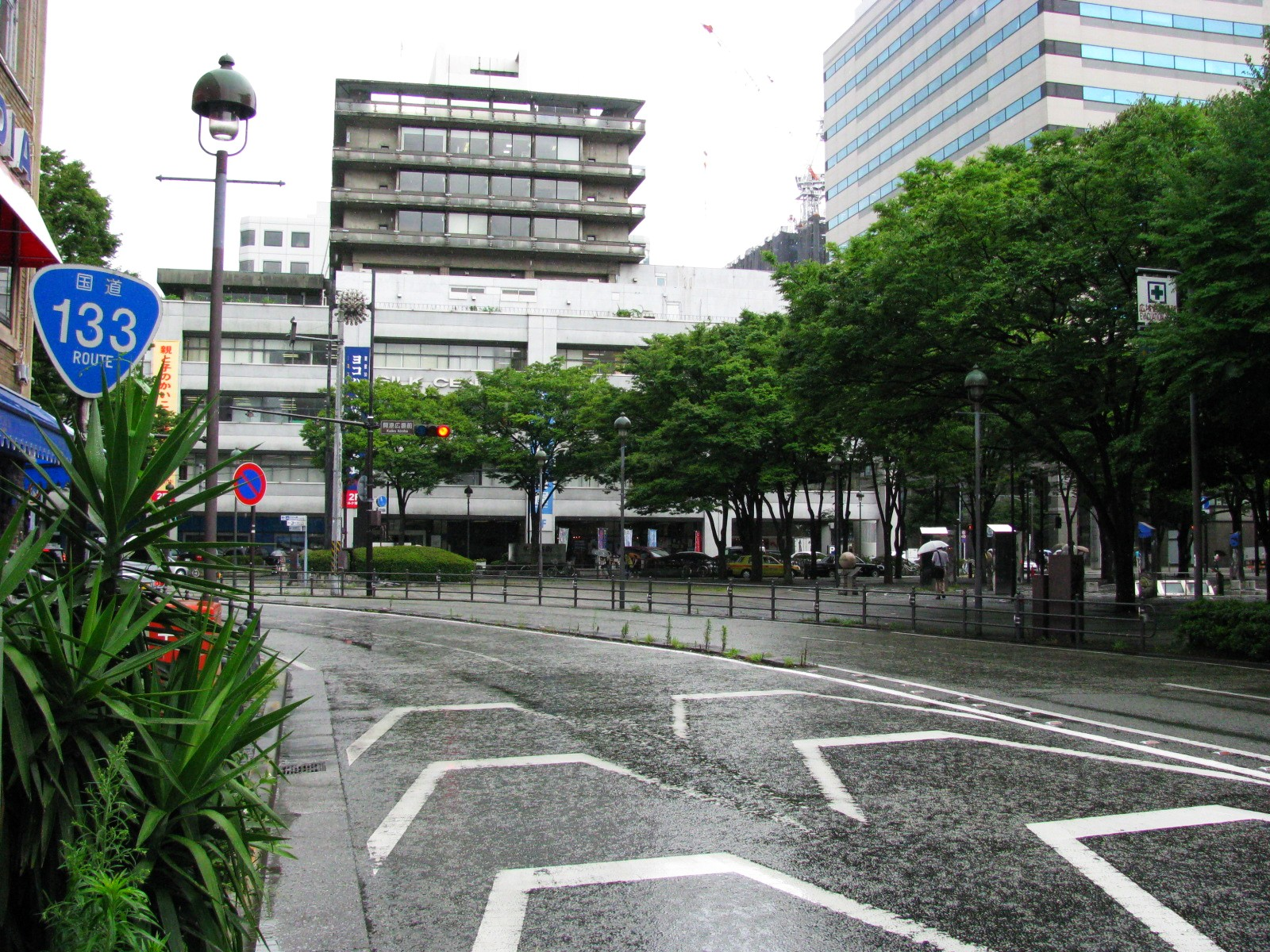

Route information
- Length: 1.4 km (0.87 mi)
- Existed: 1953–present

Major junctions
- East end: Port of Yokohama
- West end: National Route 16 at Sakuragichō, Naka-ku, Yokohama

Location
- Country: Japan

Highway system
- National highways of Japan; Expressways of Japan
← National Route 132	→ National Route 134

National Route 133 is a short national highway of Japan connecting the Port of Yokohama and Sakuragichō, Naka-ku, Yokohama in Japan, with a total length of 1.4 km (0.87 mi).
