= Japan National Route 134 =

National highway in Japan

National Route 134
- 国道134号
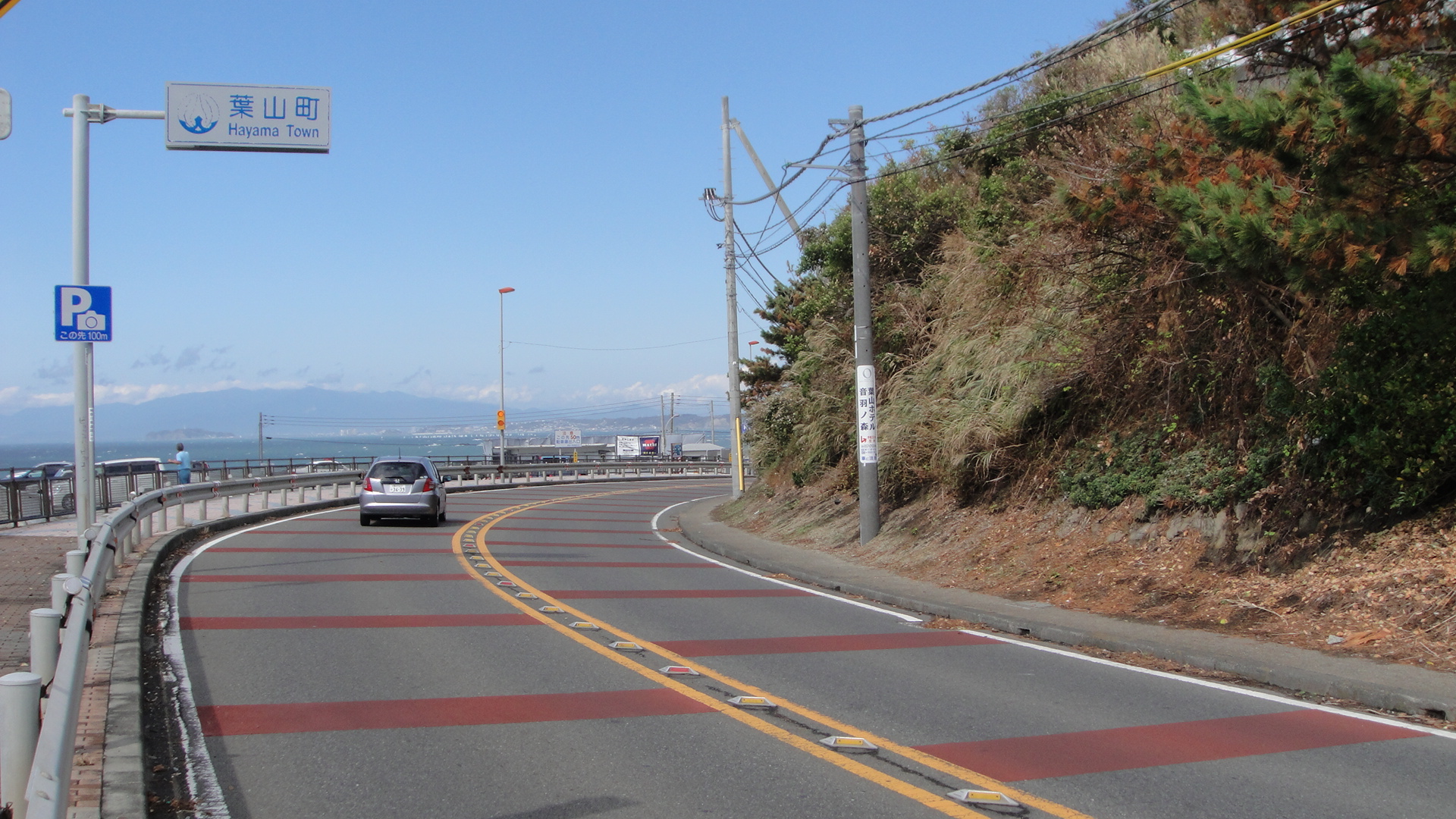

Route information
- Length: 60.6 km (37.7 mi)
- Existed: 1953–present

Major junctions
- West end: National Route 1 in Ōiso
- East end: National Route 16 in Yokosuka

Location
- Country: Japan

Highway system
- National highways of Japan; Expressways of Japan
| ← National Route 133 | → National Route 135 |

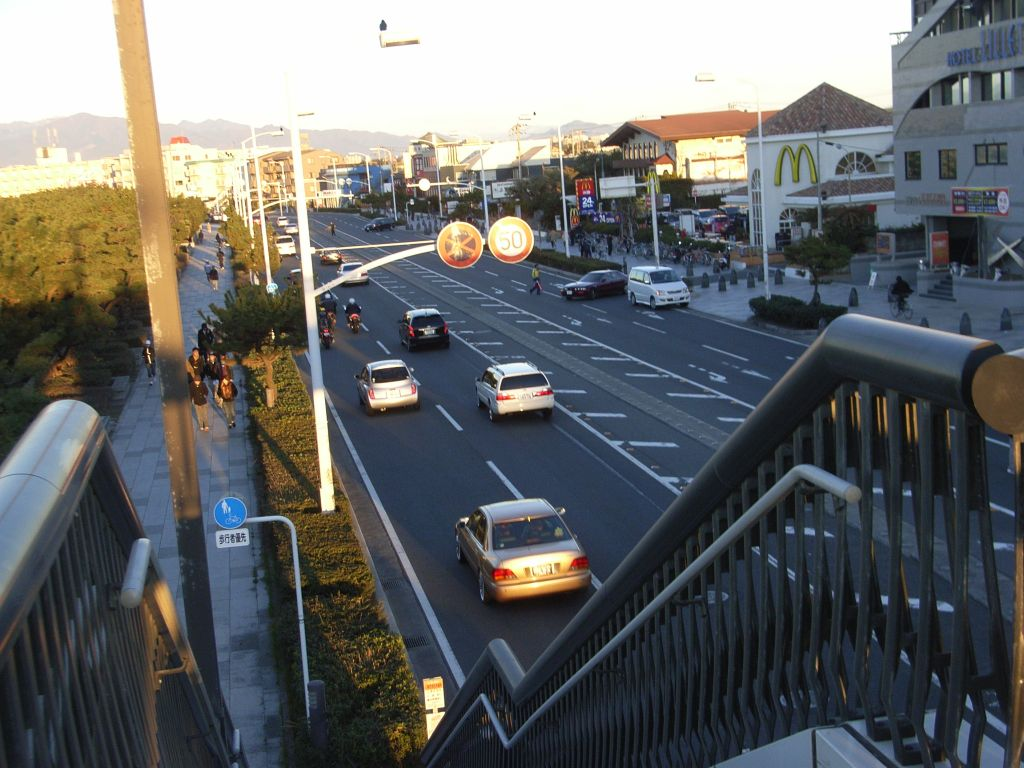
National Route 134

National Route 134 (国道134号, Kokudō hyaku-sanjū-yongō) is a national highway connecting the city of Yokosuka and the town of Ōiso in Kanagawa Prefecture, Japan.
