= Bayshore Route =

Highway between Kanagawa, Tokyo and Chiba prefecture, Japan

Shuto Expressway Bayshore Route 首都高速道路湾岸線
- The Bayshore Route highlighted in red

Route information
- Maintained by Metropolitan Expressway Company Limited
- Length: 62.1 km (38.6 mi)
- Existed: 1976–present

Major junctions
- West end: Yokohama–Yokosuka Road in Yokohama, Kanagawa
- East end: Tokyo Gaikan Expressway; Higashi-Kantō Expressway in Ichikawa, Chiba

Location
- Country: Japan

Highway system
- National highways of Japan; Expressways of Japan

The Bayshore Route (湾岸線, Wangan-sen) signed as Route B, is one of the routes of the tolled Shuto Expressway system in the Greater Tokyo Area. The Bayshore Route is a 62.1-kilometer (38.6 mi) stretch of toll highway that runs from the Kanazawa ward of Yokohama in the west, northeast to the city of Ichikawa in Chiba Prefecture in the east. Opened in phases beginning in 1976 and ending in 2001, it is an important route that runs between the artificial islands lining the western shore of Tokyo Bay by way of bridges and sub-sea tunnels that bypass central Tokyo.

== Route description ==
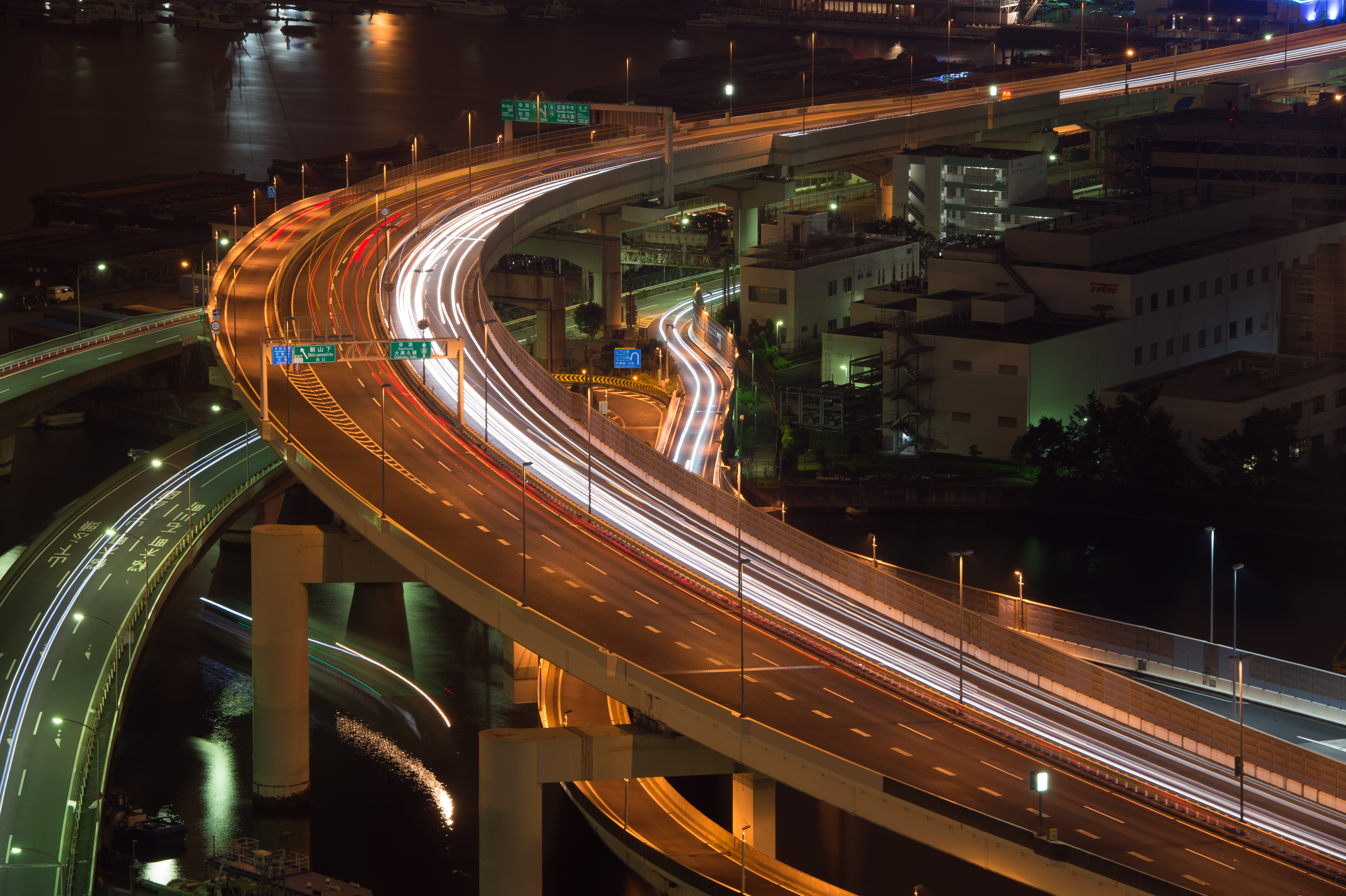
The Bayshore Route in Yokohama

The Bayshore Route is a tolled expressway in the Shuto Expressway network of the Greater Tokyo Area and the only route of the network that serves Chiba Prefecture. It is called Route B after its name in English, Bayshore. The road was constructed by the Metropolitan Expressway Company as a motorway to add capacity to the existing National Route 357. It now runs parallel to the older road, which is used by more local traffic. For administrative purposes, the expressway is also designated on prefecture-level as Route 294 by Chiba Prefecture, Kanagawa Prefecture and Tokyo.

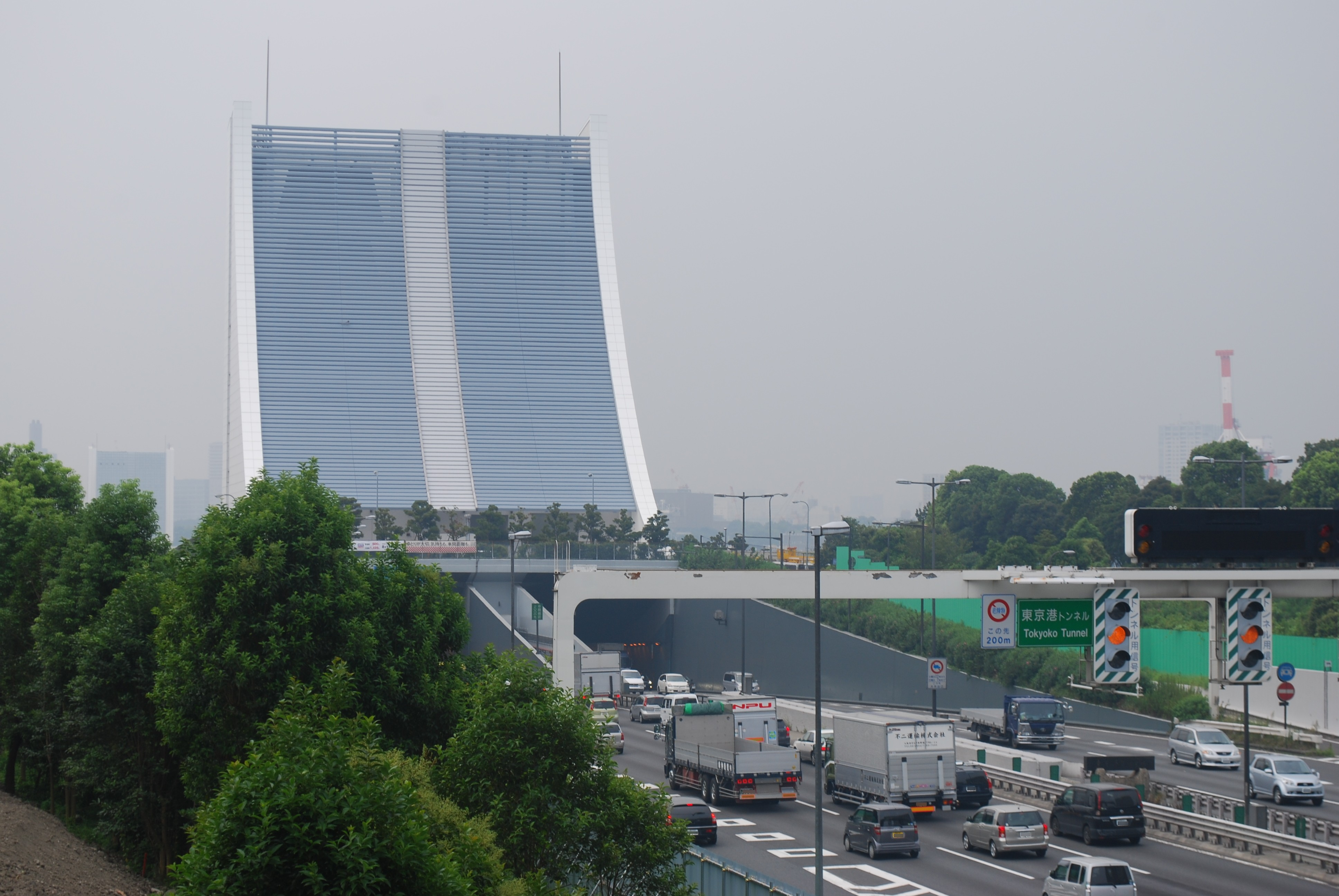
Tokyo-ko tunnel entrance in Shinagawa, Tokyo

The western terminus of the Bayshore Route lies at the eastern end of a spur route of the Yokohama–Yokosuka Road in the Kanazawa ward of Yokohama. The Bayshore Route runs from Yokohama across the Yokohama Bay and Tsurumi Tsubasa Bridges, through the Kawasaki Subsea, the Tama Subriver, Haneda Airport North, and Tokyo Bay Subsea Tunnels, which connects it to the popular tourist spot of Odaiba, and then on to Urayasu (near Tokyo Disneyland) in Chiba Prefecture. The expressway facilitates direct road travel between Chiba and Kanagawa prefectures as well as Narita and Haneda Airports. It also serves to link the ends of all of Tokyo's ring roads, aside from the Inner Circular Route. As a result, it is used as a bypass for the heavily congested city center of Tokyo. Owing to the nature of the route from Kanagawa passing through Tokyo to Chiba, the direction of travel is represented in Japanese by "eastbound/westbound" rather than the Japanese norm of "up/down" direction that only functions relative to the direction one is traveling and Tokyo. The eastern terminus of the Bayshore Route connects to the southern terminus of the Higashi-Kantō Expressway and the eastern end of the Tokyo Gaikan Expressway at Kōya Junction.

=== Traffic ===
The Ministry of Land, Infrastructure, Transport and Tourism (MLIT), conducts surveys on the Japan's national routes and expressways every five years to measure their average daily traffic. In 2015, the most utilized point along the expressway was in the Kōtō ward of Tokyo between Tatsumi Junction and Shinkiba, where a daily average of 163,404 vehicles traveled on the Bayshore Route. The least busy section of the expressway was in Yokohama between its western terminus and the interchange at Sugita, there it carried an average of only 27,268 vehicles. Generally, the expressway is more heavily used between Haneda Airport and Chiba Prefecture. From Haneda to Yokohama, traffic levels slowly drop, then decline sharply beyond Honmoku Junction.

Cargo from Narita International Airport in Chiba destined for southern areas travels on large trucks on the Bayshore Route, though the opening of Chubu International Airport helped ease heavy truck congestion on the expressway. It is notable as Tokyo's first offshore highway, providing sightseers with urban views of Minato Mirai 21, Odaiba, the Rainbow Bridge, downtown Yokohama, and the Yokohama Bay Bridge. Although the expressway is heavily congested during the day, it is frequented by street racers during late night hours. From the late 1980s all the way to 1999 there was a presence on the Bayshore Route with street racers racing along the expressway's long, straight stretches; however, due to increased police presence the street racing scene has since dwindled.

== History ==
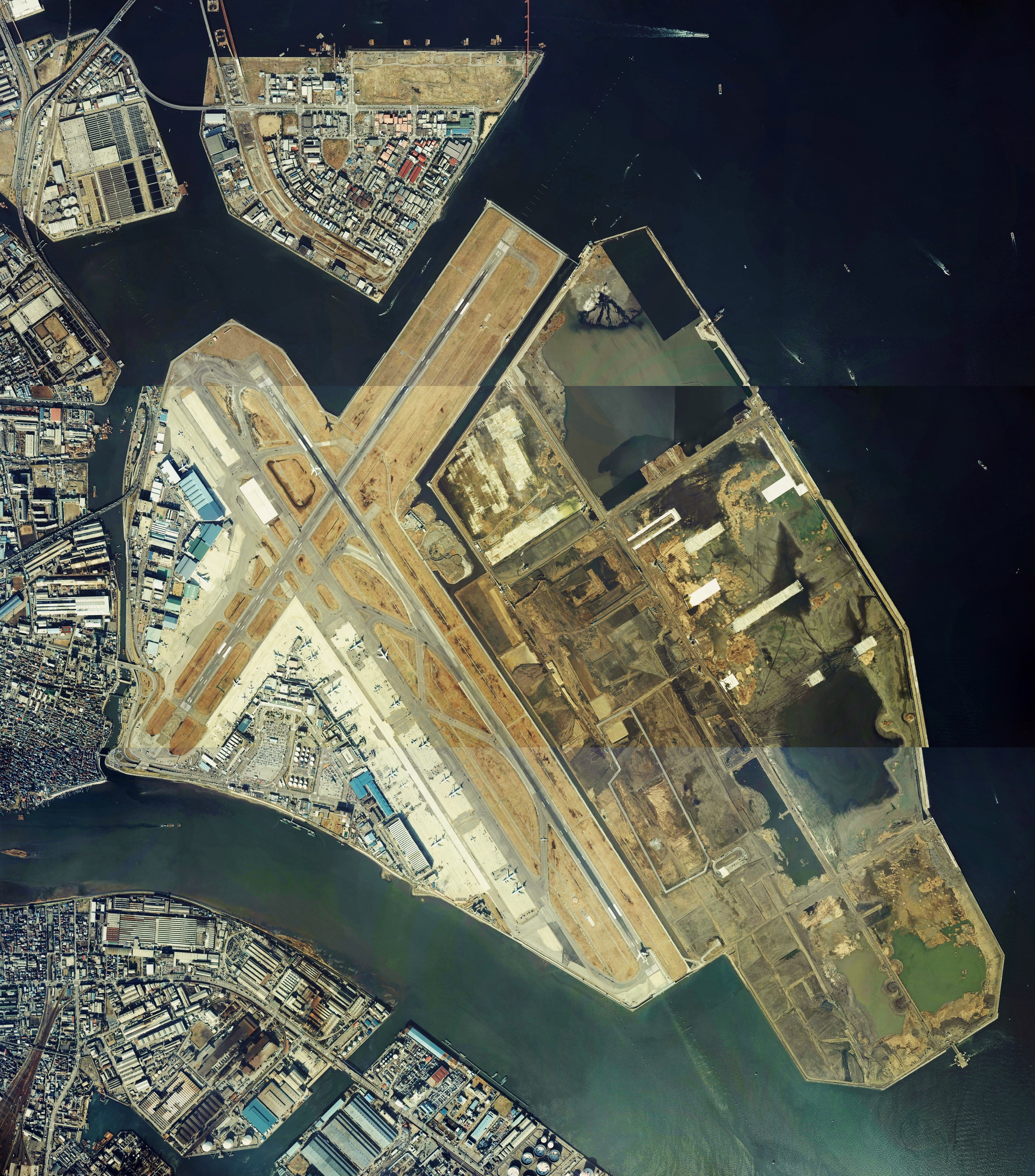
Haneda Airport Reclamation Project under construction in 1984, including the Bayshore Route section between Keihinjima and Haneda Airport and Haneda Route

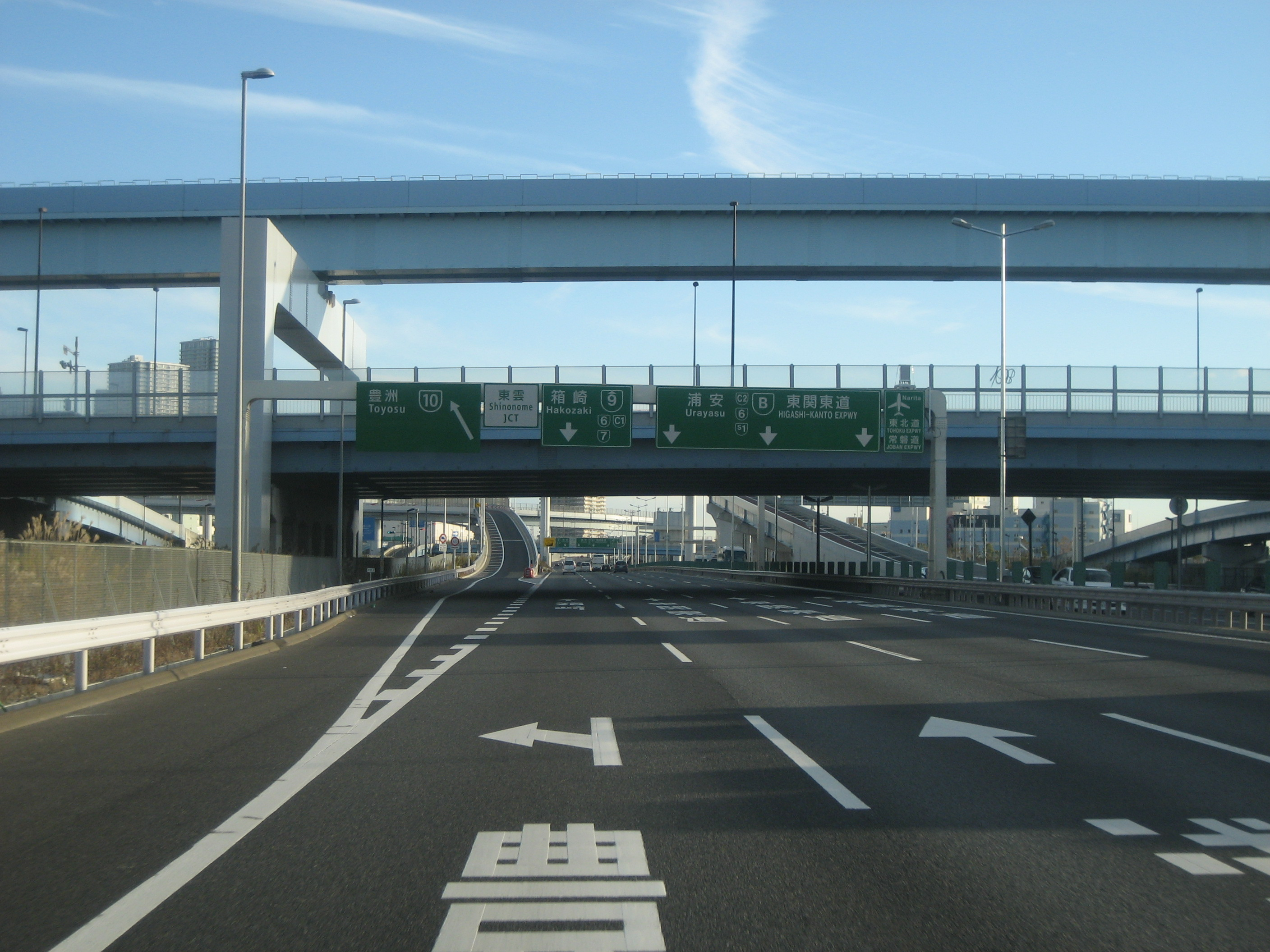
The eight-lane Bayshore Route at Shinonome Junction in the Kōtō ward of Tokyo

The first section of the Bayshore Route was completed in August 1976 between Ōi and Rinkai-fukutoshin. It was expanded in stages with the earlier phases of construction generally taking place in Tokyo and Chiba. The first section of the expressway to open in Kanagawa Prefecture, where later phases of the expressway's construction were completed, opened in January 1989. The Bayshore Route was selected in April 2000 to be one of two trial routes of the Shuto Expressway network for the implementation of electronic toll collection (ETC). The ETC system was popular among the route's drivers and was implemented throughout the network in December 2003. The final link in the expressway's route was opened in October 2001 when the expressway was completed between the interchanges at Sugita and Sankeien.

There have been several developments on the Bayshore Route since its completion in 2001. Between 2004 and 2008, the expressway was widened to four lanes in each direction in a series of projects in the wards of Minato and Kōtō. The first of these widening projects was completed in 2004 on the westbound side of the expressway between Shinkiba and Tatsumi Junction on 17 September 2004. The final stage of the project was completed in March 2008 with the widening of the eastbound section of the Bayshore Route between Tatsumi and Ariake Junction. Part of this expansion project also made room for the addition of Shinonome Junction where the Bayshore Route meets the southern terminus of the Harumi Route. The junction was opened on 11 February 2009.

On 4 March 2017, the interchange at Minami-honmoku futō in Yokohama was completed, providing a direct connection from the Bayshore Route to Honmoku Wharf by a 2.5-kilometer-long (1.6 mi) viaduct. Kōya Junction was expanded on 2 June 2018 to add the Tokyo Gaikan Expressway to the highways served by the terminal junction of the Bayshore Route.

=== Street racing ===
The Bayshore Route (also known as the Wangan route), received worldwide notoriety during the 1990s as the home course for Mid Night, one of the most notorious street racing clubs, who were known for their 300 km/h, sometimes 320 km/h exploits. Tuning companies such as Top Secret also set well-known illegal speed records on the Wangan such as 0-400 km/h (0-249 mph), 0-300km/h (0-186 mph), 1000m, and top speed challenges, often with a Toyota Supra A80. These exploits and street racing culture on the Shuto Expressway have made the Bayshore Route a well-known location for street racing and speed records.

Due to this infamy, the Wangan is the setting for several entertainment franchises, such as the manga and arcade game Wangan Midnight, video games Shutokou Battle and Gran Turismo 5, 6, Sport and 7 (as the street circuit) and the movie series Shuto Kousoku Trial. Numerous car enthusiast magazines and DVDs, like Best Motoring, also highlight races and activities on the Wangan.

== Junction list ==
Prefecture	Location	km	mi	Exit	Name	Destinations	Notes
Kanagawa	Yokohama	0.0	0.0	—		Yokohama–Yokosuka Road west (Kanazawa spur) – Yokosuka, Miura	Western terminus, expressway continues west as the Yokohama–Yokosuka Road
Kanagawa	Yokohama	0.9	0.56	B01	Sachiura	National Route 357 – Hakkeijima, Uminokōen	Westbound exit, eastbound entrance
Kanagawa	Yokohama	2.8	1.7	—	Torihamachō Toll Booth		Toll booth for eastbound traffic
Kanagawa	Yokohama	4.0	2.5	B02 / B03	Sugita	National Route 357 – Sugita, Kannai, Honmoku, Hakkeijima	
Kanagawa	Yokohama	6.1	3.8	B05	Isogo	National Route 357 – Hakkeijima, Sugita; Yokohama City Loop Route 2 (Byōbugaura Bypass) – Shin-Yokohama, Hino	Westbound exit, eastbound entrance
Kanagawa	Yokohama	10.9	6.8	B06	Sankeien	National Route 357 – Yamashita Park, Honmoku Wharf	Westbound entrance, eastbound exit
Kanagawa	Yokohama	13.0	8.1	B07A	Minami-honmoku futō	Minami-honmoku Avenue	Westbound exit, eastbound entrance
Kanagawa	Yokohama	14.3	8.9	B07B	Honmoku futō	National Route 357 west – Hakkeijima, Isogo, A, B, C, and D pier	Westbound exit, eastbound entrance
Kanagawa	Yokohama	14.3	8.9	—	Honmoku	Kariba Route west – to Yokohama Shindō, Daisan Keihin Road	
Kanagawa	Yokohama	17.4	10.8	B08 / B09	Daikoku	Daikoku Route north – to Daikoku Parking Area, Yokohane Route, Yokohama North Route, Shin-Yokohama; Ōgurobashi-dōri – Umizuri Park, Namamugi, Daikoku Pier	
Kanagawa	Kawasaki	24.0– 26.5	14.9– 16.5	B10 / B11	Higashiōgishima	National Route 357 – to National Route 132, central Kawasaki, Kawasaki Port	
Kanagawa	Kawasaki	26.6– 28.6	16.5– 17.8	Port of Kawasaki Tunnel			
Kanagawa	Kawasaki	29.5	18.3	—	Kawasaki-Ukishima	Tokyo Bay Aqua-Line east / National Route 409 east – Kisarazu; Kawasaki Route west – Central Kawasaki	
Kanagawa	Kawasaki	29.5	18.3	B12 / B13	Ukishima	National Route 409 west – Ukishimachō	
Kanagawa–Tokyo border		29.6 31.8	18.4 19.8	Tamagawa Tunnel under the Tama River			
Tokyo	Ōta	31.8	19.8	B14	Wangan Kanpachi	National Route 357 east – to Kanpachi-dōri, Haneda Airport Terminal 1, International Terminal	Westbound entrance, eastbound exit
Tokyo	Ōta	34.5	21.4	B16 / B17	Haneda Airport	National Route 357 – Haneda Airport Terminal 2	
Tokyo	Ōta	35.2 36.7	21.9 22.8	Kūkō-kita Tunnel under Haneda Airport			
Tokyo	Ōta	38.6	24.0	—	Tōkai	Haneda Route south – to Yokohane Route, Yokohamakōen	Westbound exit, eastbound entrance
Tokyo	Shinagawa	39.0	24.2	PA	Ōi	Parking area	
Tokyo	Shinagawa	39.4	24.5	B18 / B19	Ōi-minami	National Route 357 – Central Shinagawa, Haneda Airport, Katsushima, Ōi Wharf	
Tokyo	Shinagawa	41.1	25.5	—	Ōi	Central Circular Route north – to Shibuya Route, Tōmei Expressway, Chūō Expressway; Haneda Route north – to Inner Circular Route	No access from Haneda Route to Bayshore Route
Tokyo	Shinagawa	41.3	25.7	B21	Ōi	National Route 357 – Central Shinagawa, Ōimachi	Westbound exit, eastbound entrance
Tokyo	Shinagawa–Minato border	41.4 42.7	25.7 26.5	Tokyo-kō Tunnel under Tokyo Bay			
Tokyo	Minato	43.1	26.8	B22	Rinkai-fukutoshin	National Route 357 – Daiba, Tokyo Big Sight, Ferry Wharf	Westbound entrance, eastbound exit
Tokyo	Kōtō	44.9	27.9	—	Ariake	Daiba Route west – to Inner Circular Route, Rainbow Bridge	
Tokyo	Kōtō	45.9	28.5	—	Shinonome	Harumi Route north – Toyosu	
Tokyo	Kōtō	45.9	28.5	B23	Ariake	National Route 357 – Daiba, Tokyo Big Sight, Ferry Wharf	Westbound exit, eastbound entrance
Tokyo	Kōtō	47.6	29.6	—	Tatsumi	Fukagawa Route north – to Mukojima Route, Hakozaki	Interchange features a parking area
Tokyo	Kōtō	49.0	30.4	B24 / B25	Shinkiba	National Route 357 – Tokyo Heliport, Yumenoshima, Meiji-dōri, Shinkiba, Minamisuna	
Tokyo	Edogawa	50.9	31.6	—	Kasai	Central Circular Route north – to Mukojima Route, Tōhoku Expressway, Jōban Expressway	
Tokyo	Edogawa	52.3	32.5	B26 / B27	Kasai	National Route 357 – Kannana-dōri, Kasai Rinkai Park	
Chiba	Urayasu	53.7	33.4	B28	Maihama	Entrance ramp from Tokyo Disney Resort	Westbound entrance only
Chiba	Urayasu	55.7	34.6	B30 / B31	Urayasu	National Route 357 – Tokyo Disney Resort	
Chiba	Ichikawa	59.6	37.0	B32	Chidorichō	National Route 357 – Funabashi, central Ichikawa	Southbound entrance, eastbound exit
Chiba	Ichikawa	60.5	37.6	—	Ichikawa Toll Booth		Toll booth and parking area for westbound traffic
Chiba	Ichikawa	62.1	38.6	—	Kōya	Tokyo Gaikan Expressway north – Misato, Kawaguchi; Higashi-Kantō Expressway north – Narita, Chiba, Narita	Eastern terminus, expressway continues north as the Higashi-Kantō Expressway
1.000 mi = 1.609 km; 1.000 km = 0.621 mi: Closed/former; Incomplete access; Route transition

== In popular culture ==
- Wangan Midnight, a manga and anime series based on street racing on the Wangan.
- Wangan Midnight Maximum Tune, an arcade racing game taking place on the Wangan.
- Tokyo Xtreme Racer, known in Japan as Shutokō Battle (首都高, abbreviation for "Shuto Expressway"), a Genki game based on Wangan racing

== See also ==
- Shuto Kosoku Trial, a series of six movies about Wangan racing that have been banned from Japan.
