= Japan National Route 15 =

National highway in Japan

National Route 15
- 国道15号

Route information
- Length: 29.2 km (18.1 mi)
- Existed: 4 December 1952–present

Major junctions
- North end: National Route 1 in Nihonbashi, Chūō, Tokyo
- National Route 130; National Route 357; National Route 131; National Route 409; National Route 132
- South end: National Route 1 in Yokohama

Location
- Country: Japan

Highway system
- National highways of Japan; Expressways of Japan
← National Route 14	→ National Route 16

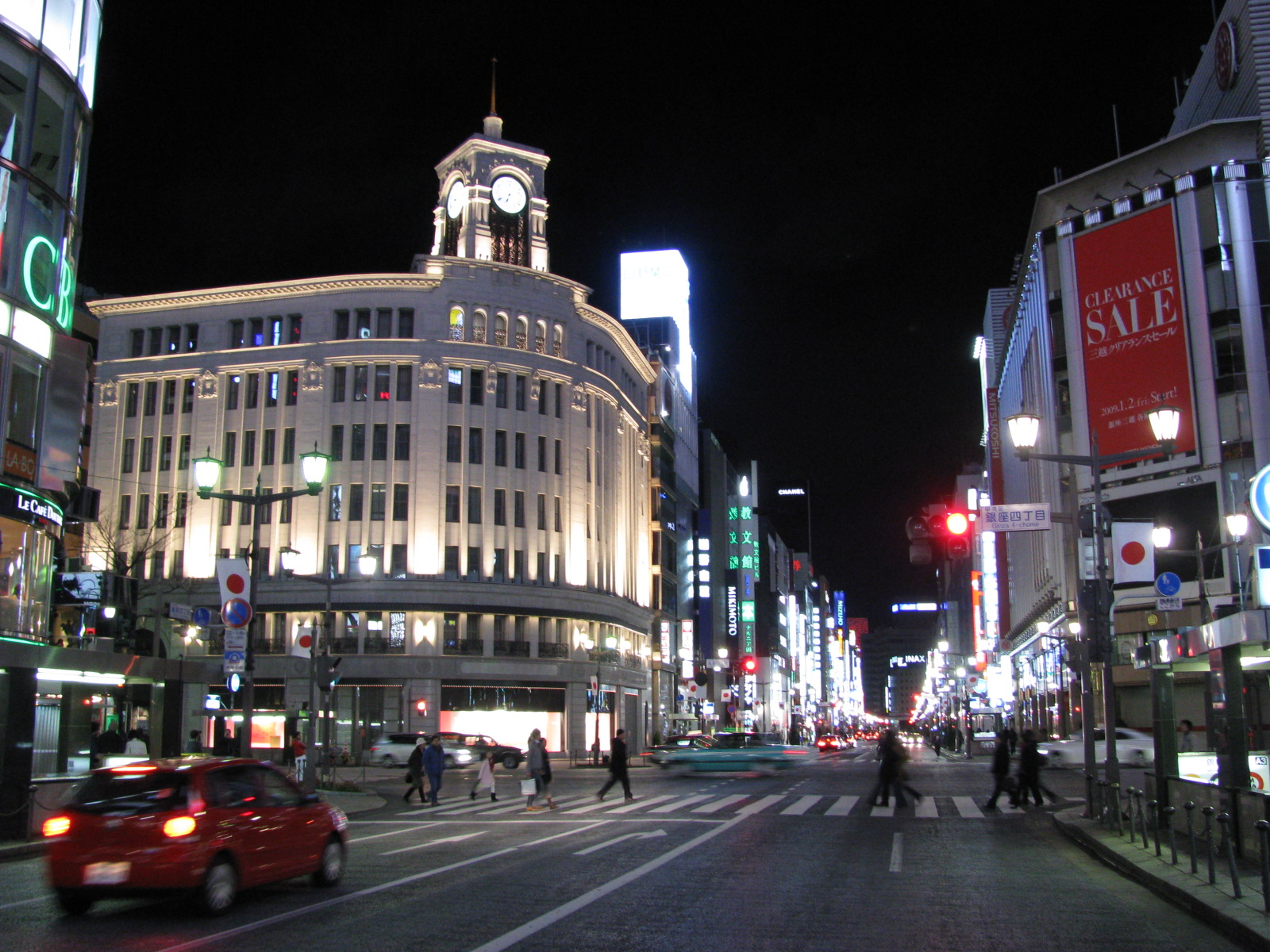
Route 15 (Ginza of Chūō, Tokyo)

National Route 15 (国道15号, Kokudō Jūgo-gō) is a national highway connecting Tokyo and Yokohama in Japan. It is commonly referred to as Dai-Ichi Keihin (第一京浜).

== Route data ==
- Length: 29.2 km (18.1 mi)
- Origin: Nihonbashi, Chūō, Tokyo (originates at junction with Route 1, Route 4, Route 6, Route 14, Route 17 and Route 20)
- Terminus: Yokohama (ends at Junction with Route 1)
- Major cities: Kawasaki

== History ==
- 4 December 1952 – First Class National Highway 15 (from Tokyo to Yokohama)
- 1 April 1965 – General National Highway 15 (from Tokyo to Yokohama)

== Municipalities passed through ==
- Tokyo
  - Chūō – Minato – Shinagawa – Ōta
- Kanagawa Prefecture
  - Kawasaki (Kawasaki-ku, Kanagawa) – Yokohama (Tsurumi – Kanagawa)

== Intersects with ==
- Tokyo
  - Routes 1, 4, 6, 14, 17 and 20 at the origin
  - Route 130 at Minato-ku
  - Yashio Bypass, Route 357 at Shinagawa-ku
  - Route 131 at Ōta-ku
- Kanagawa Prefecture
  - Routes 132 and 409 at Kawasaki-ku, Kawasaki
  - Route 1, at the terminus
