= List of highways numbered 358 =

The following highways are numbered 358:

== Canada ==
- Nova Scotia Route 358
- Prince Edward Island Route 358
- Quebec Route 358
- Saskatchewan Highway 358

== Japan ==
- Japan National Route 358

== United States ==
- Arkansas Highway 358
- Georgia State Route 358
- Indiana State Road 358
- Kentucky Route 358
- Maryland Route 358
- New York State Route 358 (former)
- Ohio State Route 358
- Pennsylvania Route 358
- Puerto Rico Highway 358
- Tennessee State Route 358
- Texas:
  - Texas State Highway 358
  - Texas State Highway Loop 358 (former)
- Virginia State Route 358

Preceded by 357	Lists of highways 358	Succeeded by 359
