= Sudo (disambiguation) =

sudo is a program for Unix-like computer operating systems.

Sudo or SUDO may also refer to:

- Sudan Social Development Organization, a non-profit organisation
- Sudo Station, a railway station in Fuji, Shizuoka Prefecture, Japan

== People ==
- Aki Sudo, Japanese female ice hockey player
- Akiko Sudo, Japanese female football player
- Akira Sudō (Akira Sudou, born 1971), Japanese female rock vocalist
- Daisuke Sudo, Japanese football player and manager
- Genki Sudo, Japanese former mixed martial artist
- Maasa Sudo, Japanese actress, singer, and tarento
- Miki Sudo (born 1985), American competitive eater
- Satoru Sudo, Japanese ice sledge hockey player
- Shigemitsu Sudo, Japanese football player and manager
- Takafumi Sudo, Japanese footballer
- Yusuke Sudo, Japanese football player
- Prince Sawara (750?–785), elevated posthumously to become Emperor Sudō

== See also ==
- Sudo Honke, Japanese manufacturer of sake, run by the Sudo family
