= List of highways numbered 359 =

The following highways are numbered 359:

== Canada ==
- Manitoba Provincial Road 359
- Nova Scotia Route 359
- Quebec Route 359

== Japan ==
- Japan National Route 359

== United States ==
- Interstate 359
- Arkansas Highway 359
- Georgia State Route 359 (former)
- Maryland Route 359
  - Maryland Route 359
- Nevada State Route 359
- New York:
  - New York State Route 359
    - New York State Route 359 (former)
  - County Route 359 (Albany County, New York)
- Puerto Rico Highway 359
- Texas:
  - Texas State Highway 359
  - Farm to Market Road 359
- Virginia State Route 359

| Preceded by 358 | Lists of highways 359 | Succeeded by 360 |
