= K360 =

K360 or K-360 may refer to:

- K-360 (Kansas highway), a state highway in Kansas
- Mazda K360, a truck
- K.360 Six Variations on "Hélas, j'ai perdu mon amant" by Mozart (1781)
