= R-360 =

R360 or R-360 may refer to:

- SEGA R360, a motion arcade cabinet and cockpit for videogaming arcade games
- Radeon R360 videocard
- Mazda R360 (1960–1966), a Japanese kei car
- R-360 Neptune, a Ukrainian anti-ship cruise missile
- Rugby 360, a proposed international rugby league and rugby union competition
- R360 road (disambiguation)

== See also ==
- List of highways numbered 360 (roads numbered 360)
- 360 (disambiguation)
- R (disambiguation)
