= Tsurumi Tsubasa Bridge =

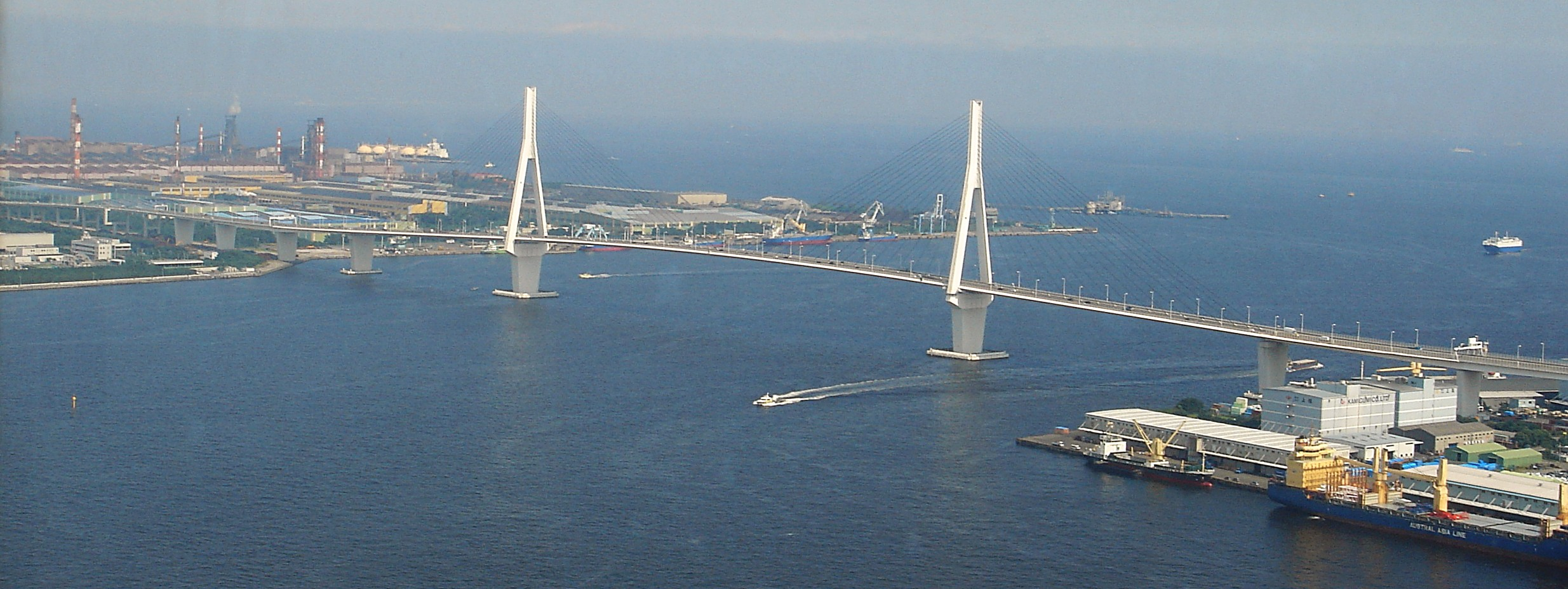
- Coordinates: 35.472222°N 139.699583°E
- Carries: 3 lanes of Bayshore Route
- Crosses: Port of Yokohama
- Locale: between Ougishima and Daikoku Pier, Tsurumi-ku, Yokohama, Kanagawa
- Official name: Tsurumi Tsubasa Bridge

Characteristics
- Design: cable-stayed bridge
- Total length: 1,021 metres (3,350 ft)
- Longest span: 510 metres (1,670 ft)

History
- Construction end: 1994

Location
- Interactive map of Tsurumi Tsubasa Bridge

The Tsurumi Tsubasa Bridge (鶴見つばさ橋, Tsurumi tsubasa bashi) is a cable-stayed bridge located at the western side of Yokohama Bay and is part of the Shuto Expressway's Bayshore Route across the Port of Yokohama, Kanagawa prefecture in Japan. The bridge has a main span of 510 metres (1,670 ft) and two side spans of 255 metres (837 ft).

== See also ==
- Transport in Japan
- List of largest cable-stayed bridges
- Yokohama Bay Bridge
- Rainbow Bridge (Tokyo)
