= R360 road =

R360 road may refer to:

- R360 road (Ireland)
- R360 road (South Africa)

== See also ==
- List of highways numbered 360
- R-360 (disambiguation)
