= Japan National Route 131 =

Road in Tokyo, Japan

National Route 131
- 国道131号
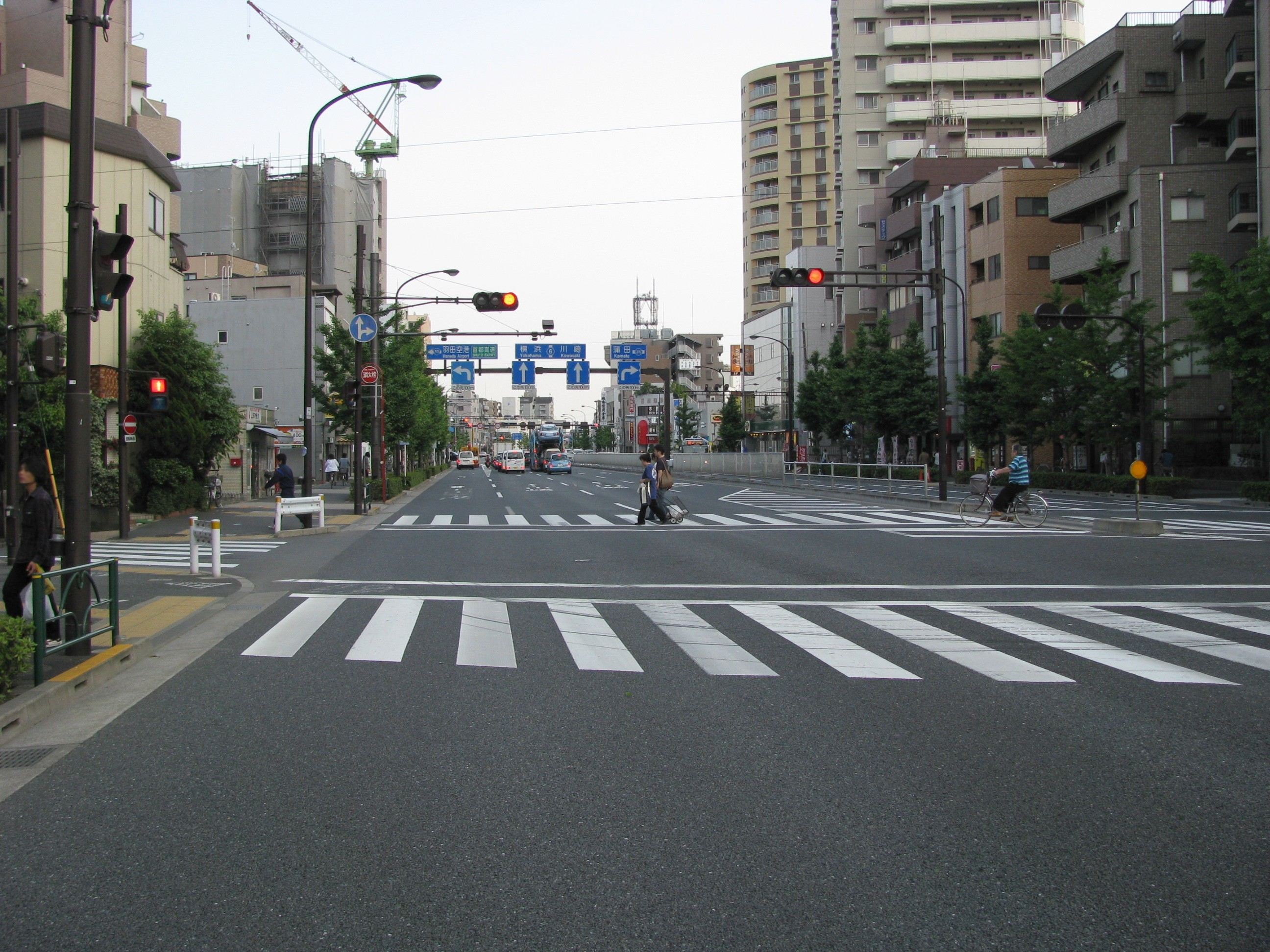

Route information
- Length: 3.6 km (2.2 mi)
- Existed: 1953–present

Major junctions
- East end: Haneda Airport
- West end: National Route 15 in Ōta, Tokyo

Location
- Country: Japan

Highway system
- National highways of Japan; Expressways of Japan
← National Route 130	→ National Route 132

National Route 131 is a national highway of Japan connecting Haneda Airport and Ōmori-Higashi 2-chōme, Ōta, Tokyo, in Japan, with a total length of 3.6 km (2.24 mi).
