= Yokohama Bay Bridge =

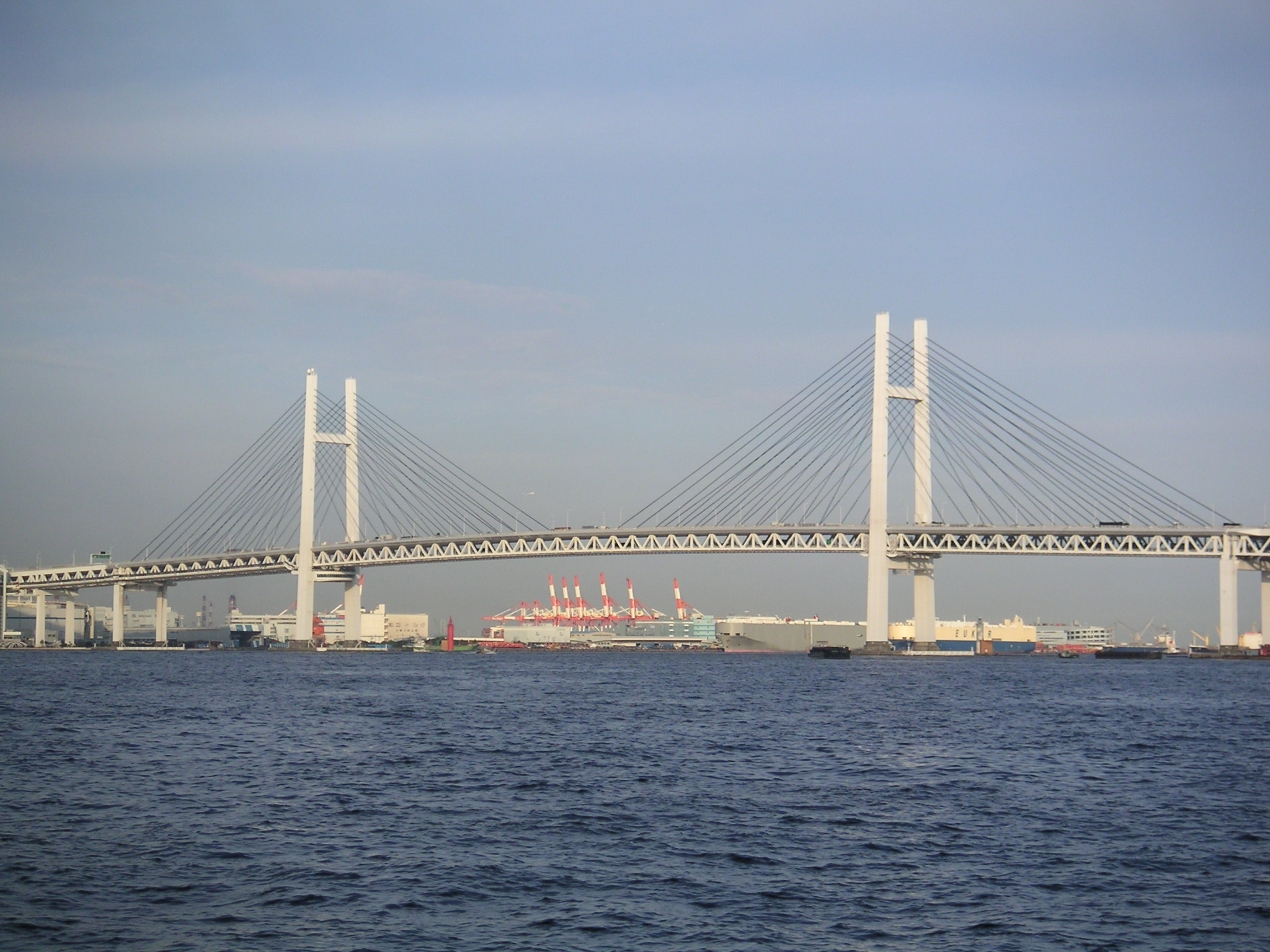
- Coordinates: 35°27′18″N 139°40′27″E
- Carries: 3 lanes of Bayshore Route (upper), 1 lane of National Route 357 (lower), prohibited to pedestrians or bicycles
- Crosses: Port of Yokohama
- Locale: between Honmoku and Daikoku Pier, Naka-ku, Yokohama, Kanagawa

Characteristics
- Design: Cable-stayed
- Total length: 860 metres (2,820 ft)
- Width: 40.2 metres (132 ft)
- Height: 172 metres (564 ft)
- Longest span: 460 m (1,509.2 ft)
- Clearance above: Higher truck loads possible
- Clearance below: 55 metres (180 ft)

History
- Opened: September 27, 1989

Location
- Interactive map of Yokohama Bay Bridge

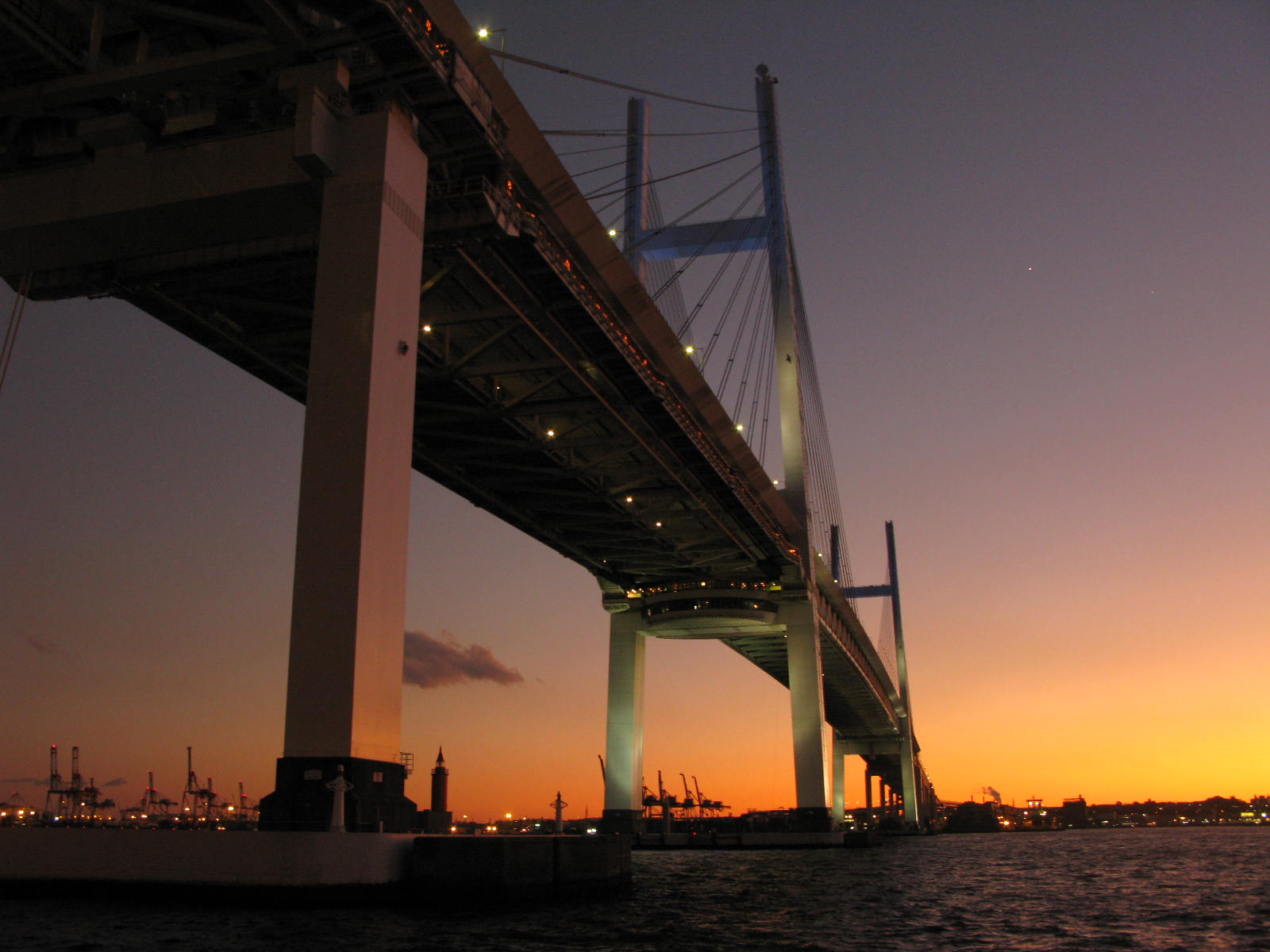
Yokohama Bay Bridge at dawn

The Yokohama Bay Bridge (横浜ベイブリッジ, Yokohama Bei Buridji) is an 860 metres (2,820 ft) cable stayed bridge in Yokohama, Japan. Opened September 27, 1989, it crosses Tokyo Bay with a span of 460 metres (1,510 feet). The toll is ¥600. The bridge is part of the Bayshore Route of the Shuto Expressway.
