= Top Secret (company) =

Japanese automobile tuner and parts manufacturer

Top Secret Co., Ltd.
- Native name: 株式会社トップシークレット
- Industry: Motorsport
- Founder: Kazuhiko "Smoky" Nagata
- Headquarters: Chiba Prefecture, Chiba City
- Products: Automotive Performance Parts
- Operating income: (£1,500.300)
- Website: http://www.topsecret-jpn.com/

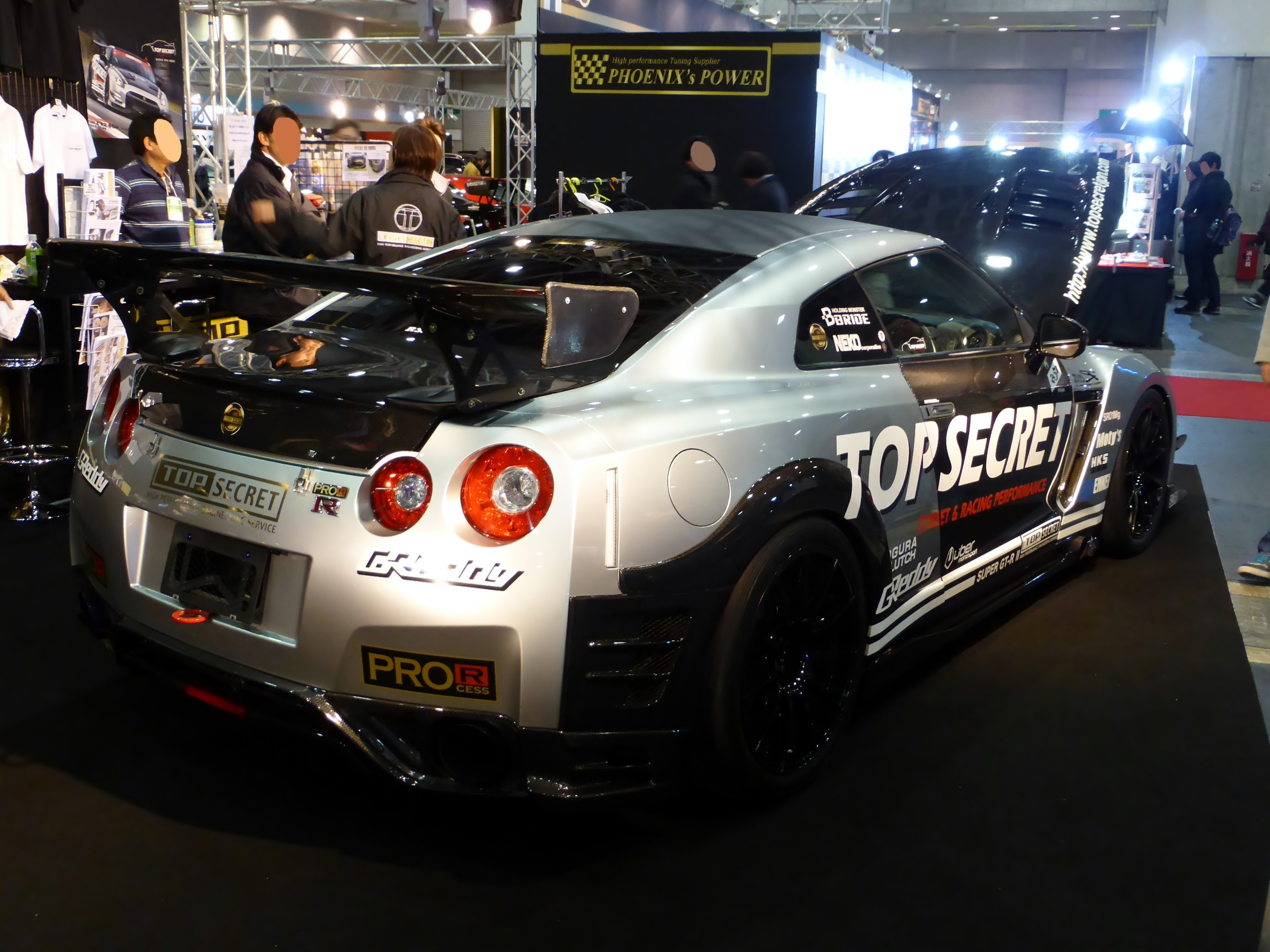
Top Secret Nissan R35 GT-R at Osaka Auto Messe

Top Secret Co., Ltd. (株式会社トップシークレット, Kabushiki-gaisha Toppu Shīkuretto) is a Japanese automobile tuner and parts manufacturer. The company was founded by Japanese automotive engineer and driver, Kazuhiko “Smoky” Nagata.

The company is mainly known for its tuning, aftermarket parts, body kits, and performance engineering. Top Secret's current product lineup consists of aero, exterior and interior, engine, exhaust, chassis, brake, suspension, and powertrain parts.

Top Secret is also known for its illegal Wangan high speed runs, professional drifting, circuit racing, and drag racing.

== History ==
Founder Kazuhiko "Smoky" Nagata began his career as a mechanic for Toyota as their youngest employee. He then became a tuner and fabricator at Trust/GReddy. As he began using the Trust shop for his own personal projects in 1978, the name "Top Secret" was born, as a nickname for his discreet work at the Trust facility. His employers allowed this to continue as Nagata was a highly skilled employee and valuable asset to the company.

Top Secret became independent from Trust in 1991 and set up their own shop in Chiba. In 1993, the company began exhibiting at the Tokyo Auto Salon.

Since 1994, Nagata and the Top Secret team have participated in speed trials and speed challenges such as 0–400 km/h (0-249 mph), 0–300 km/h (0-186 mph), 1000m, and top speed challenges, often with a Toyota Supra A80. Nagata famously performed many illegal speed runs on public roads, including 341 km/h (212 mph) on the Autobahn (Germany), 358 km/h (222 mph) on Nardò (Italy) with a Top Secret V12 Supra, and 317 km/h (197 mph) on public roads in the UK. He is well known in the JDM car community and became universally known because of reposted clips on different social media platforms of these illegal high speed runs. Some clips found on YouTube are sourced from "Midnight 200mph Blast" (DVD).

In 2008 at the Nardò Ring in Italy, the Top Secret V12 Supra set a top speed of 222.6 mph, powered by a fully-built 1GZ-FE from the Toyota Century with dual HKS GT2835 ball bearing turbochargers and tuned to 930 hp and 745 lb-ft of torque. One of their most notable complete cars, the Top Secret V12 Supra featured a unique bespoke body kit called the G-Force kit, new headlights, and gold Rays GTF wheels. The body is 33mm wider than stock in the front, and 55mm wider in the rear.

A distinctive feature of many Top Secret-tuned cars is their gold paintwork. However, this finish is reserved exclusively for vehicles that Nagata considers, in his own words, his “best and most accomplished projects".

Top Secret won the 2007 Tokyo Auto Salon Championship with its "Final Evolution" V12 twin turbo Toyota Supra. At the 2017 Tokyo Auto Salon, Top Secret debuted an R32 Nissan Skyline GT-R that had been transplanted with the engine, driveline, and interior of the newer R35 Nissan GT-R. The tuning company dubbed this car the "Skyline VR32 GT-R".

== Motorsport ==
Ryuji Miki won Round 5, and ultimately won the 2004 Japanese D1GP championship in a Nissan Silvia S15 racing for Top Secret. In 2005, Miki won an exhibition round at Silverstone Circuit in the UK in a Nissan Fairlady Z.

In 2007, Yoichi Imamura took 3rd place at Round 3 and 6 at Suzuka and Autopolis respectively. Imamura also won an exhibition round at Las Vegas Motor Speedway the same year.

== Racing results ==
(Japan) Top Secret
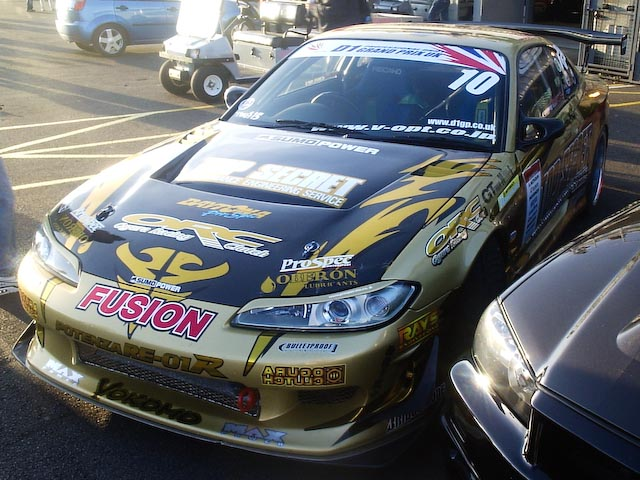
- Founder(s): Kazuhiko “Smoky” Nagata
- Former series: D1GP
- Drivers' Championships: 2 (2004, 2021)

=== D1GP ===
Year	Car	Driver	Drivers' rankings
2002	Nissan Silvia S14	(Japan) Ryuji Miki	28th
2002	Nissan Silvia S15	(Japan) Ryuji Miki	28th
2003	Nissan Silvia S14	(Japan) Ryuji Miki	13th
2004	Nissan Silvia S15	(Japan) Ryuji Miki	1st
2005	Nissan Fairlady Z Z33	(Japan) Ryuji Miki	16th
2006	Nissan Fairlady Z Z33	(Japan) Yoichi Imamura	15th
2007	Nissan Fairlady Z Z33	(Japan) Yoichi Imamura	6th
2021	Nissan Laurel C33	(Japan) Makoto Toda	1st
