= List of highways numbered 355 =

The following highways are numbered 355:

== Canada ==
- Manitoba Provincial Road 355
- New Brunswick Route 355
- Prince Edward Island Route 355
- Saskatchewan Highway 355

== Japan ==
- Japan National Route 355

== United States ==
- Interstate 355
- Arkansas Highway 355
- District of Columbia Route 355
- Georgia State Route 355
  - Georgia State Route 355 Loop (former)
- Kentucky Route 355
- Louisiana Highway 355
- Maryland Route 355
- Mississippi Highway 355
- New York State Route 355
  - New York State Route 355 (former)
- Ohio State Route 355 (former)
- Puerto Rico Highway 355
- Tennessee State Route 355
- Texas:
  - Texas State Highway 355 (former)
  - Texas State Highway Loop 355 (former)
  - Texas Farm to Market Road 355
- Virginia State Route 355
  - Virginia State Route 355 (former)

Preceded by 354	Lists of highways 355	Succeeded by 356
