= Ryuji Miki =

Japanese racing driver

- Nationality: Japan
- Born: 14 June 1975 (age 51) Tottori Prefecture

Formula D career
- Debut season: 2007
- Current team: A'PEXi
- Former teams: Top Secret
- Best finish: 14 in 2005

Previous series
- 2001-2005: D1 Grand Prix

Championship titles
- 2004: 1

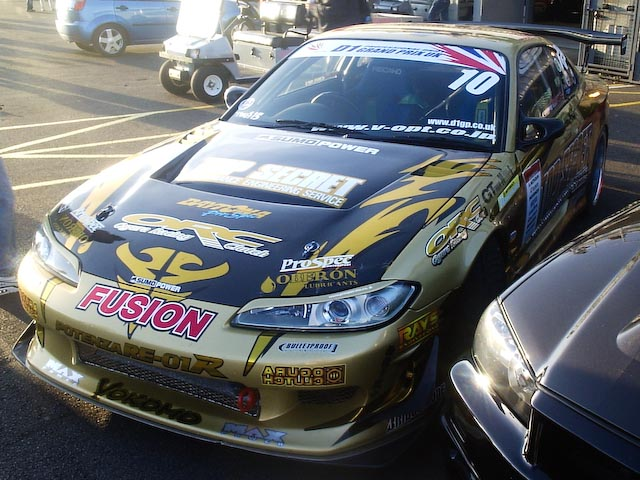
Miki's former car, a Top Secret modified Silvia S15.

Ryuji Miki (三木竜二, Miki Ryuji; 14 June 1975) is a racing and drifting driver from Tottori Prefecture, Japan. Miki was the 2004 D1 Grand Prix champion driving the Top Secret Silvia S15. Miki also competed in the Net'z Cup, a one make series for the Toyota Altezza between 2005 and its final season in 2006 and is nicknamed Doki-Doki kun due to his drifting style.

Miki started in the series in his own S14 Silvia, before switching to the Top Secret modified S15 for the 2002 season. During the 2004 season, partway through the season when Nobuteru Taniguchi switched to the Toyota Altezza, leading to a sudden change of fortune, as many felt that Miki was fortunate as he also managed to get score his sole win at Odaiba, allowing Miki to finish the season with the title that year, beating Taniguchi by 28pts, currently the widest margin of the series.

For the 2005 season, following the opening Irwindale round, Miki switched to a Top Secret modified Fairlady Z Z33 powered by a RB26. He was unable to follow on his successes of the previous season as he only managed to scrape 16 pts. Much of it was, at the time, the Z33 was still in development to be fully competitive in drifting, due to its weight, one of its reason why it befell many of its drivers.

Miki's last win was at the Silverstone exhibition event in his old S15, that year was to be his last season in the series. For the 2006 season, rival Youichi Imamura's team and title sponsor, A'PEXi withdrew from the series due to a redirection in the company's business strategies, leading him to take over Miki's Z33. As of 2007, incidentally, Miki would compete in Formula D driving with Imamura's previous D1 sponsor, APEX'i (partnering with Bergenholtz Racing) and driving a white FD3S.

Throughout the 2007 season, in light of issues he faced with adapting to driving a left hand drive car for the first time, not to mention within a full season of racing, Miki managed to finish the Formula D season impressively. Reaching the rank of top 16 within four events, Ryuji finally adapted to the car within the sixth and seventh rounds finishing 14th overall for the season. Continuing on in 2008 with major backing by Bergenholtz Racing, Nitto Tires, and MAZDA, Ryuji Miki will continue to pilot the APEX RX-7 with plans to potentially unveil a new car for 2009. According to Keith Covey and Chuck Griffice of APEX Integration's R&D department, the new setup on the 2008 car has been completely redone and Miki would be adapting to what essentially amounts to a new car.

== Complete drifting results ==
Colour	Result
Gold	Winner
Silver	2nd place
Bronze	3rd place
Green	Last 4 [Semi-final]
Blue	Last 8 [Quarter-final]
Purple	Last 16 (16) [1st Tsuiou Round OR Tandem Battle] (Numbers are given to indicate Top 10 finish)
Black	Disqualified (DSQ) (Given to indicate that the driver has been stripped of their position through disqualification)
White	First Round (TAN) [Tansou OR Qualifying Single Runs]
Red	Did not qualify (DNQ)

- When driver's position are highlighted in blue, this indicates either the driver earned 100pt or 100pt tansou (solo run) bonus has been awarded, with the latter being in use for Pre-2005.

=== D1 Grand Prix ===
Year	Entrant	Car	1	2	3	4	5	6	7	Position	Points
2001		Nissan Silvia S14	EBS	NIK	BHH; 10	EBS; TAN	NIK; 10			21st	4
2002	Top Secret	Nissan Silvia S14	BHH; TAN							28th	6
2002	Top Secret	Nissan Silvia S15		EBS; 8	SGO; DNQ	TKB; DNQ	EBS; TAN	SEK; DNQ	NIK; TAN	28th	6
2003	Top Secret	Nissan Silvia S15	TKB; DNQ	BHH; 5	SGO; 16	FUJ; TAN	EBS; 16	SEK; 9	TKB; 9	13th	20
2004	Top Secret	Nissan Silvia S15	IRW; 5	SGO; 4	EBS; 4	APS; 3	ODB; 1	EBS; 2	TKB; 3	1st	110
2005	Top Secret/ORC	Nissan Fairlady Z Z33	IRW; 9	ODB; 6	SGO	APS; DNQ	EBS; 16	FUJ; DNQ	TKB; 16	16th	16

=== Formula D ===
Year	Entrant	Car	1	2	3	4	5	6	7	Position	Points
2007	A'PEXi	Mazda RX-7 FD	Rd. 1	Rd. 2	Rd. 3	Rd. 4	Rd. 5	Rd. 6	Rd. 7	14	240.75

Year	Entrant	Car	Rd.1	Rd.2	Rd.3	Rd.4	Rd.5	Rd.6	Rd.7	Position	Points
2008	A'PEXi	Mazda RX-7 FD	55 pts	.25 pts	604 pts	.25 pts	64 pts	TBA	TBA	11th	183.50

== Notes ==
Preceded by Youichi Imamura	D1 Grand Prix Champion; 2004	Succeeded by Yasuyuki Kazama
