= Harumi Route =

Expressway in the Greater Tokyo area

Shuto Expressway Harumi Route 首都高速10号晴海線

Route information
- Maintained by Metropolitan Expressway Company Limited
- Length: 2.7 km (1.7 mi)
- Existed: 2009–present

Major junctions
- South end: Shinonome Junction in Kōtō-ku; Bayshore Route
- North end: Harumi entrance/exit in Chūō-ku; Tokyo Metropolitan Route 304

Location
- Country: Japan

Highway system
- National highways of Japan; Expressways of Japan

The Harumi Route, signed as Route 10, is one of the routes of the Shuto Expressway system in the Greater Tokyo Area. The 2.7-kilometer (1.7 mi) long radial expressway runs northwest from the Shinonome Junction (with the Bayshore Route) in Kōtō-ku and ends at Harumi in Chūō-ku.

== History ==
The expressway between Shinonome and Toyosu opened to traffic on 11 February 2009, and currently consists of a single lane in each direction. A 1.2 km-long extension from Toyosu to Harumi opened on 10 March 2018.

== List of interchanges and features ==
No.	Exit/Junction Name	Connections	Notes	Location (all in Tokyo)
1002	Harumi		Northbound exit and southbound entrance only	Chūō-ku
1004	Toyosu		Northbound exit and southbound entrance only	Kōtō-ku
JCT	Shinonome JCT	Shuto Expressway Bayshore Route to Urayasu and Yokohama		Kōtō-ku
