= Japan National Route 130 =

National highway in Japan

National Route 130
- 国道130号
- Kyukaigan-dori
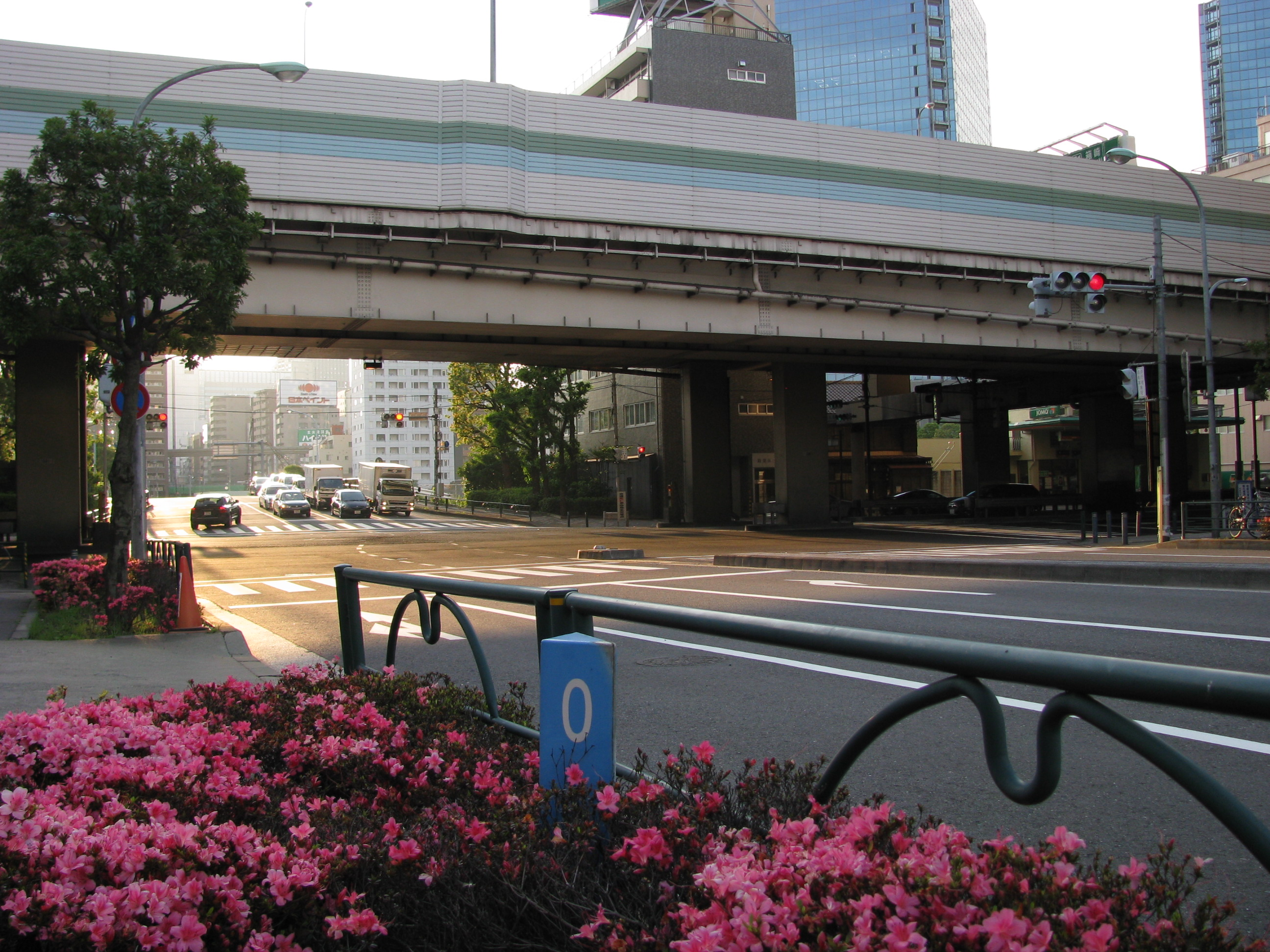

Route information
- Length: 0.5 km (0.31 mi; 1,600 ft)
- Existed: 1953–present

Major junctions
- East end: Port of Tokyo
- West end: National Route 15 in Minato, Tokyo

Location
- Country: Japan

Highway system
- National highways of Japan; Expressways of Japan
← National Route 129	→ National Route 131

National Route 130 (国道130号, kokudō hyakusanjū-gō) is a national highway connecting Port of Tokyo and Route 15 in Tokyo, Japan. With a length of 0.5 kilometers (0.31 mi), it is the second shortest national highway in Japan behind Japan National Route 174.

== Route data ==
- Length: 0.5 km
- Origin: Port of Tokyo
- Terminus: Minato, Tokyo (ends at Junction with Route 15)

== History ==
- 1953-05-18 – Second Class National Highway 130 from Port of Tokyo to intersection with Route 15)
- 1965-04-01 – General National Highway 130 from Port of Tokyo to intersection with Route 15)
