= List of highways numbered 356 =

The following highways are numbered 356:

== Canada ==
- Prince Edward Island Route 356

== Japan ==
- Japan National Route 356

== United States ==
- Arkansas Highway 356
- County Road 356 (Leon County, Florida)
- Georgia State Route 356
- Indiana State Road 356
- Kentucky Route 356
- Maryland Route 356 (former)
- New York State Route 356 (former)
- Ohio State Route 356
- Pennsylvania Route 356
- Puerto Rico Highway 356
- Tennessee State Route 356
- Texas State Highway 356
- Virginia State Route 356

Preceded by 355	Lists of highways 356	Succeeded by 357
