= List of highways numbered 357 =

The following highways are numbered 357:

== Canada ==
- Manitoba Provincial Road 357
- Nova Scotia Route 357
- Prince Edward Island Route 357
- Saskatchewan Highway 357

== Japan ==
- Japan National Route 357

== United States ==
- Arkansas Highway 357
- Georgia State Route 357 (former)
- Indiana State Road 357
- Maryland Route 357 (former)
- New York State Route 357
  - New York State Route 357 (former)
- Ohio State Route 357
- Puerto Rico Highway 357
- South Carolina Highway 357
- Tennessee State Route 357
- Texas State Highway 357
- Virginia State Route 357
  - Virginia State Route 357 (former)

Preceded by 356	Lists of highways 357	Succeeded by 358
