= Japan National Route 359 =

Road in Japan

National Route 359
- 国道359号

Route information
- Length: 56.2 km (34.9 mi)

Location
- Country: Japan

Highway system
- National highways of Japan; Expressways of Japan
← National Route 358	→ National Route 360

National Route 359 is a national highway of Japan connecting Toyama, Toyama and Kanazawa, Ishikawa in Japan, with a total length of 56.2 km (34.92 mi).
