= K-360 (Kansas highway) =

State highway in Kansas, U.S.

K-360

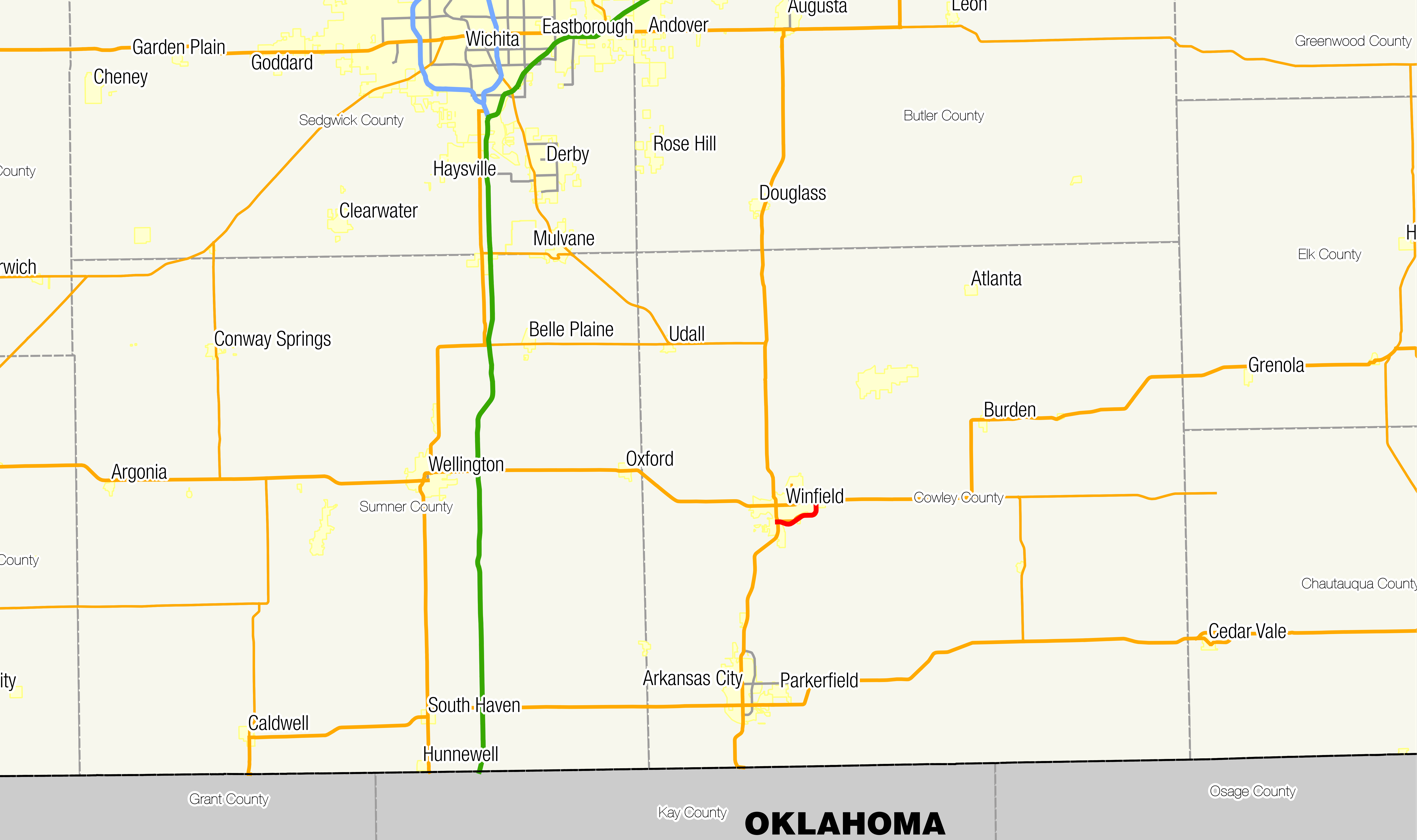

Route information
- Maintained by KDOT
- Length: 3.469 mi (5.583 km)
- Existed: 1997–present

Major junctions
- West end: US-77 in Winfield
- East end: US-160 in Winfield

Location
- Country: United States
- State: Kansas
- Counties: Cowley

Highway system
- Kansas State Highway System; Interstate; US; State; Spurs
← K-285	→ K-368

K-360 is a state highway in Cowley County, Kansas, United States. It follows a route around the south and east sides of Winfield. The highway was established in 1997. It starts at US-77 in southern Winfield and proceeds east and north for 3.469 miles (5.583 km), ending at US-160 in eastern Winfield. (Although the route begins and ends in Winfield, it passes several times in and out of the city limits.)

== Route description ==
K-360 starts at an intersection with U.S. Route 77 in southern Winfield. From there, the highway heads east, curves slightly south, then heads northeast along the south side of Winfield for a total of 1.571 miles (2.528 km) to an intersection with Wheat Road. After the intersection with Wheat Road the highway curves gently due east and then due north around the southeast side of Winfield, then continues north along the east side of Winfield a further 0.5 miles (0.80 km) to its terminus with U.S. Route 160.

K-360 is not a part of the United States National Highway System. The highway connects to the National Highway System at its intersection with U.S. Route 77. The western sections of the highway are more traveled than the eastern sections, with an annual average daily traffic of 2235 on the first one mile (1.6 km) of the route, 1703 on the next one mile (1.6 km), and 1179 on the final 1.469 miles (2.364 km) of the route. The entirety of K-360's route is paved with Portland cement concrete pavement.

== History ==
K-360 first appeared on the State of Kansas highway maps in 1997. The routing of K-360 has remained unchanged.

== Major intersections ==
The entire route is in Cowley County.

Location	mi	km	Destinations	Notes
Winfield	0.000	0.000	US-77 – Hackney, Arkansas City, Douglass	Western terminus
Winfield	3.469	5.583	US-160 – Oxford, Burden	Eastern terminus
1.000 mi = 1.609 km; 1.000 km = 0.621 mi

== See also ==
- List of state highways in Kansas
- List of highways numbered 360
