= Ohio State Route 357 =

State highway in Ottawa County, Ohio, US

State Route 357

- A red line indicating the path of SR 357

Route information
- Maintained by ODOT
- Length: 2.353 mi (3.787 km)
- Existed: 1934–present

Major junctions
- West end: West Shore Boulevard near Put-in-Bay
- East end: Dead end near Lake Erie

Location
- Country: United States
- State: Ohio
- Counties: Ottawa

Highway system
- Ohio State Highway System; Interstate; US; State; Scenic
← SR 356	→ SR 358

State Route 357 (SR 357) is a 2.353-mile-long (3.787 km) east–west state highway in the northern portion of U.S. state of Ohio. Existing entirely on South Bass Island in Lake Erie, the highway begins at its western terminus of West Shore Boulevard, about 0.75 miles (1.21 km) west of Put-in-Bay. SR 357 then travels northeast to its eastern terminus at a dead end at Lake Erie, approximately 2 miles (3.2 km) east of Put-in-Bay Village.

SR 357 is one of two Ohio state routes on Lake Erie islands (the other being SR 575). SR 357 once extended to the mainland of Ohio via the Catawba Island ferry. It officially carries a north–south routing, but a single reassurance marker along the route displays "west" instead of "south".

== Route description ==
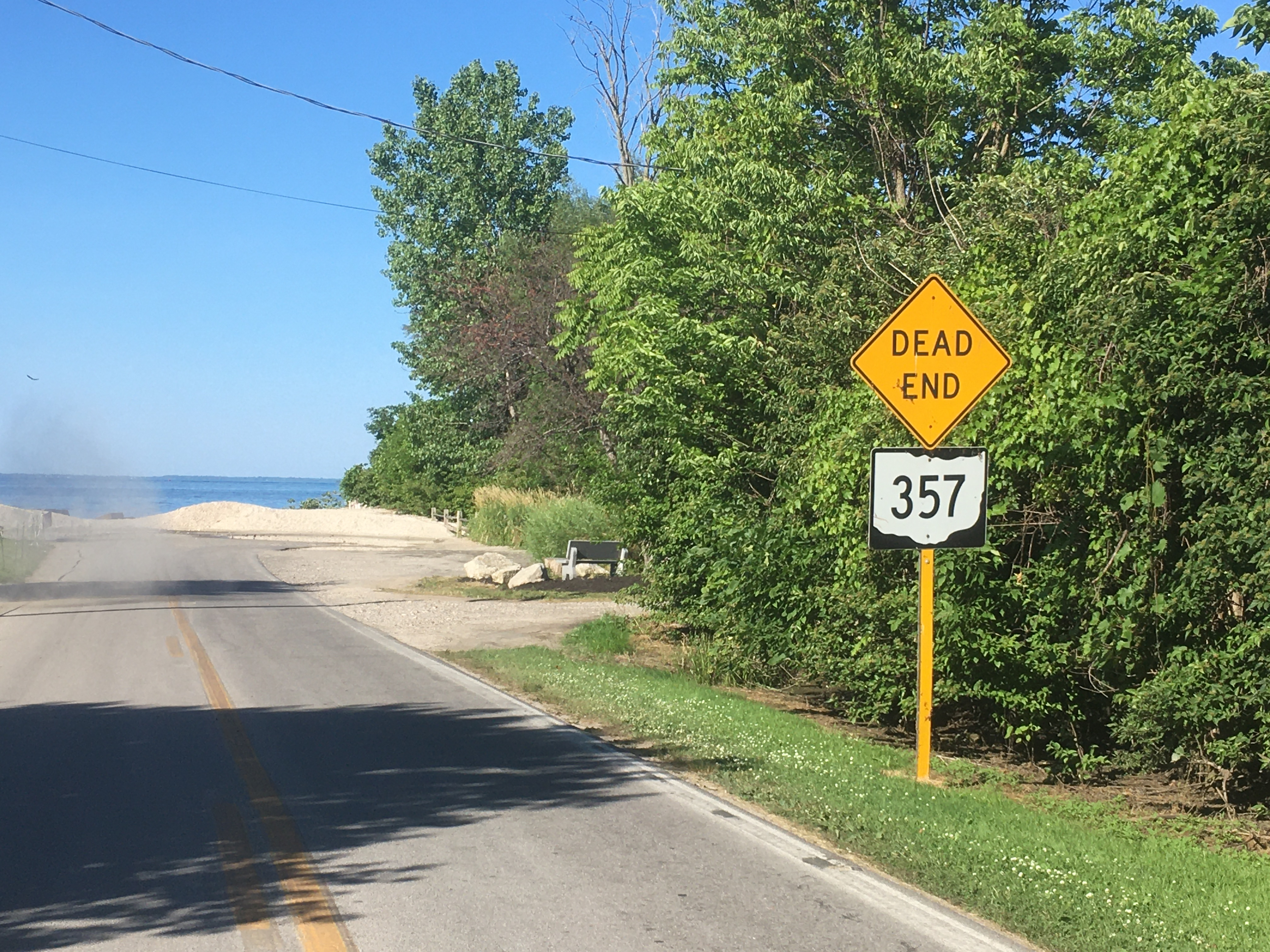
Eastern terminus of SR 357

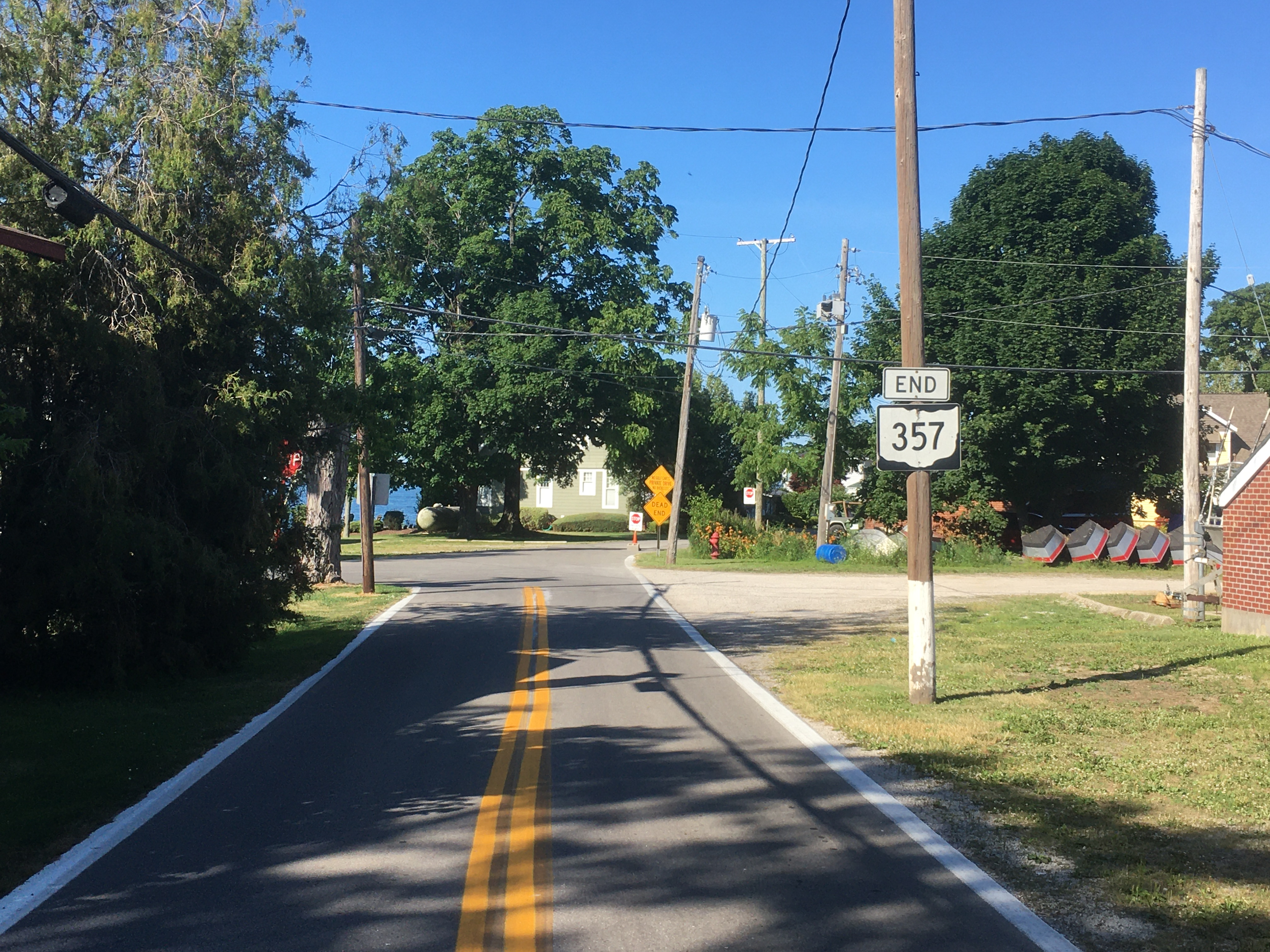
Western terminus of SR 357

The entirety of SR 357 exists within the confines of South Bass Island in Lake Erie. It is located within Put-in-Bay Township in Ottawa County. In 2012, between 490 and 590 vehicles travel on the road on average each day. SR 357 begins at West Shore Boulevard, and travels southwestward. The route passes by Oak Point State Park, and becomes part of Bayview Avenue. SR 357 then intersects County Route 163, which leads to the Put-in-Bay Airport, and the Put-in-Bay–Catawba Island ferry. The route later leaves Put-in-Bay, near Perry's Victory and International Peace Memorial. SR 357 turns northeast to Columbus Avenue, and later ends at a dead end near the lake, next to a driveway.

== History ==
The SR 357 designation was created in 1934. At the time, the highway was routed along the entirety of its present alignment on South Bass Island. However, in 1946, when SR 53 was extended northerly from Port Clinton to end at its present northern terminus in Catawba Island, SR 357 was simultaneously extended south onto the mainland via the ferry that connects Put-in-Bay with Catawba Island, then south along SR 53 to a new southern terminus at SR 2 east of Port Clinton. By 1969, all of the 1946 extension of SR 357 was eliminated, with the Put-in-Bay–Catawba Island ferry becoming a connector between the southern end of SR 357 and the northern endpoint of SR 53, and the mainland portion of SR 357 becoming just SR 53. By 1973, the Put-in-Bay–Catawba Island ferry docked on the south side of South Bass Island, ending the direct access to ferry docks and the rest of the state highway system from SR 357.

== Major intersections ==
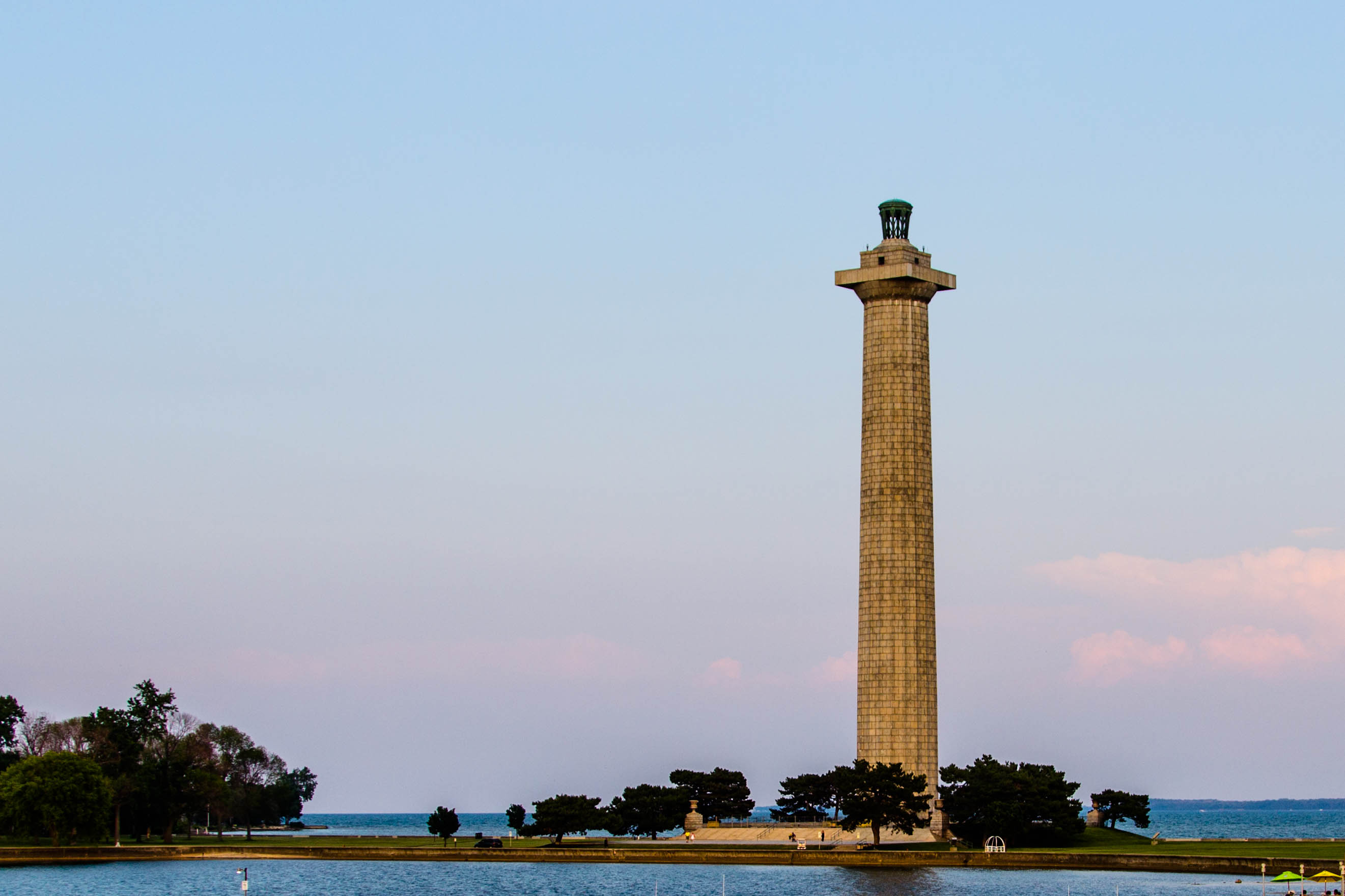
Perry's Victory and International Peace Memorial near SR 357

The entire route is in Ottawa County.

Location	mi	km	Destinations	Notes
Portage Township			SR 2 / SR 53	Southern terminus from 1946 to 1969
Catawba Island Township			SR 53	Former concurrency terminus
Lake Erie				
Put-in-Bay Township	0.000	0.000	TR 270 (West Shore Boulevard)	Southern terminus
Put-in-Bay	1.018	1.638	CR 163 (Toledo Avenue)	
Put-in-Bay Township	2.353	3.787	Lake Erie	Northern terminus at a dead end
1.000 mi = 1.609 km; 1.000 km = 0.621 mi: Closed/former
