= Megalopolis Expressway Trial =

Series of six Japanese films about illegal highway racing

首都高速トライアル Megalopolis Expressway Trial Freeway Speedway
- "The Complete Collection" DVD boxset
- Directed by: Freeway Speedway: Katsuji Kanazawa; Freeway Speedway 2: Shūji Kataoka; Freeway Speedway 3: Yoshihiro Tsukada; Freeway Speedway 4: Yoshihiro Tsukada; Freeway Speedway 5: Yoshihiro Tsukada; Freeway Speedway 6: -
- Starring: Keiichi Tsuchiya; Gitan Ōtsuru; Yumiko Okayasu; Daisuke Nagakura; Arthur Kuroda; Kazuhiko Nishimura; Ikuo Fukada; Toshihiko Sakakibara; Keika Miyamoto; Masaki Nishimori; Wataru Watanabe
- Distributed by: Toei (Japan); Nikkatsu (Japan); Adness Entertainment (U.S.)
- Country: Japan
- Language: Japanese

Megalopolis Expressway Trial (首都高速トライアル, Shuto kōsoku toraiaru) is the original title of a series of six Japanese films, about illegal highway racing in the Shuto Expressway, released between 1988 and 1996. An English subtitled version of the film series (renamed Freeway Speedway) was released on DVD in North America in 2004 due to commercial success of popular Hollywood films like The Fast and The Furious ("before there was The Fast And The Furious, there was Freeway Speedway" is a quote appearing on the fourth DVD). A 4-disc re-release of the 2004 edition was made available in 2007, it was renamed Tokyo Speedway: The Complete Collection. Though also available in Hong Kong, the DVD edition was not released in Japan since the series is still banned and the last episode unreleased yet.

== Background ==
Made during one of the most notorious eras of street racing, when the Mid Night Club ruled the scene and became one of the most infamous and feared or respected car clubs in Japan. Before they were banned from doing so, car magazines freely covered illegal races, but in the mid 1990s, Western media started to report about the Bōsōzoku and in the 2000s a popular American street racing video game series was named after them, as Midnight Club.

The first film, produced by Nikkatsu, was banned from release in Japan in cinema, due to its content. When racing driver and former street racer Keiichi Tsuchiya came on hand from the first sequel, it had adopted an anti street racing message, therefore avoiding a ban. The series became a semi biographical piece about him, partially about his experience as a hashiriya (native term for "street racer") and that when he quit to go professional racing.

The series following the first film, were released under the Toei Company's V-Cinema line, meaning that they were all released direct-to-video. These films are believed to have influenced popular franchises including local video game series such as the Ridge Racer series and the Shutokō Battle series (the name "shutokō battle" is a dialogue line in the fourth film), as well as manga such as Wangan Midnight.

It was also a source of inspiration for Hong Kong cinema's Legend of Speed and western video games like the Midnight Club series as well Hollywood films such as The Fast and the Furious.

== Plot summary ==
=== Megalopolis Expressway Trial (1988) ===
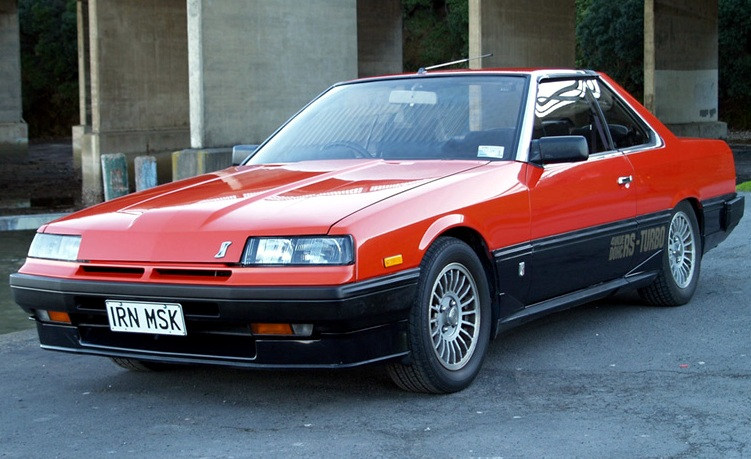
Skyline RS-Turbo (R30)

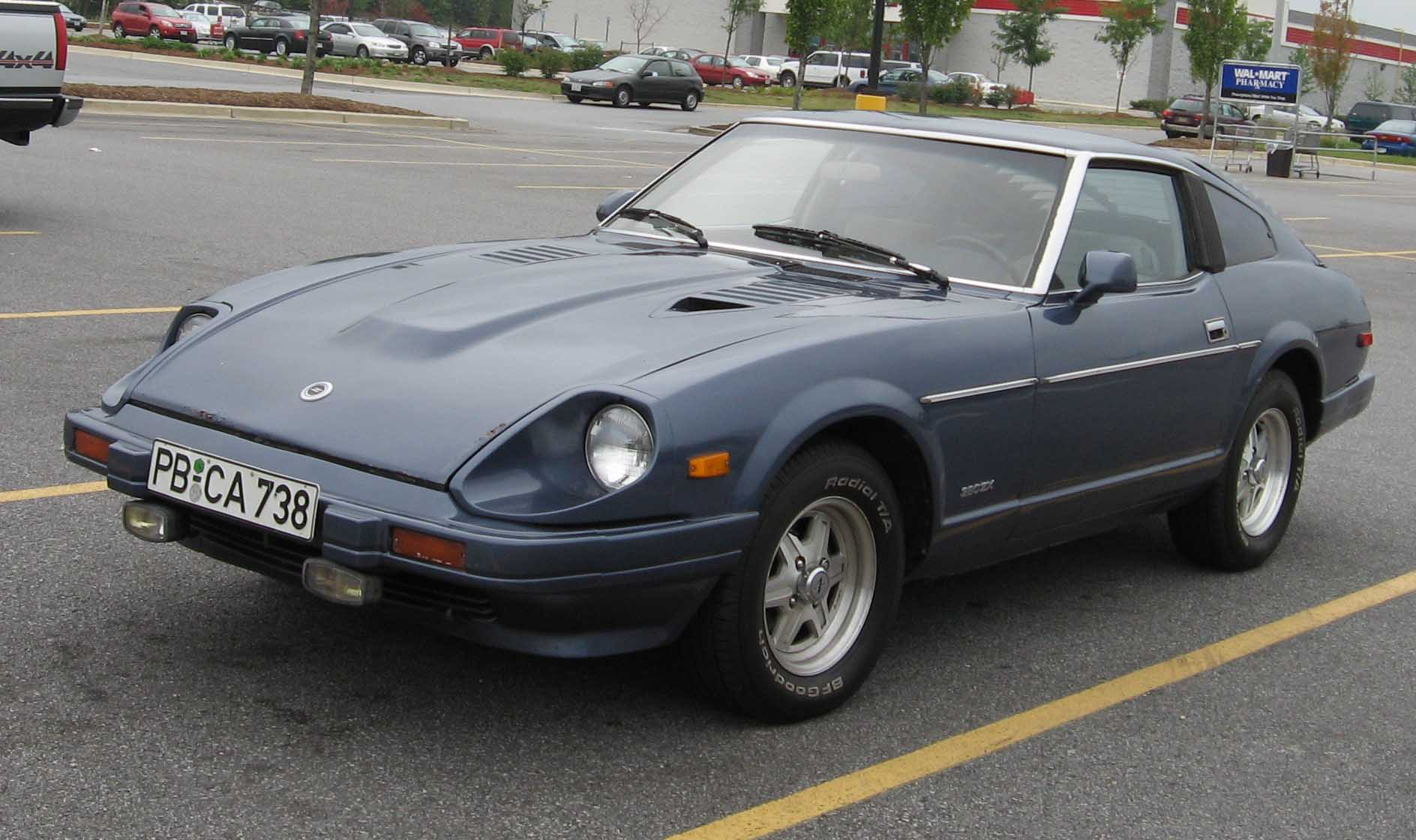
Fairlady Z (S130)

Street racers challenge each other to exceed the current speed record held by the F1 racer. However, in order to break the record of the Shuto Expressway, you need to have "luck" in addition to a high-powered street-machine and driving technique. And you must be able to conquer "Devil's Curve". Racers bet their dreams and their lives against one another in a dangerous game of speed. The 1st movie of the series and the only one which involves Police car chase.

This movie was banned from Japanese theaters due to its message, nevertheless the series followed in video releases.

=== Megalopolis Expressway Trial 2 (1990) ===
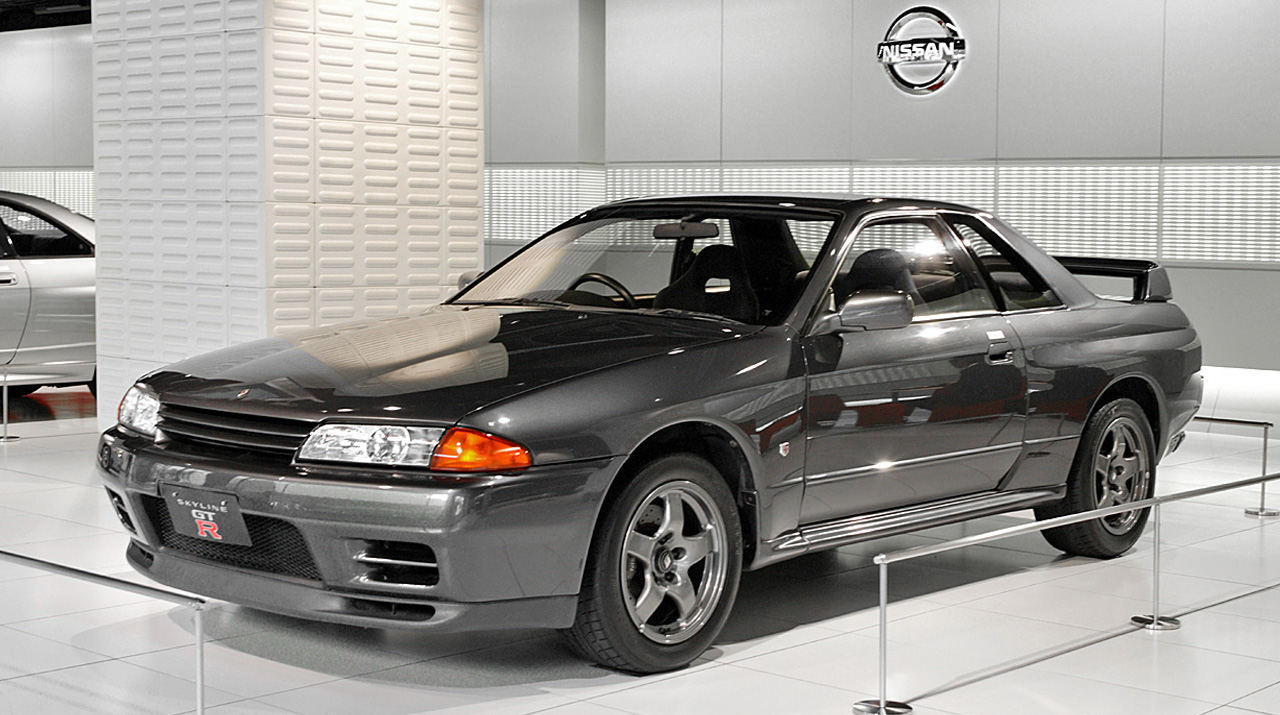
Skyline GT-R (R32)

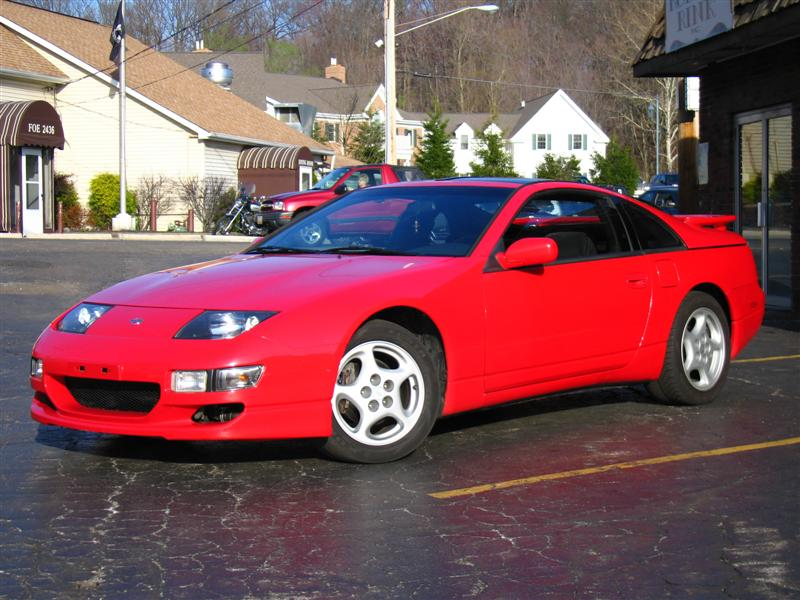
Fairlady Z (Z32)

Keiichi Tsuchiya (Skyline GT-R (R32)) tests tyres on a race track. Yamanaka Takahiro (Silvia K's (S13)) breaks the street course record of his friend Toshiro Junichi (Skyline RS-X (R30)). Junichi has given up racing to get married. The villain Sawaki (Fairlady Z (Z32)) challenges Taka to a race. Junichi intervenes, stopping Taka from accepting. Taka sees Keiichi outside a Nissan showroom and challenges him to a race. Keiichi says he no longer races on the street, and he will only challenge Taka on a track. Junichi later races Sawaki on the condition that he leaves Taka alone. Junichi crashes and dies in this race. Junichi's fiancee had bought a Skyline GT-R (R32) as a wedding present, and gives this to Taka, on condition he never street races again. Taka practices in the GT-R, receiving pointers from Keiichi Tsuchiya. Breaking his promise to Junichi's fiancee he also races Sawaki, but during the race, having already dominated Sawaki, he decides racing is futile and doesn't bother to finish. The movie ends with the GT-Rs of Keiichi and Taka chasing each other around a race track. Takahiro, overtakes Tsuchiya, in the final corner of the race, with Nozomi, Junichi's widow, waving the checkered flag as they cross the finish line.

- Opening theme: Me-ga subete (目がすべて) by Saori Saitō off her album Lady (1989).
- Ending theme: Naga-denwa no ballad (長電話のバラード) by Saori Saitō off her album Lady (1989).

=== Megalopolis Expressway Trial 3 (1991) ===
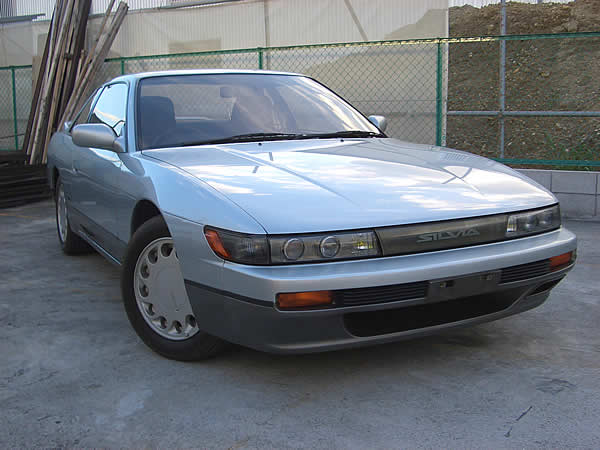
Silvia K's (S13)

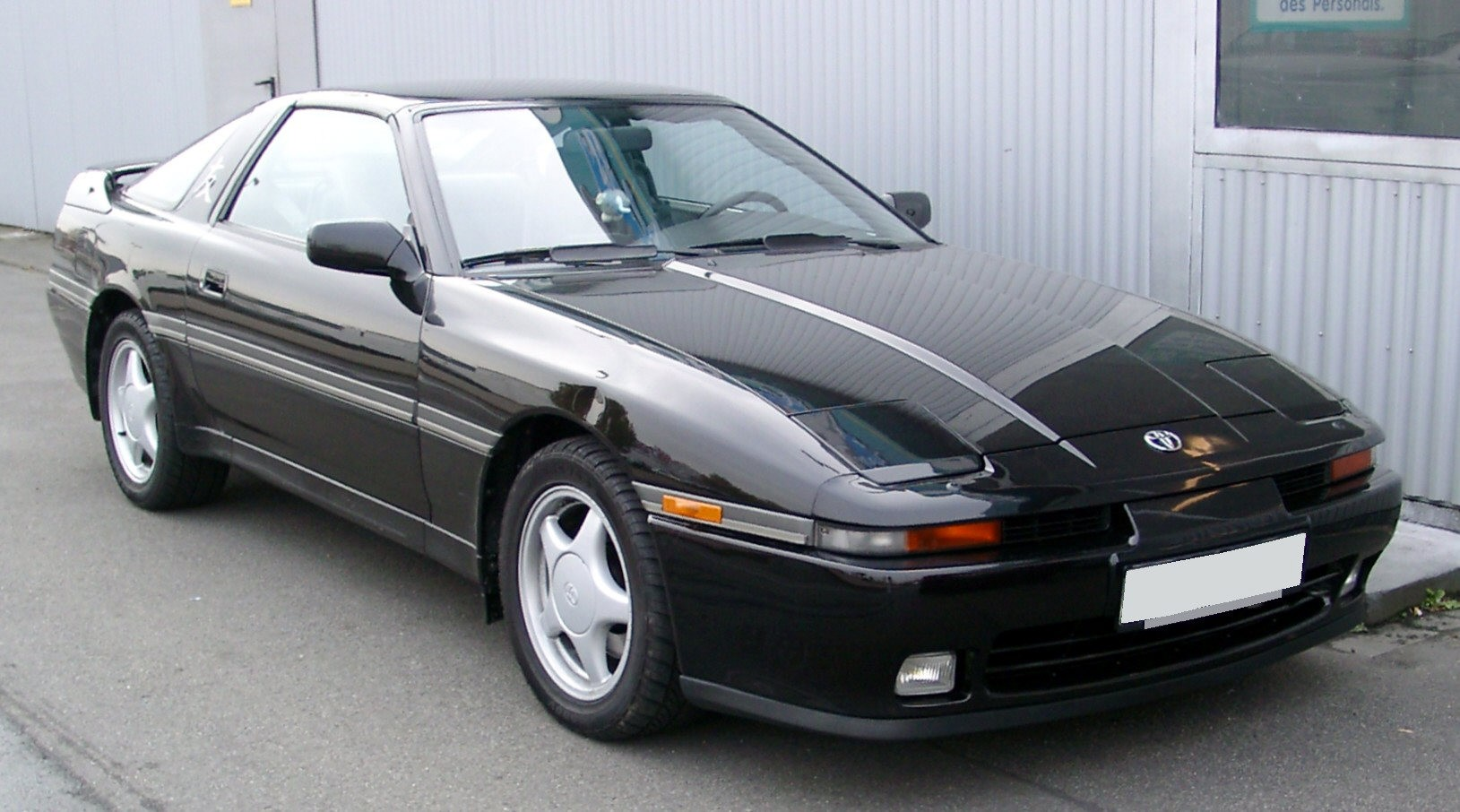
Supra Twin Turbo R (JZA70)

Former Megalopolis Express Freeway record holder Kyōhei has retired from street racing and now belongs to Keiichi Tsuchiya's racing team. One day while performing mountain time trials, a black Toyota Supra (JZA70) hiding inside a tunnel comes from behind and challenges Yūsuke (S13) to a race, but Yūsuke is no match for the unknown Black Supra. Kyōhei is still haunted by that devastating crash that occurred on the Expressway a few years ago, which caused him to leave street racing. One day while releasing his anger in the snowy mountains, he and Tsuchiya witnessed an accident resulting Tsuchiya (R32) racing down the snowy mountains to get help. After witnessing this, Kyōhei asked Yūsuke to quit street racing in which the later replied that beating his record was the only thing for him. When Kyōhei hears his old rival, Yūsuke has crashed on the freeway while racing the unknown Supra, permanently blinding himself in the process, Kyōhei (R32) returns to the Megalopolis Express Freeway for one last street race to avenge Yūsuke. Towards the end of the race against black Supra, Kyōsuke learn that the casualty in the accident at beginning was the sister of the Supra driver, Miyuki and pulls out from the race. Kyōhei waited for the Black Supra and vows never to race on the streets again, so did the black Supra. After Kyōhei went back to the racing garage, someone gave him a racing helmet. The Last scene shows Kyōhei in number 82 Formula 3000 car getting 6th in his debut to the pro racing scene.

• The film's runtime is approximately 1 hour.

• MAHARA's "Crying All Night" is heard during a race in the film.

=== Megalopolis Expressway Trial 4 (1992) ===
A boy named Keiichi has been diagnosed with terminal cancer. His most favorite car is the Skyline GT-R (BNR32). His only wish was to become a professional driver, like his idol Keiichi Tsuchiya. His older brother, Toshihiko sells not only his car (Silvia K's (S13), but also his father's car as well, in order to buy a Red GT-R (BNR32). Toshihiko chose to race on the streets because he knows his brother Keiichi won't be able to see it by the time he went pro. One day while visiting the tracks, the little boy happened to bump into Tsuchiya and was taken for a ride. As the younger brother's condition becomes worse, and on his deathbed, he makes his older brother promise to become a professional driver and to beat Tsuchiya in a race. During the movie, several side racing action evolves, including a white RX-7 (FC3S) versus a yellow 180SX (RS13), as well as the black Supra Twin Turbo R (JZA70), which was beaten by the red GT-R (BNR32) by a margin in the 0-400m (Zero-Yon) street drag race, and making the latest tuning magazine cover. The man who owns the white RX-7 (FC3S), Akira, later asked whether he was refused by Takahiro Yamanaka to race on the streets and challenged the Red GT-R (BNR32) to race on Shuto Expressway, saying 0-400m are for kids, asking him to create their own legend. Later the two crashed and ended up in the hospital. Takahiro Yamanaka, from the second film in the series, makes a special guest appearance as the mechanic who tunes the cars for the final race and as the trainer to Toshihiko, preparing him for the upcoming battle against Tsuchiya on the race track.

=== Megalopolis Expressway Trial 5: Final Battle (1992) ===
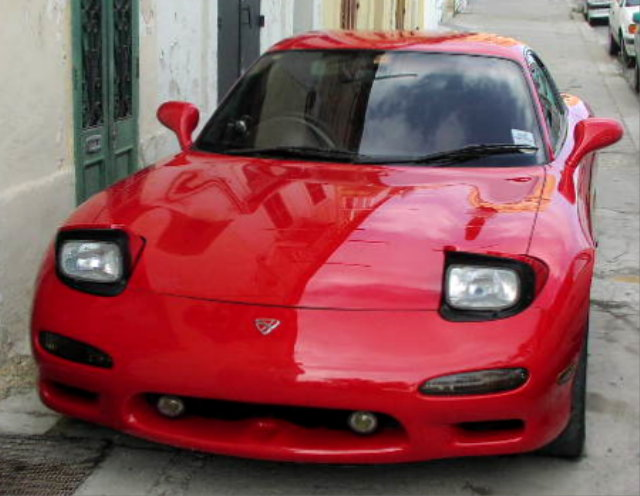
RX-7 (FD)

The story follows street racer Yusuke (Masaki Nishimori) who beats various racers in his white Mazda RX-7 (FC3S). He then challenges another racer named Miyajima in a yellow R32 Nissan Skyline GTR, the result being Yusuke totaling his vehicle. With his hot headed tendencies and causing a strain in his relationship with both his girlfriend Junko (Saori Tsuchiya) and his friend Kurio (Kou Watanabe), he also tries to get Keiichi Tsuchiya to race him but declines as he would only race on the tracks than on the expressways. Along the way he acquires a new red Mazda RX-7 (FD3S) and later has a rematch with Miyajima who inevitably ends up in a fatal accident before the race could finish. Being blamed for inadvertently killing Miyajima, Yusuke looks to redeem himself against Keiichi Tsuchiya, but pesters him further to race on the expressways which results in an altercation. Yusuke finally decides to change his ways and finally gets a chance to race Keiichi on the race track.

• The ending theme is "Time Is Up" by Genda×Benda from their 1992 album "Heroines".

=== Megalopolis Expressway Trial Max (1996, not released in Japan) ===
Shuto Kōsoku champion Shikiba Tatsuya (R33 GT-R) travels to Osaka to challenge Osaka Kanjō (loop) champion Sendō (JZA70 Supra). Sendō crashes during the race, writing off his car, and ending up in hospital. The opening credits roll, featuring Osaka's Tsūtenkaku. Tsuchiya Keiichi (NSX Type R) tells his mechanic Kazuki (also Shikiba's friend) he must give up street racing. Kazuki asks Shikiba to race one last time. Two months pass. Sendō leaves the hospital in his new JZA80 Supra to find Shikiba in Tokyo. Shikiba has given up racing, and spends time looking at the wrecked shell of Kazuki's R33 GT-R. It transpires that Kazuki died during their final race. Sendo finds Shikiba, but Shikiba will not race him, giving him an Akira Sudō ticket as compensation. Akira Sudō's performances are intercut with some of the races/dialogues. Shikiba accepts a final challenge from a Nissan Z32 driver who has also just got out of hospital. When Shikiba passes the spot where Kazuki died he cannot finish the race, and drives to look at Kazuki's GT-R again. He finds Tsuchiya there, who criticises him strongly, and challenges him to race on the track. He races but is no match for Tsuchiya. Tsuchiya tells him street racing is useless, and if he can't make it on the track, he's unfit for the wheel. Shikiba takes to the tōge in anger, and spins. Flashback to Kazuki's death. Shikiba finally returns home two days after the race to find Sendo staying with his sister. They have a fist fight, Shikiba leaves. Flashback showing that Shikiba's R33 GT-R was originally Kazuki's, Shikiba (SW20 MR2) won it from him in a race on their first meeting. Kazuki was so impressed that he asked Shikiba to help him create a legend using the GT-R, defeating all champions on roads across Japan, then moving into professional circuit racing, with Kazuki as the tuner. Flashback ends. Kazuki's bereaved girlfriend Kaoru harasses Shikiba on the docks. Meanwhile, Sendō challenges and defeats the new 300ZX Shuto Kōsoku champion. Tsuchiya and Shikiba's sister independently tell Kaoru that Kazuki's dreams are still important. Kaoru finds Shikiba moping near Kazuki's GT-R and calls him a coward for giving up on Kazuki's dream. She gives him the tuned ROM Kazuki was working on before his death. Shikiba says he will race the Shuto Kousoku one more time. He challenges Sendō. Shikiba and Kaoru prepare the GT-R. Sendo and Shikiba's sister prepare the Supra. During the race, Shikiba finds the car has less power. Eventually he realises the power band has moved higher so adjusts his style and wins. Later he returns to the circuit to find Kaoru and Tsuchiya. While there, Tsuchiya offers Shikiba another race, but declines, saying that he has already raced him, and knows how it's like to race on the track. He then gives Kaoru the GT-R keys saying he will not give up on Kazuki's dream. The GT-R is Kazuki's dream, he feels it should be with Kaoru. Shikiba, is about to leave, but Tsuchiya challenges him for the last time. Sendō and Shikiba's sister turn up to watch. It is evident that Shikiba's sister is now interested in Sendō. Tsuchiya lends Shikiba an NSX, and the movie ends with the NSXs drifting around each other, around the circuit.

• The film's approx. runtime is 1.5 hours.

• Akira Sudou's song "愛が眠れない (Love Can't Sleep)" from her 1996 album "パンドラ (Pandora)" is used midway in the film and during the ending.

== Stunts ==
- The car stunts on police chase sequence of the first film was performed by vehicular stunt specialist, Takahashi Racing.
- The car stunt on the second film was at the time considered the most dangerous car stunt ever performed.

== See also ==
- Shakotan Boogie
- Shuto Expressway
- Wangan Midnight
- Shutokou Battle series
- Import scene
