= Akira Sudou =

Japanese musician

Akira Sudou (須藤 あきら, Sudō Akira; born November 4, 1971) is a Japanese female rock vocalist. She is arguably best known for her work as the vocalist and lyrics writer for SEKIRIA, the band that did the music for the anime series Bubblegum Crisis: Tokyo 2040 and played live in the movie Shuto Kōsoku Max.
