= Japan National Route 358 =

National highway in Japan

National Route 358
- 国道358号
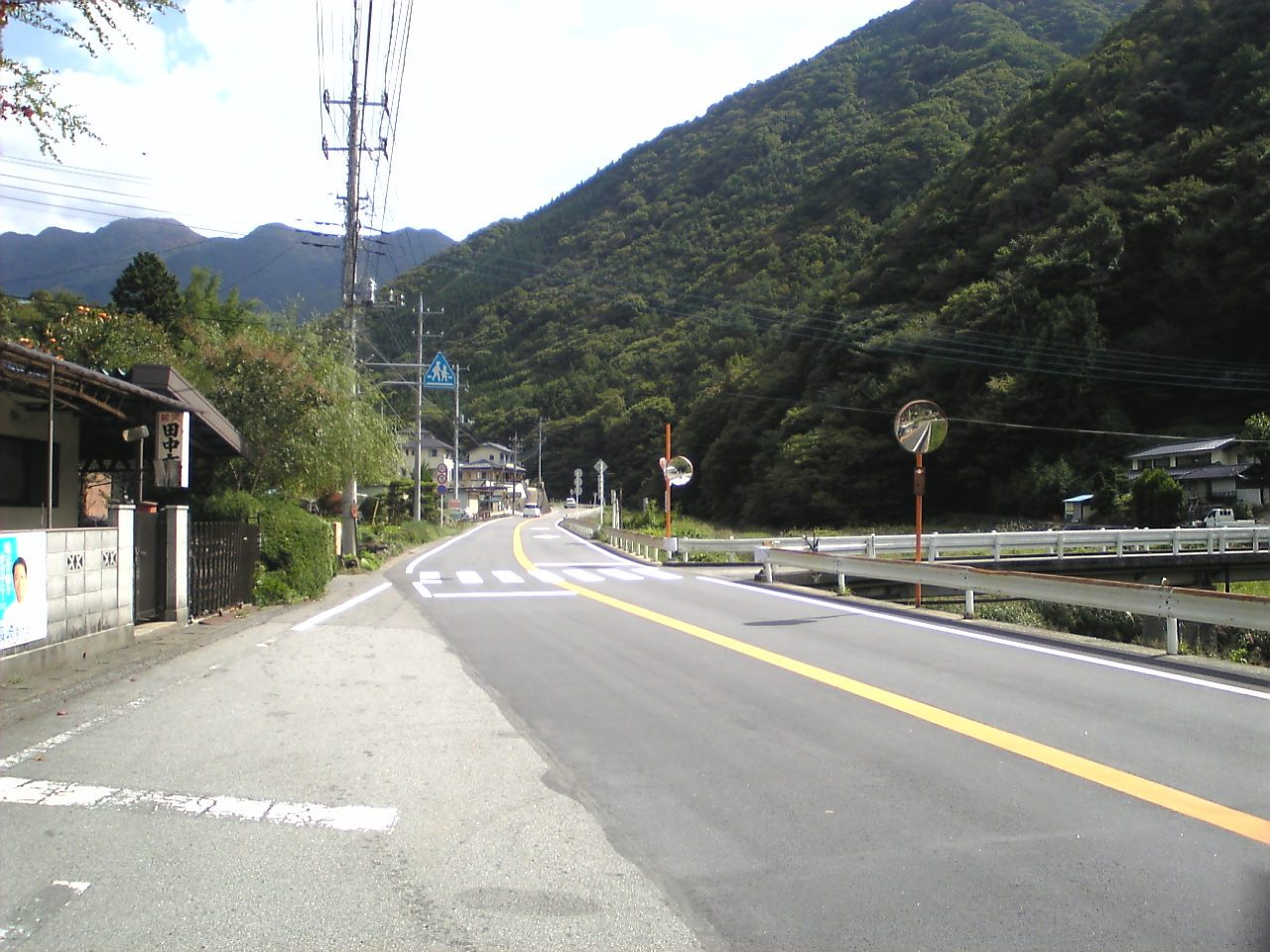

Route information
- Length: 28.5 km (17.7 mi)

Major junctions
- South end: National Route 139 near Fujikawaguchiko, Yamanshi
- Chūō Expressway; National Route 140; National Route 20
- North end: National Route 52 / National Route 411 in Kōfu, Yamanshi

Location
- Country: Japan

Highway system
- National highways of Japan; Expressways of Japan
← National Route 357	→ National Route 359

National Route 358 is a national highway of Japan connecting Fujikawaguchiko, Yamanashi and Kōfu, Yamanashi in Japan, with a total length of 28.5 km (17.71 mi).
