= Ohio State Route 358 =

State highway in Ottawa County, Ohio, US

State Route 358

Route information
- Maintained by ODOT
- Length: 0.92 mi (1,480 m)
- Existed: 1934–present

Major junctions
- South end: SR 163 near Oak Harbor
- North end: SR 2 near Port Clinton

Location
- Country: United States
- State: Ohio
- Counties: Ottawa

Highway system
- Ohio State Highway System; Interstate; US; State; Scenic
← SR 357	→ SR 359

State Route 358 (SR 358) is a 0.92-mile-long (1.48 km) north–south state highway in the northern portion of the U.S. state of Ohio. The southern terminus of SR 358 is at a T-intersection with SR 163 nearly 5.75 miles (9.25 km) east of Oak Harbor, just north of the Portage River. Its northern terminus is at SR 2 at an intersection just outside Camp Perry about three and a half miles (5.6 km) west of Port Clinton.

This two-lane state highway was created in the middle of the 1930s. Throughout its history, the primary purpose of SR 358 has been to provide state highway access to Camp Perry. Today, it also provides access from SR 2 eastbound to SR 163, as well as from SR 163 to SR 2 westbound, as an interchange between the two routes approximately one mile (1.6 km) to the east does not allow for those connections.

== Route description ==
SR 358 exists entirely within Erie Township in the central portion of Ottawa County. It begins at a T-intersection with SR 163 east of Oak Harbor, opposite the Port Clinton Golf Course, which is situated on the north banks of the Portage River. The highway crosses over the Norfolk Southern Railway, and passes by a mix of woods and fields on the short journey up to its endpoint at SR 2, along a multi-lane stretch of the major state route opposite of the main entrance into Camp Perry.

This state highway is not included as a part of the National Highway System.

== History ==
The SR 358 designation was applied in 1934. For two years prior to its numbering, the route existed as an unnumbered state-maintained road. The highway has maintained a brief routing through the central portion of Ottawa County throughout its lifetime. Prior to the mid-2000s decade, SR 358 extended north beyond SR 2 to end at the Camp Perry entrance gate bringing the total mileage of the route to 1.41 miles (2.27 km). In addition, the entire length of SR 358 has been paved since its inception.

== Major intersections ==
The entire route is in Erie Township, Ottawa County.

mi	km	Destinations	Notes
0.00	0.00	SR 163 (West Harbor Road) – Port Clinton, Oak Harbor	
0.92	1.48	SR 2 (West Lakeshore Drive) / LECT	
1.000 mi = 1.609 km; 1.000 km = 0.621 mi
