= List of highways numbered 360 =

The following highways are numbered 360:

== Canada ==
- Manitoba Provincial Road 360
- New Brunswick Route 360
- Newfoundland and Labrador Route 360
- Nova Scotia Route 360
- Quebec Route 360

== Japan ==
- Japan National Route 360

== United Kingdom ==
- A360 road, Devizes, Wiltshire to Salisbury, Wiltshire

== United States ==
- U.S. Route 360
- Arizona State Route 360 (former)
- Arkansas Highway 360
- Georgia State Route 360
- Hawaii Route 360
- K-360 (Kansas highway)
- Maryland Route 360 (former)
- Missouri Route 360
- Nevada State Route 360
- New York:
  - New York State Route 360 (former)
  - County Route 360 (Albany County, New York)
- Ohio State Route 360
- Puerto Rico Highway 360
- Texas:
  - Texas State Highway 360
  - Texas State Highway Loop 360
  - Farm to Market Road 360
- Virginia State Route 360

Preceded by 359	Lists of highways 360	Succeeded by 361
