= Japan National Route 132 =

Road in Kanagawa prefecture, Japan

National Route 132
- 国道132号
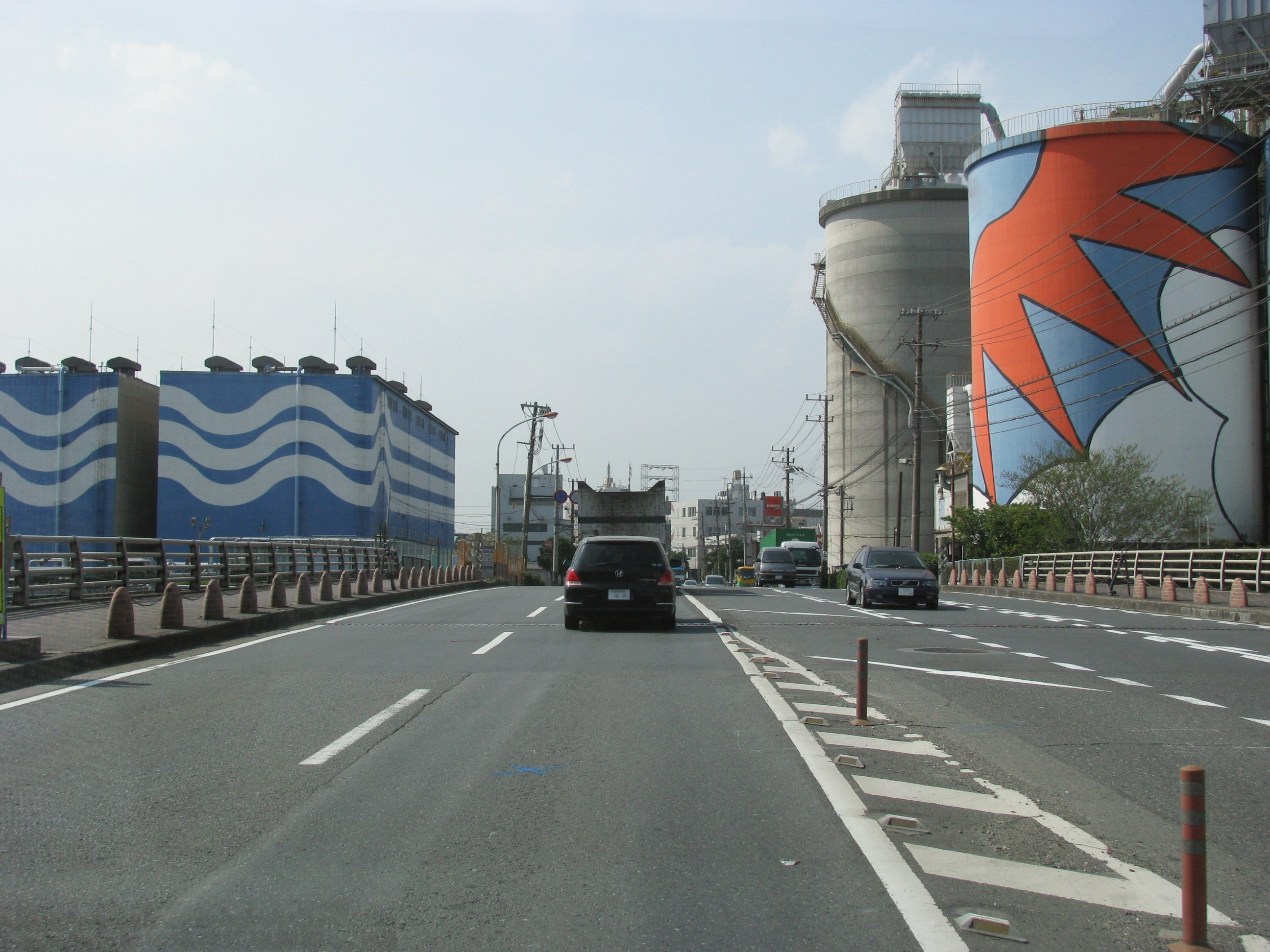

Route information
- Length: 4.5 km (2.8 mi)
- Existed: 1953–present

Major junctions
- East end: Port of Kawasaki
- West end: Kawasaki-ku, Kawasaki

Location
- Country: Japan

Highway system
- National highways of Japan; Expressways of Japan
← National Route 131	→ National Route 133

National Route 132 is a national highway of Japan connecting the Port of Kawasaki and Miyamaechō, Kawasaki-ku, Kawasaki, in Japan, with a total length of 4.5 km (2.8 mi).
