= Japan National Route 357 =

National highway in Japan

National Route 357
- 国道357号
- Tokyo Bay Road
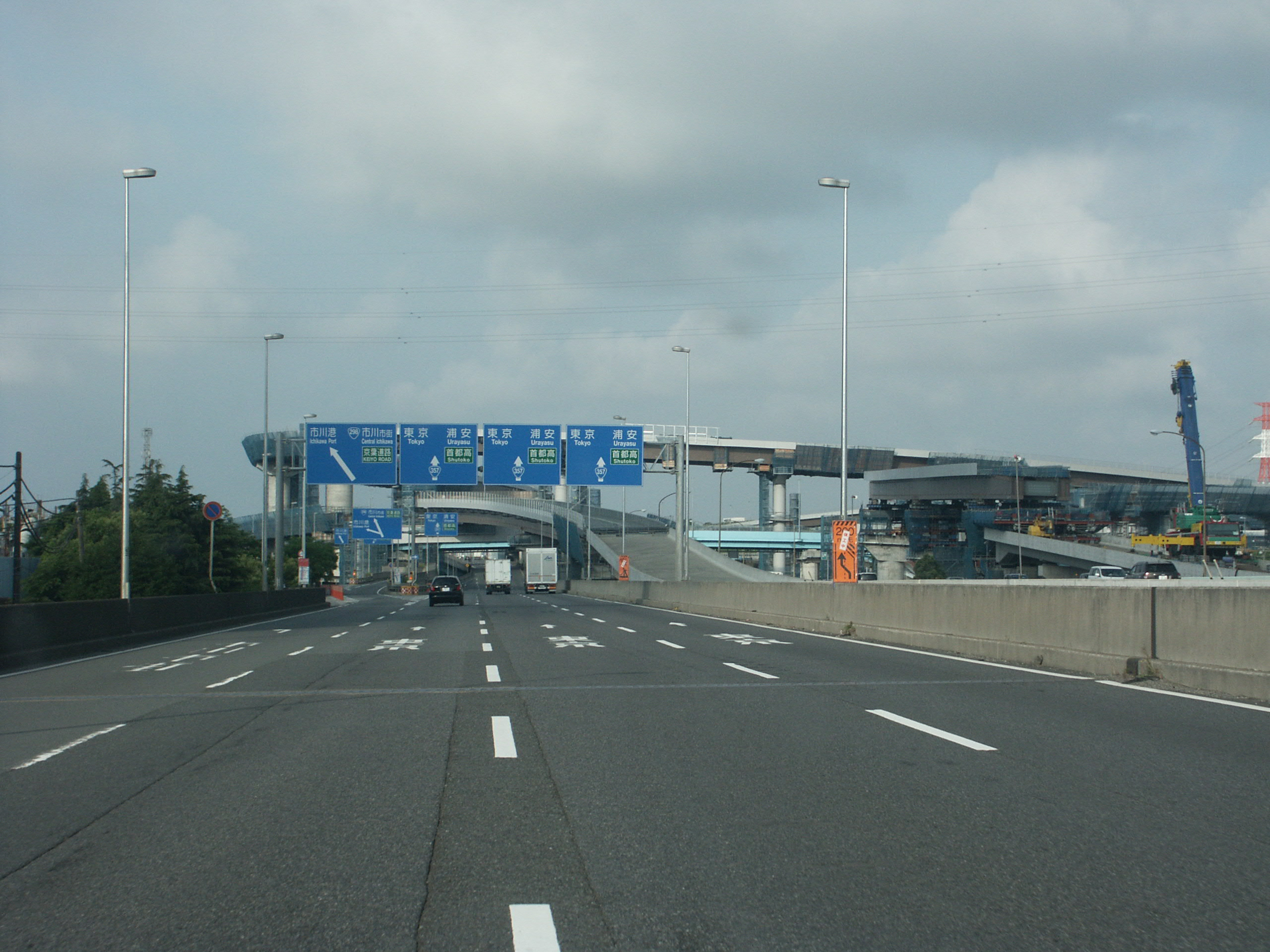
- Route 357 near Ichikawa

Route information
- Length: 70 km (43 mi)
- Existed: 1975–present

Major junctions
- West end: Hakkeijima, Kanagawa (current); Yokosuka (planned)
- National Route 14; Higashi-Kantō Expressway; National Route 298; Bayshore Route
- East end: National Route 16 in Chūō-ku, Chiba

Location
- Country: Japan

Highway system
- National highways of Japan; Expressways of Japan
← National Route 356	→ National Route 358

National Route 357 is a national highway of Japan connecting Chūō-ku, Chiba and Yokosuka in Japan, with a total length of 70 km (43.5 mi). The highway parallels the Bayshore Route.
