= Higashi-Kantō Expressway =

Motorway between Chiba and Ibaraki

Higashi-Kantō Expressway
- 東関東自動車道

Route information
- Length: 74.5 km (46.3 mi)
- Existed: 1971–present

Major junctions
- From: Kōya Junction; Shuto Expressway Bayshore Route; Tokyo Gaikan Expressway in Ichikawa, Chiba
- To: Ibaraki Junction; Kita-Kantō Expressway in Ibaraki, Ibaraki

Location
- Country: Japan
- Major cities: Funabashi, Narashino, Chiba, Sakura, Narita, Katori, Itako

Highway system
- National highways of Japan; Expressways of Japan

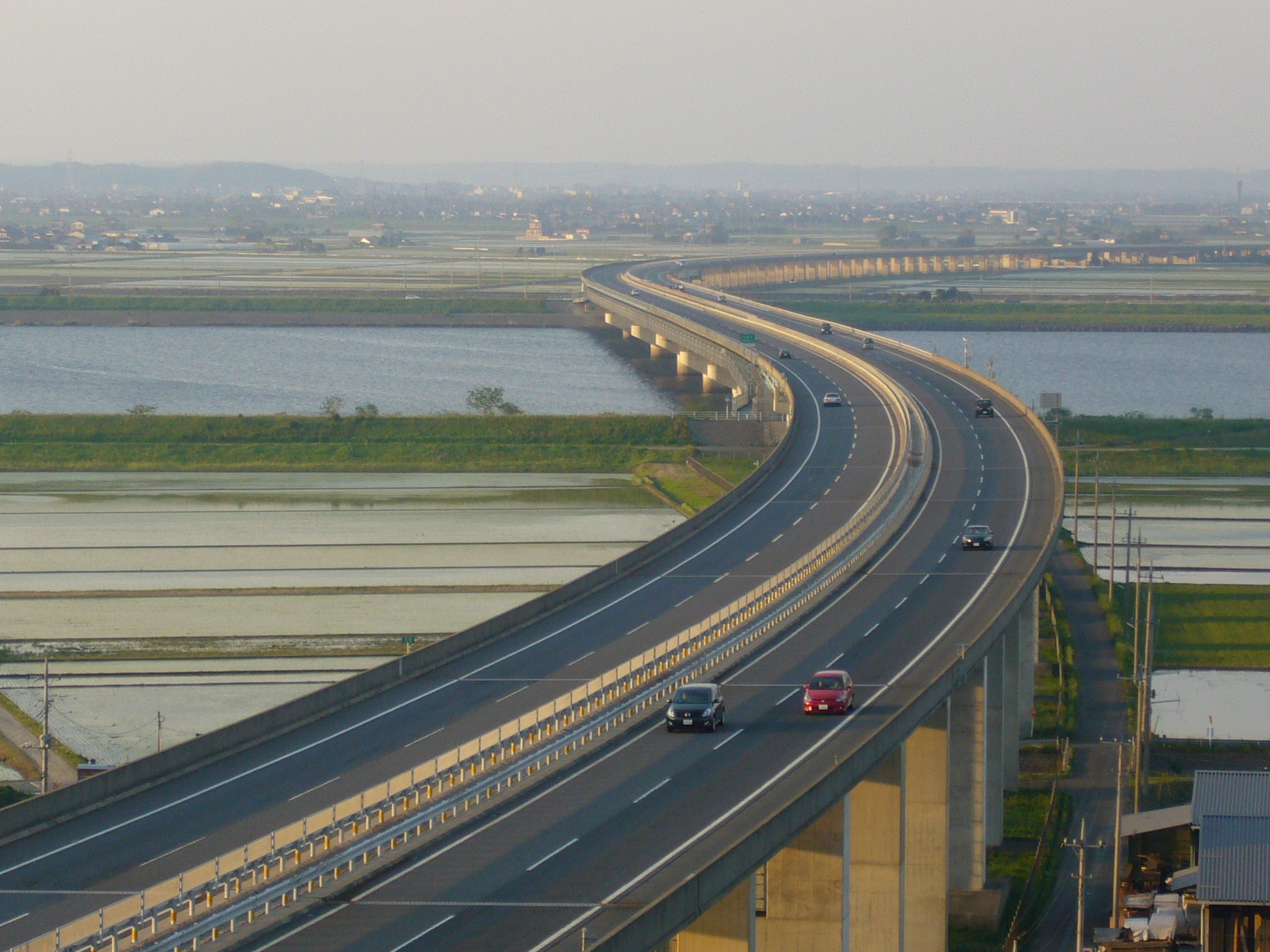
Higashi-Kantō Expressway over the Tone River.

The Higashi-Kantō Expressway (東関東自動車道, Higashi Kantō Jidōsha-dō) (lit. East Kantō Expressway) is a national expressway in Japan. It is owned and operated by East Nippon Expressway Company.

== Overview ==
Officially the expressway is referred to as the Higashi-Kantō Expressway Mito Route.

The expressway commences at a junction with the Shuto Expressway Bayshore Route in western Chiba Prefecture and follows an easterly course which parallels Tokyo Bay. Just before Miyanogi Junction where the expressway meets the Keiyō Road, the route branches away from the bay and heads inland in a northeasterly direction. It continues through Chiba Prefecture, though the city of Narita, and crossing the Tone River into Ibaraki Prefecture where the expressway reaches its current terminus in Itako.

The expressway is an important route linking the greater Tokyo area with Narita International Airport. At Narita Junction travellers must switch to the Shin-Kūkō Expressway to travel the remaining distance to the airport proper.

Currently the expressway extends from Wangan-Ichikawa Interchange to Itako Interchange, however plans are underway to extend the expressway to a junction with the Kita-Kantō Expressway near Mito, Ibaraki.

The expressway is 6 lanes from the origin to Narita Junction, and the remainder is 4 lanes. The speed limit is 80 km/h (50 mph) from the origin to Chiba-kita Interchange, 110 km/h (68 mph) from Yotsukaidō Interchange to Narita Interchange, and other sections are 100 km/h (62 mph).

== List of interchanges and features ==
- IC - interchange, JCT - junction, PA - parking area, SA - service area, BR - bridge, TB - toll gate

No.	Name	Connections	Dist. from Origin	Dist. from Terminus	Notes	Location	
Through to Shuto Expressway Bayshore Route
	Ichikawa JCT		0.0 km 0 mi	123.0 km 76.4 mi		Ichikawa	Chiba
1	Kōya JCT	Tokyo Gaikan Expressway	0.0 km 0 mi	123.0 km 76.4 mi		Ichikawa	Chiba
2	Wangan-Ichikawa IC	National Route 357	1.0 km 0.62 mi	122.0 km 75.8 mi	Ichikawa-bound exit, Itako-bound entrance only	Ichikawa	Chiba
2-1	Yatsu-Funabashi IC	National Route 357; Pref. Route 15 (Chiba Funabashi-Kaihin Route)	5.5 km 3.4 mi	117.5 km 73.0 mi	Itako-bound exit, Ichikawa-bound entrance only	Funabashi	Chiba
3	Wangan-Narashino IC	National Route 357	7.9 km 4.9 mi	115.10 km 71.52 mi	Itako-bound exit, Ichikawa-bound entrance only	Narashino	Chiba
TB	Narashino Toll Gate		↓	↑		Narashino	Chiba
PA	Wangan-Makuhari PA		8.7 km 5.4 mi	114.3 km 71.0 mi		Mihama-ku, Chiba	Chiba
4	Wangan-Chiba IC	National Route 357	11.6 km 7.2 mi	111.4 km 69.2 mi	Ichikawa-bound exit, Itako-bound entrance only	Mihama-ku, Chiba	Chiba
5	Miyanogi JCT	Keiyō Road	16.7 km 10.4 mi	106.3 km 66.1 mi	No access: Keiyō southbound → Higashi-Kantō westbound Higashi-Kantō eastbound → Keiyō northbound	Inage-ku, Chiba	Chiba
6	Chiba-kita IC	National Route 16	18.8 km 11.7 mi	104.20 km 64.75 mi		Inage-ku, Chiba	Chiba
7	Yotsukaidō IC	Pref. Route 64 (Chiba Usui Inzai Route)	24.6 km 15.3 mi	98.4 km 61.1 mi		Yotsukaidō	Chiba
8	Sakura IC	National Route 51	30.0 km 18.6 mi	93.0 km 57.8 mi		Sakura	Chiba
PA	Shisui PA		35.1 km 21.8 mi	87.90 km 54.62 mi		Shisui	Chiba
8-1	Shisui IC	National Route 51 / National Route 296 / National Route 409	37.0 km 23.0 mi	86.0 km 53.4 mi		Shisui	Chiba
9	Tomisato IC	National Route 409	39.5 km 24.5 mi	83.5 km 51.9 mi		Tomisato	Chiba
10	Narita IC/JCT	Shin-Kūkō Expressway; National Route 295 – Narita International Airport	44.9 km 27.9 mi	78.1 km 48.5 mi		Narita	Chiba
10-1	Taiei JCT	Ken-Ō Expressway	51.5 km 32.0 mi	71.5 km 44.4 mi		Narita	Chiba
PA	Taiei PA		51.6 km 32.1 mi	71.4 km 44.4 mi		Narita	Chiba
11	Taiei IC	National Route 51	56.6 km 35.2 mi	66.4 km 41.3 mi		Narita	Chiba
12	Sawara Katori IC	Pref. Route 55 (Sawara Yamada Route); Pref. Route 253 (Katori Tsunomiya Route)	65.9 km 40.9 mi	57.1 km 35.5 mi		Katori	Chiba
PA	Sawara PA		68.5 km 42.6 mi	54.5 km 33.9 mi		Katori	Chiba
BR	Tonegawa Bridge		↓	↑	Length - 630 m	Katori	Chiba
BR	Hitachi-Tonegawa Bridge		↓	↑		Itako	Ibaraki
13	Itako IC	Pref. Route 50 (Mito Kamisu Route); Pref. Route 101 (Itako Sawara Route)	74.5 km 46.3 mi	48.5 km 30.1 mi		Itako	Ibaraki
<14>	Itako-Namegata IC	Pref. Route 50 (Mito Kamisu Route)	85.6 km 53.2 mi	37.4 km 23.2 mi	Opened in 2027	Namegata	Ibaraki
<PA>	Namegata PA		88.1 km 54.7 mi	34.9 km 21.7 mi	Opened in 2027	Namegata	Ibaraki
15	Namegata IC	National Route 354	97.5 km 60.6 mi	23.5 km 14.6 mi		Namegata	Ibaraki
16	Hokota IC	Pref. Route 18 (Ibaraki Kashima Route)	105.4 km 65.5 mi	17.6 km 10.9 mi		Hokota	Ibaraki
17	Ibaraki-minami IC	Pref. Route 18 (Ibaraki Kashima Route)	114.2 km 71.0 mi	8.8 km 5.5 mi		Ibaraki	Ibaraki
15-1	Ibaraki JCT	Kita-Kantō Expressway	123.0 km 76.4 mi	0.00 km 0 mi		Ibaraki	Ibaraki
