= Port of Kashima =

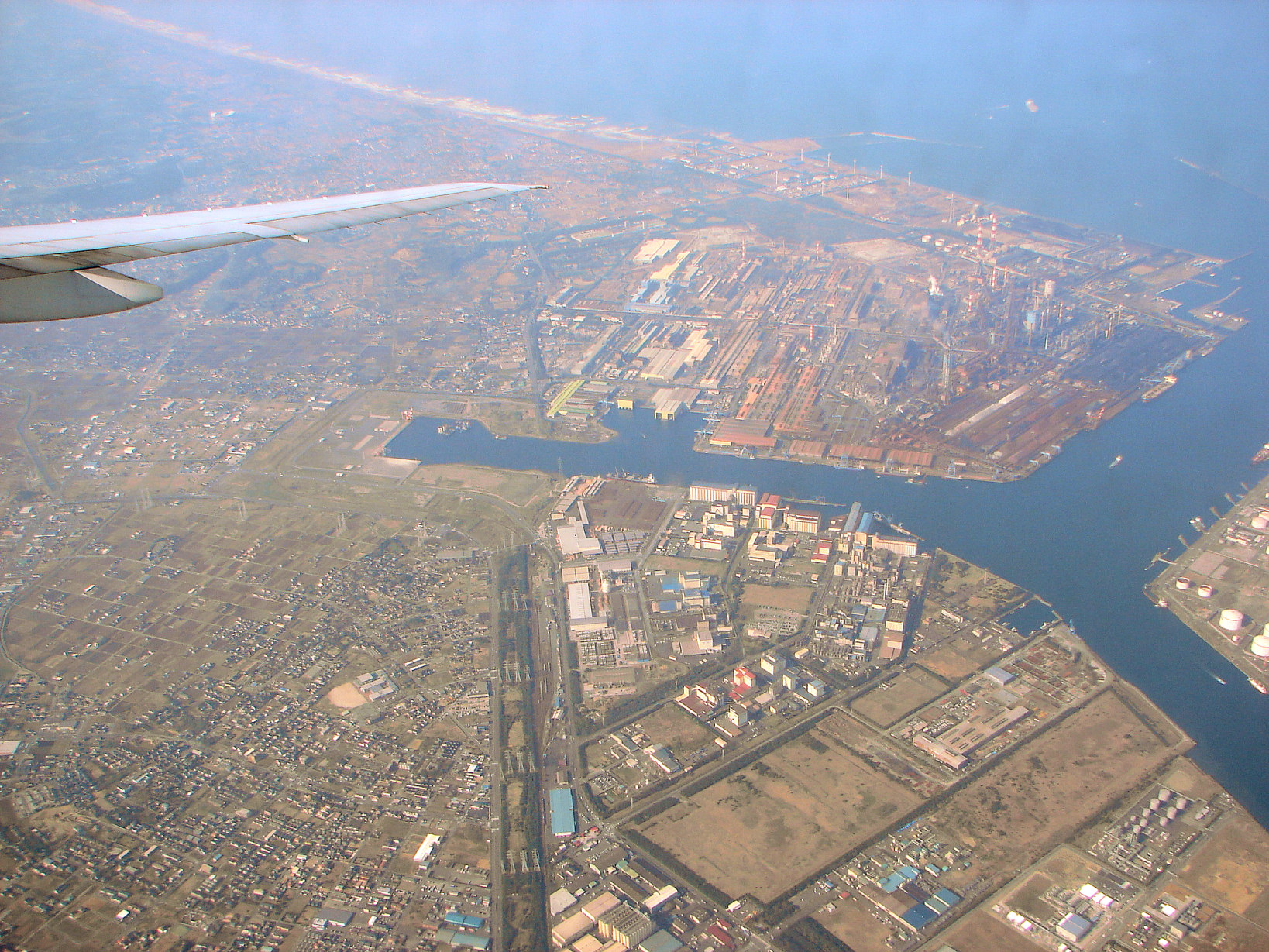
- Port of Kashima in the cities Kamisu and Kashima.
- Native name: 鹿島港

Location
- Country: Japan
- Location: Ibaraki Prefecture.

Details
- Opened: 1969
- Operated by: Ibaraki Prefecture
- Type of harbour: Public

The Port of Kashima (鹿島 港 Kashima-kō) is a Japanese seaport located in the cities of Kamisu and Kashima in Ibaraki Prefecture, Japan.

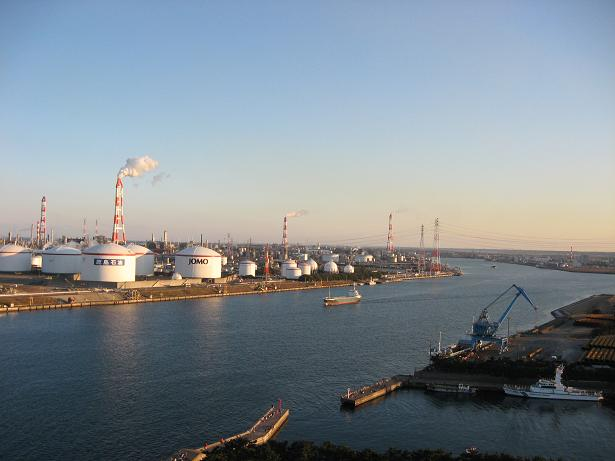
Kashima port area

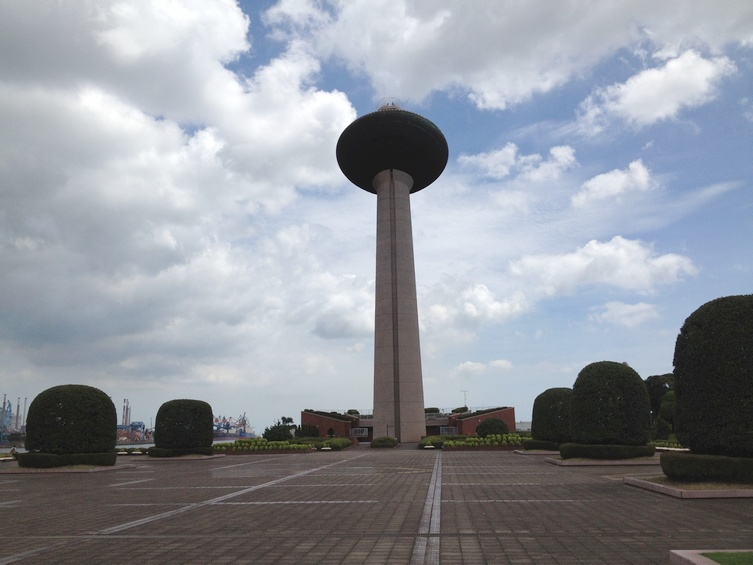
Harbor Park (港 公園 Minato Kōen) in Kamisu

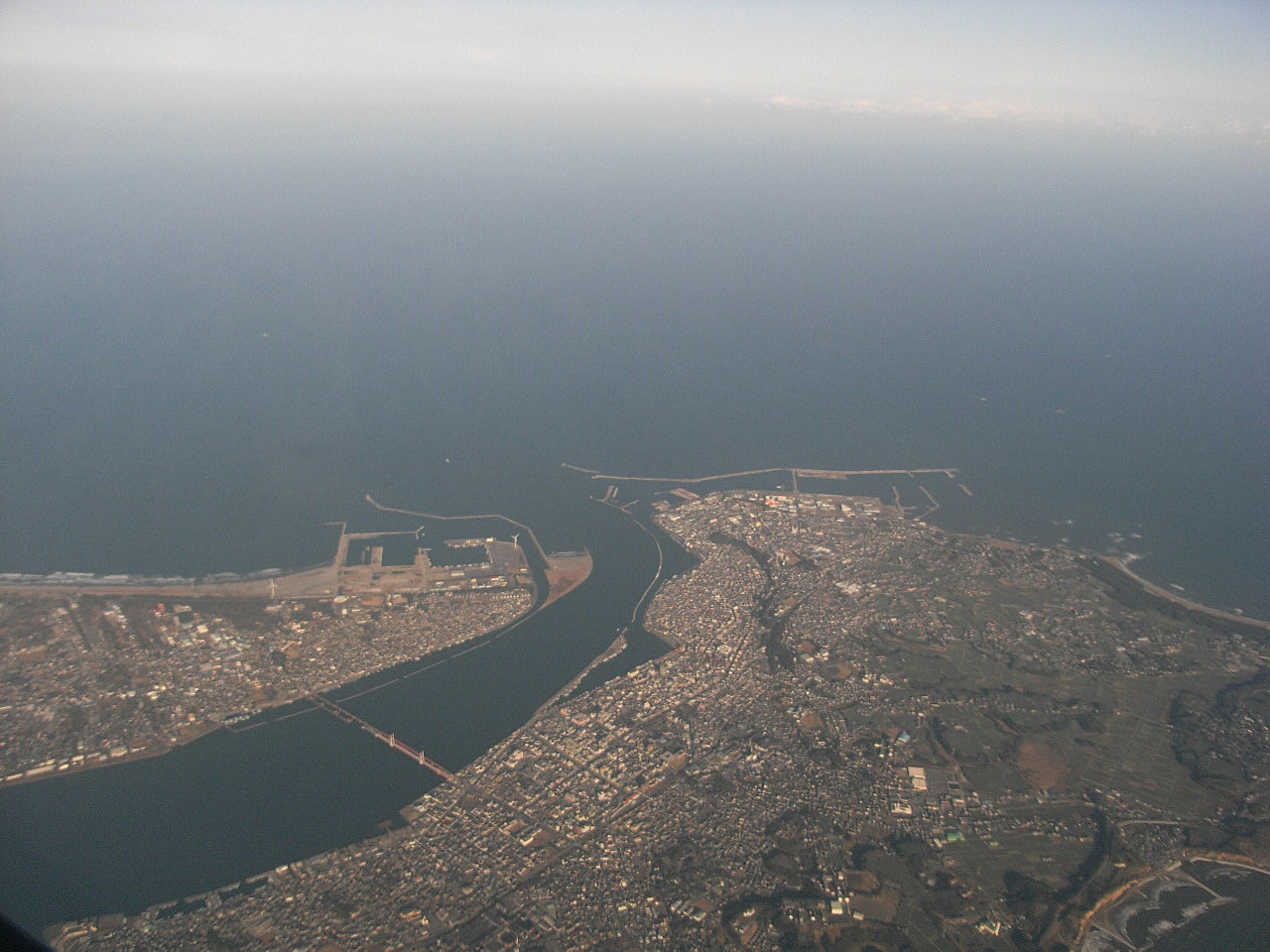
Hasaki and Chōshi Fishing Ports on the Tone River Estuary

== Port details ==
Facing the Pacific Ocean, it runs from north to south, from Kashima to Kamisu in Ibaraki Prefecture, and is connected with an extensive port industrial zone, especially petrochemical and steel plants, for importing a quantity of raw materials from abroad and exporting a quantity of products. The administrator of the port is the Ibaraki Prefecture, based on the law on ports and based on the port regulations.

The port was built in the area between lakes Kitaura and Sotonasakaura (Lake Kasumigaura) and the Kashima-nada coast. In addition to fishing in the sea, the area is used for recreation, with a boat destined for that purpose. The port owns an observation tower in the "Port Park" in the city of Kamisu.

== Main docks of the port ==
- North Public Wharf (北 公共 埠頭)
- South Public Wharf (南 公共 埠頭)
- Fukashiba Public Wharf (深芝 公共 埠頭)
- Ammonia Quay (アンモニア 岸壁). During the March 11 earthquake and tsunami of 2011, most of the jetty at the ammonia pier was rendered unusable. In the year 2013 the restoration of the ammonia dock was completed.

Port of Kashima (鹿島 港). Plans and satellite views: 35°55′58.4″N 140°41′39.0″E

== Main neighboring ports ==
- Port of Ibaraki (茨城 港), port on the Pacific Ocean, located in the central and northern part of Ibaraki prefecture, is an international port for the import and export of products, which is based through the towns from north to south of Hitachi, Tōkai, Hitachinaka and Ōarai, as its main docks. The administrator of the port is the Ibaraki Prefecture.
- Fishing ports
  - Hasaki Fishing Port (波 崎 漁港), located in the city of Kamisu, north of the mouth of the Tone River.
  - Chōshi Fishing Port (銚 子 漁港), located in the town of Chōshi in neighboring Chiba Prefecture, south of the mouth of the Tone River. It is a very important fishing port in Japan.

== Location ==
The port is located in the southeast of Ibaraki Prefecture, and northeast of the metropolis of Tokyo; on the shores of the Pacific Ocean.

The location is Nippon - Ibaraki-ken - Kamisu-shi To Kashima-shi.

The administrative address of the port is Ports & Harbors Division, Ibaraki Prefectural Government, Kasaharacho 978-6, Mito 310-8555, Ibaraki Pref., Japan.

== Land access from the port ==
The Narita International Airport in the nearby city of Narita and the metropolis of Tokyo, is linked, among others, by the Higashi-Kantō Expressway.

Also to one side, there is the National Route 356 which runs parallel to the Tone River, and later connecting with Route 6, is another way to access Tokyo.

The National Route 51 is nearby and allows traveling parallel to the Pacific Ocean, north of the prefecture, having access to reach the capital of the prefecture, the city of Mito.

In addition, the nearby National Route 125 is connected to the production centers of the cities of Tsuchiura, Tsukuba, among others.
