= Ken-Ō Expressway =

External toll-access ring road, numbered as C4, around Tokyo, Japan

Ken-Ō Expressway

- 圏央道

Route information
- Length: 300 km (190 mi)
- Existed: 1996–present
- History: Opened in stages since 1996
- Component highways: National Route 1 / National Route 126 / National Route 468

Major junctions
- Loop around Tokyo
- West end: Shin-Shōnan Bypass at Chigasaki Junction
- East end: Tateyama Expressway at Kisarazu Junction

Location
- Country: Japan
- Major cities: Chigasaki, Kanagawa; Atsugi, Kanagawa; Sagamihara, Kanagawa; Hachioji, Tokyo; Ome, Tokyo; Kawagoe, Saitama; Tsukuba, Ibaraki; Narita, Chiba; Ichihara, Chiba; Kisarazu, Chiba

Highway system
- National highways of Japan; Expressways of Japan
← National Route 467	→ National Route 469

The Ken-O Expressway (圏央道, Ken-Ō Dō), or Metropolitan Inter-City Expressway (首都圏中央連絡自動車道, Shuto-ken Chūō Renraku Jidōsha-dō), is a partially completed ticket system toll expressway in Japan. It is owned and operated by the Central Nippon Expressway Company and East Nippon Expressway Company. In conjunction with the Tokyo Bay Aqua-Line and the Bayshore Route of the Shuto Expressway, the expressway will form a full outer ring road of Tokyo. It is signed as National Route 468 as well as C4 under the "2016 Proposal for Realization of Expressway Numbering."

The section owned by the Central Nippon Expressway Company runs from the east end of the Shin-Shōnan Bypass west along the bypass and north to Akiruno Interchange. The rest of the route is owned by the East Nippon Expressway Company.

== Route description ==
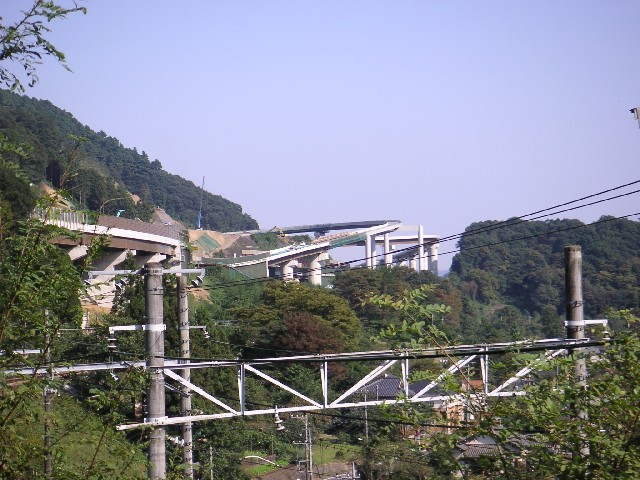
The Ken-Ō and Chūō Expressways meet at Hachiōji Junction.

The expressway begins at the west end of the Fujisawa Bypass (part of Route 1) in Fujisawa, Kanagawa. From here the expressway is concurrent with the Shin-Shōnan Bypass, which it splits from as that road turns toward the south at Chigasaki.

The Ken-O Expressway then heads north, crossing the Tōmei Expressway and Chūō Expressway. Continuing north, then east. There are junctions with the Kan-Etsu Expressway, Tōhoku Expressway, and Jōban Expressway. It then turns southeast, where it meets the Higashi-Kantō Expressway east of Narita Airport, there is gap in the expressway here that is planned to be closed. The expressway resumes at Choshu Renraku Road in Tōgane. It crosses the present east end of the Chiba-Tōgane Road, a two-lane expressway. The Ken-O Expressway continues south, looping west to end at the junction of the Tokyo Bay Aqua-Line and Tateyama Expressway.

== History ==
The Ken-Ō Expressway was linked with the Shin-Tōmei Expressway on 28 January 2018.

The smart interchange in Ōamishirasato was opened on 24 March 2019.

== Future ==
Portions of the existing Yokohama-Yokosuka Expressway, Shin-Shōnan Bypass and Chiba-Tōgane Road and the planned Yokohama Ring Expressway will be incorporated into the expressway. In Chiba Prefecture, land acquisition is under way for an 18 kilometres (11 mi) gap in the expressway to be filled. The new segment is expected to reach completion by 2026.

== Economic significance ==
Along with Japan National Route 16, the Ken-Ō Expressway will connect the entire length of the Technology Advanced Metropolitan Area (TAMA) — an inland industrial region covering an area of 3000 km^{2}, in 74 municipalities, and home to over 10 million people of whom 4 million work in the TAMA firms. In 1998 goods shipped from TAMA had twice the shipment value of the Silicon Valley.

== Junction list ==
Parking areas are appended with PA and smart interchanges are appended with SIC. There are currently no service areas.

Prefecture	Location	km	mi	Exit	Name	Destinations	Notes
Through to National Route 1 (Fujisawa Bypass)
Kanagawa	Fujisawa			-	Fujisawa	National Route 129	East end of concurrency with Shin-Shōnan Bypass. Western terminus of the expressway as of January 2018.
Kanagawa	Chigasaki	0	0.0	24	Chigasaki-chūō	Kanagawa Prefecture Routes 44/45	
Kanagawa	Chigasaki	0	0.0	25	Chigasaki	Shin-Shōnan Bypass west – Yokohama, Odawara	West end of concurrency with Shin-Shōnan Bypass;
Kanagawa	Samukawa	1.9	1.2	26	Samukawa-minami	Kanagawa Prefecture Route 44	The Ken-Ō Expressway turns from west to north, or south to east
Kanagawa	Samukawa	5.1	3.2	27	Samukawa-kita	Kanagawa Prefecture Route 46	
Kanagawa	Ebina	7.9	4.9	1	Ebina-minami	Shin-Tōmei Expressway west – Atsugi-Minami	
Kanagawa	Ebina	9.4	5.8	4-1	Ebina	Tōmei Expressway – Nagoya, Tokyo	
Kanagawa	Ebina	11.3	7.0	31	Ebina	Kanagawa Prefecture Route 43	
Kanagawa	Atsugi	16.2	10.1	32	Ken-Ō-Atsugi	National Route 129	
Kanagawa	Atsugi	17.5	10.9	PA	Atsugi Parking Area		
Kanagawa	Sagamihara	21.4	13.3	33	Sagamihara-Aikawa	National Route 129/ Kanagawa Prefecture Route 52	
Kanagawa	Sagamihara	30.3	18.8	34	Sagamihara	Kanagawa Prefecture Route 510	
Tokyo	Hachiōji	36.2	22.5	35	Takaosan	National Route 20	
Tokyo	Hachiōji	38.2	23.7	6	Hachiōji	Chūō Expressway – Kōfu, Shinjuku	
Tokyo	Hachiōji	42.6	26.5	41	Hachiōji-nishi	Tokyo Metropolitan Route 61	
Tokyo	Akiruno	47.8	29.7	42	Akiruno	National Route 411/ Tokyo Metropolitan Route 169	
Tokyo	Hinode	49.8	30.9	43	Hinode	Tokyo Metropolitan Route 184	
Tokyo	Ōme	58.5	36.4	44	Ōme	Tokyo Metropolitan Route 44	
Saitama	Iruma	63.3	39.3	45	Iruma	National Route 16	
Saitama	Sayama	67.4	41.9	PA	Sayama Parking Area		
Saitama	Sayama	69.3	43.1	46	Sayama Hidaka	Saitama Prefecture Route 397	
Saitama	Tsurugashima	76.1	47.3	47	Ken-Ō-Tsurugashima	National Route 407	
Saitama	Tsurugashima	78.3	48.7	50	Tsurugashima	Kan-etsu Expressway – Niigata, Nerima	
Saitama	Sakado	83.5	51.9	51	Sakado	Saitama Prefecture Route 269	
Saitama	Kawajima	86	53	52	Kawajima	National Route 254	
Saitama	Okegawa	91.7	57.0	60	Okegawa-Kitamoto	National Route 17	
Saitama	Okegawa	96.4	59.9	61	Okegawa-Kano	National Route 17/ Saitama Prefecture Route 12	
Saitama	Kuki	99.2	61.6	PA	Shobu PA		
Saitama	Shiraoka	102.5	63.7	62	Shiraoka-Shobu	National Route 122	
Saitama	Kuki	105.8	65.7	70	Kuki-Shiraoka	Tōhoku Expressway – Utsunomiya, Tokyo	
Saitama	Satte	114.3	71.0	71	Satte	Saitama Prefecture Route 383	
Ibaraki	Goka	118.5	73.6	72	Goka	National Route 4	
Ibaraki	Sakai	125.4	77.9	73	Sakai-Koga	National Route 354	The Ken-Ō Expressway turns from travelling north to south and south to north
Ibaraki	Bandō	134.5	83.6	74	Bandō	Ibaraki Prefecture Route 20	
Ibaraki	Bandō			PA	Bandō Parking Area		
Ibaraki	Jōsō	143.4	89.1	75	Jōsō	National Route 294	
Ibaraki	Tsukuba	150	93	-	Tsukuba SIC	Ibaraki Prefecture Route 45	Completion is set for 2021.
Ibaraki	Tsukuba	153.9	95.6	76	Tsukuba-chūō	Ibaraki Prefecture Route 19	
Ibaraki	Tsukuba	158.2	98.3	80	Tsukuba	Jōban Expressway – Iwaki, Tokyo	
Ibaraki	Tsukuba	159.7	99.2	81	Tsukuba-Ushiku	National Route 6	
Ibaraki	Ami	165.8	103.0	82	Ushiku-Ami	Ibaraki Prefecture Route 48	
Ibaraki	Ami	171.7	106.7	83	Ami-higashi	Ibaraki Prefecture Route 34	
Ibaraki	Inashiki	175.7	109.2	PA	Edosaki Parking Area		
Ibaraki	Inashiki	177.7	110.4	84	Inashiki	Ibaraki Prefecture Route 49	
Ibaraki	Inashiki	183.7	114.1	85	Inashiki-higashi	Ibaraki Prefecture Route 103	
Chiba	Kōzaki	188.3	117.0	86	Kōzaki	National Route 356	
Chiba	Narita	192.1	119.4	87	Shimofusa	Chiba Prefecture Route 63	
Chiba	Narita	198	123	90	Taiei	Higashi-Kantō Expressway – Narita International Airport, Kashima, Tokyo	
Chiba	Narita	200.9	124.8	91	Ken-O Narita	Chiba Prefecture Route 44	
Chiba	Tako	207.1	128.7	92	Tako	National Route 296	
Chiba	9 km gap in the expressway.						
Chiba	Sanmu	216.1	134.3	93	Matsuo-Yokoshiba	Choshu Renraku Road / Chiba Prefecture Route 62	
Chiba	Sanmu	223.5	138.9	94	Sanbu-Narutō	Chiba Prefecture Route 62	
Chiba	Tōgane	232.2	144.3	100	Tōgane	Chiba-Tōgane Road west – Chiba	
Chiba	Tōgane	232.2	144.3	101	Tōgane	National Route 126	
Chiba	Ōamishirasato	239.7	148.9	101-1	Ōamishirasato SIC		
Chiba	Mobara	243.1	151.1	102	Mobara-kita	Chiba Prefecture Route 21/ Chiba Sotobō Toll Road	
Chiba	Mobara	248.6	154.5	-	Mobara-Nagara SIC		Opened in 2020
Chiba	Chōnan	253.8	157.7	103	Mobara-Chōnan	National Route 409	
Chiba	Ichihara	262.6	163.2	104	Ichihara-Tsurumai	National Route 297	
Chiba	Ichihara	264.4	164.3	PA	Takatakiko Parking Are		
Chiba	Kisarazu	275.1	170.9	105	Kisarazu-higashi	National Route 410 / Chiba Prefecture Route 24 – Chiba, Ichihara, Kamogawa, Kururi	
Chiba	Sodegaura			-	Kazusa	Chiba Prefecture Route 33	
Chiba	Kisarazu	282.1	175.3	110	Kisarazu	Tateyama Expressway – Tateyama, Chiba	
Through to Tokyo Bay Aqua-Line
1.000 mi = 1.609 km; 1.000 km = 0.621 mi: Concurrency terminus; Electronic toll collection; Incomplete access; Unopened
