= E65 =

E65 may refer to:

- BMW E65/E66, a BMW car platform
- Eiffel 65, a Europop band from Italy
- European route E65, a north–south route connecting Malmö in Sweden and Chaniá in Greece
- Nokia E65, a business smartphone
- An envelope size (110 mm × 220 mm, holds 1/3 A4), also known as DL
- Shin-Kūkō Expressway, route E65 in Japan
