= Chiba Sotobō Toll Road =

Road in Chiba Prefecture, Japan

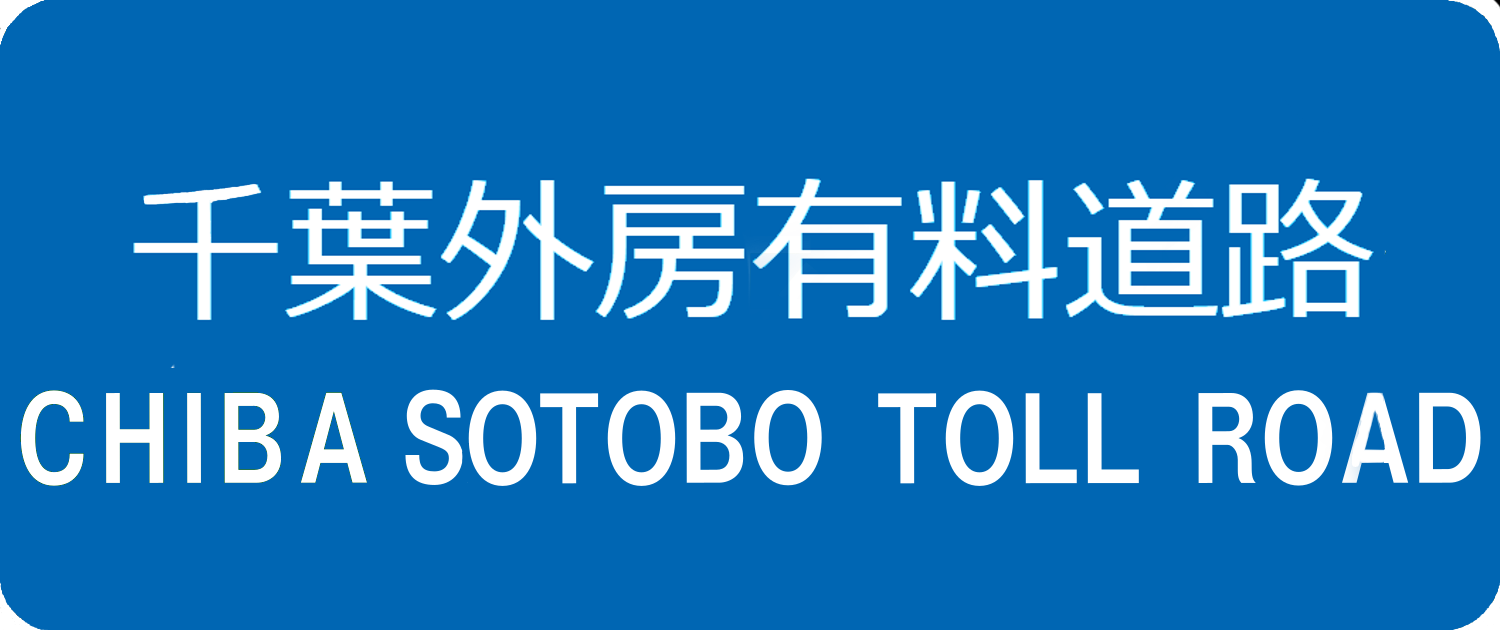
Chiba Sotobō Toll Road
- 千葉外房有料道路 (Chiba Sotobō Yūryōdōro)

Route information
- Length: 14.3 km (8.9 mi)

Major junctions
- From: Chiba Prefecture Route 21 in Mobara
- To: Chiba Prefecture Route 20 in Chiba

Location
- Country: Japan
- Major cities: Chiba

Highway system
- National highways of Japan; Expressways of Japan

The Chiba Sotobō Toll Road (千葉外房有料道路 Chiba Sotobō Yūryōdōro) is a former tolled road in Chiba Prefecture, Japan until end of January 2023. The route is used to be operated by the Chiba Prefecture Road Authority. Chiba Prefecture Route 67 is designated along the whole highway. It was built to alleviate traffic along Chiba Prefecture Route 20, connecting southeastern Chiba Prefecture to Chiba and Tokyo further to the west. The toll road runs between the Ken-Ō Expressway and Chiba-Tōgane Road, paralleling Route 20 and JR East's Sotobō Line from Mobara to Chiba. The toll road, unlike most toll roads in Japan, was not given an expressway number under the Ministry of Land, Infrastructure, Transport and Tourism's "2016 Proposal for Realization of Expressway Numbering".

== Route description ==
The western terminus of the toll road is in Chiba city at an intersection with the Oami Highway (Chiba Prefecture Route 20). The eastern terminus is in Mobara near the border with Chiba city. The road is a total of 14.3 kilometres (8.9 mi) long. The speed limit is 60 km/h for the entire route; even on the 4 lane section of road where speeding is commonplace. Due to this police heavily patrol the section of the toll road.

== Junction list ==
The entire toll road is in Chiba Prefecture.

Location	km	mi	Exit	Name	Destinations	Notes
Chiba	0	0.0	—	Kamatori	Chiba Prefecture Route 20 (Oami Highway)– Central Chiba, Ōamishirasato	Northbound exit, southbound entrance. Northern terminus
Chiba	0.5	0.31	—	Hirayama	Chiba Prefecture Route 67– Central Chiba, Chiba-Tōgane Road	Northbound exit, southbound entrance
Chiba	0.8	0.50	—	Heta Crossroads	Chiba Prefecture Route 66	At-grade intersection
Chiba	4.3	2.7	PA	Honda Parking Area		Northbound traffic only
Chiba	4.8	3.0	—	Takada	Unnamed road– Honda, Chiba-Tōgane Road	Southbound exit, northbound entrance
Chiba	6.8	4.2	—	Honda	Chiba Prefecture Route 20 (Oami Highway)– Central Chiba, Ōamishirasato	Southbound exit, northbound entrance
Chiba	9.9	6.2	TB	Ōno Toll Booth		
Chiba	10.5	6.5	—	Ōkido	Unnamed road– Toke Station, Toke Industrial Estate	
Chiba	10.9	6.8	PA	Ōno Parking Area		Southbound traffic only
Chiba	12.4	7.7	—	Itakura	Chiba Prefecture Route 132–Toke, Kongoji	Southbound exit, northbound entrance
Mobara	14.3	8.9	—	Katsura	Chiba Prefecture Route 21– Central Mobara, Ken-Ō Expressway	At grade intersection, southern terminus
Mobara	Through to Chiba Prefecture Route 21					
1.000 mi = 1.609 km; 1.000 km = 0.621 mi: Incomplete access; Unopened
