= Japan National Route 408 =

Road in Japan

National Route 408
- 国道408号
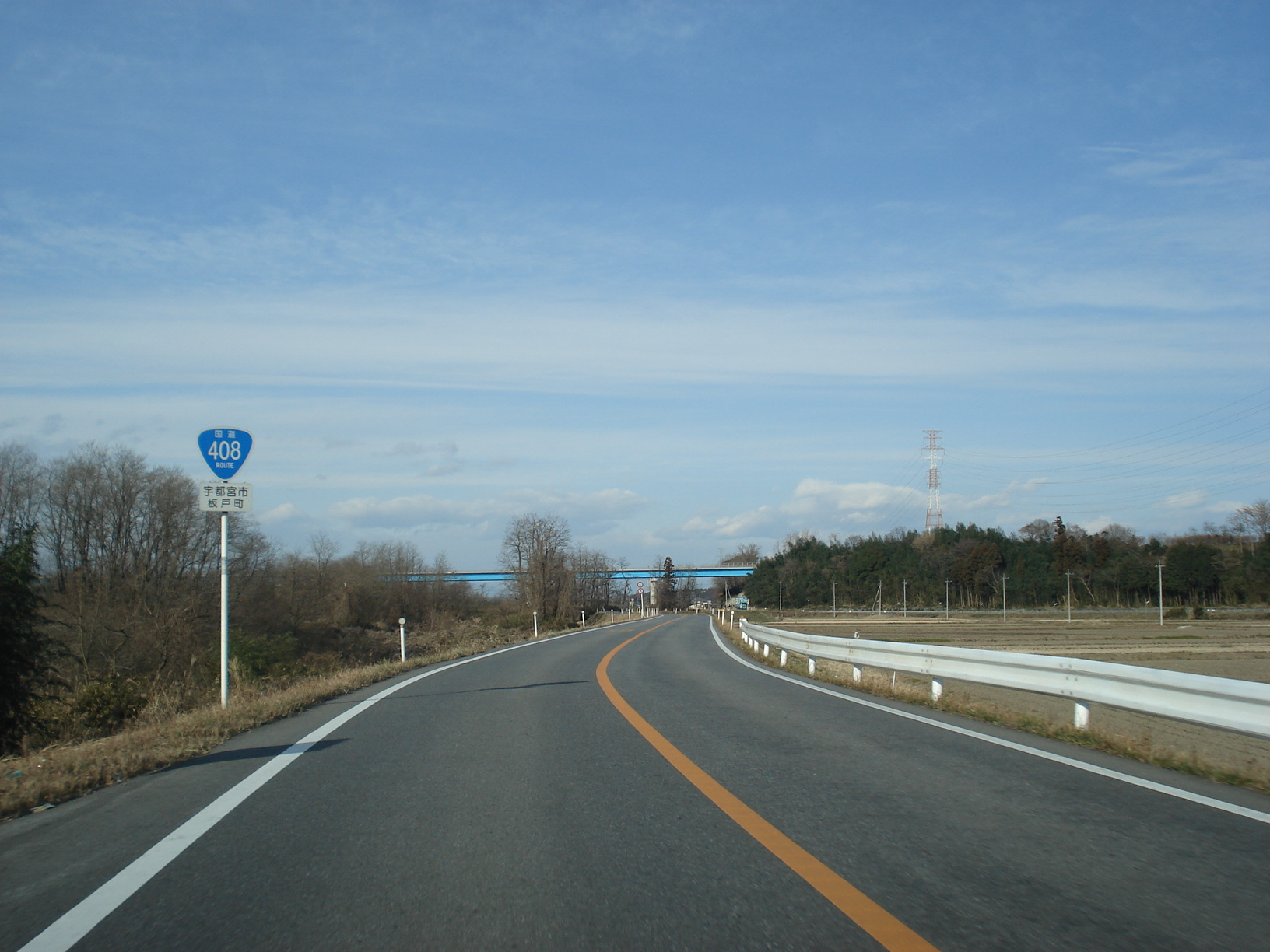

Route information
- Length: 116.9 km (72.6 mi)
- Existed: 1 April 1982–present

Major junctions
- North end: National Route 4 in Takanezawa, Tochigi
- South end: National Route 51 / National Route 295 in Narita, Chiba

Location
- Country: Japan

Highway system
- National highways of Japan; Expressways of Japan
← National Route 407	→ National Route 409

National Route 408 is a national highway of Japan connecting the cities of Narita, Chiba and Takanezawa, Tochigi, with a total length of 116.9 km (72.64 mi).
