= Japan National Route 409 =

Road in Japan

National Route 409
- 国道409号
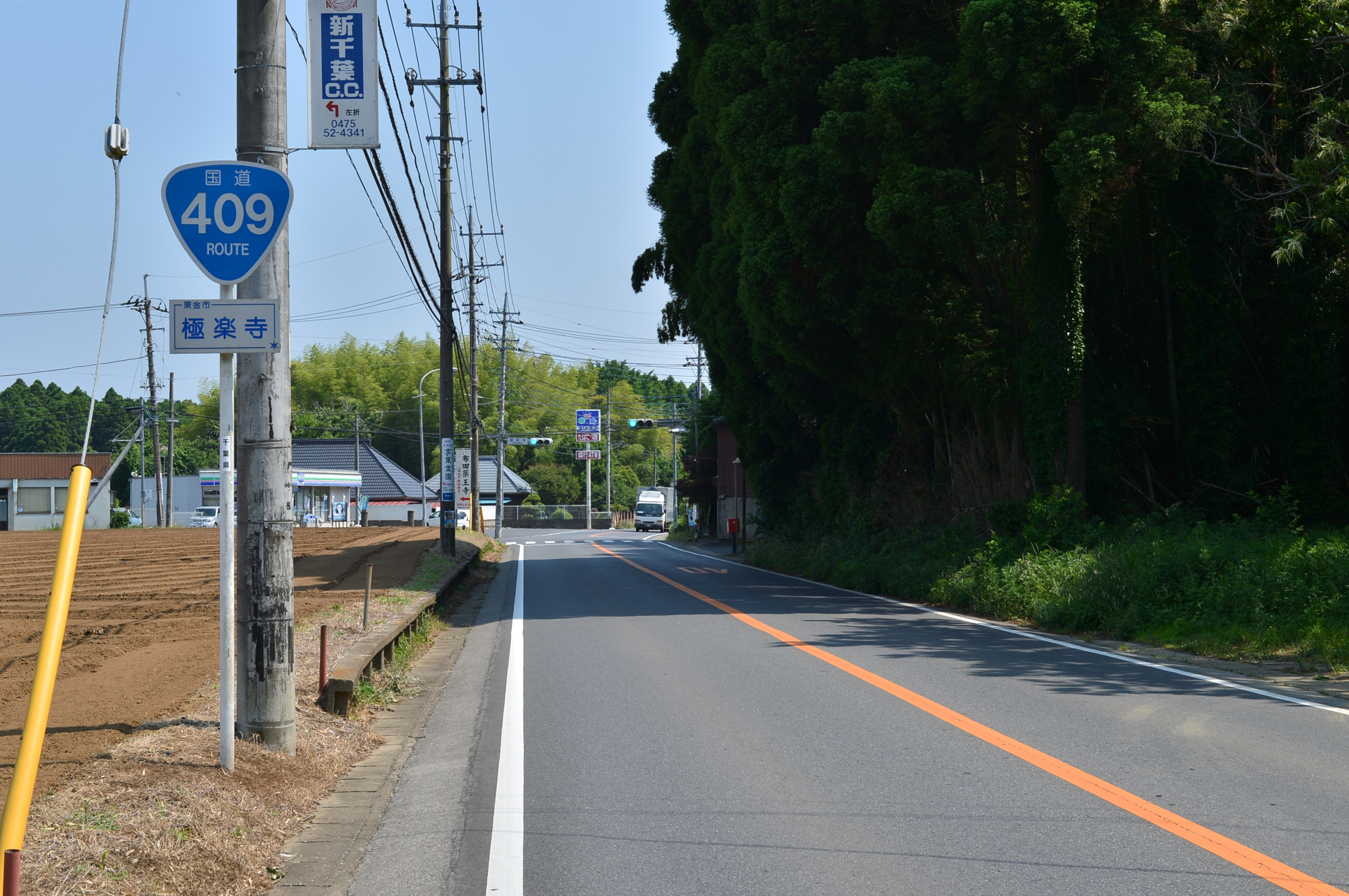

Route information
- Length: 119.3 km (74.1 mi)
- Existed: 1 April 1982–present

Major junctions
- West end: National Route 246 in Takatsu-ku, Kawasaki
- National Route 1; National Route 15; Tokyo Bay Aqua-Line; Ken-Ō Expressway; National Route 16; National Route 410; National Route 297; National Route 128; National Route 126; National Route 296
- East end: National Route 51 in Narita, Chiba

Location
- Country: Japan

Highway system
- National highways of Japan; Expressways of Japan
← National Route 408	→ National Route 410

National Route 409 is a national highway of Japan connecting Takatsu-ku, Kawasaki and Narita, Chiba in Japan, with a total length of 119.3 km (74.13 mi).

== See also ==
- Tokyo Bay Aqua-Line—part of Japan National Route 409
