= Iwadate =

Iwadate (written: 岩舘) is a Japanese surname. Notable people with the surname include:

- Manabu Iwadate (岩舘 学, born 1981), Japanese baseball player
- Mariko Iwadate (岩館 真理子, born 1957), Japanese manga artist
- Yuya Iwadate (岩舘 侑哉, born 1985), Japanese footballer

== See also ==
- Iwadate Station, a railway station in Akita, Japan
