= Shin-Shōnan Bypass =

Toll road in the Greater Tokyo area

Coordinates: 35°20′57″N 139°25′09″E

Shin-Shōnan Bypass
- 新湘南バイパス

Route information
- Length: 15.1 km (9.4 mi)
- Existed: 1988–present
- Component highways: National Route 1

Major junctions
- From: Fujisawa Interchange in Fujisawa, Kanagawa; National Route 1 / National Route 468 / Ken-Ō Expressway
- To: Ōiso-higashi Interchange in Ōiso, Kanagawa; National Route 1 / National Route 134 / Seishō Bypass

Location
- Country: Japan
- Major cities: Chigasaki, Hiratsuka

Highway system
- National highways of Japan; Expressways of Japan

The Shinshōnan Bypass (新湘南バイパス, Shinshōnan Baipasu) (lit. New Shōnan Bypass) is a 4-laned toll road in Kanagawa Prefecture, Japan. It is owned and managed by Central Nippon Expressway Company.

== Overview ==
Officially the road is designated as a bypass for National Route 1. It is also classified as a road for motor vehicles only (自動車専用道路, Jidōsha Senyō Dōro) and access is controlled with interchanges and junctions in a similar manner to national expressways in Japan.

An existing section of the road is also planned to be incorporated into the route of the Ken-Ō Expressway once adjoining sections of that expressway have been completed.

The first section of the road (8.4 km from Fujisawa Interchange to Chigasaki-nishi Interchange) was opened to traffic in 1988. A second section (6.7 km from Chigasaki-nishi Interchange to Ōiso-higashi Interchange) is planned; 1.6 km of the second section was opened to traffic in 1995. Beyond the terminus in Ōiso the road is expected to connect directly to the eastern terminus of the Seishō Bypass.

The toll for a regular passenger car to traverse the entire road is 400 yen. Electronic Toll Collection (ETC) is accepted for payment, however no discount programs are in effect.

== List of interchanges and features ==
The entire expressway is in Kanagawa Prefecture. TB=Toll gate

Location	km	mi	Exit	Name	Destinations	Notes
Through to Ken-Ō Expressway (planned)
Fujisawa	0.0	0.0	–	Fujisawa	National Route 1 / National Route 129	Eastern terminus; east end of Ken-Ō Expressway concurrency
Chigasaki	1.3	0.81	TB	Chigasaki		
Chigasaki	5.9	3.7	24	Chigasaki-chūō	Kanagawa Prefecture Route 45	
Chigasaki	6.1	3.8	25	Chigasaki	Ken-Ō Expressway north	West end of Ken-Ō Expressway concurrency
Chigasaki	8.4	5.2	–	Chigasaki-nishi	National Route 1	Westbound exit, eastbound entrance only
Chigasaki	9.6	6.0	–	Chigasaki-Kaigan	National Route 1	Westbound exit, eastbound entrance only
Hiratsuka	11.9	7.4	–	Hiratsuka	National Route 129 / National Route 134	
Hiratsuka			TB	Hiratsuka		
Ōiso	15.1	9.4	7	Ōiso-higashi	National Route 134	
Through to Seishō Bypass (planned)
1.000 mi = 1.609 km; 1.000 km = 0.621 mi: Concurrency terminus; Incomplete access; Unopened
