= Port of Ibaraki =

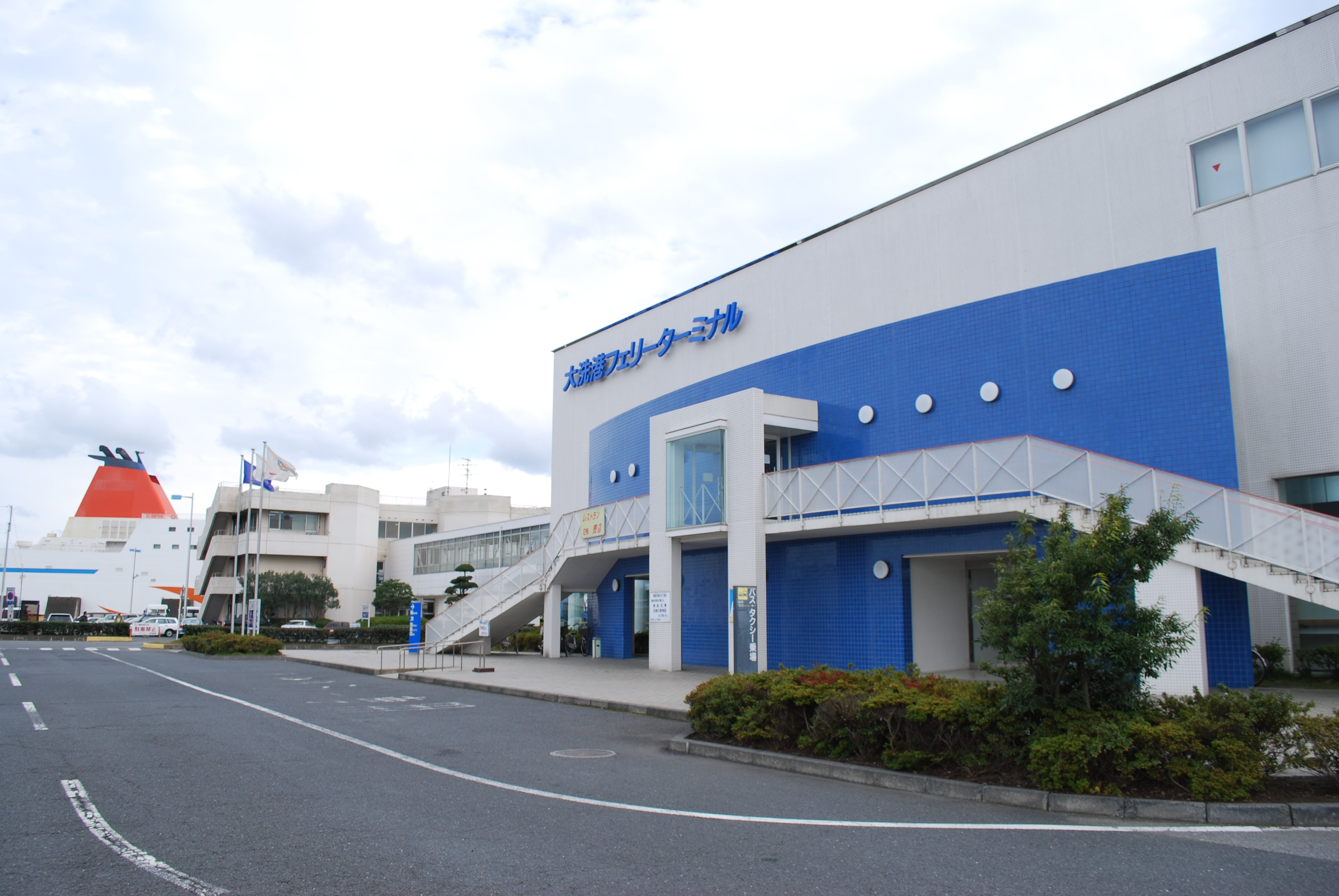
- Port of Ōarai, ferry terminal.
- Interactive map of Port of Ibaraki
- Native name: 茨城港

Location
- Country: Japan
- Location: Ibaraki Prefecture

Details
- Opened: 2008
- Operated by: Ibaraki Prefecture
- Type of harbour: Public

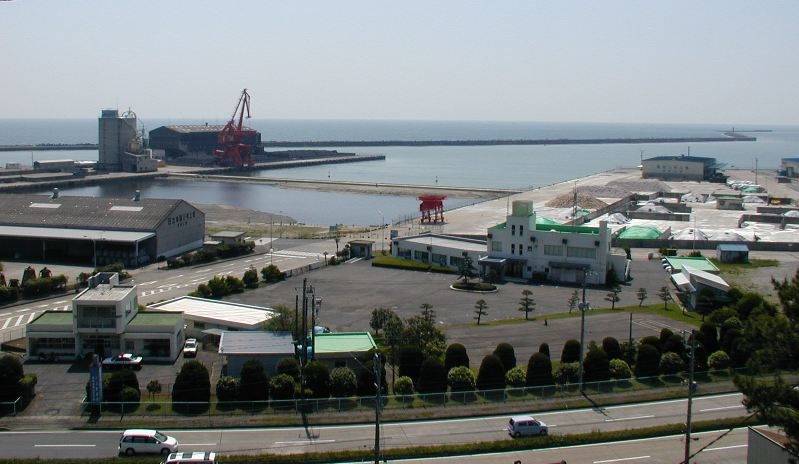
Hitachi port area

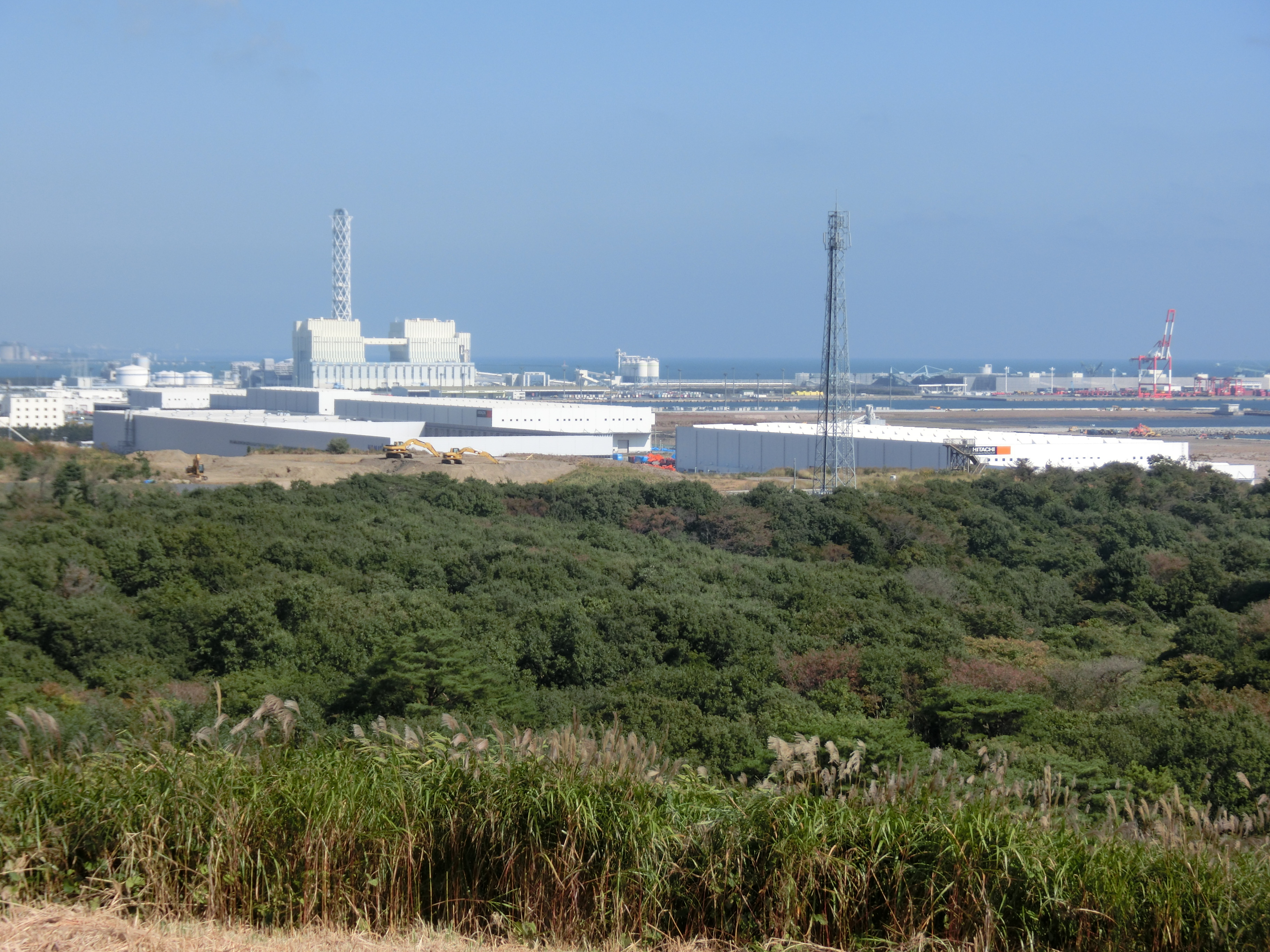
Hitachinaka port area

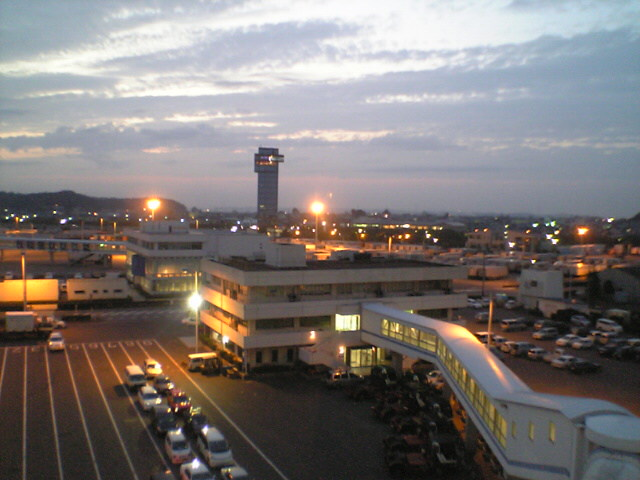
Ōarai port area

The Port of Ibaraki (茨城港 Ibaraki-kō) is a Japanese maritime port in northeast Ibaraki, Japan. It serves as the primary port for the industrial area centered on the city of Hitachi.

In 2008, it was established to integrate three ports: Port of Hitachi, Port of Hitachinaka, and Port of Ōarai.

Service to: north to south, Hitachi, Tokai, Hitachinaka, and Ōarai.

== Port details ==
Facing the Pacific Ocean, it stretches from north to south, from Hitachi to Ōarai in Ibaraki Prefecture, and is connected to an extensive industrial zone centered in the city of Hitachi. The administrator of the port is the Prefecture of Ibaraki, based on the law on ports and based on the port regulations.

The port is an integration of three ports, but also, sea fishing stands out in its surroundings and the area is used for recreation.

Port of Ōarai - Ferry route to Tomakomai, Muroran of Hokkaidō.

== Main docks of the port ==
Port of Ibaraki is based on three main docks.

- Port of Hitachi (日立 港). Plans and satellite views: 36°29′18.6″N 140°37′16.4″E
- Port of Hitachinaka (常 陸 那 珂 港). Plans and satellite views: 36°25′53.4″N 140°36′50.4″E
- Port of Ōarai (大 洗 港). Plans and satellite views: 36°18′28″N 140°34′26″E

== Administration ==
The administrative address of the port is: Ports & Harbors Division, Ibaraki Prefectural Government, Kasaharacho 978–6, Mito 310–8555, Ibaraki Pref., Japan.

== Main neighbor port ==
Ibaraki Prefecture has two ports, one is Port of Ibaraki supporting the north of the Kantō region and the other is Port of Kashima (鹿島 港). Port of Kashima is located in the cities of Kashima and Kamisu in the southeast of Ibaraki Prefecture.

== Land access to the port ==
The access roads to the area are mainly National Route 6 and the Jōban Expressway.

By rail, the Jōban Line of Japan Railways.
