= Narita Wholesale Market =

Coordinates: 35°44′55″N 140°17′39″E

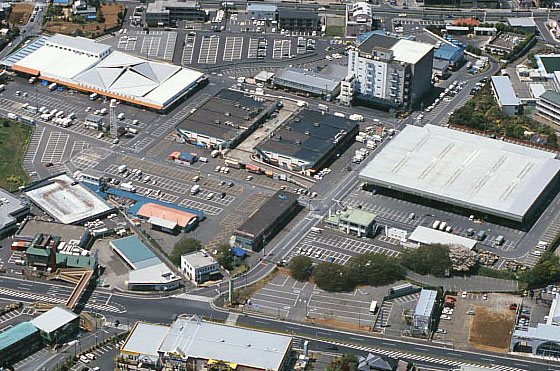
Narita Wholesale Market viewed from the air, July 2006

The Narita Wholesale Market (成田市公設地方卸売市場) is a public wholesale fish, fruit, and vegetable market in Narita, Chiba, Japan. It is located near Narita International Airport.

== History ==
In 1974, Narita City opened the public wholesale market to meet the demand of a growing population resulting from the opening of Narita International Airport in 1978.

== Operations ==
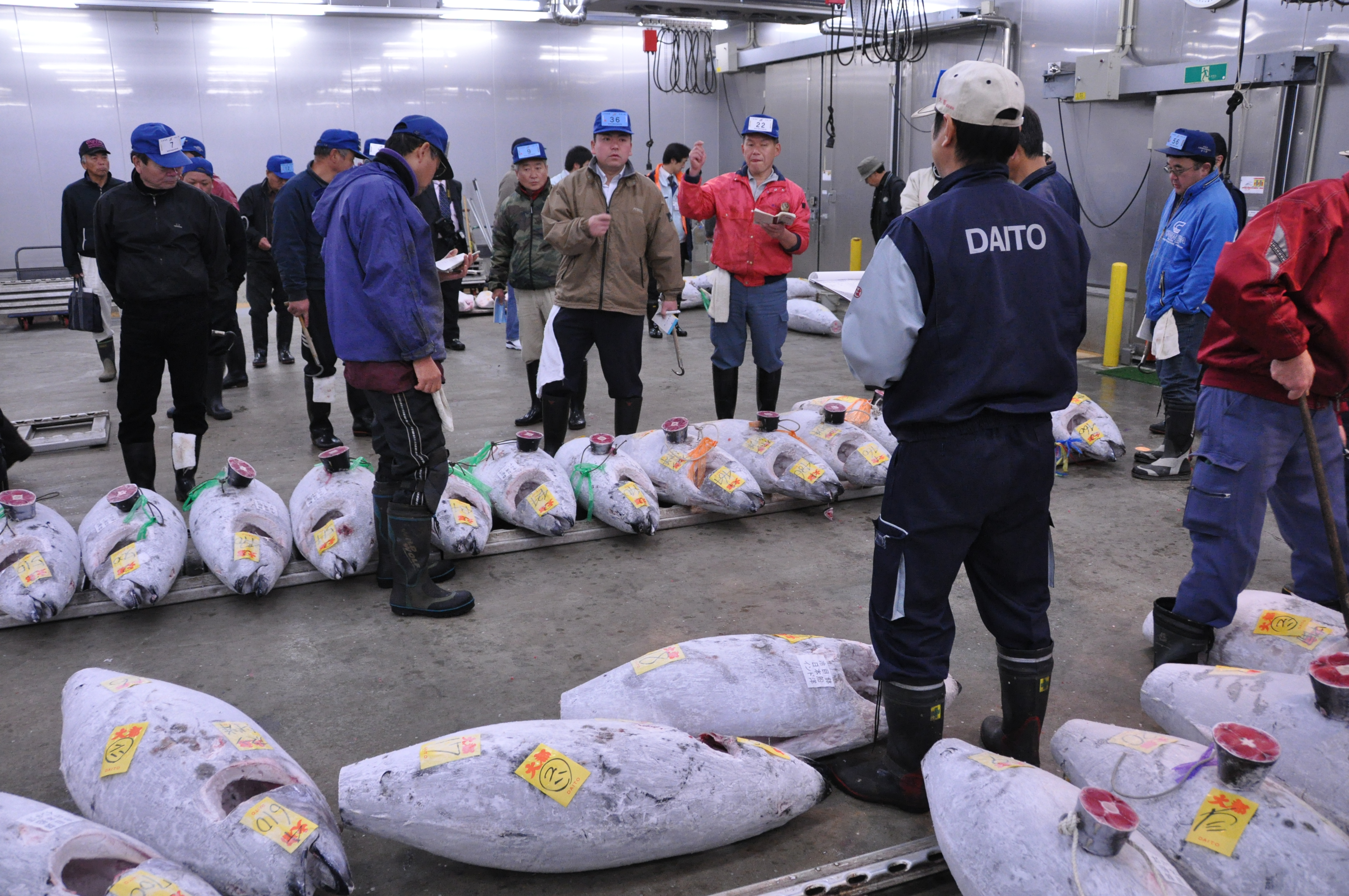
Tuna auction at the market, November 2009

The market opens most mornings (except Sundays, holidays and some Wednesdays). The tuna auction starts around 05:30. Most of the 200 shops in the market close by the early afternoon. Reservations are required to observe the tuna auctions.
