= Shin-Kūkō Expressway =

Expressway in Narita, Chiba, Japan

Shin-Kūkō Expressway
- 新空港自動車道

Route information
- Length: 3.9 km (2.4 mi)
- Existed: 1978–present

Major junctions
- From: Narita Junction in Narita, Chiba; Higashi-Kantō Expressway
- To: Shin-Kūkō Interchange in Narita, Chiba

Location
- Country: Japan

Highway system
- National highways of Japan; Expressways of Japan

The Shin-Kūkō Expressway (新空港自動車道, Shin-Kūkō Jidōsha-dō) (lit. New Airport Expressway) is a 4-laned national expressway in Narita, Chiba, Japan. It is owned and operated by East Nippon Expressway Company.

== Overview ==
The expressway is a short connector route linking Narita International Airport (formerly New Tokyo International Airport) with the Higashi-Kantō Expressway, which eventually leads into the Tokyo urban area.

The route of the expressway runs alongside National Route 295.

== Interchange list ==
- IC - interchange, JCT - junction

No.	Name	Connections	Dist. from Origin	Dist. from Terminus	Notes	Location
(10)	Narita IC/ JCT	Higashi-Kantō Expressway	0.0 km 0 mi	3.9 km 2.4 mi	Narita IC: No local road access to/from Shin-Kūkō Expwy	Narita, Chiba
1	Shin-Kūkō IC	Narita International Airport	3.9 km 2.4 mi	0.0 km 0 mi		Narita, Chiba
