= Chiba-Tōgane Road =

Toll road in the Greater Tokyo area

Chiba-Tōgane Toll Road
- 国道%route%号
- 千葉東金道路 (Chiba Tōgane Dōro)

Route information
- Maintained by East Nippon Expressway Company
- Length: 32.2 km (20.0 mi)
- Existed: 1979–present

Major junctions
- From: Chiba-higashi Junction in Chūō-ku, Chiba; Keiyō Road
- To: Matsuo-Yokoshiba Interchange in Sanmu, Chiba; Ken-Ō Expressway; Chōshi Renraku Road; Chiba Prefectural Route 62

Location
- Country: Japan
- Major cities: Tōgane

Highway system
- National highways of Japan; Expressways of Japan

The Chiba-Tōgane Road (千葉東金道路, Chiba Tōgane Dōro) is a toll road in Chiba Prefecture, Japan. It is owned and operated by East Nippon Expressway Company.

== Overview ==
Officially the road is designated as National Route 126. The road is built to an expressway standard and is classified as a road for motor vehicles only (自動車専用道路, Jidōsha Senyō Dōro) (motor vehicles must have a displacement of at least 125 cc).

The road consists of two distinct sections. The first section (Chiba-higashi Junction to Tōgane Interchange) was opened in 1979 and connects the prefectural capital Chiba with the city of Tōgane. It is 4 lanes for its entire length.

The second section (Tōgane Interchange to Matsuo-Yokoshiba Interchange) was opened in 1998 and is 2 lanes. This section is designed to become part of the future Ken-Ō Expressway. The expressway will extend south beyond Tōgane Interchange (expected to open in 2009-2010) and north beyond Matsuo-Yokoshiba Interchange (route is currently under assessment).

Electronic Toll Collection (ETC) is accepted, however no discount programs are in effect.

== List of interchanges and features ==
- IC - interchange, JCT - junction, PA - parking area

No.	Name	Connections	Dist. from Origin	Notes	Location (all in Chiba)
(10) 1	Chiba-higashi JCT/ IC	Keiyō Road; National Route 16	0.0	IC: Chiba-bound exit, Tōgane-bound entrance only	Chūō-ku, Chiba
2	Ōmiya IC		3.2		Wakaba-ku, Chiba
3	Takada IC		7.5		Midori-ku, Chiba
PA	Noro PA		↓		Wakaba-ku, Chiba
4	Nakano IC	Pref. Route 129 (Honda Teishajō Nakano Route)	11.4		Wakaba-ku, Chiba
5	Yamada IC	Pref. Route 83 (Yamadadai Ōami Shirasato Route)	13.9	Tōgane-bound exit, Chiba-bound entrance only	Tōgane
6	Tōgane IC	Ken-Ō Expressway; National Route 126	16.1		Tōgane
7	Sanbu-Narutō IC	Pref. Route 76 (Narutō Shisui Route)	24.8		Sanmu
8	Matsuo-Yokoshiba IC	Chōshi Renraku Road; Pref. Route 62 (Narita Matsuo Route)	32.2		Sanmu
Through to Ken-Ō Expressway (Planned)
