= Narita, Chiba =

Narita 成田市
- City
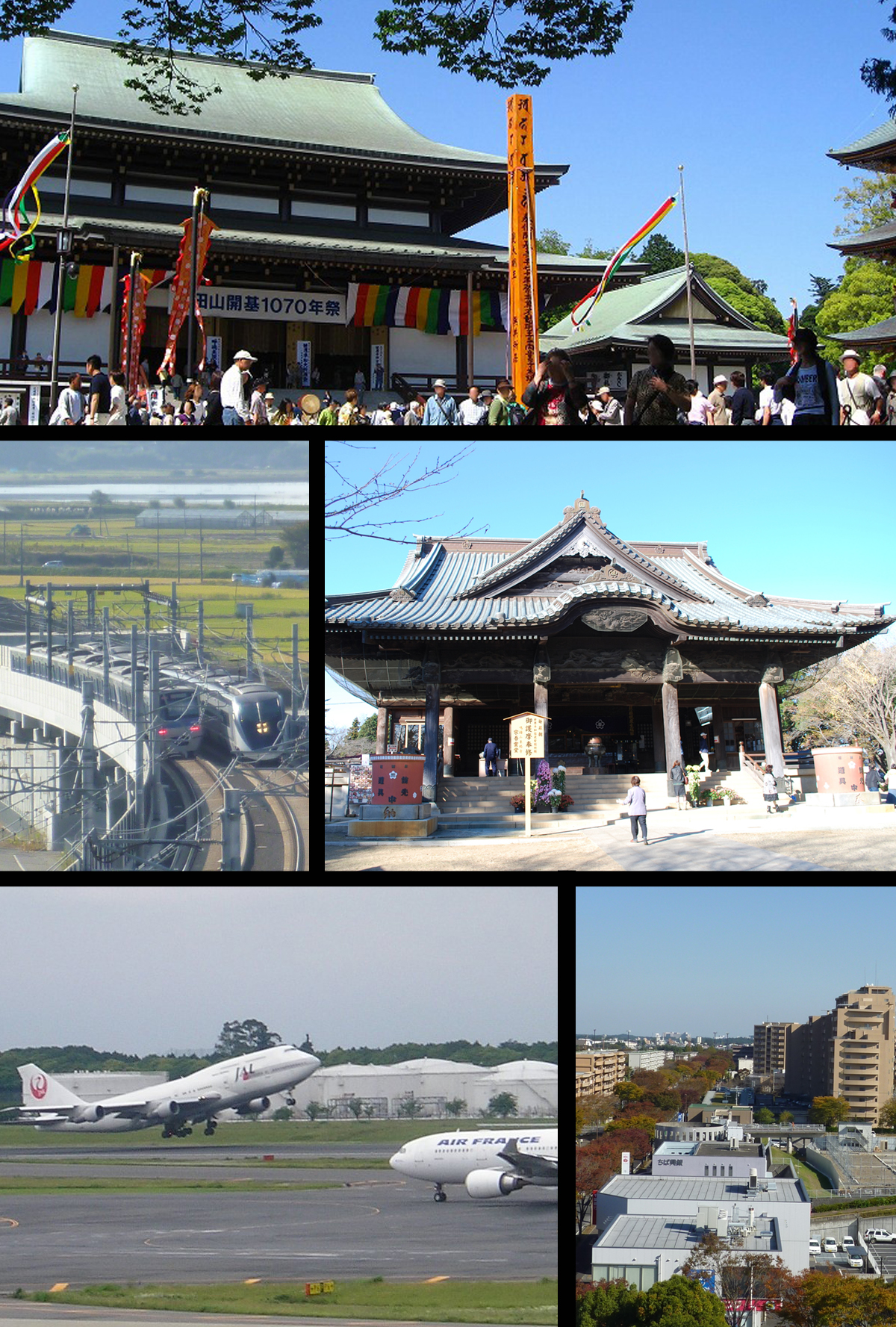
- Top: Narita-san Shinshō-ji Temple, Middle left: Narita Sky Access Line, Middle right: Tōshō-ji Temple in Sōgo area, Bottom left: Narita International Airport, Bottom right: Narita Newtown in Karabe area

- Flag Seal
- Location of Narita in Chiba Prefecture

- Coordinates: 35°46′36″N 140°19′6″E
- Country: Japan
- Region: Kantō
- Prefecture: Chiba

Government
  - Mayor: Kazunari Koizumi

Area
  - Total: 213.84 km^{2} (82.56 sq mi)

Population (November 30, 2020)
  - Total: 131,852
  - Density: 616.59/km^{2} (1,597.0/sq mi)
- Time zone: UTC+09:00 (Japan Standard Time)
- Phone number: 0476-22-1111
- Address: 760 Hanasaki-cho, Narita-shi, Chiba-ken 286-8585
- Climate: Cfa
- Website: Official website
- Symbols
- Flower: Hydrangea
- Tree: Ume

Narita (成田市, Narita-shi) is a city in Chiba Prefecture, Japan. As of 30 November 2020, the city had an estimated population of 131,852 in 63,098 households and a population density of 620 persons per km^{2}. The total area of the city is 213.84 km^{2} (82.56 sq mi). It is the site of Narita International Airport, one of the two main international airports serving the Greater Tokyo Area.

== Geography ==
Narita is located in the northern center of Chiba prefecture, about 25 kilometres (16 mi) from the prefectural capital at Chiba and 50 to 60 kilometres (31 to 37 mi) from the center of Tokyo. Narita International Airport is about 5 kilometres (3.1 mi) further from the city center of Narita (the location of the city hall). Located on the Shimosa Plateau, the old town (centered on Narita-san) and the new town are in the southwestern part of the city, and Narita International Airport is in the hills in the southeast. Agricultural areas take water from the Tone River, which runs through the border between Imba-numa in the western part of the city and Ibaraki prefecture on the north. Most of the city is between 10 and 40 metres (33 and 131 ft) above sea level.

=== Surrounding municipalities ===
Chiba Prefecture

- Inzai
- Katori
- Kōzaki
- Sakae
- Shibayama
- Shisui
- Tako
- Tomisato

Ibaraki Prefecture

- Kawachi

=== Climate ===
Narita has a humid subtropical climate (Köppen Cfa) characterized by warm summers and cool winters with light to no snowfall. The average annual temperature in Narita is 14.8 °C (58.6 °F). The average annual rainfall is 1,498.4 mm (58.99 in) with October as the wettest month. The temperatures are highest on average in August, at around 26.0 °C (78.8 °F), and lowest in January, at around 3.9 °C (39.0 °F).

Climate data for Narita (2003−2020 normals, extremes 2003−present)
Month	Jan	Feb	Mar	Apr	May	Jun	Jul	Aug	Sep	Oct	Nov	Dec	Year
Record high °C (°F)	19.4 (66.9)	24.4 (75.9)	24.9 (76.8)	29.6 (85.3)	31.3 (88.3)	33.8 (92.8)	38.4 (101.1)	36.9 (98.4)	35.5 (95.9)	32.0 (89.6)	25.3 (77.5)	24.2 (75.6)	38.4 (101.1)
Mean daily maximum °C (°F)	9.4 (48.9)	10.4 (50.7)	13.7 (56.7)	18.4 (65.1)	22.7 (72.9)	25.2 (77.4)	28.9 (84.0)	30.7 (87.3)	27.1 (80.8)	21.7 (71.1)	16.9 (62.4)	12.0 (53.6)	19.8 (67.6)
Daily mean °C (°F)	3.9 (39.0)	5.0 (41.0)	8.3 (46.9)	13.0 (55.4)	17.6 (63.7)	20.9 (69.6)	24.5 (76.1)	26.0 (78.8)	22.8 (73.0)	17.4 (63.3)	12.0 (53.6)	6.5 (43.7)	14.8 (58.7)
Mean daily minimum °C (°F)	−2.2 (28.0)	−0.6 (30.9)	2.5 (36.5)	7.4 (45.3)	12.7 (54.9)	17.1 (62.8)	21.1 (70.0)	22.4 (72.3)	19.3 (66.7)	13.3 (55.9)	6.7 (44.1)	0.6 (33.1)	10.0 (50.0)
Record low °C (°F)	−8.9 (16.0)	−8.9 (16.0)	−5.2 (22.6)	−2.1 (28.2)	0.8 (33.4)	7.1 (44.8)	15.0 (59.0)	15.0 (59.0)	8.4 (47.1)	3.0 (37.4)	−2.8 (27.0)	−8.4 (16.9)	−8.9 (16.0)
Average precipitation mm (inches)	63.8 (2.51)	69.7 (2.74)	102.1 (4.02)	125.1 (4.93)	129.1 (5.08)	144.1 (5.67)	116.2 (4.57)	121.8 (4.80)	194.9 (7.67)	257.6 (10.14)	106.0 (4.17)	68.1 (2.68)	1,498.4 (58.99)
Average precipitation days (≥ 1.0 mm)	5.1	6.8	9.9	10.3	10.1	10.8	9.3	7.6	10.8	11.6	8.8	6.1	107.2
Source 1: Japan Meteorological Agency
Source 2: Narita Aviation Weather Service Center

== Demographics ==
Per Japanese census data, the population of Narita has recently plateaued after several decades of growth.

Historical population
Year	Pop.	±%
1950	64,370	—
1960	61,869	−3.9%
1970	59,365	−4.0%
1980	85,897	+44.7%
1990	105,855	+23.2%
2000	116,898	+10.4%
2010	128,933	+10.3%
2020	132,906	+3.1%

== History ==
The area Narita has been inhabited since the Japanese Paleolithic period. Archaeologists have found stone tools dating to some 30,000 years ago on the site of Narita Airport. Numerous shell middens from the Jōmon period, and hundreds of burial tumuli from the Kofun period have been found in numerous locations around Narita. Place names in the vicinity of Narita appear in the Nara period Man'yōshū (although the name “Narita” does not appear in written records until 1408). As Narita is located roughly equidistant from the Pacific Ocean and Tokyo Bay, around a number of small rivers, it was a natural political and commercial center for the region, and gained importance as a pilgrimage destination with the foundation of the noted Buddhist temple of Shinsho-ji in 940 AD. During the Heian period, the area was a center for the revolt of Taira Masakado. During the Edo period, the area continued to prosper as part of the tenryō within Shimōsa Province under direct control of the Tokugawa shogunate.

After the Meiji Restoration, the area was organized as a town under Inba District on April 1, 1889. Portions of the town were destroyed by Allied air raids in February and May, 1945. On March 31, 1954, Narita gained city status through merger with the neighboring villages of Habu, Nakago, Kuzumi, Toyosumi, Toyama, and Kozu. Growth in the area began in earnest in 1966, when Prime Minister Eisaku Satō laid out the plan for Narita International Airport. The development of the airport and accompanying access to central Tokyo led to widespread residential, commercial and industrial development in the city. However, construction of the airport was widely opposed, and violent demonstrations occurred through the end of the 1960s and early 1970s, which delayed the opening of the airport until May 20, 1978.

On March 27, 2006, the towns of Shimofusa and Taiei (both from Katori District) were merged into Narita.

== Government ==
Narita has a mayor-council form of government with a directly elected mayor and a unicameral city council of 30 members. Narita contributes two members to the Chiba Prefectural Assembly. In terms of national politics, the city is part of the Chiba 10th district of the lower house of the Diet of Japan.

== Areas ==
=== Central Narita ===
Central Narita is roughly defined as the area between Narita Station, Keisei Narita Station and the Narita-san Temple. The main road in central Narita is Omotesandō (表参道), which is lined with about 150 small shops and has been extensively renovated in recent years.

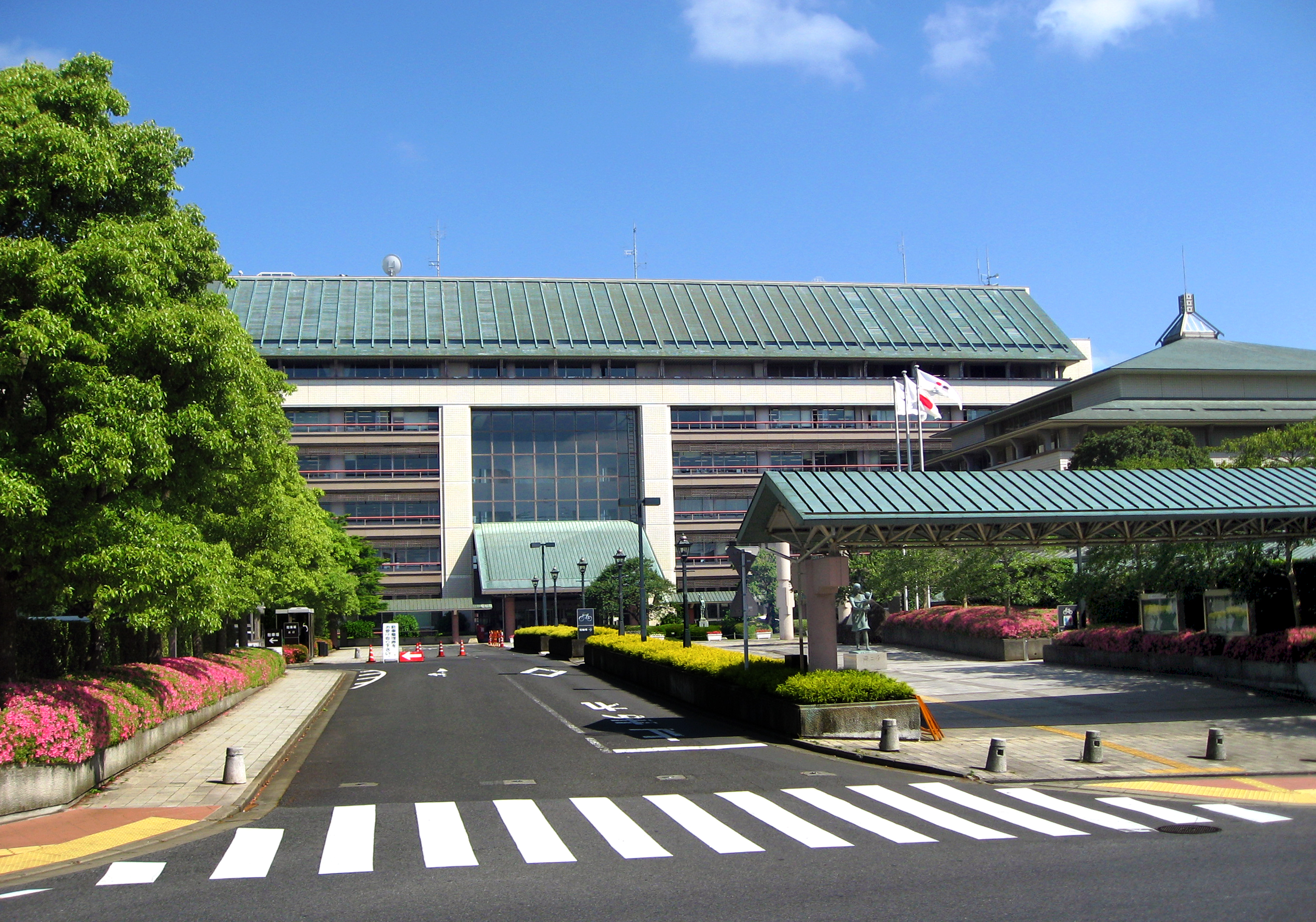
Narita City Hall

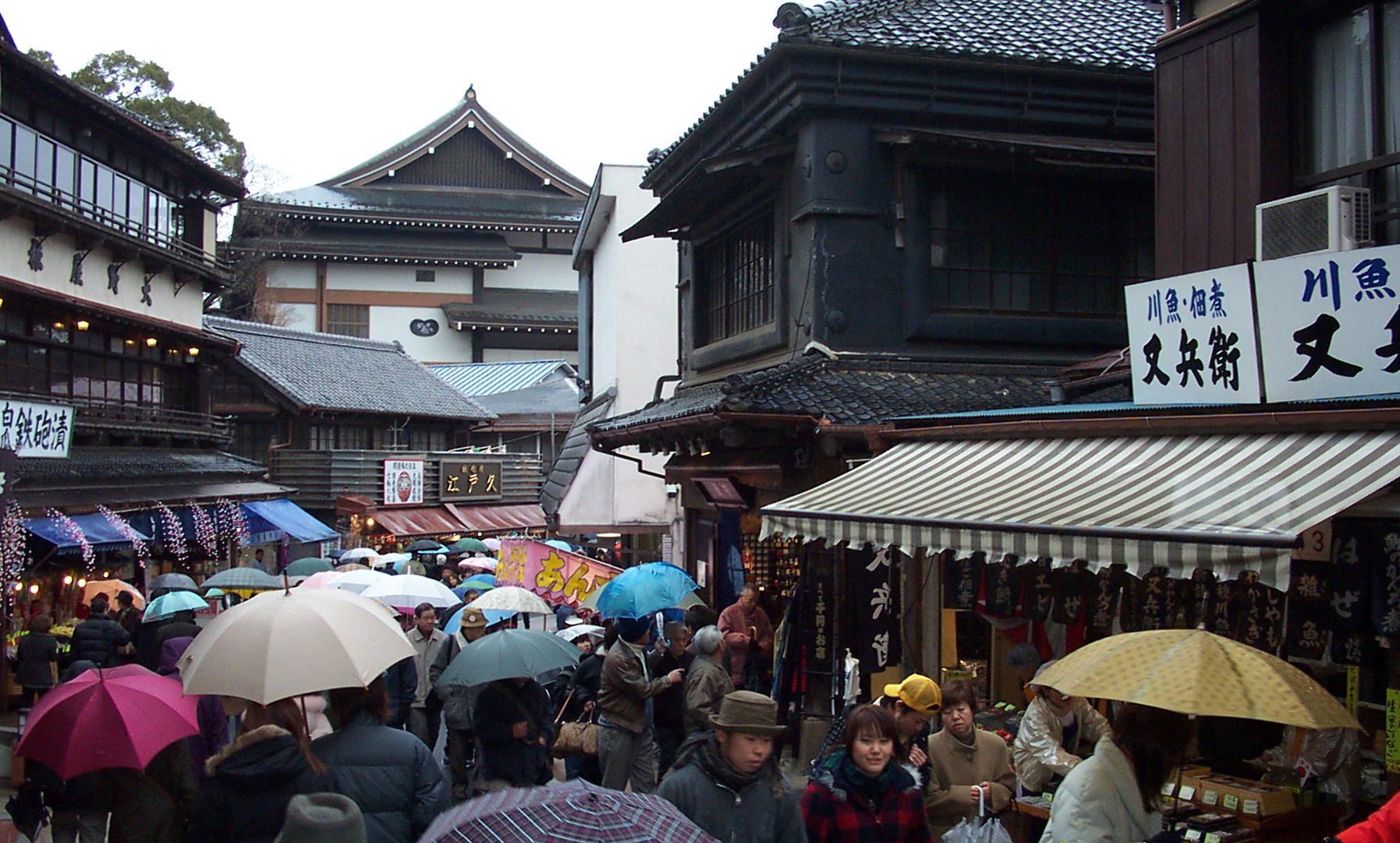
The street of Narita-san temple

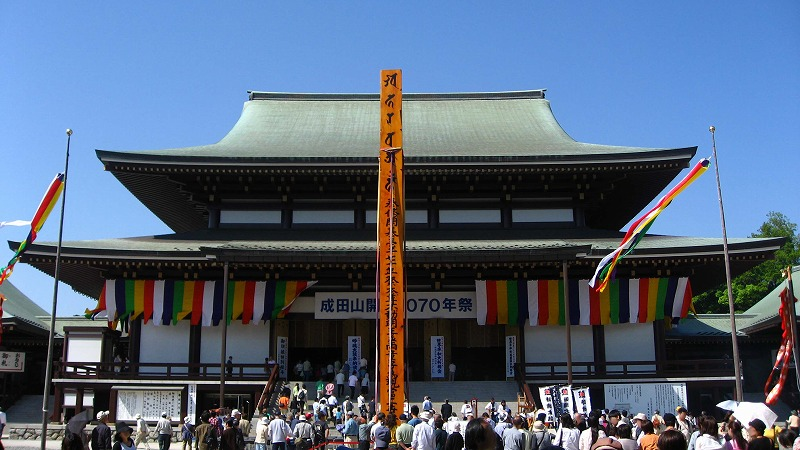
Main Hall of Narita-san temple

=== Narita New Town ===
Narita New Town is a planned residential area to the west of Narita Station. It has 16,000 homes with a total population of 60,000. The area was designed in 1968 based on the new towns surrounding London in the UK, and now houses most of the city's population. Many residents of the area are airport or airline workers: the area houses corporate housing and dormitories for Japan Airlines, All Nippon Airways, the Japan Civil Aviation Bureau and Japan Customs. There are also several Urban Renaissance Agency and other government-subsidized housing projects in the area.

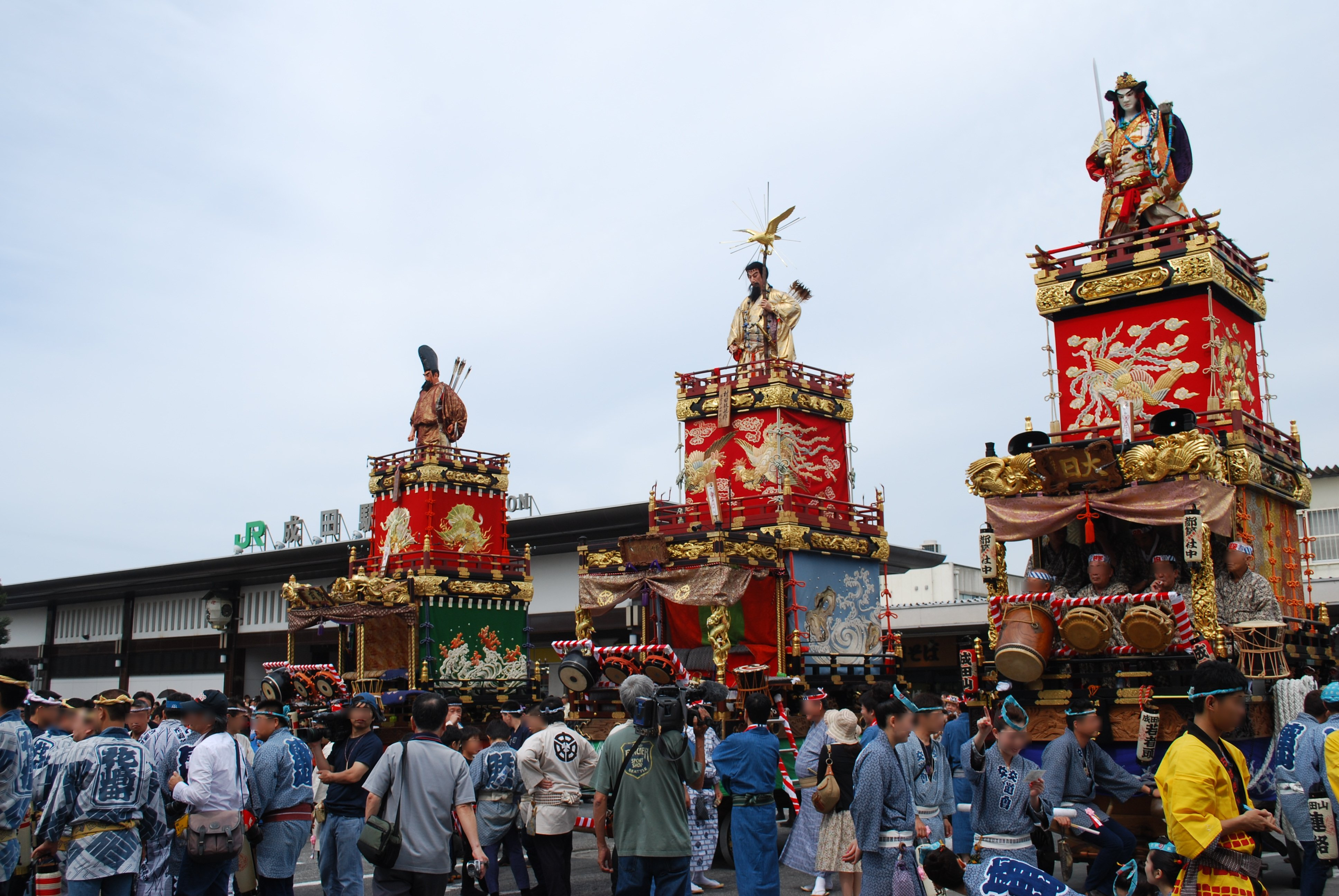
Narita Gion Festival, one of the most famous festivals in Chiba Prefecture, held in July

=== Kōzunomori ===
Kōzunomori is a suburban area of Narita located south of the New Town, about 4 minutes by train from Keisei Narita Station. It has a population of about 12,000. Kōzunomori Station is flanked by a large Ito-Yokado department store.

=== Airport and farm areas ===
Narita International Airport is located on the east side of Narita in a historically agricultural area called Sanrizuka (三里塚). The construction and later expansion of the airport led to intense civil unrest among Sanrizuka residents (see Narita International Airport's history). Although land expropriation and poorer farming conditions due to the airport's construction have caused Narita's farming population to drop two-thirds from pre-airport levels, the area immediately surrounding the airport remains lightly populated by farmers.

=== Industrial areas ===
There are two main industrial zones in Narita: Nogedaira (野毛平) and Toyosumi (豊住). Both zones were laid out in the 1960s to take advantage of Narita Airport and the ability to quickly import and export goods by air. An aircraft part repair plant operated by JAL (Japan Airlines) and Pratt & Whitney, called Japan Turbine Technologies, is located in the Taiei industrial estate.

== Economy ==
Although Narita's economy was historically focused on agriculture, the opening of Narita International Airport refocused the local economy on transportation, logistics and tourism. Most of the airport property is located within Narita City, but many airport hotels and airport-related logistics facilities are in the neighboring towns of Shibayama and Tomisato.

Prologis, FedEx Express, Sagawa Express and several other large logistics firms have major shipping centers in the city.

Nippon Cargo Airlines and Vanilla Air are headquartered on airport property within the city. Spring Airlines Japan is headquartered in the Kozunomori area of the city.

JALways was headquartered in the JAL Operations Center at the airport before merging into JAL in 2010.

== Education ==
=== Schools ===
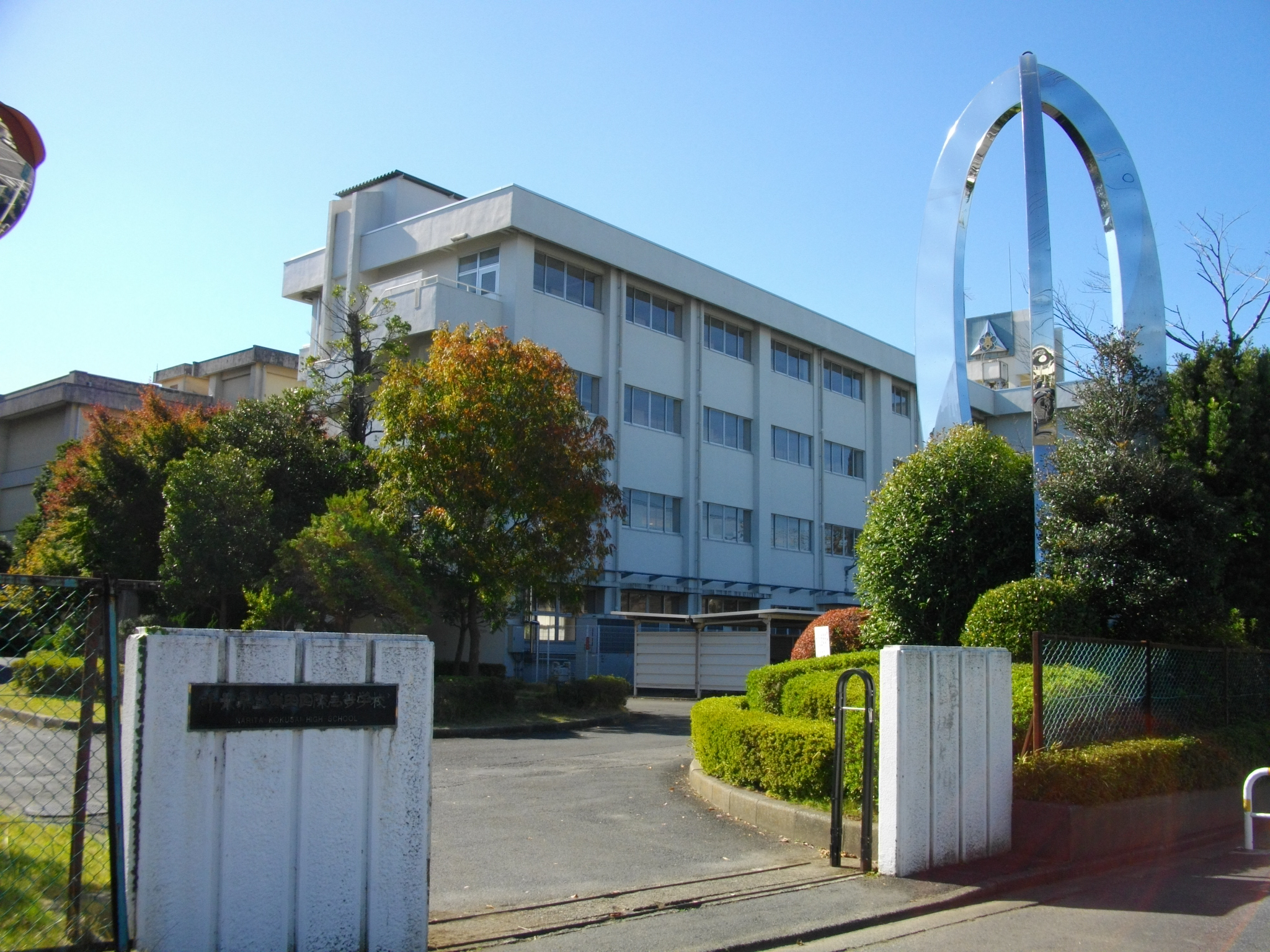
Narita Kokusai High School

Narita has 24 public and one private elementary schools, one public combined elementary/junior high school, and nine public and one private junior high school. The public schools are under the control of the Narita City Board of Education. The city has four public high schools operated by the Chiba Prefectural Board of Education.

- Narita Kokusai High School
- Narita North High School
- Narita Seiryo High School
- Shimofusa High School

Private schools:

- Narita Private Junior and Senior High School (成田高等学校・付属中学校)

=== Public libraries ===
The City of Narita operates the Narita Public Library. In addition each community center includes a library branch.

== Transportation ==
=== Airport ===
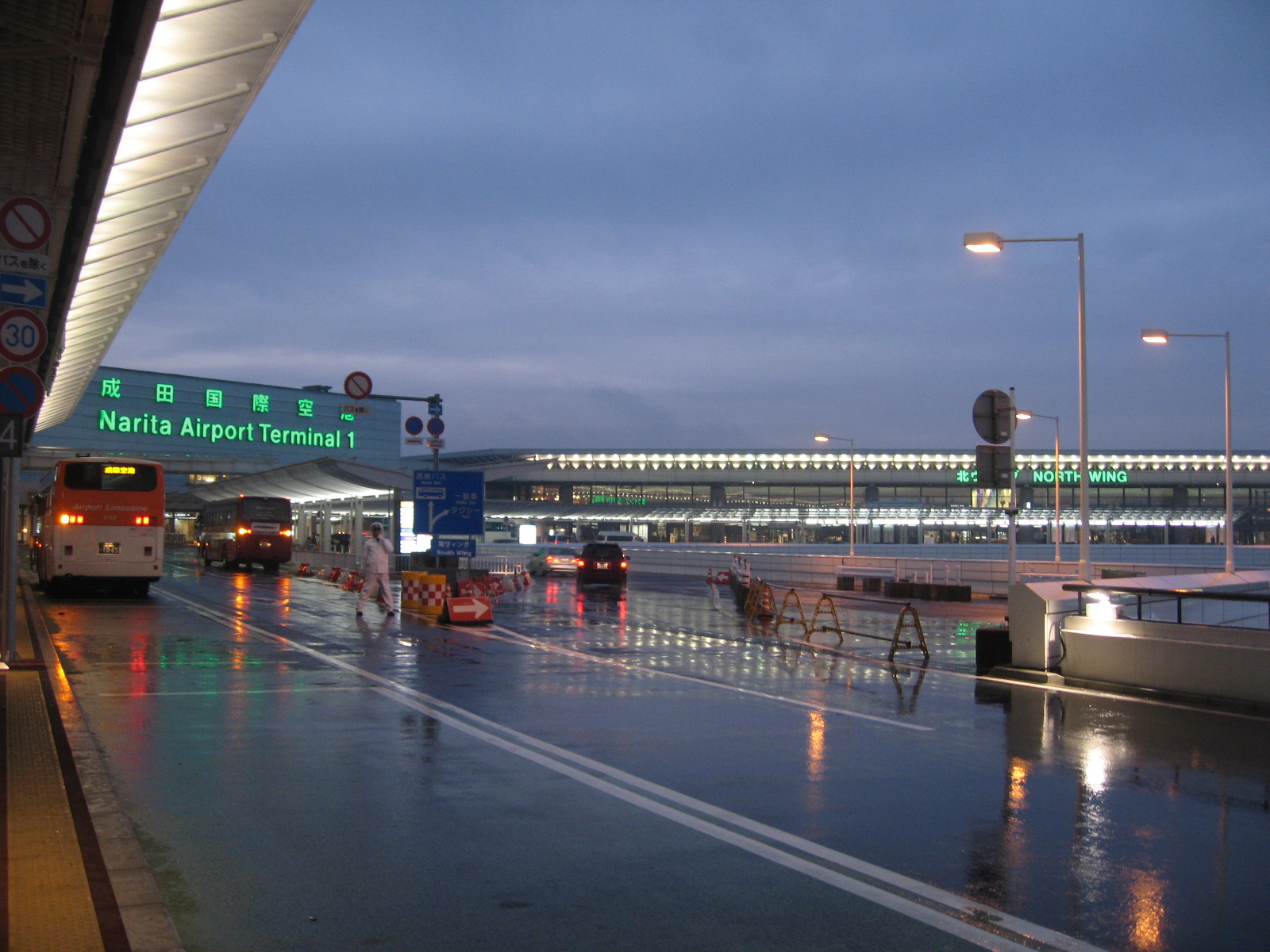
Narita International Airport Terminal One

- Narita International Airport provides domestic and international services.

=== Railway ===
JR East Narita Express trains and Keisei Skyliner trains connect Narita Airport to central Tokyo.

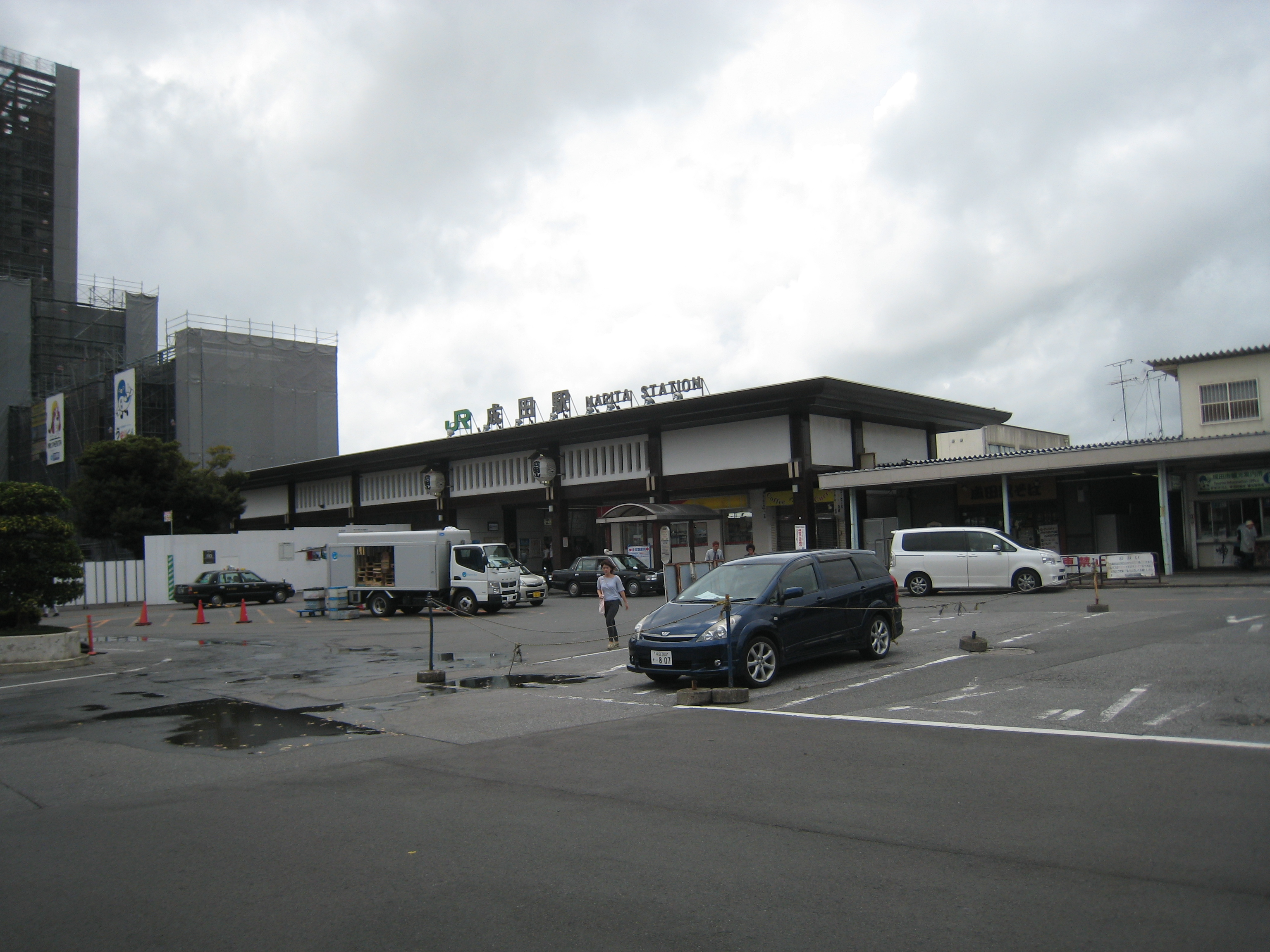
Narita station

JR East – Narita Line

- Narita–Kuzumi–Namegawa

JR East – Narita Line (Abiko branch line)

- Narita–Shimōsa-Manzaki

JR East – Narita Line (Airport branch line)

- Narita–Narita Airport Terminal 2·3–Narita Airport Terminal 1

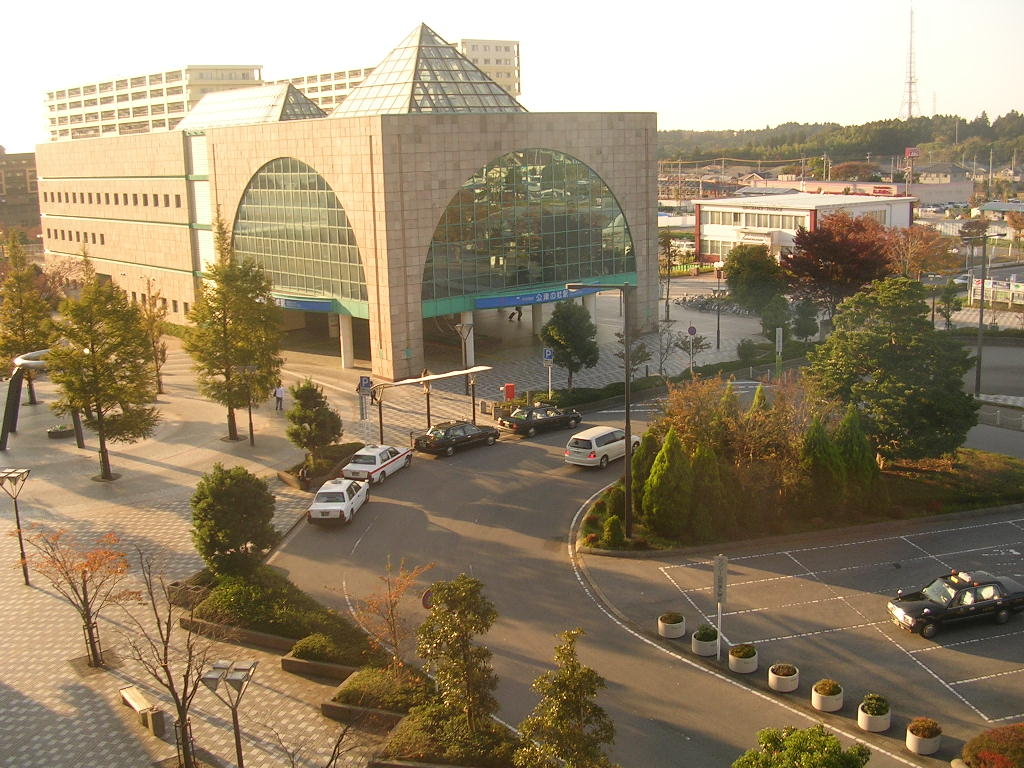
Kōzunomori Station

Keisei Electric Railway: Keisei Main Line

- Kōzunomori–Keisei Narita–Narita Airport Terminal 2·3–Narita Airport Terminal 1

Keisei Electric Railway: Keisei Higashi-Narita Line

- Keisei Narita–Higashi-Narita

Keisei Electric Railway: Keisei Narita Airport Line

- Narita Yukawa–Narita Airport Terminal 2·3–Narita Airport Terminal 1

=== Highway ===
The Higashi-Kantō Expressway connects Narita to Tokyo and Chiba City. Chiba Kotsu and Narita Kuko Kotsu provide bus service through the city. The Narita City Loop Bus, operated by both companies, operates on two circular routes around the city, stopping in major commercial areas and at all major hotels.

- Ken-Ō Expressway
- Higashi-Kantō Expressway
- Shin-Kūkō Expressway
- National Route 51
- National Route 295
- National Route 296
- National Route 356
- National Route 408
- National Route 409
- National Route 464

== Sister cities ==
Narita is twinned with:

- Foxton, New Zealand, since 1995
- San Bruno, United States, since 1990

=== Friendship cities ===
- Jeongeup, North Jeolla, South Korea, since 2002
- Jung District, Incheon, South Korea, since 1998
- Næstved, Denmark, since 2003
- Xianyang, Shaanxi, China, since 1988

== Local attractions ==
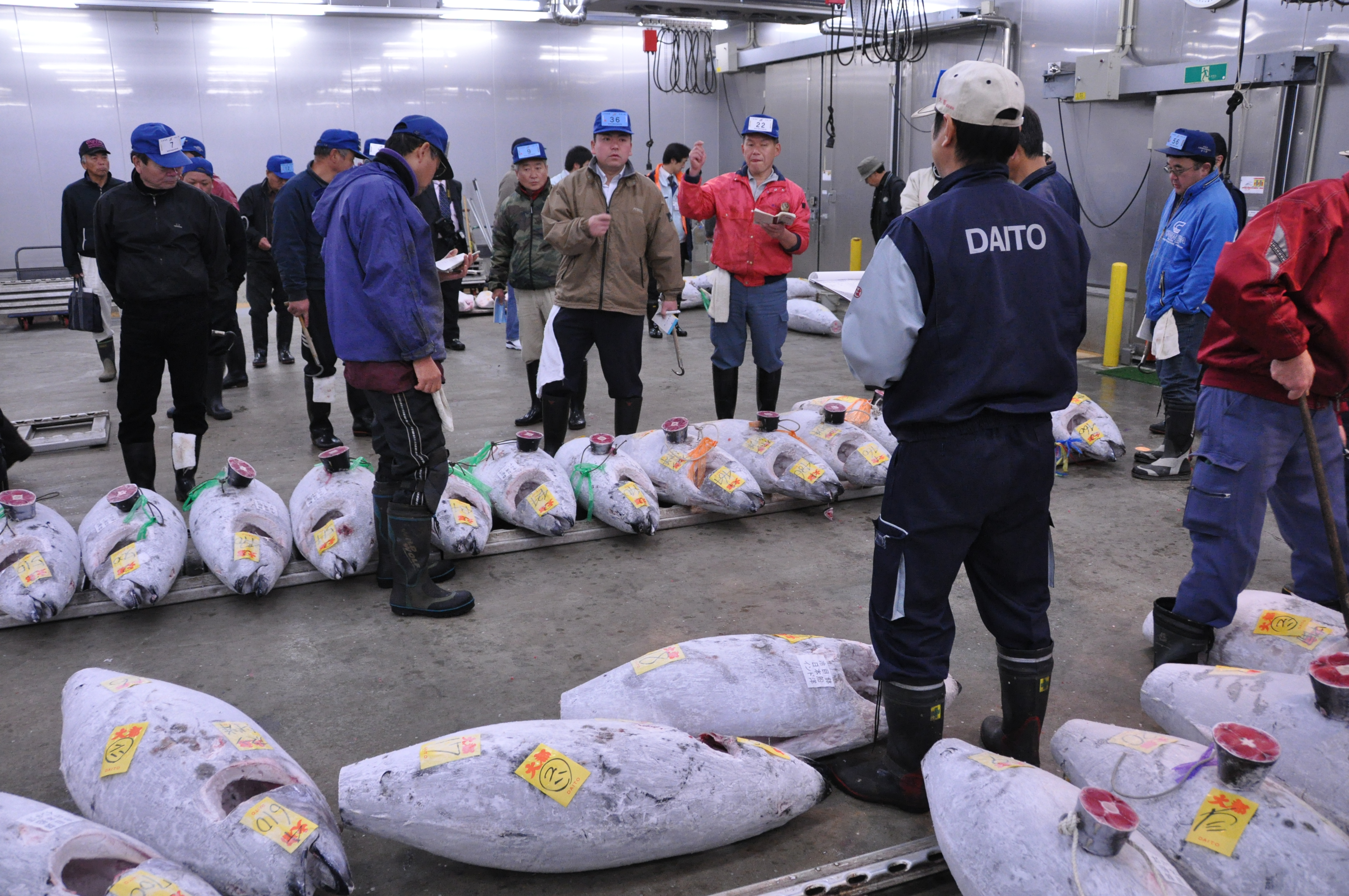
Tuna auction at Narita Wholesale Market

- Chiba Prefectural Boso Fudoki-no-oka Museum
- Narita Peace Pagoda
- Narita-san Shinsho-ji Temple
- Narita Wholesale Market
- Shiseki Park

== Notable people ==
- Yuji Funayama, professional footballer
- Yusuke Igawa, professional footballer
- Yoshio Inaba, actor
- Manabu Iwadate, professional baseball player
- Yuki Karakawa, professional baseball player
- Takeharu Kunimoto, musician
- Yōko Oginome, singer
- Sakura Sōgorō, Edo period folk hero

== See also ==
- Komikado Shrine
