= Japan National Route 129 =

National highway in Japan

National Route 129
- 国道129号

Route information
- Length: 31.7 km (19.7 mi)
- Existed: 1963–present

Major junctions
- South end: National Route 134 in Hiratsuka, Kanagawa
- National Route 1; National Route 246; National Route 412
- North end: National Route 16 in Sagamihara, Kanagawa

Location
- Country: Japan

Highway system
- National highways of Japan; Expressways of Japan
← National Route 128	→ National Route 130

National Route 129 is a national highway of Japan connecting Hiratsuka and Sagamihara in Kanagawa Prefecture in the Kantō region of Japan. It has a total length of 31.7 km (19.7 mi).

== Route description ==
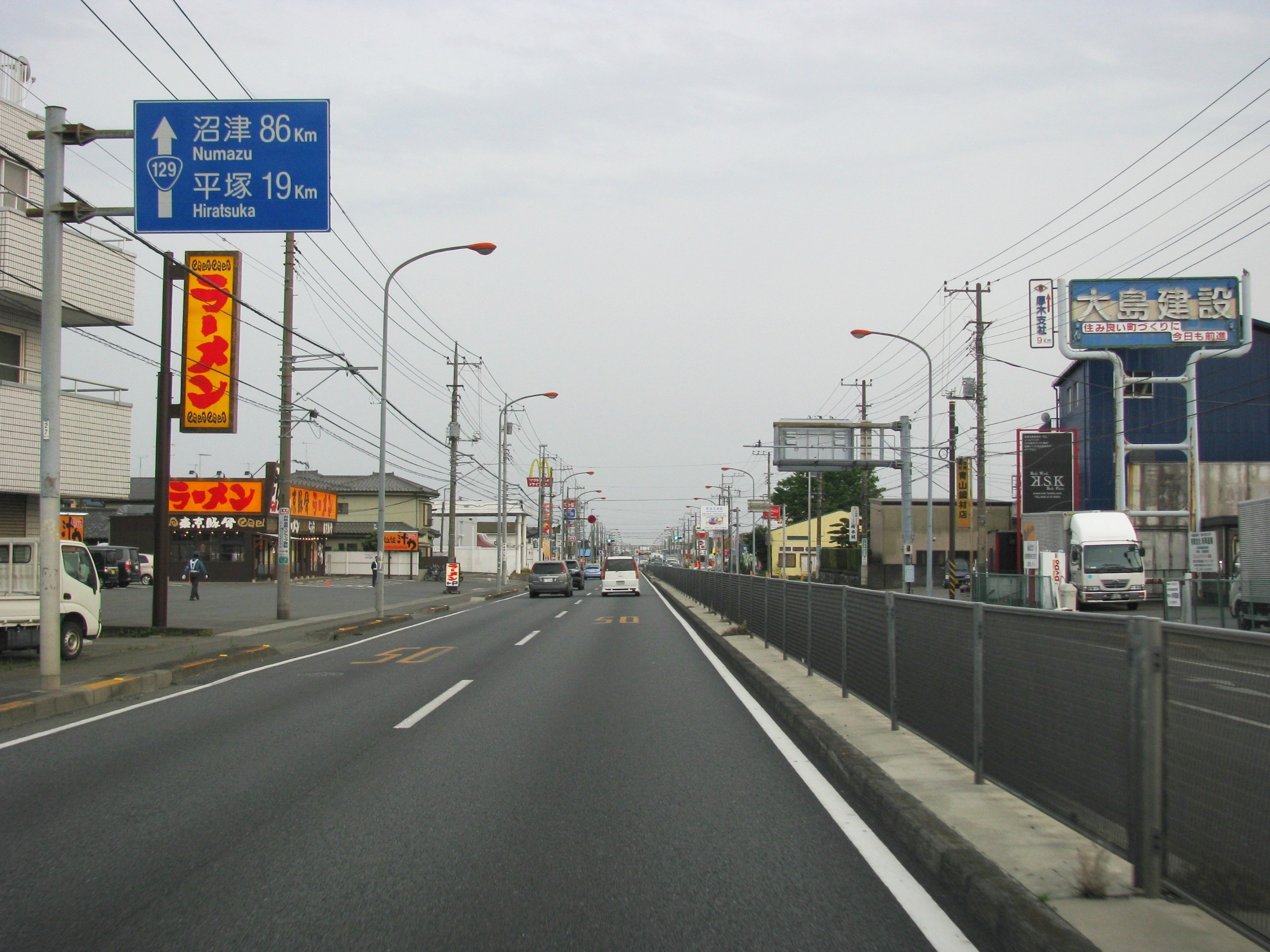
Japan National Route 129 facing south in Atsugi

It has junctions with National Route 16 in Sagamihara, National Routes 412 and 246 in Atsugi, and National Routes 1 and 134 in Hiratsuka. The route runs in a north to south direction and has junctions with some major expressways. These include, two interchanges with the Ken-Ō Expressway, Atsugi Interchange at the Tōmei Expressway and Odawara-Atsugi Road, and Atsugi-minami Interchange at the Shin-Tōmei Expressway.

== History ==
Route 129 was originally designated on 18 May 1953 from Yokohama to Chiba as a loop around Tokyo. This was redesignated (along with a section of Route 127) as Route 16 on 1 April 1963 and the current Route 129 was designated the same day.

== List of major junctions ==
The entire route is in Kanagawa Prefecture.

Location	km	mi	Destinations	Notes
Hiratsuka	0.0	0.0	National Route 134	Southern terminus
Hiratsuka	0.6	0.37	Kanagawa Prefecture Route 607	
Hiratsuka	1.7	1.1	National Route 1	
Hiratsuka	4.3	2.7	Kanagawa Prefecture Route 44 (Shonan New Way) east	
Hiratsuka	6.7	4.2	Kanagawa Prefecture Route 44 (Shonan New Way)	
Atsugi	9.9	6.2	Kanagawa Prefecture Route 22	
Atsugi	10.1	6.3	Shin-Tōmei Expressway	E1A exit 2 (Atsugi-minami Interchange)
Atsugi	10.9	6.8	Kanagawa Prefecture Route 601 north	
Atsugi	11.1	6.9	Kanagawa Prefecture Route 604	
Atsugi	11.5	7.1	Odawara-Atsugi Road; Tōmei Expressway	E1 Exit 5 (Atsugi Interchange), no exit number assigned to E85; no access to westbound E85
Atsugi	12.5	7.8	Kanagawa Prefecture Route 63 south	
Atsugi	13.3	8.3	National Route 246 west	National Route 246 merges into Route 129; southern end of National Route 246 concurrency
Atsugi	14.3	8.9	Kanagawa Prefecture Route 603	
Atsugi	15.0	9.3	Kanagawa Prefecture Route 60	
Atsugi	15.6	9.7	Kanagawa Prefecture Route 43 south	
Atsugi	17.3	10.7	National Route 246 east	Northern end of National Route 246 concurrency
Atsugi	18.5	11.5	Ken-Ō Expressway	C4 Exit 32 (Ken-Ō-Atsugi Interchange)
Atsugi	19.7	12.2	Kanagawa Prefecture Route 42	
Atsugi	21.2	13.2	Kanagawa Prefecture Route 65 west	
Atsugi	23.4	14.5	Kanagawa Prefecture Route 511	
Sagamihara	24.3	15.1	Ken-Ō Expressway	C4 Exit 33 (Sagamihara-Aikawa Interchange)
Sagamihara	25.4	15.8	Kanagawa Prefecture Route 508 south	Southern end of Kanagawa Prefecture Route 508 concurrency
Sagamihara	26.0	16.2	Kanagawa Prefecture Route 508 north	Northern end of Kanagawa Prefecture Route 508 concurrency
Sagamihara	28.0	17.4	Kanagawa Prefecture Route 54	
Sagamihara	31.5	19.6	National Route 16 (Tokyo Kanjo Avenue)	Northern terminus
1.000 mi = 1.609 km; 1.000 km = 0.621 mi: Concurrency terminus; Incomplete access
