= Japan National Route 297 =

National highway in Japan

National Route 297
- 国道297号
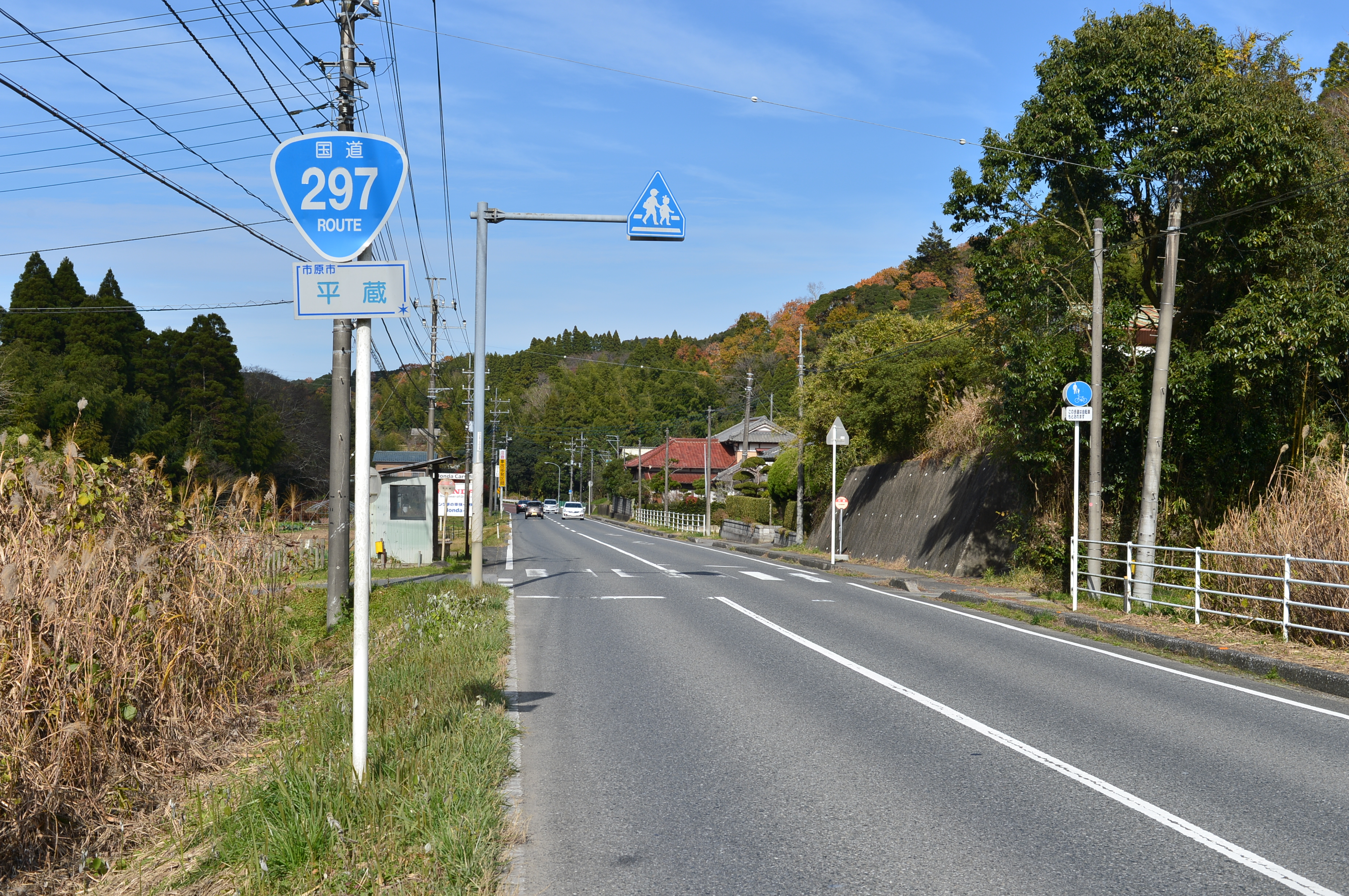

Route information
- Length: 107.0 km (66.5 mi)
- Existed: 1 April 1970–present

Major junctions
- North end: National Route 16 in Ichihara, Chiba
- South end: National Route 128 / National Route 410 in Tateyama, Chiba

Location
- Country: Japan

Highway system
- National highways of Japan; Expressways of Japan
← National Route 296	→ National Route 298

National Route 297 is a national highway of Japan connecting Tateyama, Chiba and Ichihara, Chiba in Japan, with a total length of 107 km (66.49 mi).
