= Manabu Iwadate =

Japanese baseball player (born 1981)

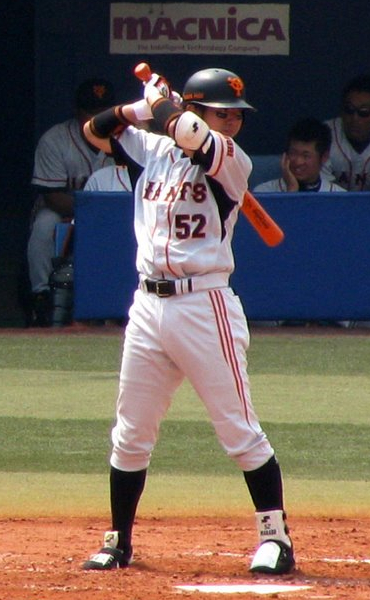
- Iwadate batting for the Yomiuri Giants' farm team in 2008.

Hokkaido Nippon-Ham Fighters – No. 84
- Infielder / Coach
- Born: April 14, 1981 (age 44); Narita, Chiba, Japan
- Batted: Right Threw: Right

NPB debut
- October 9, 2004, for the Yomiuri Giants

Last NPB appearance
- July 1, 2012, for the Hokkaido Nippon-Ham Fighters

NPB statistics (through 2012 season)
- Batting average: .178
- Hits: 19
- RBIs: 10

Teams
- As player: Yomiuri Giants (2004–2009); Hokkaido Nippon-Ham Fighters (2010–2013); As coach: Hokkaido Nippon-Ham Fighters (2024–present)
- Last updated on: January 7, 2024

Manabu Iwadate (岩舘 学, Iwadate Manabu; born April 14, 1981) is a Japanese professional baseball manager and former infielder who is a coach for the Hokkaido Nippon-Ham Fighters of Nippon Professional Baseball. He played for the Yomiuri Giants and the Fighters during his playing career.
