= Japan National Route 296 =

Road in Chiba prefecture, Japan

National Route 296
- 国道296号
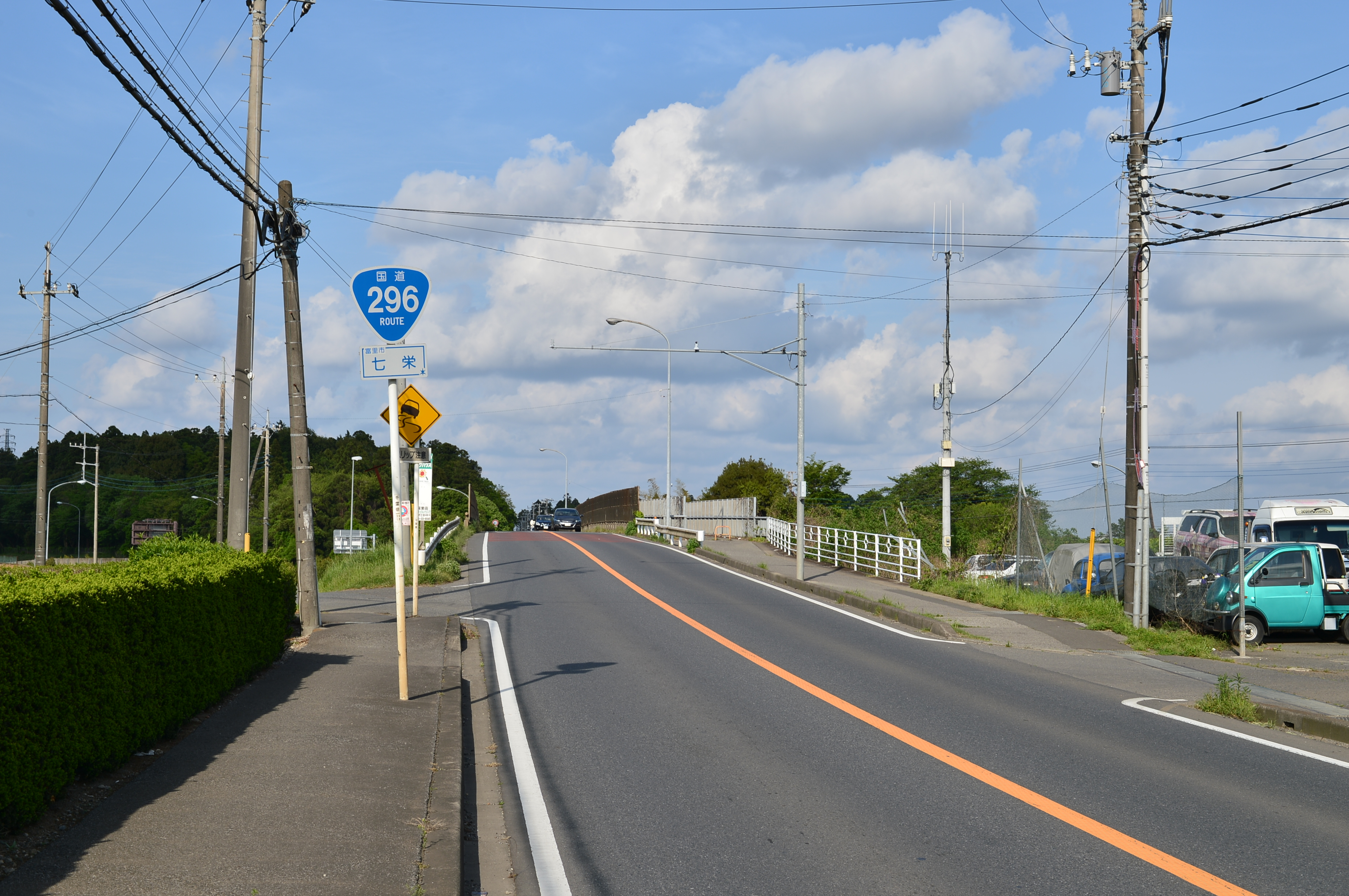

Route information
- Length: 59.0 km (36.7 mi)
- Existed: 1 April 1970–present

Major junctions
- West end: National Route 14 at Funabashi, Chiba
- National Route 16; National Route 51; National Route 409
- East end: National Route 126 at Sōsa, Chiba

Location
- Country: Japan

Highway system
- National highways of Japan; Expressways of Japan
← National Route 295	→ National Route 297

National Route 296 is a national highway of Japan connecting Sōsa, Chiba and Funabashi, Chiba in Japan, with a total length of 59 km (36.66 mi).

National Route 296 was first constructed on April 1, 1970
