= Japan National Route 295 =

Road in Chiba prefecture, Japan

National Route 295
- 国道295号
- Airport Road (空港通り, Kūkō-dōri)
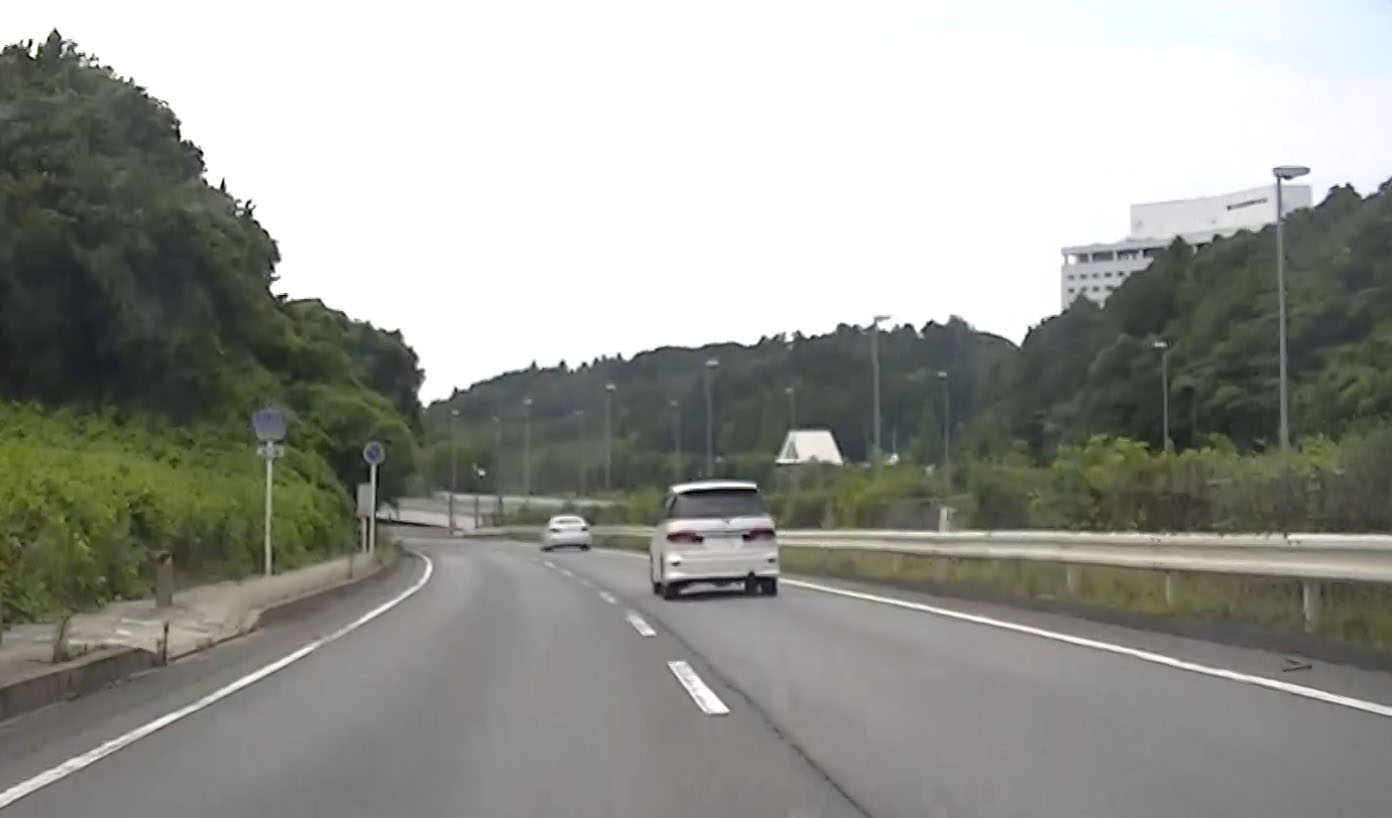

Route information
- Length: 5.8 km (3.6 mi)
- Existed: 1 April 1970–present

Major junctions
- East end: Narita International Airport
- West end: National Route 51 in Narita, Chiba

Location
- Country: Japan

Highway system
- National highways of Japan; Expressways of Japan
← National Route 294	→ National Route 296

National Route 295 is a national highway of Japan connecting Narita International Airport and Narita, Chiba in Japan, with a total length of 5.8 km (3.6 mi). It is known locally as Airport Road (空港通り, Kūkō-dōri).
