= Japan National Route 16 =

National highway in Japan

National Route 16
- 国道16号

Route information
- Length: 241.0 km (149.8 mi)
- Existed: 4 December 1952–present

Major junctions
- Beltway around Tokyo
- CCW end: National Route 1 in Nishi-ku, Yokohama
- CW end: National Route 1 in Nishi-ku, Yokohama

Location
- Country: Japan

Highway system
- National highways of Japan; Expressways of Japan
← National Route 15	→ National Route 17

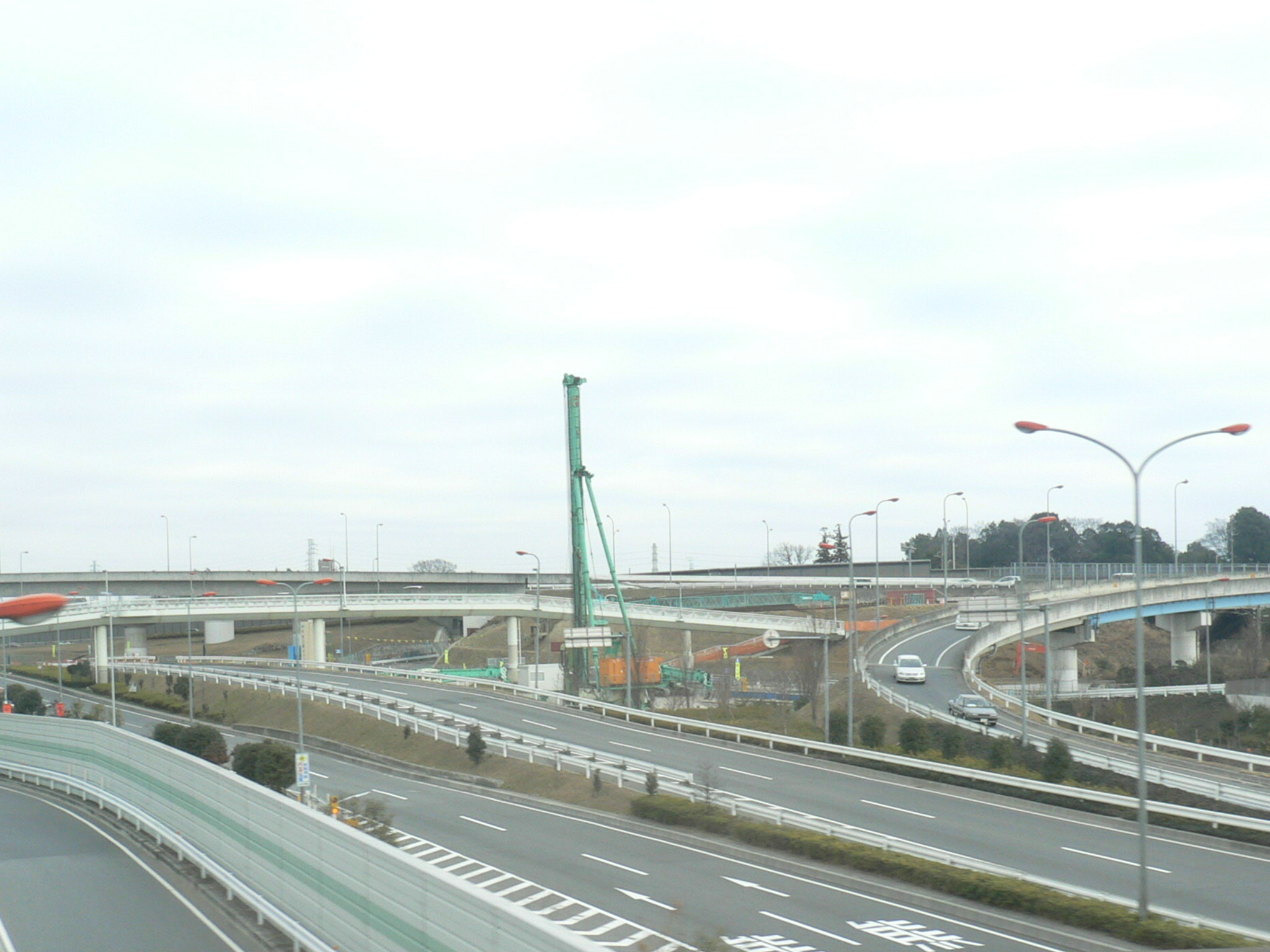
Interchange on Route 16

National Route 16 (国道16号, Kokudō Jūroku-gō) is a national highway in Japan. A beltway around Tokyo, it links the major prefectural capital cities of Yokohama (in Kanagawa Prefecture), Saitama (in Saitama Prefecture), and Chiba (in Chiba Prefecture) as well as Hachiōji (in Tokyo). It also serves Yokosuka and Sagamihara (in Kanagawa Prefecture), Kasukabe (in Saitama Prefecture), and Kisarazu (in Chiba Prefecture). The total length is 241 km.

Along with the Ken-Ō Expressway, Route 16 connects the entire length of the Technology Advanced Metropolitan Area (TAMA) Network region - an inland industrial area covering an area of 3000 km^{2}, covering 74 municipalities and home to over 10 million people of whom 4 million work in the TAMA Network firms. In 1998 goods shipped from TAMA had twice the shipment value of the Silicon Valley.

== History ==
Before 1963, the route did not follow a loop, but ran from Futtsu to Yokosuka to Yokohama. The Yokosuka-Yokohama section was designated as National Highway 45 on 8 July 1887 and became National Highway 31 in 1920 and Route 16 in 1952. On 1 April 1963, Route 16 was extended to Kisarazu, replacing a portion of Route 127 and all of Route 129 when these sections were promoted to Class 1 highways, forming the current route around Tokyo.

== Route data ==
- Length: 241 km (150 mi)
- Origin and Terminus: Nishi-ku, Yokohama (originates and ends at junction with Route 1)
- Major cities: Yokosuka, Sagamihara, Hachiōji, Kawagoe, Saitama, Kasukabe, Kashiwa, Chiba and Kisarazu
