= Shin-Kiba =

Area in Kōtō, Tokyo, Japan

Coordinates: 35.6383855°N 139.8270869°E

Shin-Kiba (新木場) is an area of Kōtō, Tokyo, Japan. It is located north of Wakasu, east of Tatsumi, south of Yumenoshima, and west of the Arakawa River. It is built on reclaimed land.

== Etymology ==
The name "Shinkiba" means "New Lumberyard", and is taken from the area's historical importance in the lumber industry. It is termed "New" to distinguish it from Kiba (Lumberyard), another area in Koto.

== History ==
Kiba had been the main centre of the lumber industry in Tokyo since 1657, when the Tokugawa shogunate moved it there after a major fire. In the 1970s Kiba was rapidly being developed, so the lumber businesses were relocated to reclaimed land named Shin-Kiba. In more recent times performance venues have been established in Shin-Kiba.

== Transportation ==
- Shin-kiba Station (Yurakucho Line, Keiyo Line, Rinkai Line)
- Tokyo Heliport

== Event spaces ==
- AgeHa nightclub.
- Shin-Kiba 1st Ring arena.
- Shin-Kiba Studio Coast.

== Public facilities ==
- Shin-Kiba Park

== Schools ==
Koto Ward Board of Education operates public elementary and junior high schools.

Minamisuna Elementary School (南砂小学校) is the zoned public elementary school for Shin-Kiba.

Minamisuna Junior High School (南砂中学校) is the zoned public junior high school for Shin-Kiba.
