= Shurin =

Shurin may refer to:

== People ==
- Aaron Shurin (b. 1947), American writer
- Dov Shurin (b. 1949), Israeli singer-songwriter
- Susan Shurin, American doctor

== Places ==
- Shurin, Iran, a village in Hamadan Province, Iran
- Shurin, Syria, a village in Aleppo Governorate, Syria

== See also ==
- Shurin College of Foreign Languages
