= Tatsumi, Tokyo =

Area in Kōtō, Tokyo, Japan

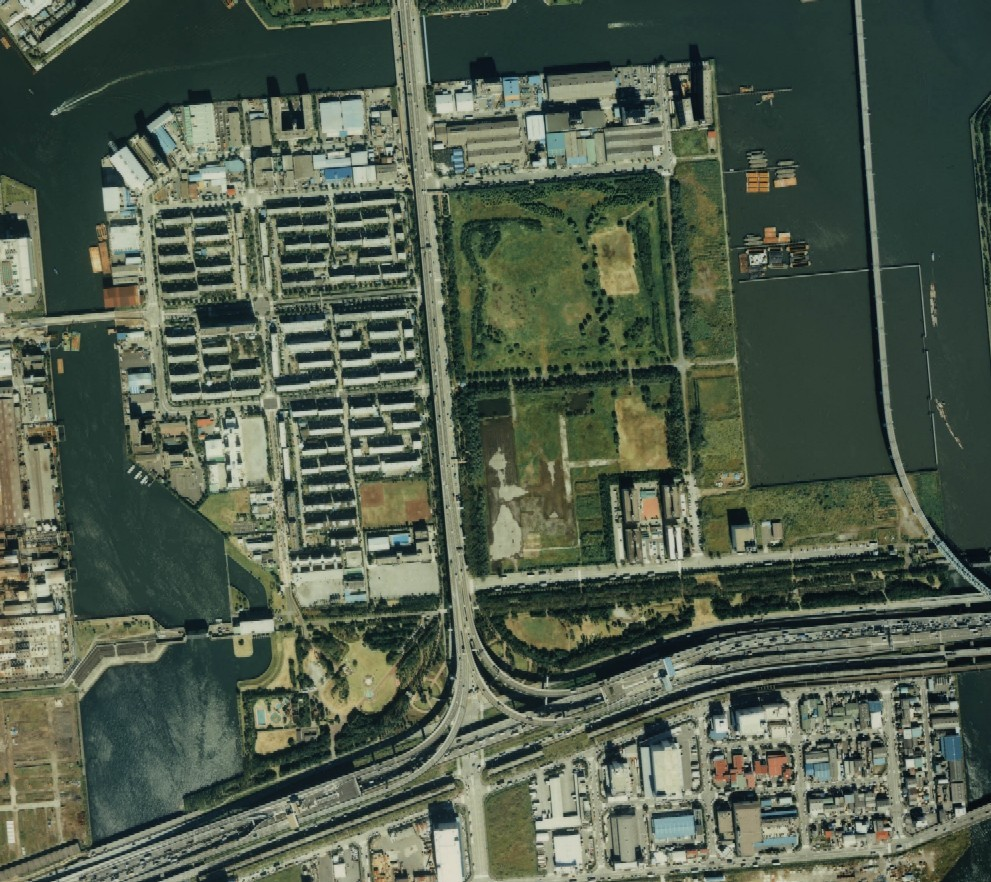
Tatsumi

Tatsumi (辰巳) is an area of Koto, Tokyo, Japan. It is surrounded by water on all sides, but is joined by bridges to Shiomi to the north, Shin-Kiba and Yumenoshima to the east, and Shinonome to the west. The west side is largely residential, the east largely consists of parks. It is built on reclaimed land.

== Etymology ==
The name "Tatsumi" means "South East", and is taken from the area's direction from the Tokyo Imperial Palace.

== History ==
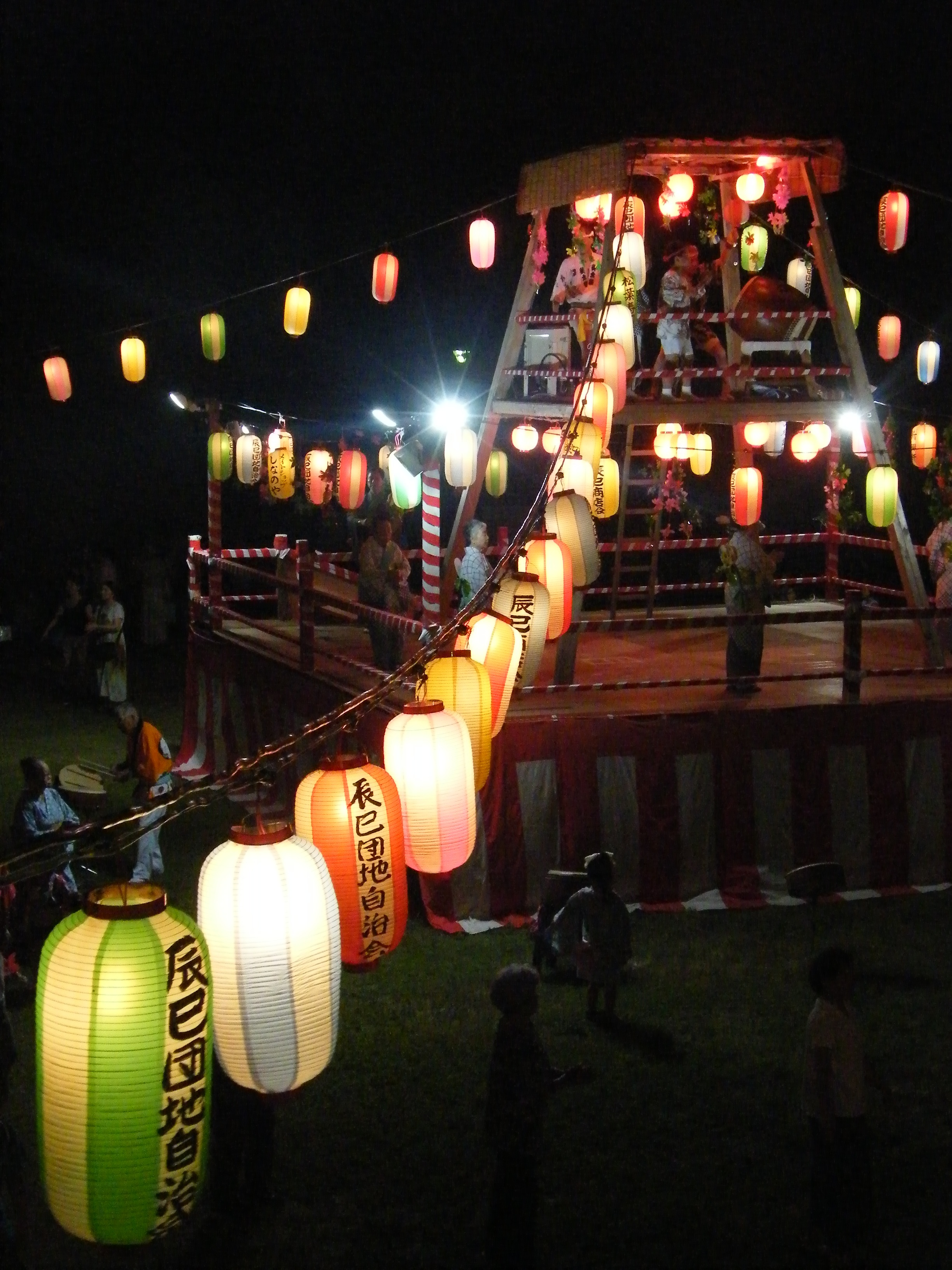
The yagura at the Summer Festival at Tatsumi on July 31, 2015.

The swimming events for the 2020 Summer Olympics were held in Tatsumi at the Tokyo Tatsumi International Swimming Center.

== Transportation ==
- Tatsumi Station (Yurakucho Line)

== Organizations ==
- Japanese Red Cross Tatsumi Building
- WOWOW Broadcasting Center

== Public facilities ==
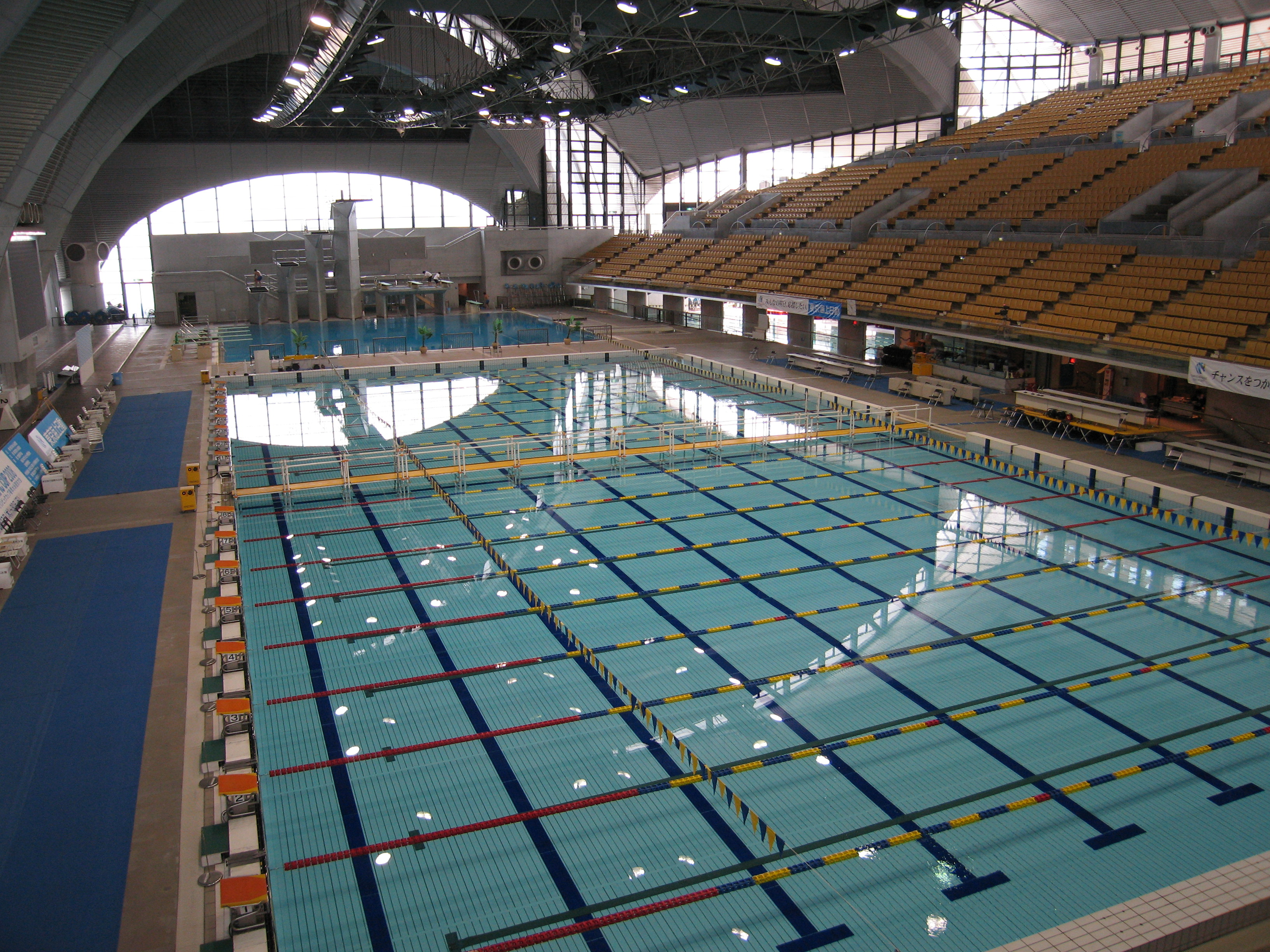
Tokyo Tatsumi International Swimming Center

- Tokyo Tatsumi International Swimming Center
- Tatsumi Seaside Park
- Tatsumi No Mori Green Park

== Schools ==
Koto Ward Board of Education operates public elementary and junior high schools.

Tatsumi Elementary School (辰巳小学校) and Number Two Tatsumi Elementary School (第二辰巳小学校) are zoned public elementary schools for different parts of Tatsumi. All of Tatsumi is zoned to Tatsumi Junior High School (辰巳中学校).

Schools in Tatsumi:

- Tatsumi Elementary School
- Number Two Tatsumi Elementary School
- Tatsumi Junior High School

== Residences ==
- Tatsumi 1-chome Apartments
