= Shinonome Station (Tokyo) =

Railway station in Tokyo, Japan

R02 Shinonome Station 東雲駅
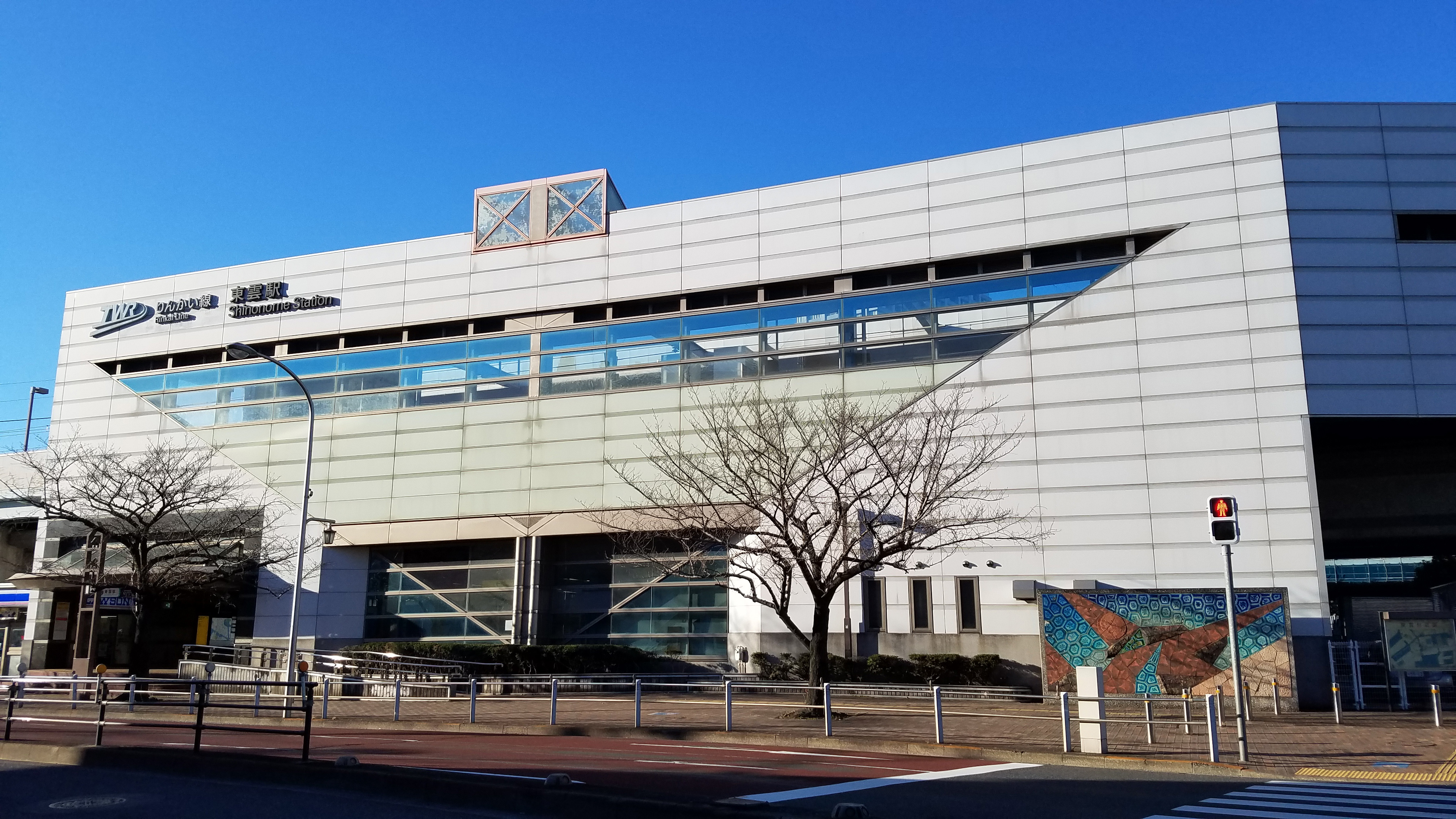
- Shinonome Station east side, January 2022

General information
- Location: Kōtō, Tokyo; Japan
- Coordinates: 35°38′26″N 139°48′12″E
- Operator: Tokyo Waterfront Area Rapid Transit
- Line: Rinkai Line
- Distance: 2.18 km (1.35 mi) from Shin-Kiba
- Platforms: 2 side platforms
- Tracks: 2

Construction
- Structure type: Elevated

Other information
- Station code: R02

History
- Opened: 30 March 1996; 30 years ago

Passengers
- FY2024: 7,386 daily
- Rank: 8 out of 8

Services
Preceding station	Tokyo Waterfront Area Rapid Transit	Following station
Kokusai-Tenjijō R03 towards Ōsaki	Rinkai Line	Shin-Kiba R01 Terminus
Location
- Location within Special wards of Tokyo Location within Tokyo Location within Japan

Shinonome Station (Japanese: 東雲駅, Hepburn: Shinonome-eki) is a railway station on the Rinkai Line in Shinonome, Tokyo, Japan, operated by Tokyo Waterfront Area Rapid Transit (TWR). The station is 2.18 kilometres (1.35 mi) from the line's starting point at Shin-Kiba.

The station has two elevated side platforms serving two tracks. Shinonome is the only station on the Rinkai Line with side platforms and, along with Ōsaki and Shin-Kiba, is one of the line's few stations located above ground. The station uses side platforms because it was added onto an elevated structure that had already been largely completed for the unfinished Keiyō Freight Line built by the former Japanese National Railways.

Shinonome had an average daily ridership of 7,386 passengers in fiscal year 2024, the lowest among the eight stations on the Rinkai Line.

== History ==
Shinonome Station was not included in the original construction plan for the line. It was added following a petition from Koto Ward. The Ministry of Transport approved the station's construction on 31 March 1993.

The station opened on 30 March 1996, concurrently with the opening of the line's initial section between Shin-Kiba and Tokyo Teleport.

Station numbering was introduced on the Rinkai Line in 2016, with Shinonome assigned the station number R02.

== Surrounding area ==
Shinonome is a developed area of Tokyo Bay reclaimed land in Koto Ward. The area surrounding the station was historically dominated by industrial and logistics facilities. Development north of National Route 357 brought commercial facilities to the area, followed by extensive residential development, including high-rise apartment buildings, from the 2000s onward.

Nearby facilities include:

- Tatsumi Station on the Tokyo Metro Yurakucho Line
- Ariake Junior College of Education and the Arts
- Shinonome Water Park
- National Route 357
- Shuto Expressway Bayshore Route
- Tokyo Ariake University of Medical and Health Sciences
- Kaetsu Ariake Junior and Senior High School
