= Kokusai-Tenjijō Station =

Railway station in Tokyo, Japan

R03 Kokusai-Tenjijō Station 国際展示場駅
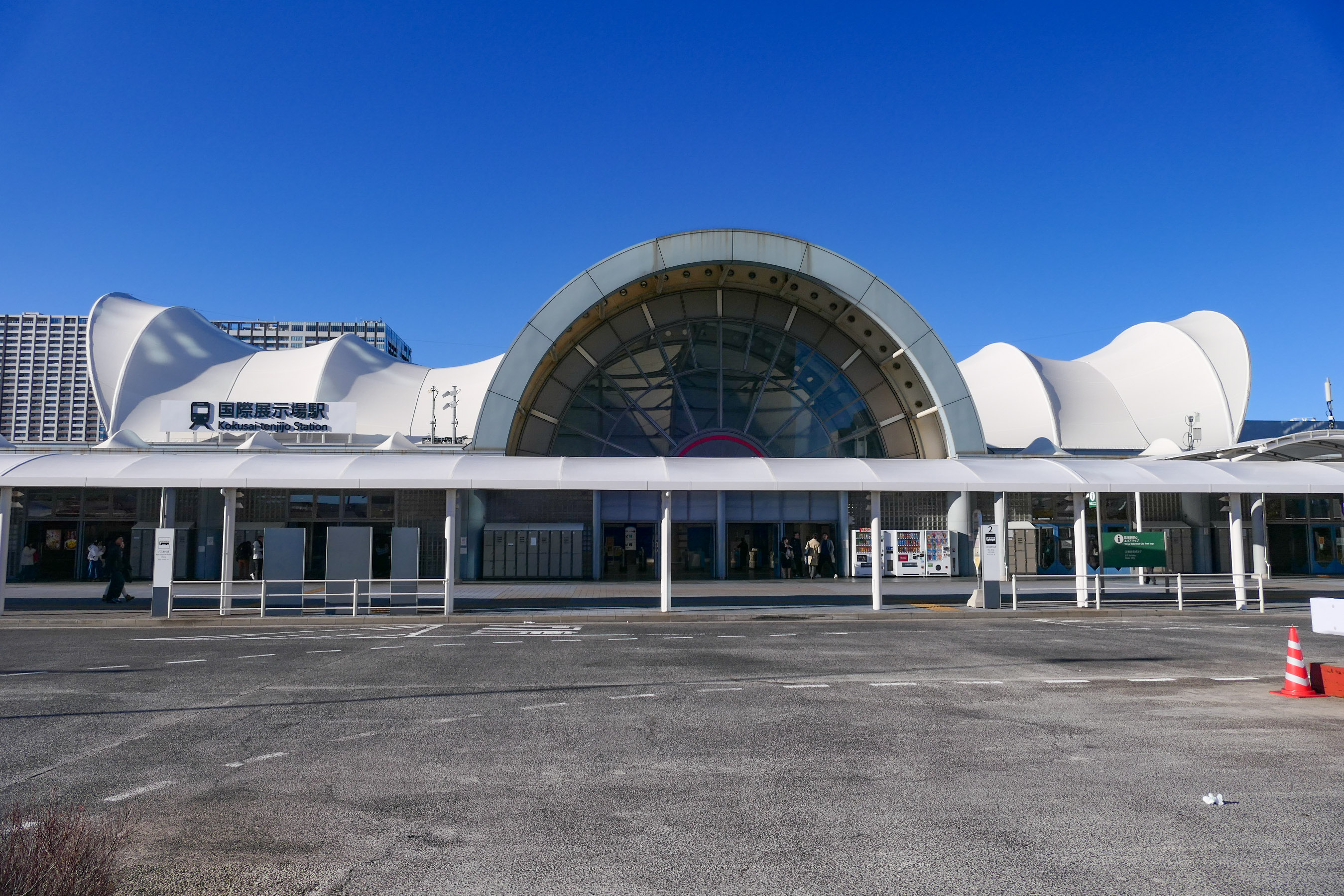
- Kokusai-Tenjijō Station, January 2025

General information
- Location: Kōtō, Tokyo; Japan
- Coordinates: 35°38′04″N 139°47′30″E
- Operator: Tokyo Waterfront Area Rapid Transit
- Line: Rinkai Line
- Distance: 3.51 km (2.18 mi) from Shin-Kiba
- Platforms: 1 island platform
- Tracks: 2
- Connections: Yurikamome (Ariake: U-12); Tokyo BRT (Kokusai-Tenjijō: B-05)

Construction
- Structure type: Underground

Other information
- Station code: R-03

History
- Opened: 30 March 1996; 30 years ago

Passengers
- FY2024: 35,085 daily
- Rank: 3 out of 8

Services
Preceding station	Tokyo Waterfront Area Rapid Transit	Following station
Tokyo Teleport R04 towards Ōsaki	Rinkai Line	Shinonome R02 towards Shin-Kiba
Location
- Location within Special wards of Tokyo Location within Tokyo Location within Japan

Kokusai-Tenjijō Station (Japanese: 国際展示場駅, Hepburn: Kokusai-Tenjijō-eki; lit. 'International Exhibition Centre Station') is a railway station on the Rinkai Line in Kōtō, Tokyo, Japan, operated by Tokyo Waterfront Area Rapid Transit (TWR). The station serves the Tokyo Big Sight exhibition centre, after which it is named. Its station number is R-03. Opened on 30 March 1996, the station is located within walking distance of Ariake Station on the Yurikamome, an automated transit line. The station is also near a large bus plaza that serves as a stop on the Tokyo BRT line.

== Lines ==
Kokusai-Tenjijō Station is served by the Rinkai Line from Ōsaki to Shin-Kiba. The station is situated between Tokyo Teleport and Shinonome stations, and is 3.51 kilometres (2.18 mi) from the starting point of the Rinkai Line at Shin-Kiba.

== Station layout ==
The station has a single underground island platform serving two tracks.

Chest-height platform edge doors were installed during fiscal 2018.

== Artwork by Osamu Tezuka ==
In 2019, a 2.6-by-8.8-metre (8 ft 6 in by 28 ft 10 in) ceramic relief by Manga artist Osamu Tezuka was permanently installed. It was produced by the ceramic studio CREARE Atami-Yugawara Studio which spent roughly ten months creating this artwork.

== History ==
The station opened on 30 March 1996, concurrently with the opening of the line's initial section between Shin-Kiba and Tokyo Teleport.

Station numbering was introduced in 2016 with Kokusai-Tenjijō being assigned station number R03.

== Passenger statistics ==
In fiscal 2014, the station was used by an average of 33,308 passengers daily (boarding passengers only), making it the third busiest station on the Rinkai Line, after Osaki and Oimachi.

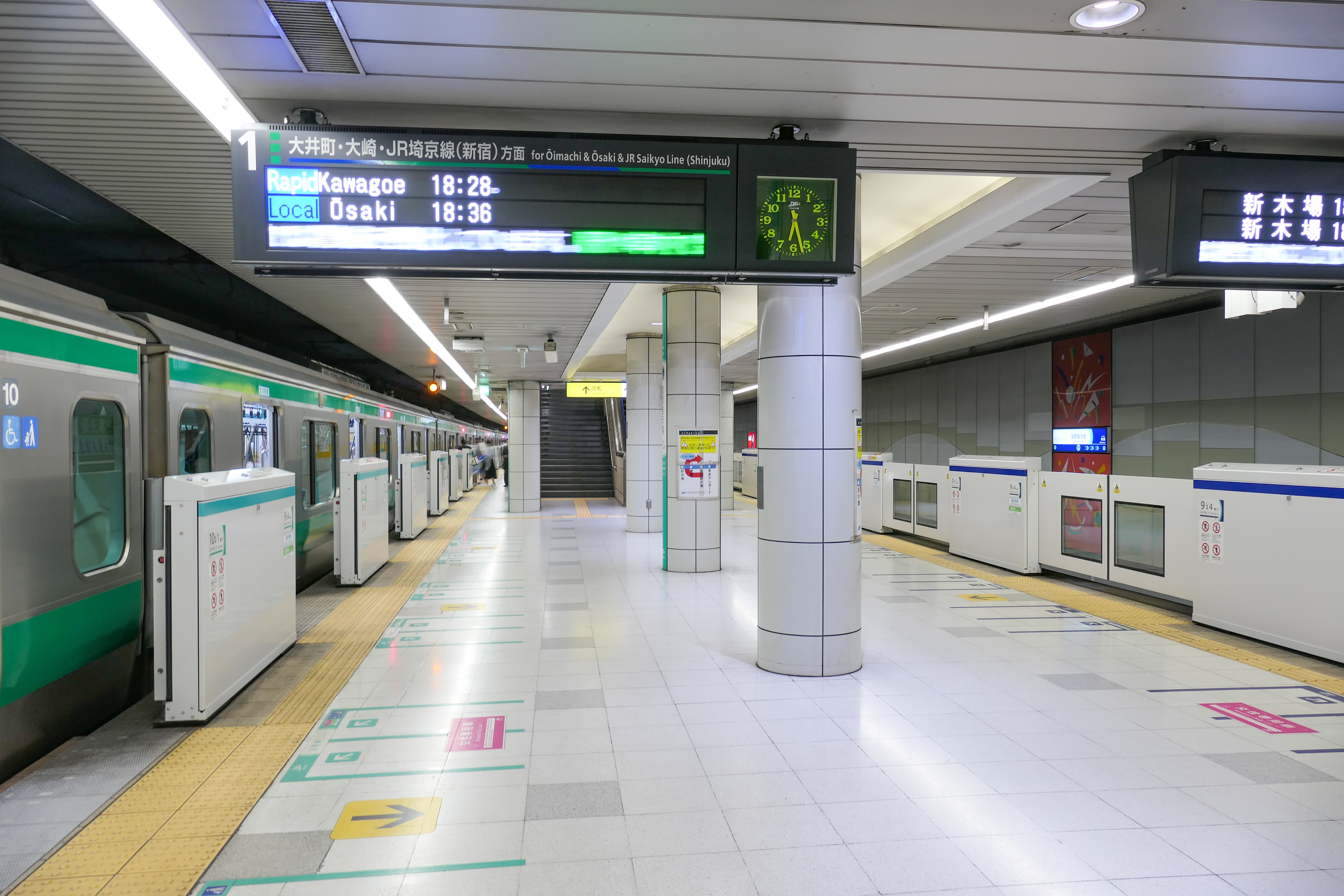
The platforms, March 2022

== Surrounding area ==
- Ariake Station (Yurikamome)
- Tokyo Big Sight
- Panasonic Centre Tokyo
- Japanese Foundation For Cancer Research Hospital
- Tokyo Fashion Town ("TFT")
- Ariake Coliseum
- Musashino University

=== Hotels ===
- DoubleTree Tokyo Ariake
- Tokyo Bay Ariake Washington Hotel
- Hotel Sunroute Ariake

== See also ==
- List of railway stations in Japan
