= Kōtō =

Kōtō 江東区
- Special ward
- Kōtō City
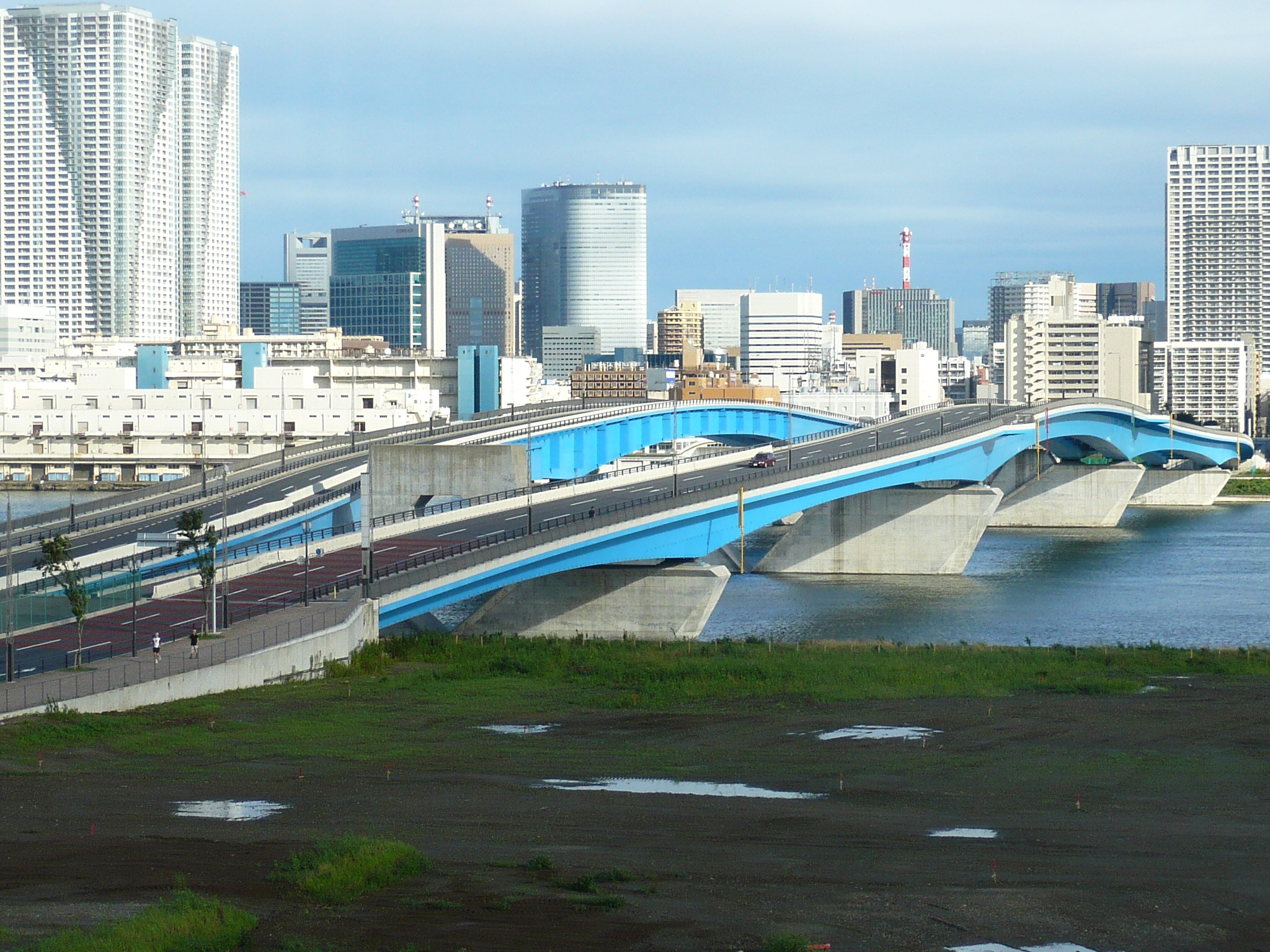
- Great Harumi Bridge in Kōtō

- Flag Emblem

- Location of Kōtō in Tokyo

- Location in Japan
- Coordinates: 35°40′N 139°49′E
- Country: Japan
- Region: Kantō
- Prefecture: Tokyo

Government
  - Mayor: Tomoka Okubo (from December 11, 2023)

Area
  - Total: 42.99 km^{2} (16.60 sq mi)

Population (May 1, 2025)
  - Total: 543,730
  - Density: 12,648/km^{2} (32,760/sq mi)
- Time zone: UTC+09:00 (JST)
- City office: 4-11-28 Toyo, Koto City, Tokyo, Japan; 135-8383
- Website: www.city.koto.lg.jp (in Japanese)

Kōtō (江東区, Kōtō-ku; Japanese pronunciation: [kò̞ó̞.tó̞ó̞, -tó̞ò̞.kɯ̈̀, kó̞ó̞-]) is a special ward in the Tokyo Metropolis in Japan. It is known as Kōtō City in English. As of May 1, 2025, the ward has an estimated population of 543,730, and a population density of 12,648/km^{2} (32,760/sq mi). The total area is 42.99 km^{2} (16.60 sq mi).

Kōtō is east of the Tokyo metropolitan center, bounded by the Sumida River to the west and the Arakawa River to the east. Its major districts include Kameido, Kiba, Kiyosumi, Monzen-nakachō, Shirakawa, and Toyosu. The waterfront area of Ariake is in Kōtō, as is part of Odaiba, Ojima.

== Etymology ==
Kōtō (江東) means "East [of the] River" in Japanese. The tō (東) in Kōtō means "east" and is the same character as the Tō in Tōkyō (東京).

== Geography ==
Kōtō is on the waterfront of Tokyo Bay, sandwiched between the wards of Chūō and Edogawa. To the north, its inland boundary is with the Sumida special ward. Much of the land in northern Kōtō is old reclaimed land, and the elevation is very low (below sea level). The southern part is relatively new, but there are a few old temples or shrines.

Noteworthy places in Kōtō include:

- In the former ward of Fukagawa: Kiba, Fukagawa, Edagawa;
- In the former ward of Jōtō: Kameido, Ōjima, Sunamachi;
- On recently reclaimed land: Ariake, Yumenoshima, Tokyo Rinkai Fukutoshin.

== History ==
The western part of the ward was formerly part of Fukagawa Ward of Tokyo City. It suffered severe damage in the 1923 Great Kantō earthquake and was heavily bombed during World War II. Kōtō Ward was formed in 1947 by the merger of Fukagawa and Jōtō wards. The area has a history of canal-based commerce during the Edo period and was once a center for lumber storage and distribution.

== Demographics ==
Historical population
| Year | Pop. | ±% |
|---|---|---|
| 1908 | 119,098 | — |
| 1920 | 254,324 | +113.5% |
| 1930 | 319,786 | +25.7% |
| 1940 | 419,154 | +31.1% |
| 1945 | 25,208 | −94.0% |
| 1950 | 185,814 | +637.1% |
| 1960 | 351,053 | +88.9% |
| 1970 | 355,382 | +1.2% |
| 1980 | 362,270 | +1.9% |
| 1990 | 385,159 | +6.3% |
| 2000 | 376,840 | −2.2% |
| 2010 | 460,819 | +22.3% |
| 2020 | 524,310 | +13.8% |
Source: Censuses (Note: For years prior to 1950, figures cover the area of present-day Koto-ku.)

== Districts ==
Map of Kōtō and its districts (as of 2015)

There are 46 districts in Kōtō:

Fukagawa Area

- Botan
- Eitai
- Etchūjima
- Fukagawa
- Fukuzumi
- Furuishiba
- Fuyuki
- Hirano
- Ishijima
- Kiba

- Kiyosumi
- Miyoshi
- Mōri
- Morishita
- Monzen-nakachō
- Ōgibashi
- Saga
- Sarue
- Sengoku
- Shirakawa

- Shin-Ōhashi
- Sumiyoshi
- Senda
- Takabashi
- Tōyō
- Tokiwa
- Tomioka
- Umibe

Jōtō Area

- Higashisuna
- Kameido
- Kitasuna
- Minamisuna
- Ōjima

Waterfront Area

- Aomi
- Ariake
- Edagawa
- Shin-Kiba
- Shinonome
- Shinsuna
- Shiohama
- Shiomi
- Tatsumi

- Toyosu
- Uminomori
- Wakasu
- Yumenoshima

== Transportation ==
=== Rail ===
- JR East
  - Chūō-Sōbu Line: Kameido Station
  - Keiyō Line: Etchūjima Station, Shiomi Station, Shin-Kiba Station
- JR Freight
  - Etchūjima Branch Line: Etchūjima Freight Terminal
- Tokyo Metro
  - Tōzai Line: Monzen-nakacho Station, Kiba Station, Tōyōchō Station, Minami-Sunamachi Station
  - Yūrakuchō Line: Toyosu Station, Tatsumi Station, Shin-kiba Station
  - Hanzōmon Line: Sumiyoshi Station, Kiyosumi-shirakawa Station
- Tokyo Metropolitan Bureau of Transportation
  - Toei Shinjuku Line: Morishita Station, Sumiyoshi Station, Nishi-Ōjima Station, Ōjima Station, Higashi-Ōjima Station
  - Toei Ōedo Line: Morishita Station, Kiyosumi-shirakawa Station, Monzen-nakachō Station
- Tobu Railway
  - Kameido Line: Kameido Station, Kameido-suijin Station
- Tokyo Waterfront Area Rapid Transit
  - Rinkai Line: Shin-kiba Station, Shinonome Station, Kokusai-tenjijō Station, Tokyo Teleport Station
- Yurikamome
  - Yurikamome: Tokyo International Cruise Terminal Station, Telecom Center Station, Aomi Station, Tokyo Big Sight Station, Ariake Station, Ariake-Tennis-no-mori Station, Shijō-mae Station, Shin-toyosu Station, Toyosu Station

=== Highway ===
- Shuto Expressway
  - C2 Central Loop (Itabashi JCT – Kasai JCT)
  - No.7 Komatsugawa Route (Ryogoku JCT – Yagochi)
  - No.9 Fukagawa Route (Hakozaki JCT – Tatsumi JCT)
  - B Bayshore Route (Kawasaki-ukishima JCT – Koya)

=== Air ===
- Tokyo Heliport, in Shin-Kiba

== Economy ==
Companies with headquarters in Kōtō include Daimaru, Ibex Airlines, Fujikura, and Maruha Nichiro.

The broadcasting center of Wowow is in Kōtō.

Seta Corporation was headquartered in Kōtō.

== Government ==
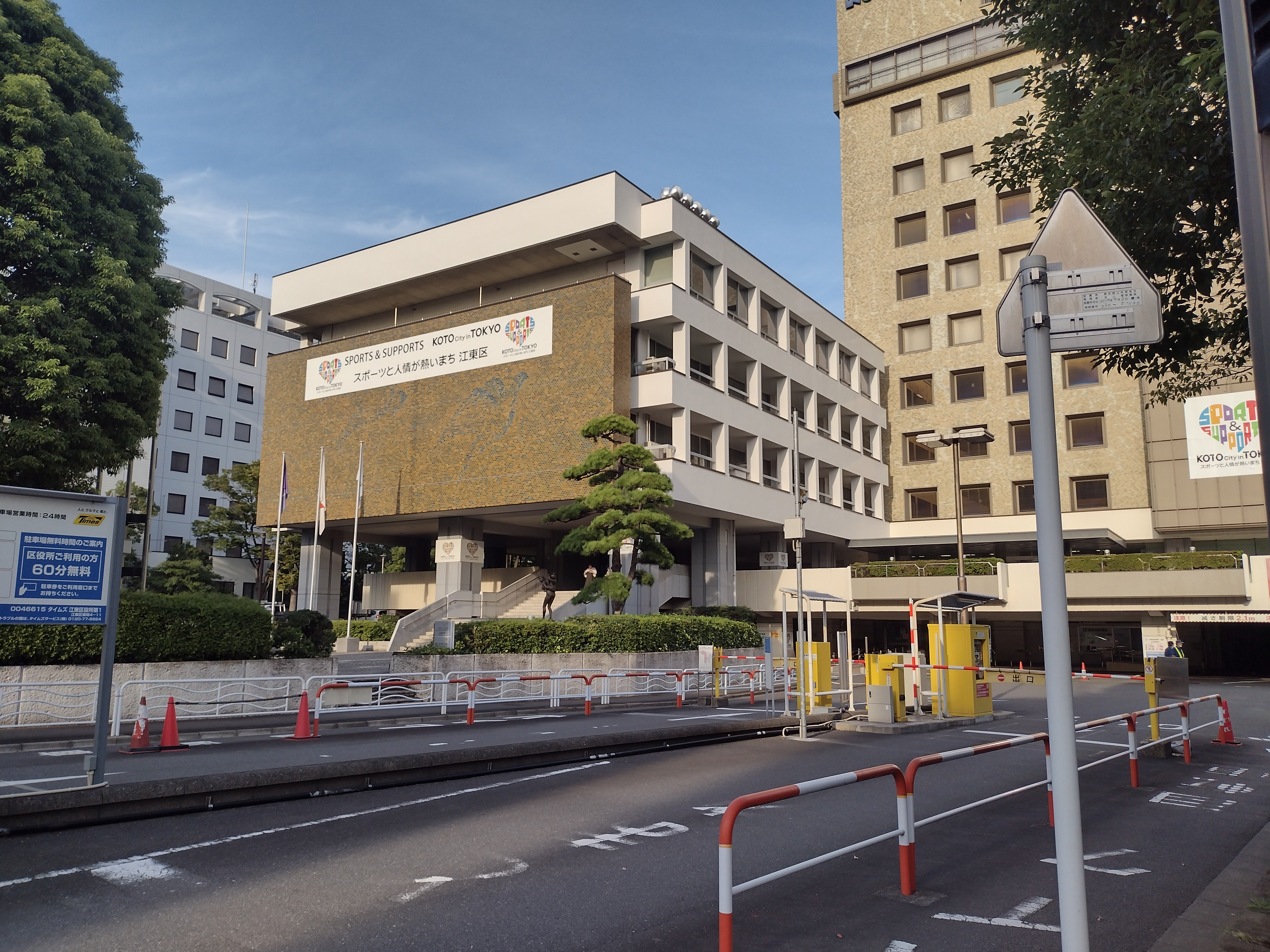
The main city office for Kōtō City

Kōtō City's main office is in Tōyō. There are branch offices in Shirakawa, Tomioka, Toyosu, Komatsubashi, Kameido, Ojima, Sunamachi, and Minamisuna.

== Notable places ==
- Toyosu Market, the world's largest wholesale fish market
- teamLab Planets
- Kameido Tenjin Shrine
- Tomioka Hachiman Shrine
- Fukagawa Edo Museum
- Fukagawa Fudo-son
- Kiyosumi Garden
- Museum of Contemporary Art Tokyo in Kiba Park
- Tokyo Big Sight (Tokyo International Exhibition Center)
- Ariake Coliseum, site of Japan Open Tennis Championships, All Japan Tennis Championships
- Ariake Tennis Forest Park, which has Ariake Coliseum and 48 tennis courts
- Suzaki Baseball Field, site of Japanese Baseball League games in 1930s
- Kiba Metropolitan Park
- Yumenoshima Tropical Greenhouse Dome
- Shin-Kiba 1st Ring
- Tokyo Gate Bridge
- Dream Bridge

=== Kiba Park ===
Kiba Park is a spacious urban park in Kōtō, covering approximately 238,711 square metres (2,569,460 sq ft). The park features jogging paths, tennis courts, a barbecue area, playgrounds, and open lawns. It is divided into northern and southern sections connected by the Kiba Park Bridge, a prominent pedestrian overpass. The park also includes the Kiba Park Urban Greening Botanical Garden and hosts seasonal events such as the "Flower and Light Movement" illumination.

=== Museum of Contemporary Art Tokyo ===
The Museum of Contemporary Art Tokyo (MOT), within Kiba Park, opened in 1995. It focuses on contemporary art from the postwar period to the present, with works by both Japanese and international artists, and houses about 5,400 artworks and 280,000 related materials. It underwent a major renovation and reopened in 2019.

== Education ==
=== Colleges and universities ===
- Ariake Junior College of Education and the Arts (Ariake Kyōiku Geijutsu Tanki Daigaku)
- Musashino University (Musashino Daigaku, a private university)
- Tokyo University of Marine Science and Technology (Tokyo Kaiyo Daigaku, part of the national university system)
- Shibaura Institute of Technology (Shibaura Kougyō Daigaku)
- Shurin College of Foreign Language (Shurin Gaigo Senmon Gakkou, a private 2 year college for language)

=== Primary and secondary schools ===
Public high schools are operated by the Tokyo Metropolitan Government Board of Education.

- Third Commercial High School
- Fukagawa High School
- Higashi High School
- High School of Science and Technology
- Johtoh High School
- Koto Commercial High School
- Oedo High School
- Sumida Technical High School

Public elementary and middle schools are operated by the Koto City Board of Education.

Combined junior and senior high schools:

- Ariake Nishi Gakuen (有明西学園)

Junior high schools:

- No. 2 Kameido Junior High School (第二亀戸中学校)
- No. 2 Minamisuna Junior High School (第二南砂中学校)
- No. 2 Ojima Junior High School (第二大島中学校)
- No. 2 Sunamachi Junior High School (第二砂町中学校)
- No. 3 Kameido Junior High School (第三亀戸中学校)
- No. 3 Sunamachi Junior High School (第三砂町中学校)
- No. 4 Sunamachi Junior High School (第四砂町中学校)
- Ariake Junior High School (有明中学校)
- Fukagawa No. 1 Junior High School (深川第一中学校)
- Fukagawa No. 2 Junior High School (深川第二中学校)
- Fukagawa No. 3 Junior High School (深川第三中学校)
- Fukagawa No. 4 Junior High School (深川第四中学校)
- Fukagawa No. 5 Junior High School (深川第五中学校)
- Fukagawa No. 6 Junior High School (深川第六中学校)
- Fukagawa No. 7 Junior High School (深川第七中学校)
- Fukagawa No. 8 Junior High School (深川第八中学校)
- Kameido Junior High School (亀戸中学校)
- Ojima Junior High School (大島中学校)
- Ojima Nishi Junior High School (大島西中学校)
- Minamisuna Junior High School (南砂中学校)
- Sunamachi Junior High School (砂町中学校)
- Tatsumi Junior High School (辰巳中学校)
- Toyo Junior High School (東陽中学校)

Elementary schools:

- No. 1 Kameido Elementary School (第一亀戸小学校)
- No. 1 Ojima Elementary School (第一大島小学校)
- No. 2 Kameido Elementary School (第二亀戸小学校)
- No. 2 Ojima Elementary School (第二大島小学校)
- No. 2 Sunamachi Elementary School (第二砂町小学校)
- No. 2 Tatsumi Elementary School (第二辰巳小学校)
- No. 3 Ojima Elementary School (第三大島小学校)
- No. 3 Sunamachi Elementary School (第三砂町小学校)
- No. 4 Ojima Elementary School (第四大島小学校)
- No. 4 Sunamachi Elementary School (第四砂町小学校)
- No. 5 Ojima Elementary School (第五大島小学校)
- No. 5 Sunamachi Elementary School (第五砂町小学校)
- No. 6 Sunamachi Elementary School (第六砂町小学校)
- No. 7 Sunamachi Elementary School (第七砂町小学校)
- Ariake Elementary School (有明小学校)
- Edagawa Elementary School (枝川小学校)
- Etchujima Elementary School (越中島小学校)
- Fukagawa Elementary School (深川小学校)
- Heikyu Elementary School (平久小学校)
- Higashisuna Elementary School (東砂小学校)
- Kametaka Elementary School (亀高小学校)
- Katori Elementary School (香取小学校)
- Kazuya Elementary School (数矢小学校)
- Kitasuna Elementary School (北砂小学校)
- Meiji Elementary School (明治小学校)
- Minamisuna Elementary School (南砂小学校)
- Mori Elementary School (毛利小学校)
- Motogaka Elementary School (元加賀小学校)
- Nanyo Elementary School (南陽小学校)
- Ogibashi Elementary School (扇橋小学校)
- Ojima Nan'o Elementary School (大島南央小学校)
- Onagigawa Elementary School (小名木川小学校)
- Rinkai Elementary School (臨海小学校)
- Sengen Tatekawa Elementary School (浅間竪川小学校)
- Sennan Elementary School (川南小学校)
- Shinonome Elementary School (東雲小学校)
- Suijin Elementary School (水神小学校)
- Sunamachi Elementary School (砂町小学校)
- Tatsumi Elementary School (辰巳小学校)
- Tosen Elementary School (東川小学校)
- Toyo Elementary School (東陽小学校)
- Toyosu Elementary School (豊洲小学校)
- Toyosu Kita Elementary School (豊洲北小学校)
- Toyosu Nishi Elementary School (豊洲西小学校)
- Yanagawa Elementary School (八名川小学校)

Private schools:

- Chuogakuin University Chuo High School
- Kaetsu Ariake Junior and Senior High School
- Nakamura Junior & Senior Girls' High School
- Shibaura Institute of Technology Junior and Senior High School

=== International schools ===
International schools are independently owned and operated.

- K. International School Tokyo
- India International School in Japan
- Tokyo Bay International School
- Tokyo Second Korean Elementary School (東京朝鮮第二初級学校) – North Korean school

== International relations ==
On April 20, 1989, Kōtō became a sister city of Surrey, British Columbia, Canada.

== Notable people from Kōtō ==
- Yuto Horigome, Japanese skateboarder, 2020 Olympic gold medalist
- Shōta Sometani, Japanese actor
- Takaaki Yamazaki, Japanese politician and the former mayor of Kōtō
- Kazuto Sakata, Japanese former professional motorcycle racer and two-time F.I.M. 125cc world champion
- Anne Nakamura, Japanese model, tarento and actress
- Daisuke Matsuzaka, Japanese professional baseball pitcher, 2007 World Series champion
- Daisuke Gōri, Japanese actor, voice actor and narrator
- Genki Sudo, Japanese politician, former entertainer and kickboxer
- Ben Kimura, Japanese politician
- Hana Kimura, Japanese professional wrestler, died in Kōtō
- Hiroshi Yamamoto, Japanese professional shogi player ranked 4-dan
- Tomomi Kahara, Japanese pop singer
- Akihito Hirose, Japanese professional shogi player ranked 8-dan
- Hiromu Watanabe, Japanese professional shogi player ranked 5-dan
- Yasuko Kobayashi, Japanese anime and tokusatsu drama screenwriter
- Yōhei Kajiyama, Japanese former football player
- Tetsuo Kurata, Japanese television, stage, film actor and restauranteur (Kamen Rider Black and Kamen Rider Black RX)
- Tomokazu Seki, Japanese actor, voice actor and singer featured in Fushigi Yūgi, Weiss Kruez, You're Under Arrest, Initial D, Mobile Suite Gundam Seed, Mobile Suite Gundam Seed DESTINY
- Ruki Shiroiwa, member of Japanese boy band JO1
