= Takaaki Yamazaki =

Japanese politician (1943–2023)

- 山崎 孝明

Mayor of Kōtō
- In office 27 April 2007 – 12 April 2023
- Preceded by: Akira Murohashi
- Succeeded by: Yayoi Kimura

Member of the Tokyo Metropolitan Assembly
- In office 1990–2007
- Constituency: Kōtō Ward

Member of the Kōtō City Assembly
- In office 1 May 1983 – 1990

Personal details
- Born: 13 October 1943 Kōtō, Tokyo, Japan
- Died: 12 April 2023 (aged 79) Tokyo, Japan
- Party: Independent
- Education: Waseda University

Takaaki Yamazaki (山崎 孝明, Yamazaki Takaaki; 13 October 1943 – 12 April 2023) was a Japanese politician who was the mayor of Kōtō, Tokyo. He was also an advisor to the head of the Tokyo Olympic Organizing Committee.

== Early life and career ==
Yamazaki was born on 13 October 1943, in Kōtō city, and attended Waseda University, graduating from the faculty of commerce in 1967. In 1983 he was elected as a member of the Kōtō City Assembly and served two terms. In 1991 he was elected as a member of the Tokyo Metropolitan Assembly and served five terms. He became mayor of Kōtō in 2007. He was supported by the Liberal Democratic Party and Komeito.

== Mayoral activities ==
In 2011 Yamazaki accepted a proposal to bury 3,000 tons of radiation-tainted sludge in a breakwater project in Tokyo bay.

In 2013 he suggested introducing joint "Tokyo Wangan" (Tokyo Bay area) car license plates with six Tokyo Wards.

After Tokyo was selected for the 2020 Olympics, Yamazaki stated that he wanted to make Kōtō the "Olympic city" and move forward with plans for the 5.2 Hachigo line subway from Toyosu to Toyo.

In 2014 he considered the construction of a cable car from Shiodome to Toyosu.
