= Shinonome, Tokyo =

District in Kōtō, Tokyo, Japan

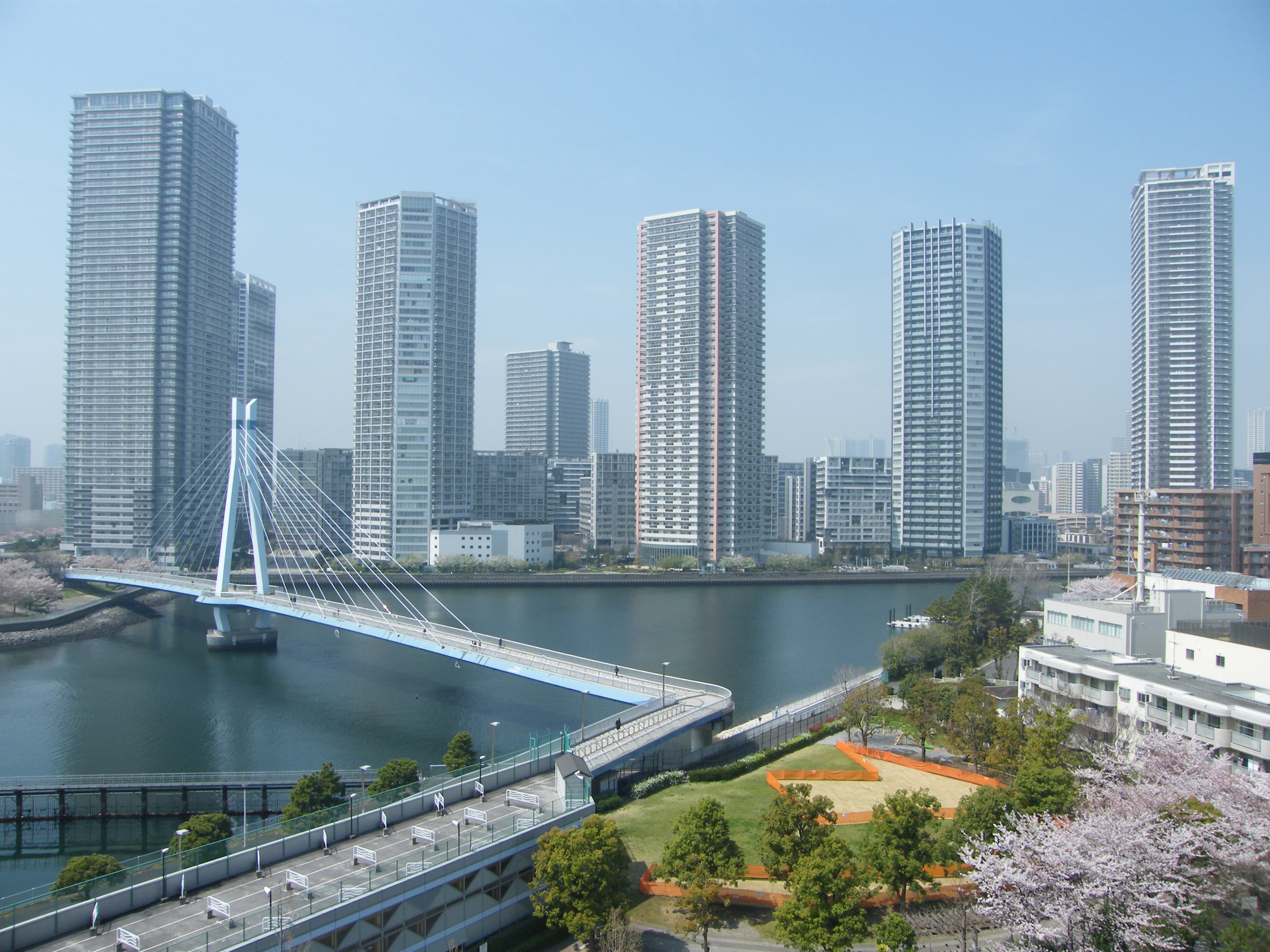
Shinonome seen from Tatsumi

Shinonome (東雲) is a district of Kōtō, Tokyo, Japan. Ariake is to the west of it, and it is joined to Toyosu to the north by a bridge, and Tatsumi to the east by several bridges. Its subdivisions consist of 14 numbered chome. Located south of Toyosu, it is largely a residential area, with many apartments and condominiums.

== Transportation ==
- Shinonome Station (Rinkai Line)

== Companies ==
- Tokyo Electric Power Services Co. Ltd

== Public facilities ==
- Shinonome Grancha
- Shinonome Mizube Park
- Shinonome Public Library

== Residences ==
- Apple Tower
- Beacon Tower
- Branz Shinonome
- Canal Court Codan
- Comfort Towers
- Canal First Tower
- Park Tower
- Proud Tower
- Shinonome Number Two Apartment Building
- Tomin Tower

== Education ==
Koto Ward Board of Education operates public elementary and junior high schools.

Shinonome Elementary School (東雲小学校) is the zoned public elementary school for parts of Shinonome. Daini (No. 2) Tatsumi Primary School (第二辰巳小学校) is the zoned public elementary school for a few other parts of Shinonome. Ariake Elementary School (有明小学校) is the zoned public elementary school for one block of Shinonome.

Most of Shinonome is zoned to Ariake Junior High School (有明中学校) while some residences are zoned to Tatsumi Junior High School (辰巳中学校).
