= Tokyo Heliport =

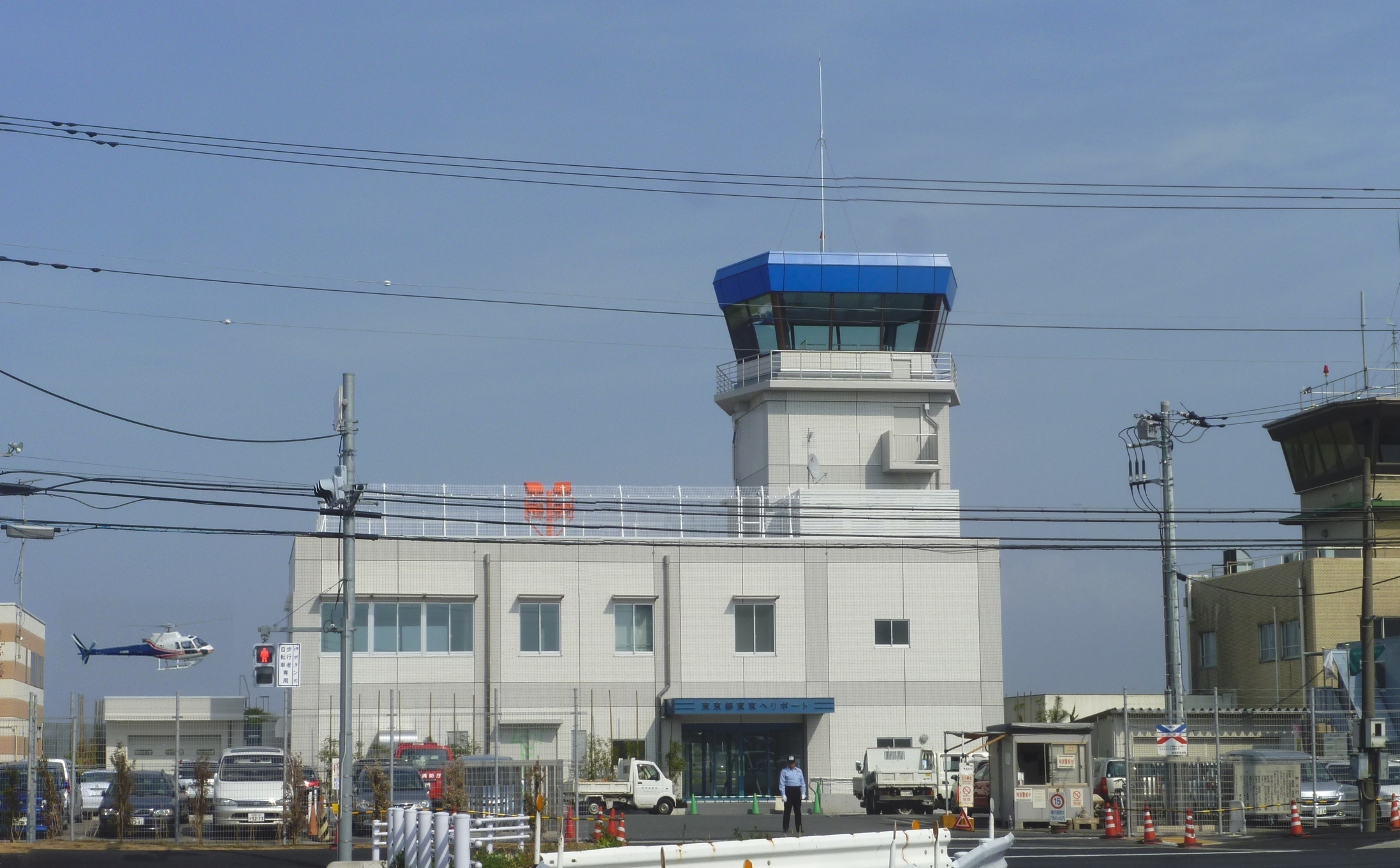
- Tokyo Heliport
- IATA: none; ICAO: RJTI

Summary
- Airport type: Public
- Operator: Tokyo Metropolitan Government
- Location: Kōtō, Tokyo
- Elevation AMSL: 16 ft / 5 m
- Coordinates: 35°38′10″N 139°50′22″E
- Website: 東京都東京ヘリポート

Map
- Location in Japan

Helipads
Number	Length		Surface
Number	m	ft	Surface
H1 (01/19)	90× 30	295 × 98	Asphalt concrete
- Source: Japanese AIP at AIS Japan

Tokyo Heliport (東京へリポート, Tōkyō Heripōto) is a heliport in Kōtō, Tokyo, Japan, mainly used for flights in the Greater Tokyo Area. It is used by both government organizations and private companies.

== History ==
The Tokyo Metropolitan Government opened a Tokyo Heliport in the nearby Tatsumi area in 1964. That heliport was replaced by the current Tokyo Heliport in June 1972. The heliport was expanded significantly in 1990, and a new management building opened in 2011.

== Users ==
There are no scheduled services to Tokyo Heliport. Approximately 15 companies operate at this heliport including Airbus Helicopters, Aero Asahi, DHC Helicopter Division, Ibex Aviation, Akagi Helicopter, Minebea, Noevir Aviation, Shin Nihon Helicopters, All Nippon Helicopter and Toho Air Service.

It is also an important base for helicopters operated by news organizations such as TV Asahi, TBS and the Tokyo Shimbun.

Government users include the Tokyo Metropolitan Police Department, Tokyo Fire Department and Kawasaki Fire Department

== Facilities ==
The heliport has 38 parking berths including ten for large helicopters.

== Viewing points ==
Like other airports in Japan, there are several viewing areas constructed near the heliport.

== Access ==
Public transport service to the airport is through Shin-Kiba Station with buses running regularly from there to the heliport.
