= Shin-Kiba Station =

Railway and metro station in Tokyo, Japan

JE05 R01 Shin-Kiba Station 新木場駅

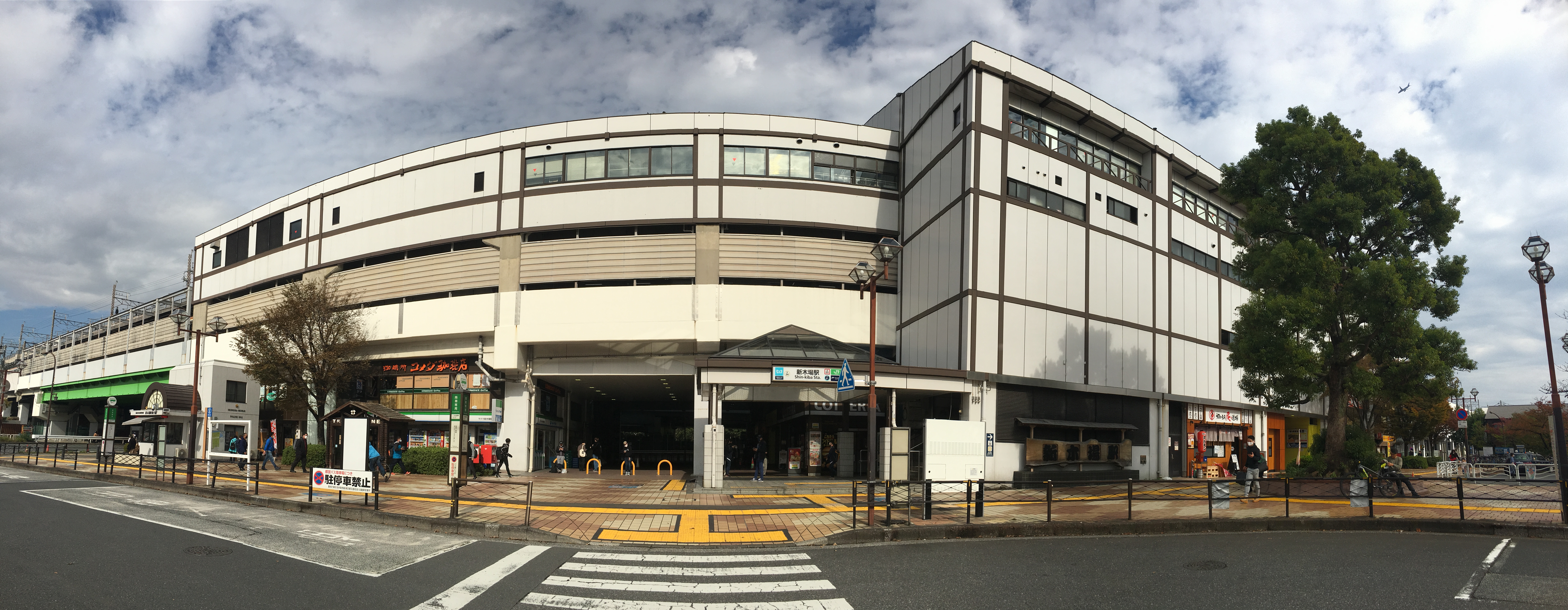
- In front of the station, 2020

General information
- Location: Kōtō-ku, Tokyo; Japan
- Coordinates: 35°38′45″N 139°49′37″E
- Operator: East Japan Railway Company; Tokyo Metro; Tokyo Waterfront Area Rapid Transit
- Lines: Keiyō Line; Rinkai Line
- Distance: 7.4 km (4.6 mi) from Tokyo; 28.3 km (17.6 mi) from Wakoshi; 12.2 km (7.6 mi) from Ōsaki

Other information
- Station code: Y-24, R01, JE05

History
- Opened: 8 June 1988; 38 years ago

Passengers
- FY2024: 70,078 daily (JR East)
- FY2024: 95,764 daily (Tokyo Metro)
- FY2024: 30,483 daily (TWR)
- Rank: 4 of 8 (TWR)

Services
Preceding station	JR East	Following station
Hatchōbori JE02 towards Tokyo	Keiyō Line Rapid	Maihama JE07 towards Soga
Shiomi JE04 towards Tokyo	Keiyō Line Local	Kasai-Rinkai Park JE06 towards Soga
Shiomi JE04 towards Tokyo	Musashino Line Keiyō Line through-service	Kasai-Rinkai Park JE06 towards Fuchūhommachi
Preceding station	Tokyo Metro	Following station
Tatsumi towards Wakoshi	Yūrakuchō Line	Terminus
Preceding station	Tokyo Waterfront Area Rapid Transit	Following station
Shinonome R02 towards Ōsaki	Rinkai Line	Terminus
Location
- Location within Tokyo Keiyo area Location within Tokyo wards area Location within Japan

Shin-Kiba Station (Japanese: 新木場駅, Hepburn: Shin-kiba-eki) is a railway station in Kōtō, Tokyo, Japan, operated jointly by Tokyo Metro, East Japan Railway Company (JR East), and Tokyo Waterfront Area Rapid Transit (TWR).

== Station layout ==
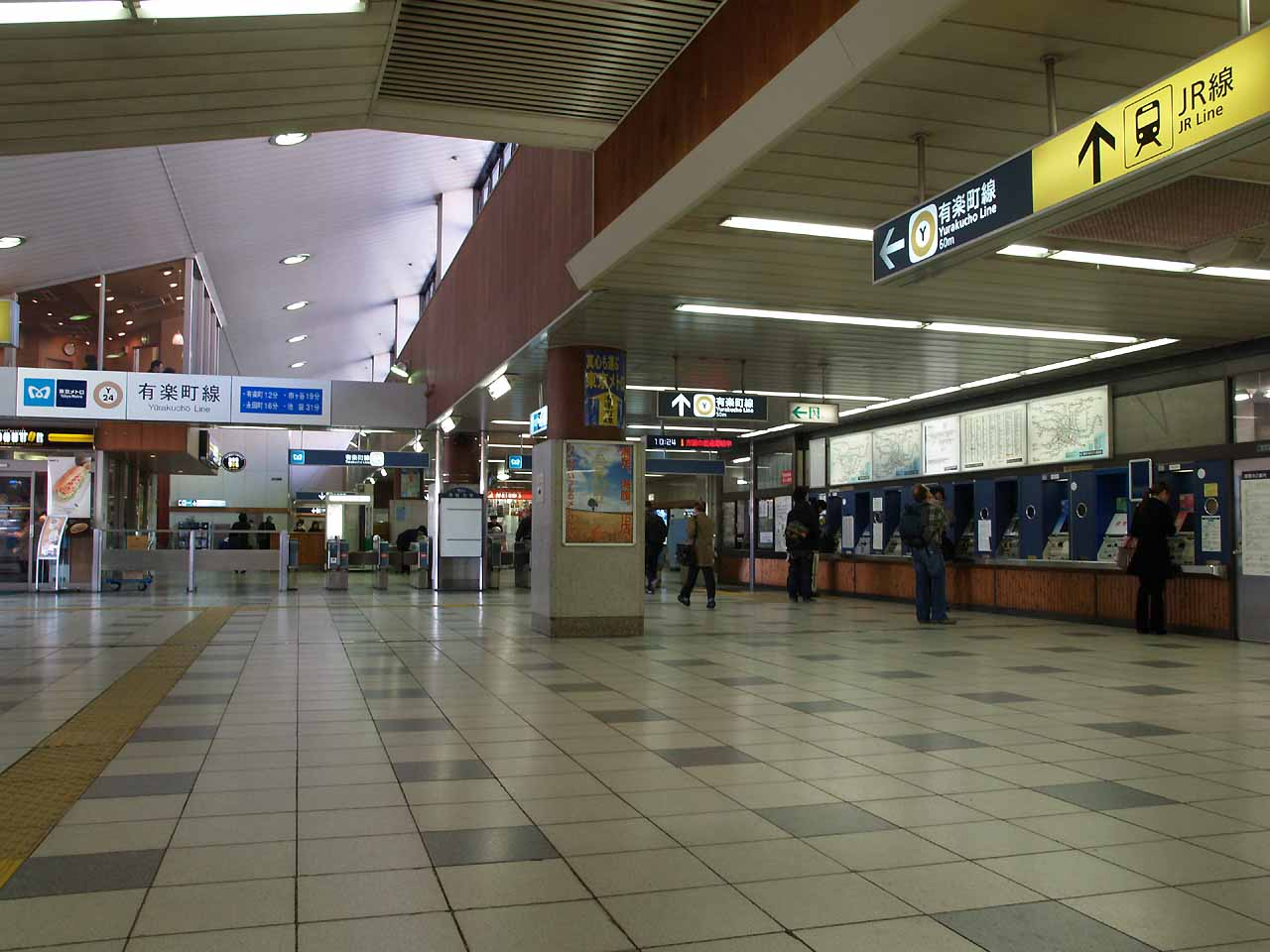
The station concourse in February 2008

Each of the three lines has its own station facilities.

=== JR East platforms ===
The JR East station consists of a single island platform serving two tracks.

1	Keiyō Line	for Maihama, Kaihimmakuhari, Soga, Kazusa-Ichinomiya, and Kimitsu
1	Musashino Line through service	for Nishi-Funabashi and Shim-Matsudo
2	Keiyō Line	for Tokyo

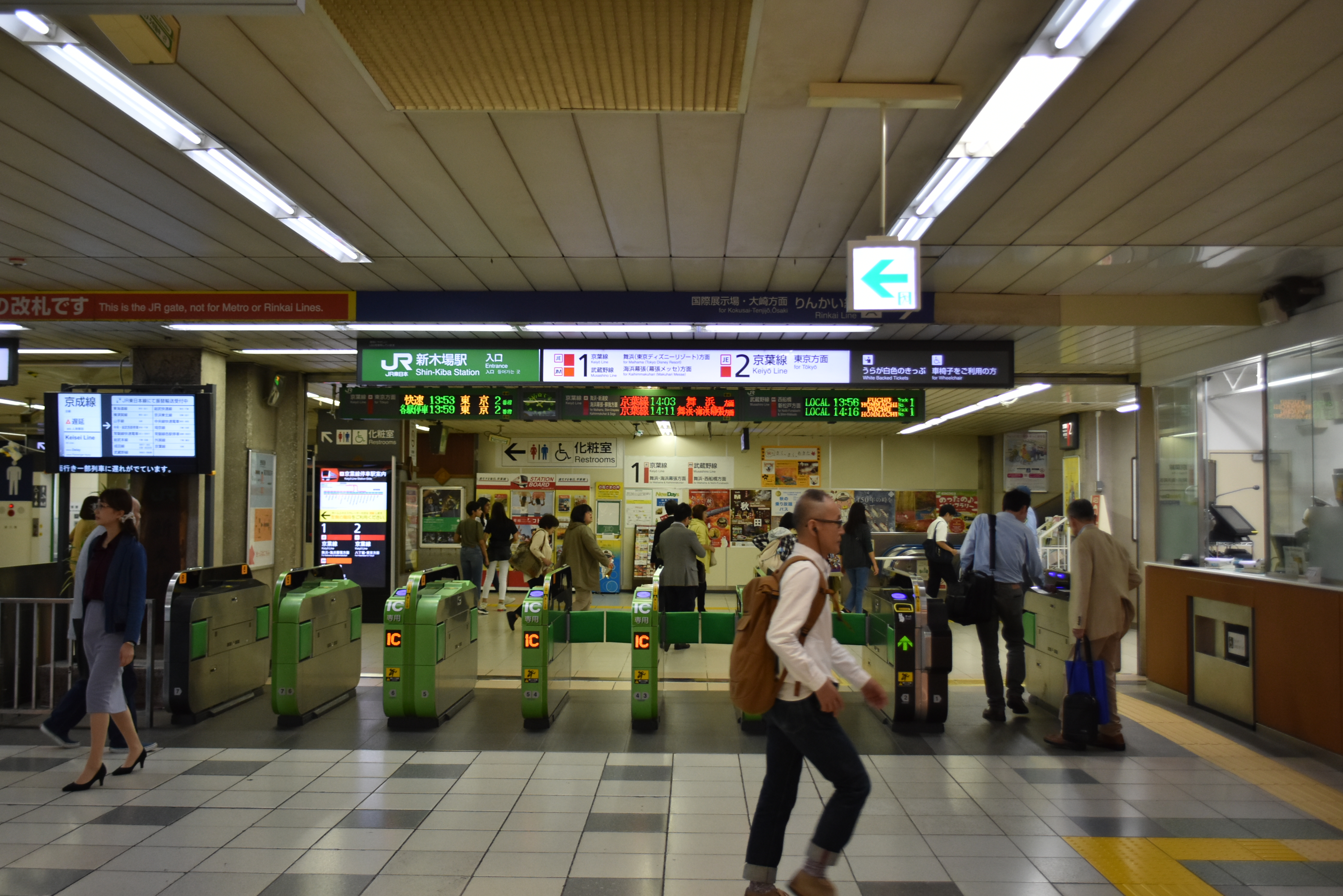
JR East ticket gates

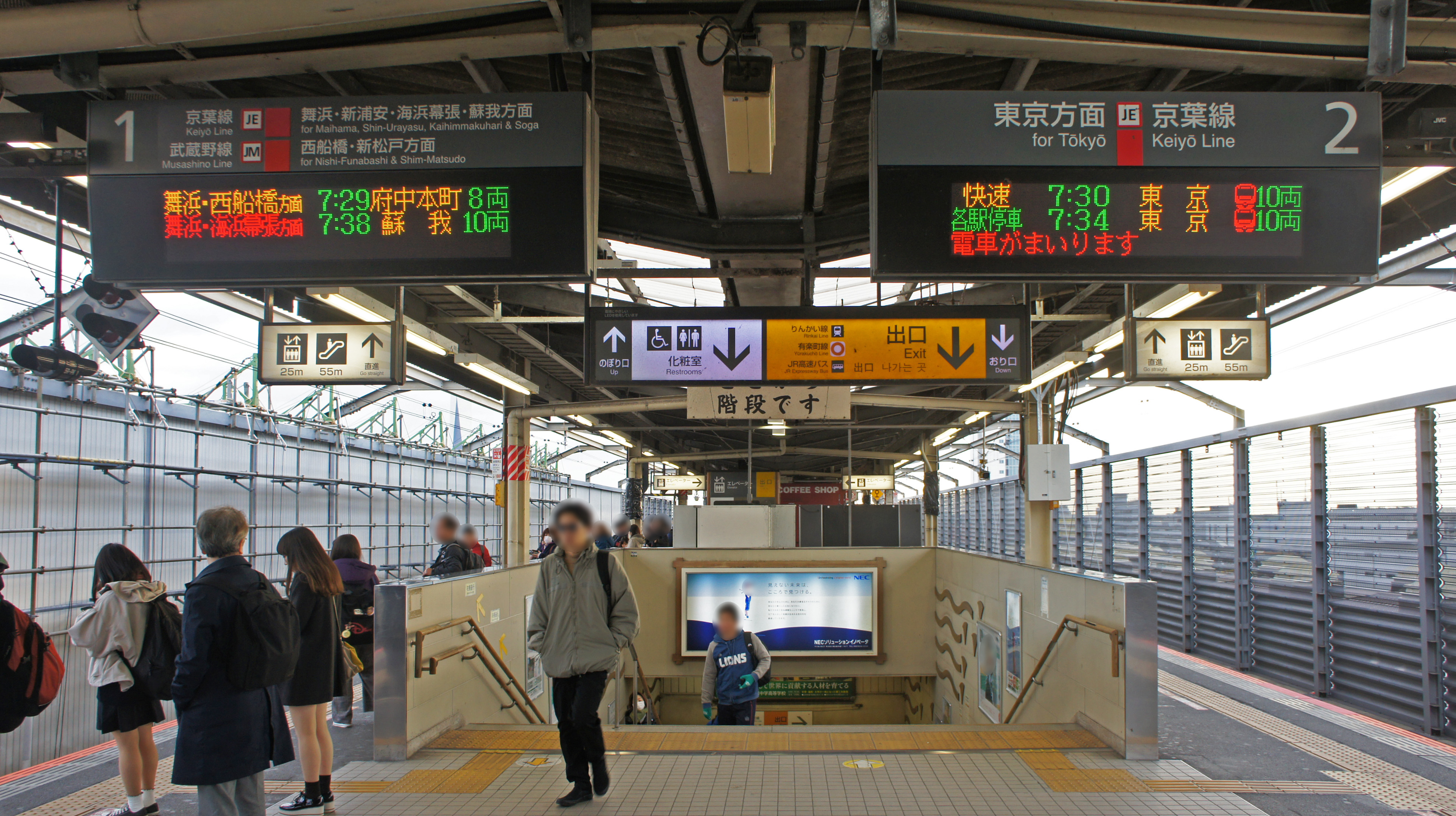
JR East platform

=== Tokyo Metro platforms ===
1	Yūrakuchō Line	Arrival only
2	Yūrakuchō Line	for Yūrakuchō, Iidabashi, Ikebukuro, Kotake-Mukaihara and Wakōshi; Tobu Tojo Line for Shinrinkōen; Seibu Ikebukuro Line for Hannō

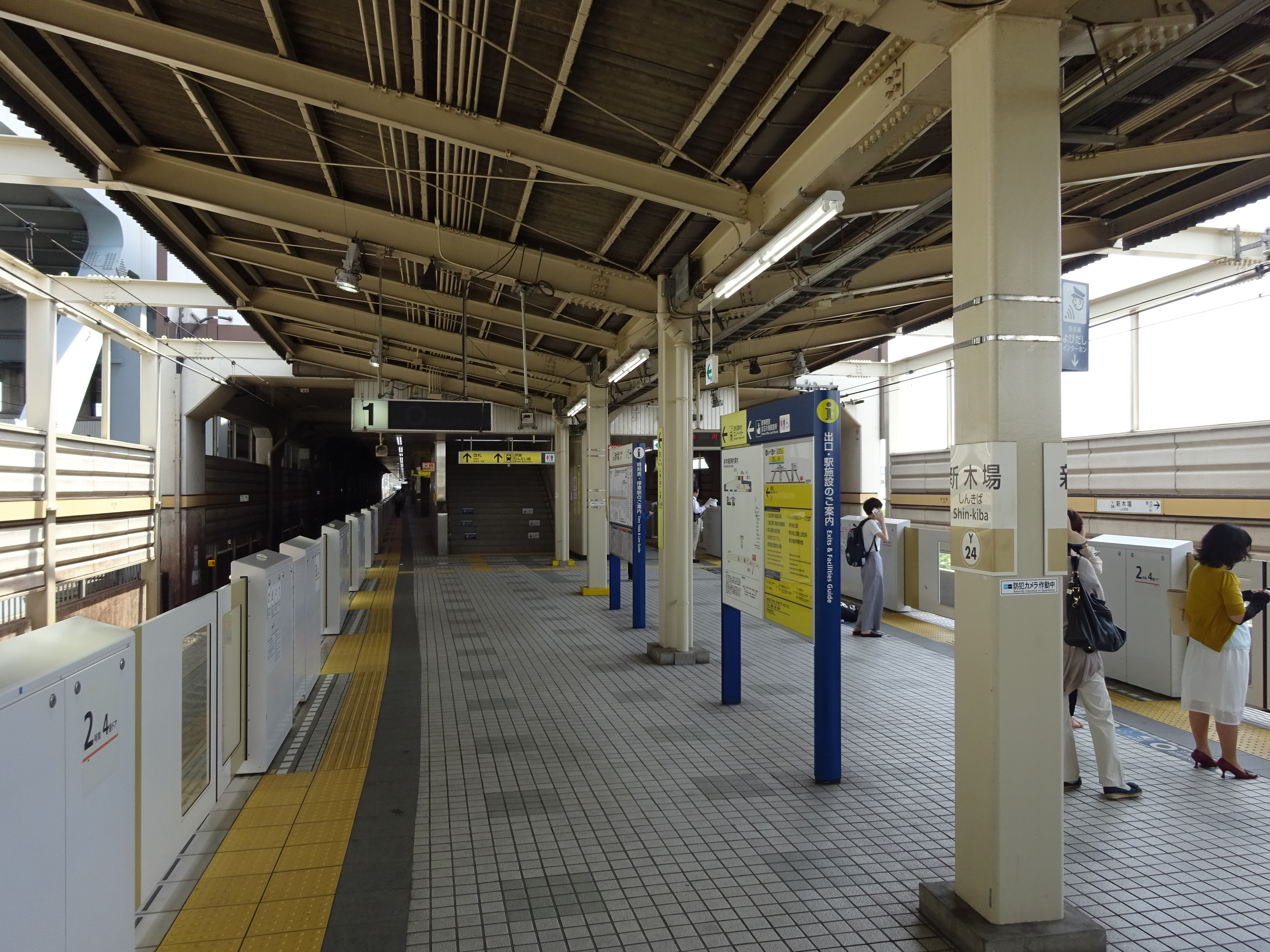
Tokyo Metro platforms

=== TWR platforms ===
1, 2	Rinkai Line	for Tokyo Teleport, Ōimachi and Ōsaki

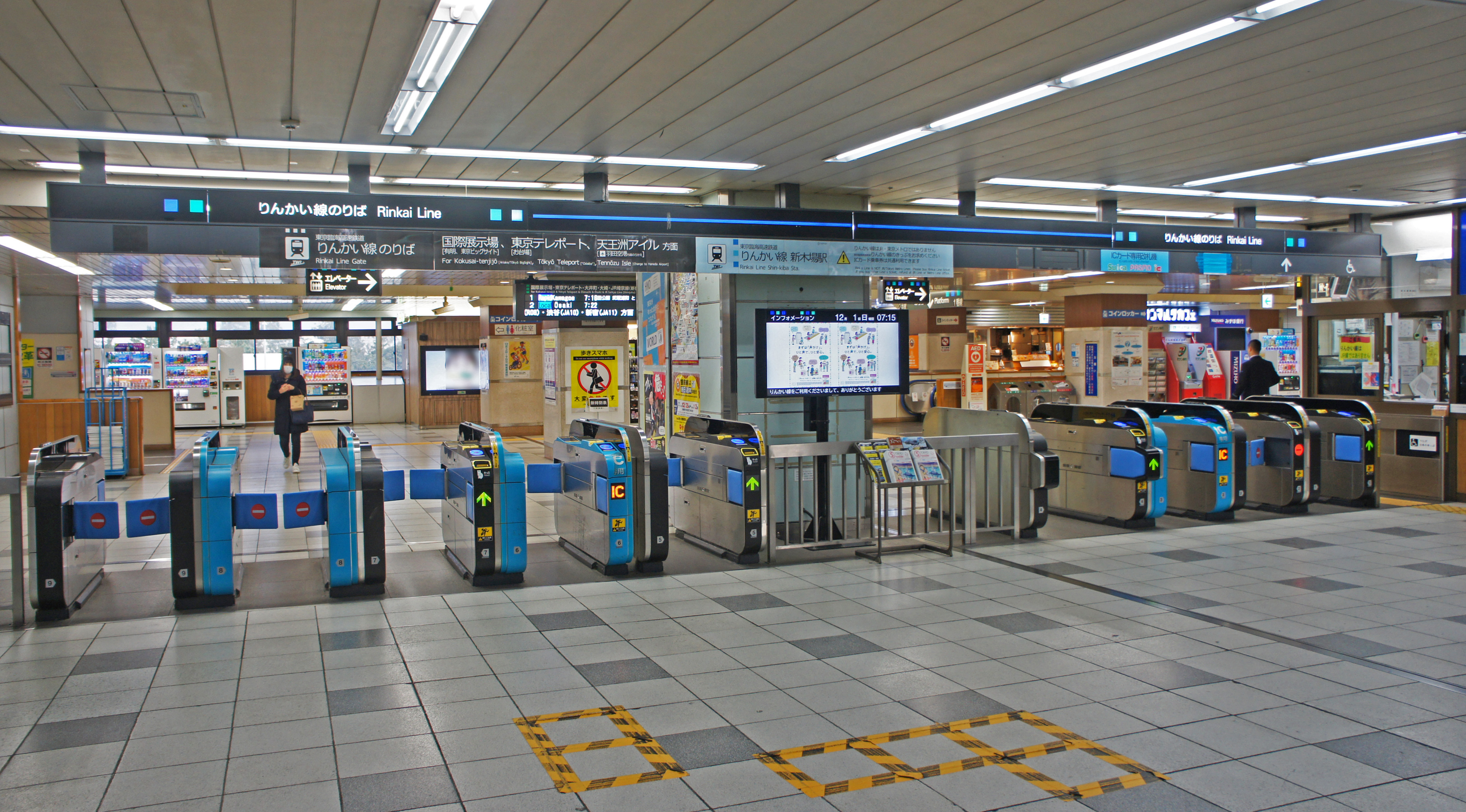
Ticket gates

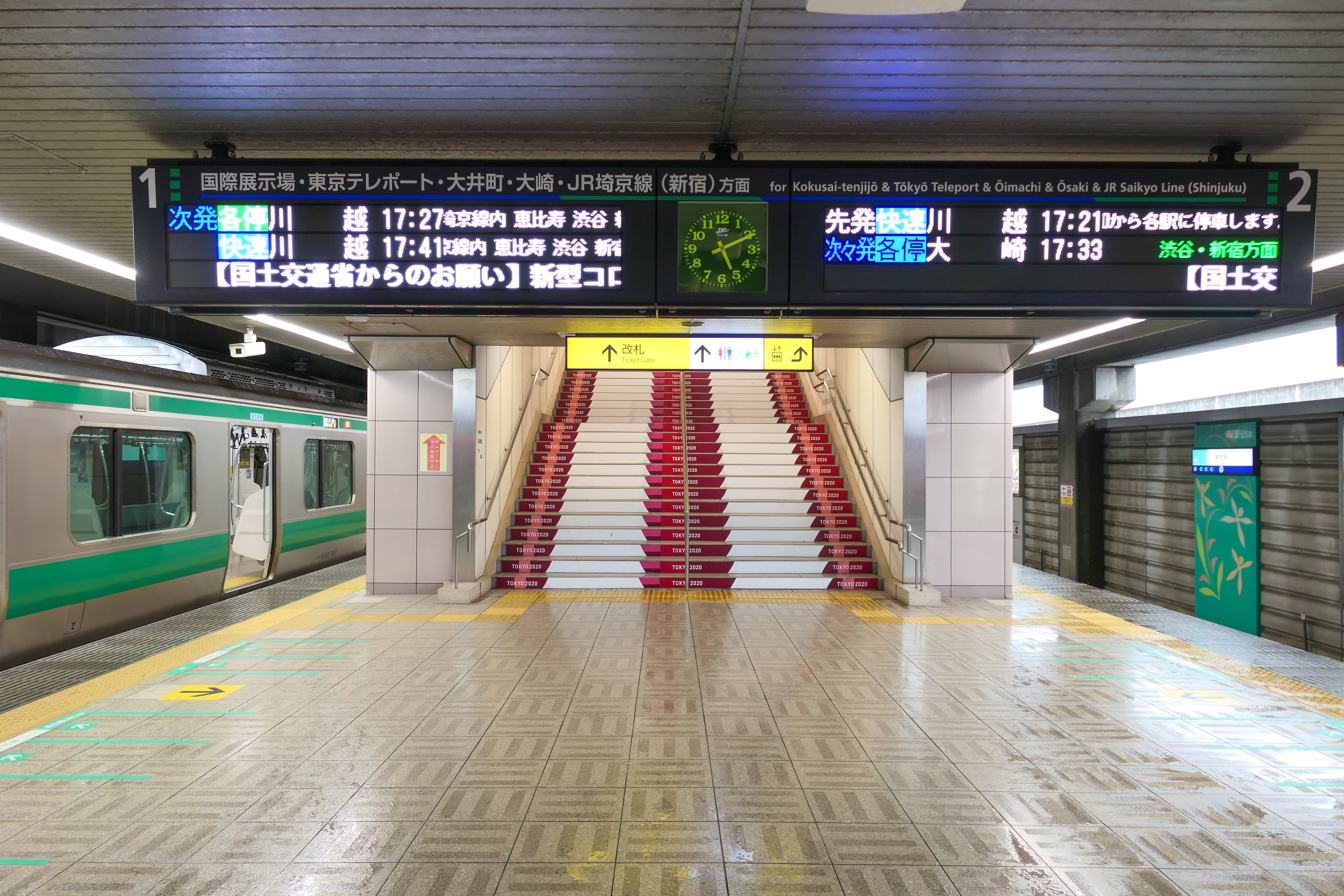
Platform

== History ==
The Teito Rapid Transit Authority (TRTA) station opened on 8 June 1988, as the southern terminus of the Yūrakuchō Line.

On 1 December 1988, JR East opened its Shin-Kiba Station platforms as the western terminus of the Keiyō Line. The Keiyō Line was extended from Shin-Kiba Station to Tokyo Station from 10 March 1990.

The TWR station opened on 30 March 1996, as the eastern terminus of the Rinkai Line. From 1 December 2002, JR Saikyō Line trains were extended to operate over the Rinkai Line to Shin-Kiba Station.

Station numbering was introduced to the Rinkai Line platforms in 2016 with Shin-Kiba being assigned station number R01. Later in 2016 the JR East platforms were assigned station number JE05 for the Keiyo Line.

== Passenger statistics ==
In fiscal 2013, the JR East station was used by an average of 70,831 passengers daily (boarding passengers only), making it the 61st-busiest station operated by JR East. In fiscal 2013, the Tokyo Metro station was used by an average of 101,043 passengers per day (exiting and entering passengers), making it the 34th-busiest station operated by Tokyo Metro. In fiscal 2013, the TWR station was used by an average of 30,312 people daily (boarding passengers only). The average daily passenger figures for each operator in previous years are as shown below.

Fiscal year	JR East	Tokyo Metro	TWR
2000	41,550		
2005	55,653		
2010	65,780		
2011	64,487	93,783	25,887
2012	67,590	96,852	29,026
2013	70,831	101,043	30,312

- Note that JR East and TWR figures are for boarding passengers only.

== Surrounding area ==
- Tokyo Gate Bridge (within walking distance)
- Yumenoshima Park
- Yumenoshima Tropical Greenhouse Dome
- AgeHa nightclub and event space
- Tokyo Metro Shinkiba Depot
- Tokyo Heliport

== See also ==
- List of railway stations in Japan
