= Tatsumi Station =

Metro station in Tokyo, Japan

Coordinates: 35°38′44.04″N 139°48′37.89″E

Tatsumi Station 辰巳駅

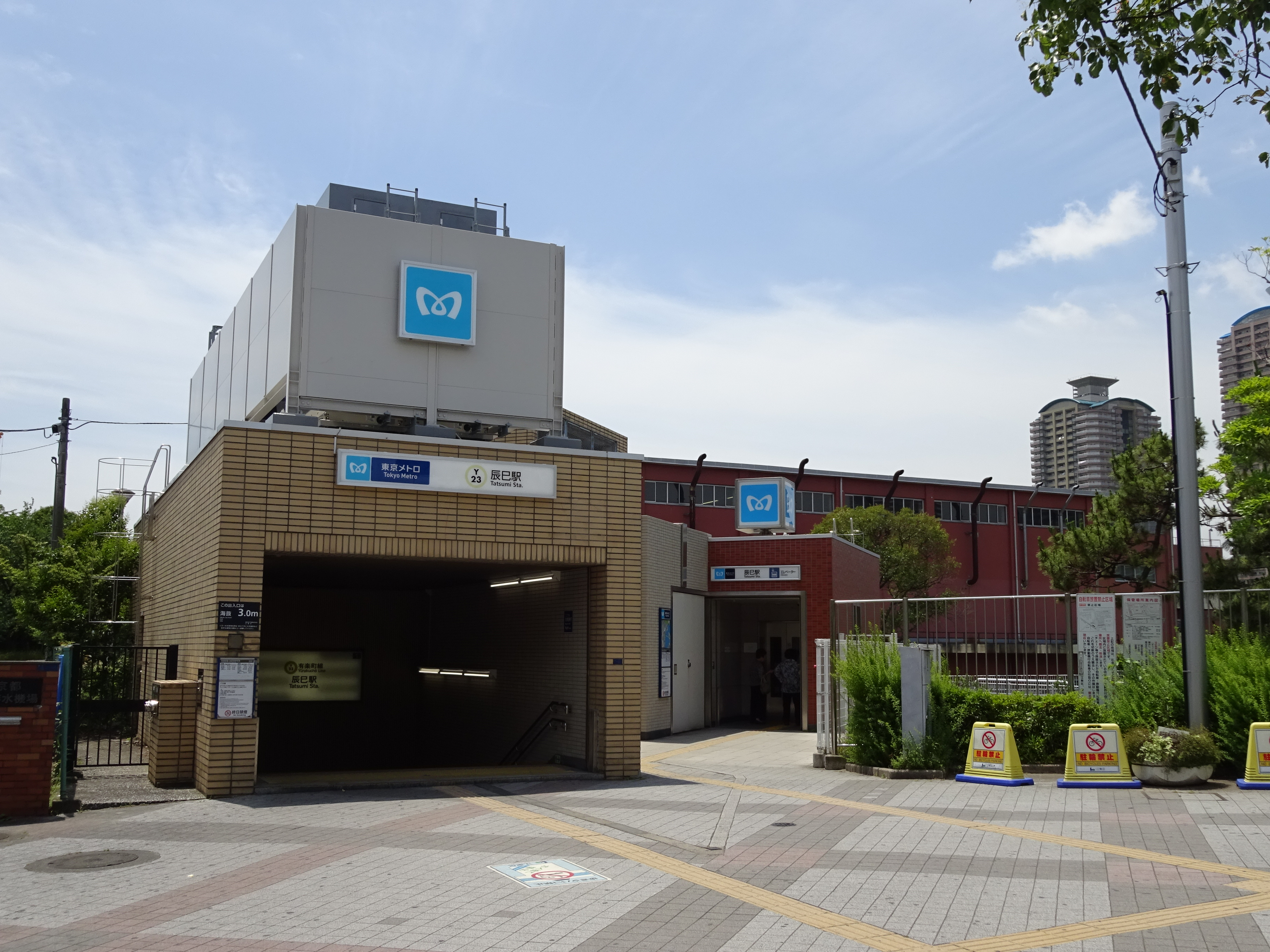
- Exit1 in June 2016

General information
- Location: 1-44 Tatsumi, Kōtō, Tokyo; Japan
- Operator: Tokyo Metro
- Line: Yūrakuchō Line
- Platforms: 1 island platform
- Tracks: 2

Construction
- Structure type: Underground

Other information
- Station code: Y-23

History
- Opened: 8 June 1988; 38 years ago

Services
Preceding station	Tokyo Metro	Following station
Toyosu towards Wakoshi	Yūrakuchō Line	Shin-kiba Terminus
Location
- Location within Special wards of Tokyo Location within Tokyo Bay and Bōsō Peninsula Location within Tokyo Location within Japan

Tatsumi Station (辰巳駅, Tatsumi-eki) is a railway station in Tatsumi, Kōtō, Tokyo, Japan. Its station number is Y-23. The station opened on 8 June 1988, and consists of an island platform serving two tracks.

== Line ==
- Tokyo Metro Yūrakuchō Line

== Platform layout ==
The station consists of an underground island platform serving two tracks

1	Yūrakuchō Line	for Shinkiba
2	Yūrakuchō Line	for Nagatachō, Ikebukuro and Wakōshi; Tobu Tojo Line for Shinrinkōen; Seibu Ikebukuro Line for Hannō

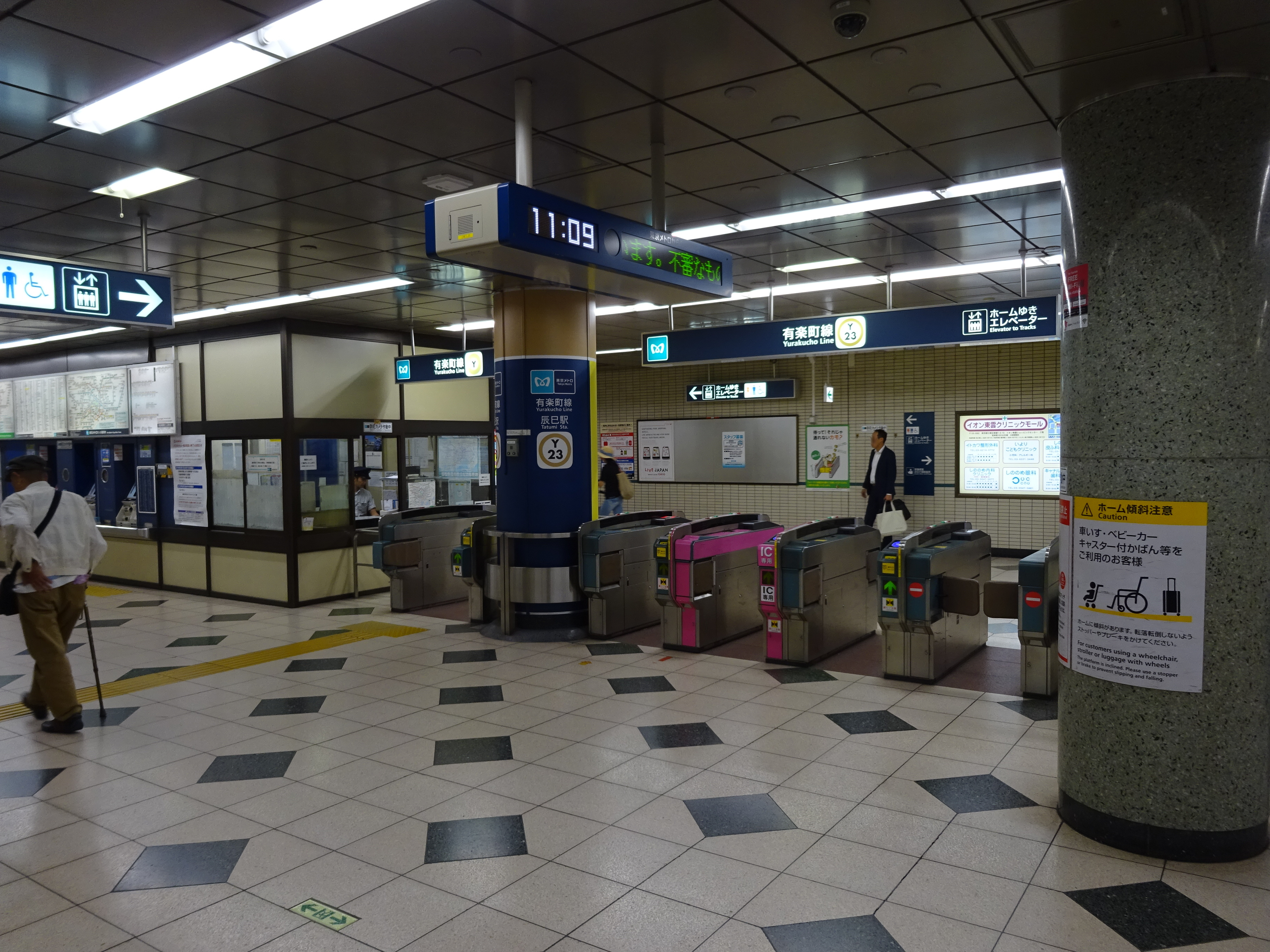
Ticket gate

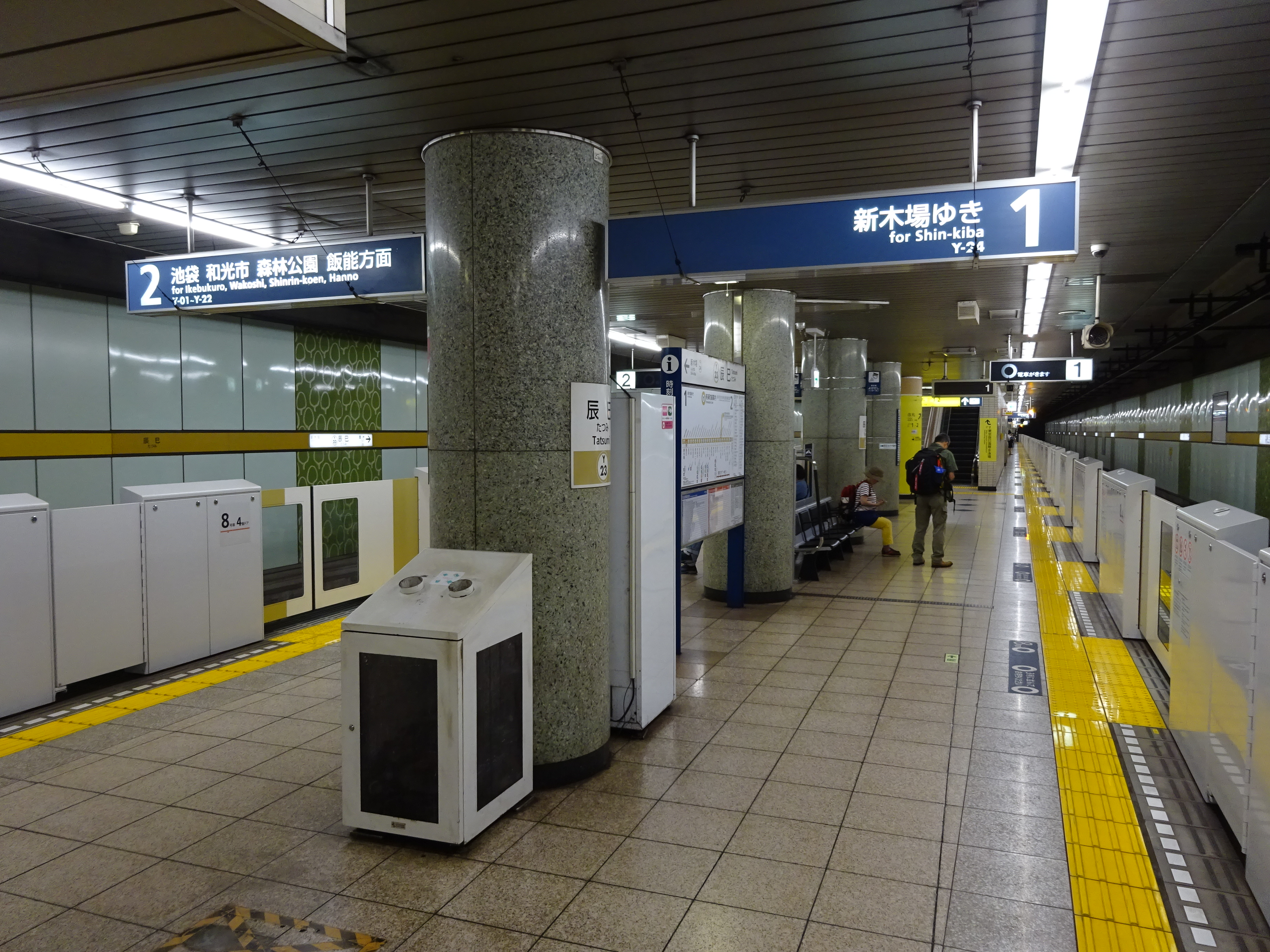
Platform

== Surrounding area ==
- Shinonome Station (Tokyo)
- Tokyo Tatsumi International Swimming Center
