= Ariake Junior College of Education and the Arts =

Coordinates: 35°38′31″N 139°47′50″E

- 有明教育芸術短期大学
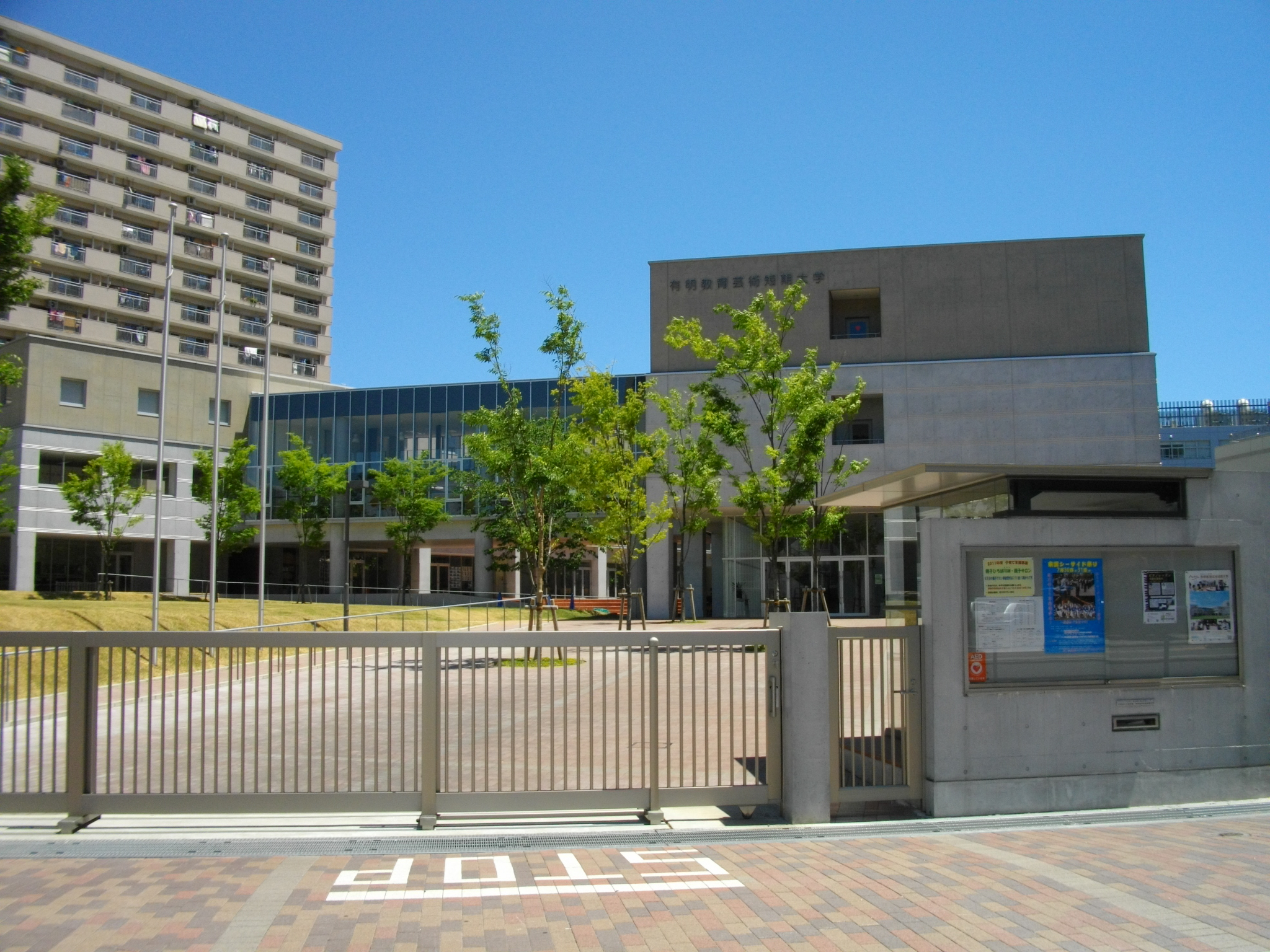
- Main entrance, July 2011
- Former names: Nihon Ongaku Gakko
- Type: Private
- Established: 2009
- Academic staff: Childcare; Art and liberal arts
- Location: Kōtō, Tokyo, Japan
- Website: http://www.ariake.ac.jp/

Ariake Junior College of Education and the Arts (有明教育芸術短期大学, Ariake Kyōiku Geijutsu Tanki Daigaku) is a junior college in Kōtō, Tokyo, Japan.

It was founded in 2009. The predecessor of the school, Nihon Ongaku Gakko, was founded in 1903.
