= Shiomi, Tokyo =

Shiomi 潮見
- District
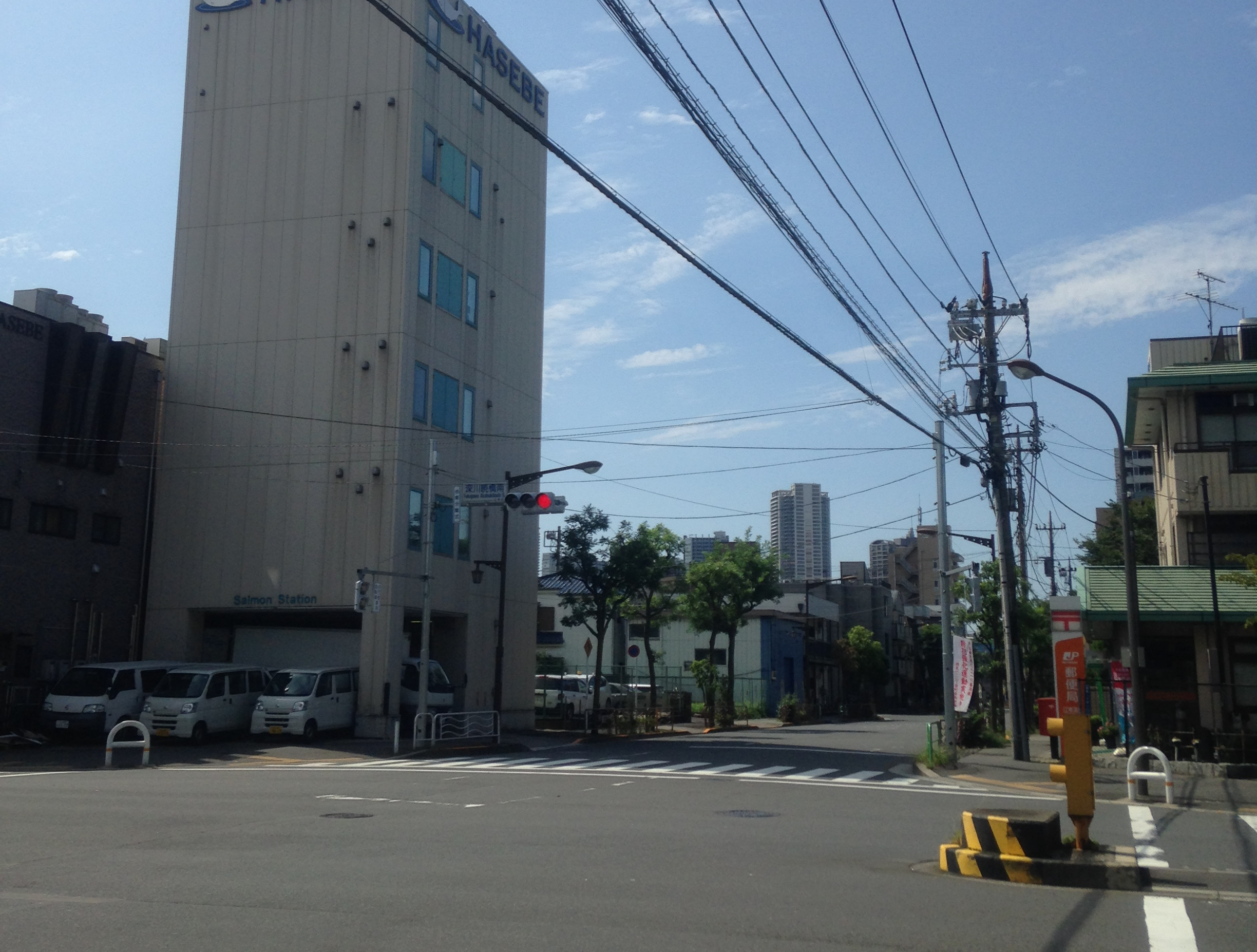
- An intersection in Shiomi

- Location in Tokyo
- Coordinates: 35°39′32.2″N 139°49′02.7″E
- Country: Japan
- Prefecture: Tokyo

Area
  - Total: 0.69 km^{2} (0.27 sq mi)

Population (August 2015)
  - Total: 5,931
- Postal Code: 135-0052

Shiomi (潮見) is a district in Kōtō, Japan.

== Education ==
Koto Ward Board of Education operates public elementary and junior high schools.

Edagawa Elementary School ( 枝川小学校) is the zoned public elementary school for Shiomi.

Fukagawa No. 8 Junior High School (深川第八中学校) is the zoned junior high school for Shiomi.
