= AgeHa =

Weekend club event in Tokyo, Japan

Coordinates: 35°38′32″N 139°49′31″E

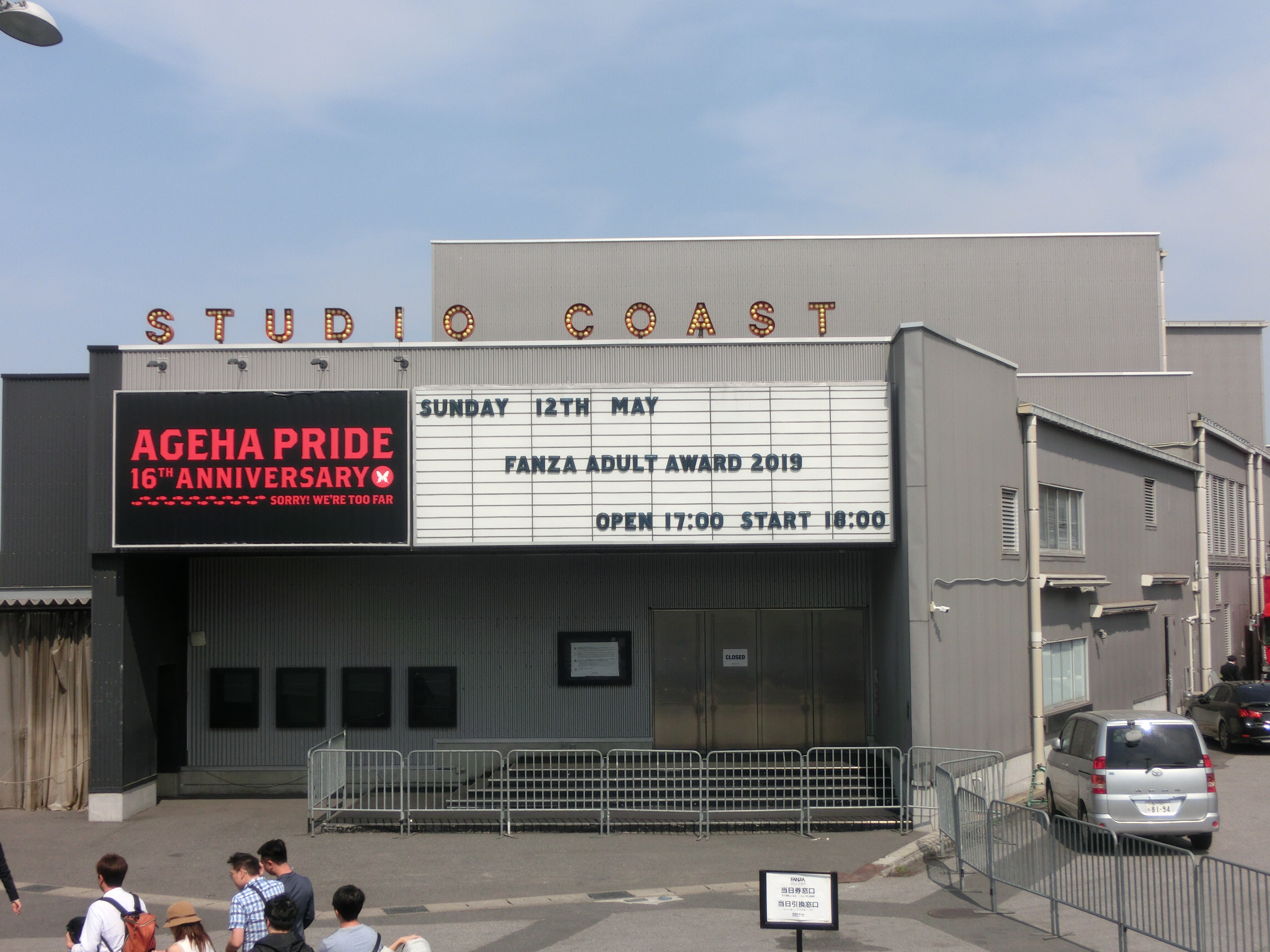
Front entrance of the Studio Coast event space (2019)

ageHa (also known as 'AGH') was a weekend club event in Tokyo, Japan. It was held on Friday and Saturday at the Usen Studio Coast event space in the Shin-Kiba district, which also hosted live concerts and other events. The word Ageha is Japanese for 'Swallowtail butterfly'. The event's name has also been presented in the 3-letter-version 'AGH' in capital letters, for instance on the official staff shirts. If the three letters are pronounced separately in German, they are pronounced as "ah-geh-ha", similar to the Japanese pronunciation of the club's name.

== Description ==
The Studio Coast event space had a large main dance floor, a chill out space, an open terrace with a pool, and an outdoor dance tent. It was located on the waterfront in eastern Tokyo's reclaimed industrial district and had a capacity of over a thousand people.

== Entertainment ==
The event has hosted DJs such as David Guetta, Porter Robinson, Ferry Corsten, Hernán Cattáneo, Armin van Buuren, Deadmau5, Danny Tenaglia, Deep Dish, Markus Schulz, Tiësto, Paul van Dyk, John Digweed, Fatboy Slim, Dave Seaman, Aaron Benjamin, Xpress 2, Don Patrick, Santos, Space Cowboy, and many more.

Japanese DJs who have played there include Yasutaka Nakata of Capsule, Ken Ishii, Tsuyoshi Suzuki (a.k.a. Numanoid), Disco Twins, Ko Kimura, Daishi Dance, and Yoji Biomehanika.

Lounge DJs who have played at Ageha include Japanese event organizer and DJ Shibachoff, and the Irish & Japanese duo Tokyo Sluts.

About once every two months, Ageha hosts a gay dance event now called Shangri-La.

== Closure ==
AgeHa closed on January 30, 2022 after its farewell event known as The Final Weekend.

== See also ==
- Rave
