= Yumenoshima Tropical Greenhouse Dome =

Botanical garden in Koto City, Tokyo, Japan

- 夢の島熱帯植物館
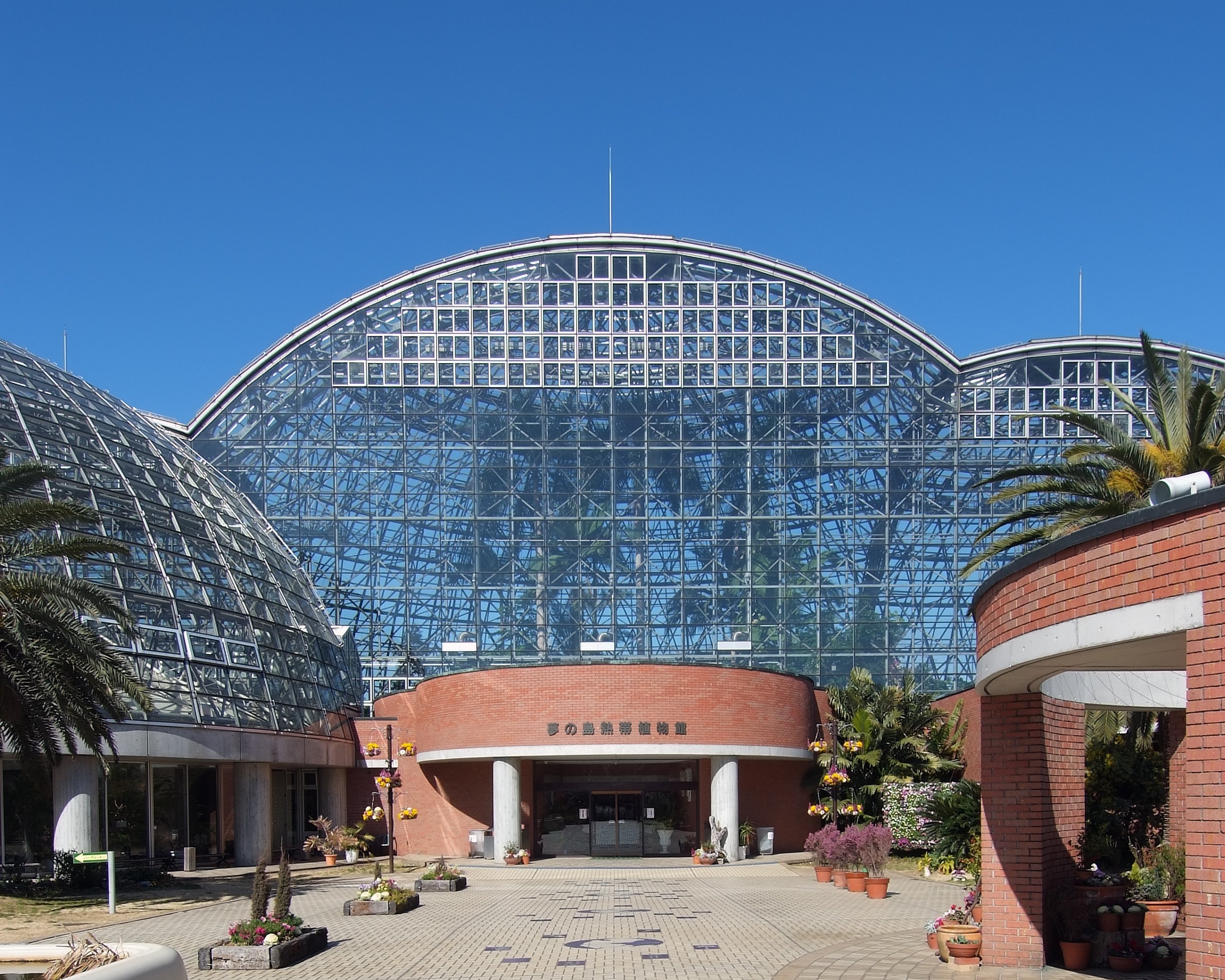
- Interactive map of Yumenoshima Tropical Greenhouse Dome
- Location: 3-2, Yumenoshima, Kōtō, Tokyo, Japan
- Coordinates: 35°39′05″N 139°49′46″E
- Established: 1988
- Operator: Tokyo Metropolitan Park Association
- Species: 1,000
- Website: www.yumenoshima.jp

The Yumenoshima Tropical Greenhouse Dome (夢の島熱帯植物館, Yumenoshima Nettai Shokubutsukan), also sometimes called the Yumenoshima Tropical Plant Dome, is a botanical garden located at 3-2, Yumenoshima, Kōtō, Tokyo, Japan. It is operated by the Tokyo Metropolitan Park Association, and is open daily except on Mondays; an admission fee is charged.

The greenhouse was established in 1988 in Yumenoshima ("Dream Island") Park, a reclaimed landfill and dumping ground in Tokyo Bay. Its three domes, A, B, and C, currently contain about 1,000 species of tropical and semitropical plants. A Dome features a rainforest habitat with ferns and a waterfall, B Dome represents a tropical village, and C Dome contains vegetation of the Ogasawara Islands. There is also a small carnivorous plant room.

== Plants collection ==
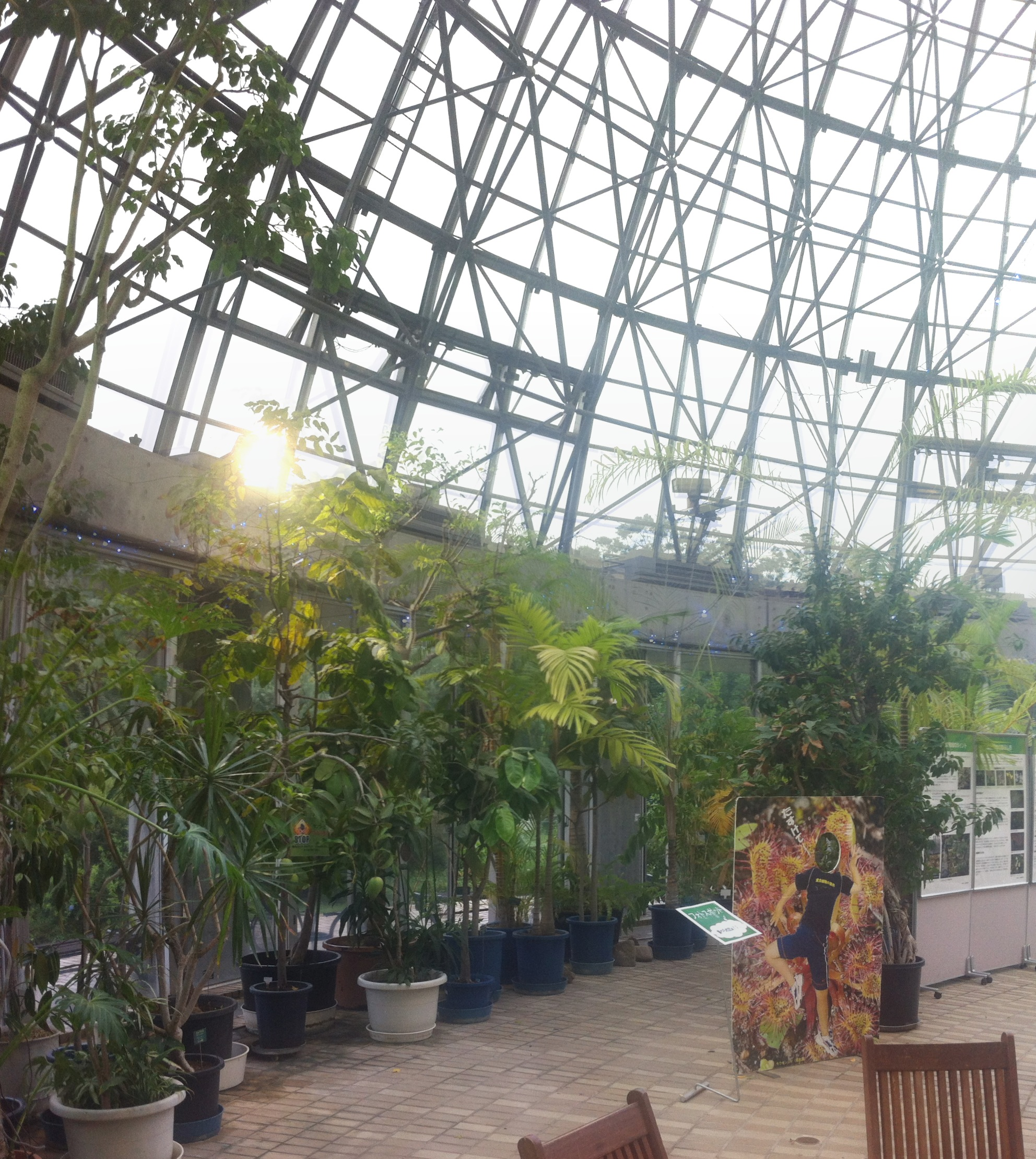
Inside one of the domes, 2014

The domes' plant collections include palms, orchids, aquatic plants, Pandanus, Hevea brasiliensis, Samanea saman, Barringtonia racemosa, Satakentia liukiuensis, Cyathea lepifera, C. mertensiana, C. spinulosa, and Dicksonia antarctica.

== See also ==
- List of botanical gardens in Japan
