= Shurin College of Foreign Languages =

Language school in Tokyo, Japan

Coordinates: 35°41′34″N 139°49′35″E

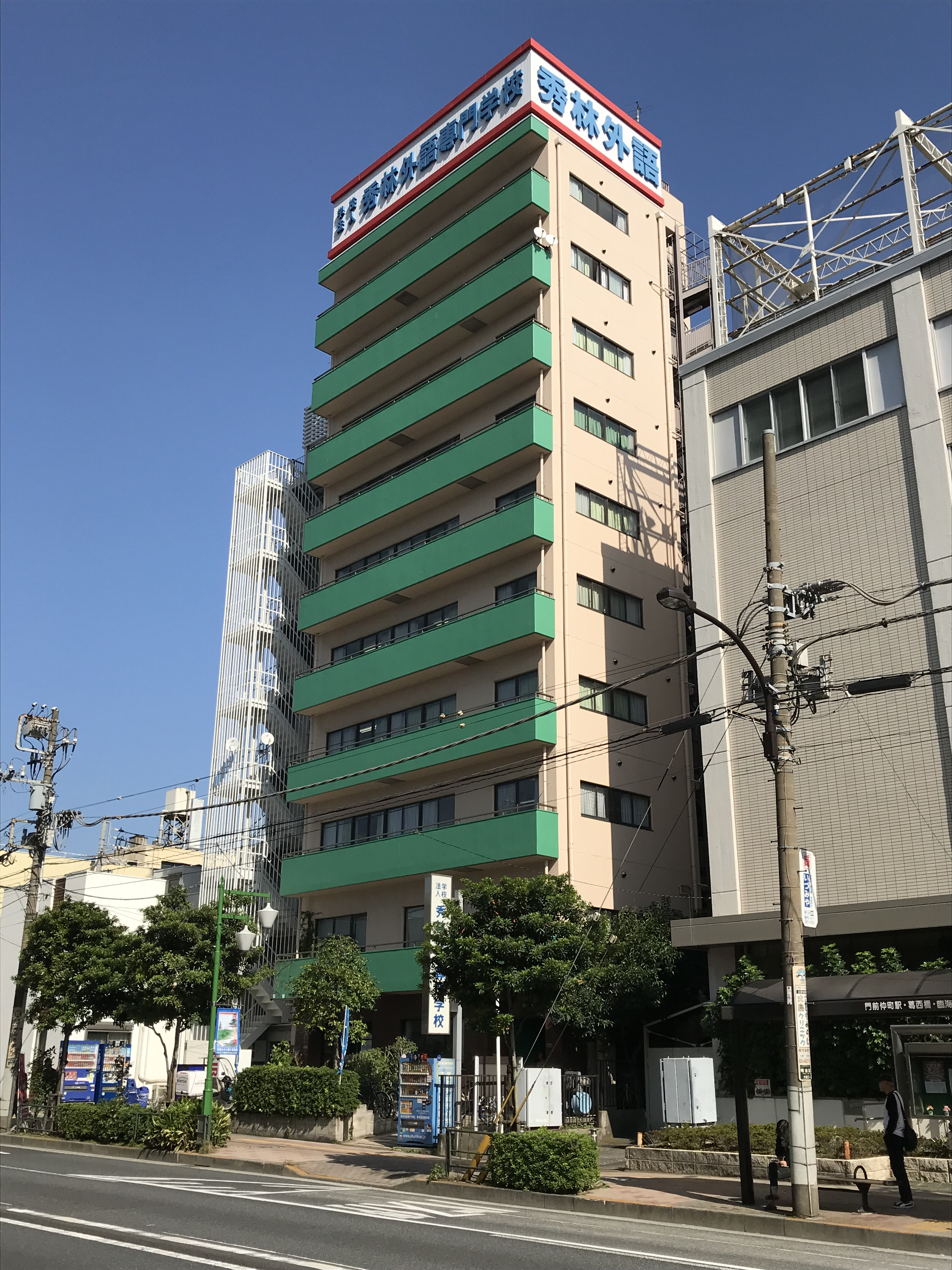

Shurin College of Foreign Languages is a language school in Tokyo, Japan. It offers courses for Japanese-Korean translation, Japanese-Chinese translation, and Business Japanese lessons. It is founded in 1988. It also owns a Japanese language school for foreign students.
