= Yūrakuchō Line =

Yūrakuchō Line may refer to:

- Yūrakuchō Line (Tokyo Metro)
- Seibu Yūrakuchō Line
- Fukutoshin Line, formally called the Yūrakuchō New Line
