= Toyosu =

Neighborhood in Kōtō, Tokyo, Japan

Coordinates: 35°39′18″N 139°47′46″E

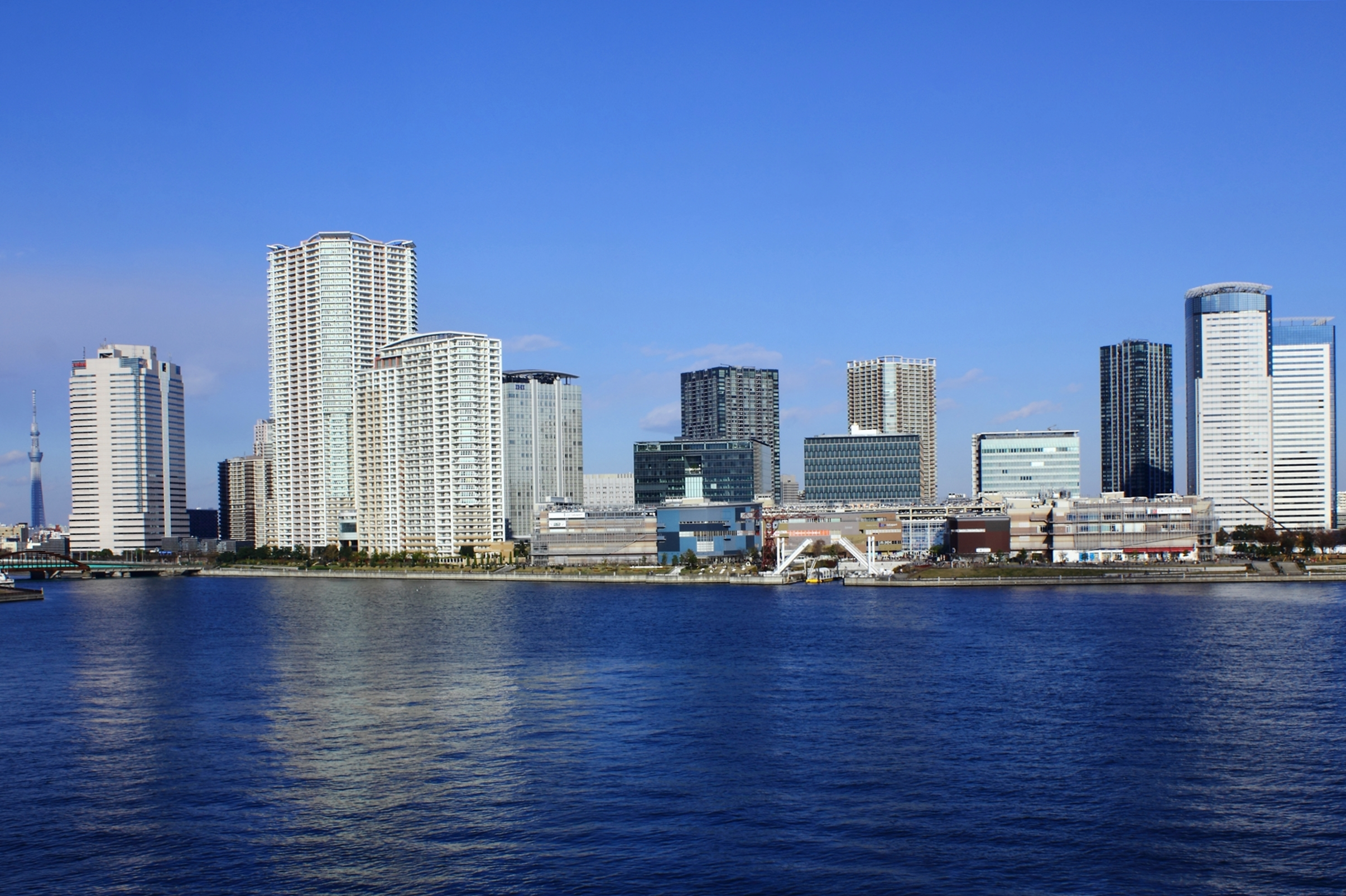
Toyosu as seen from Harumi Ohashi

Toyosu (豊洲) is a neighborhood in Kōtō, Tokyo. Toyosu has six numbered chome ("blocks"). It is the location of the wholesale Toyosu Market, which took the role of the Tsukiji fish market after it became solely a tourist attraction.

Located in Tsukiji in central Tokyo between the Sumida River and the upmarket Ginza shopping district, the wholesale market is open to the trade only and does not allow access to visitors.

== History ==
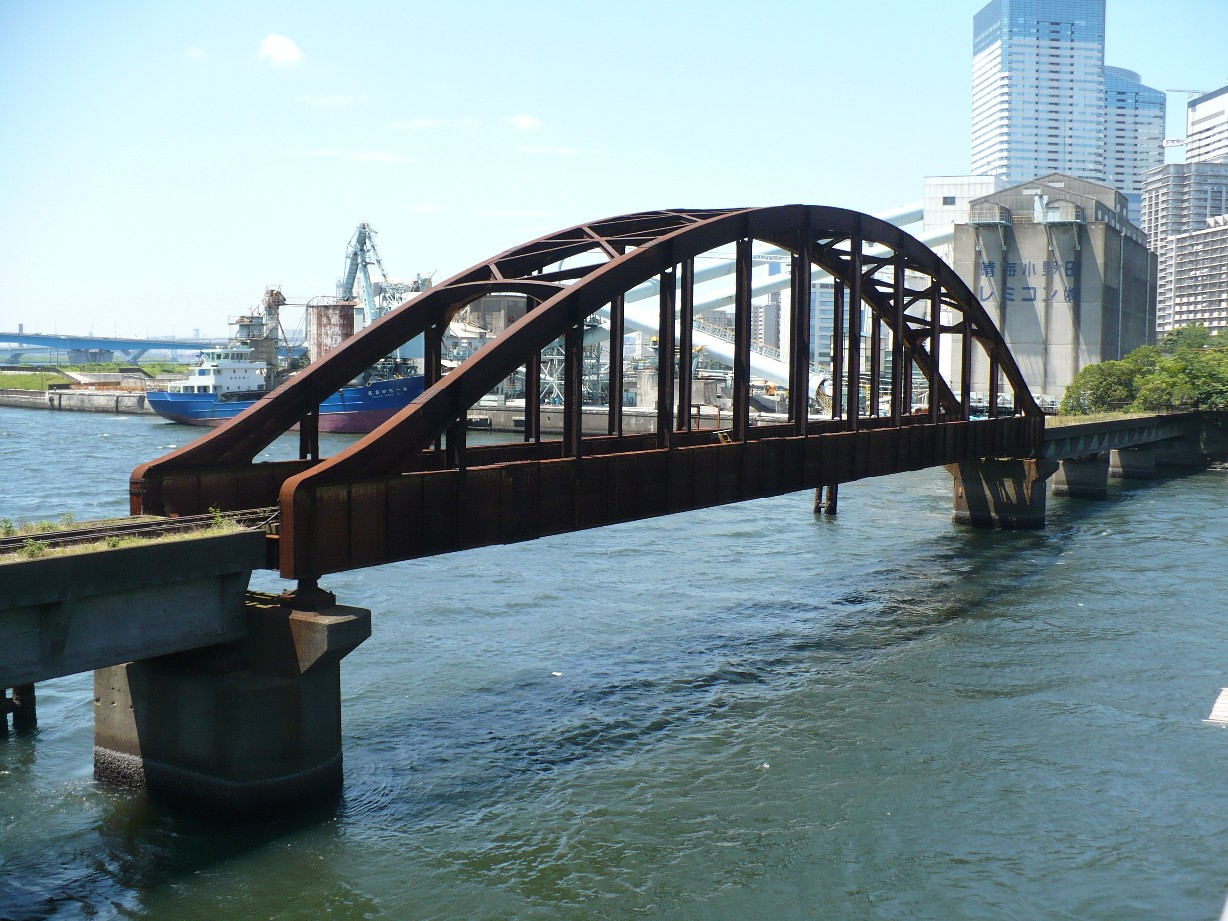
Defunct freight railway bridge

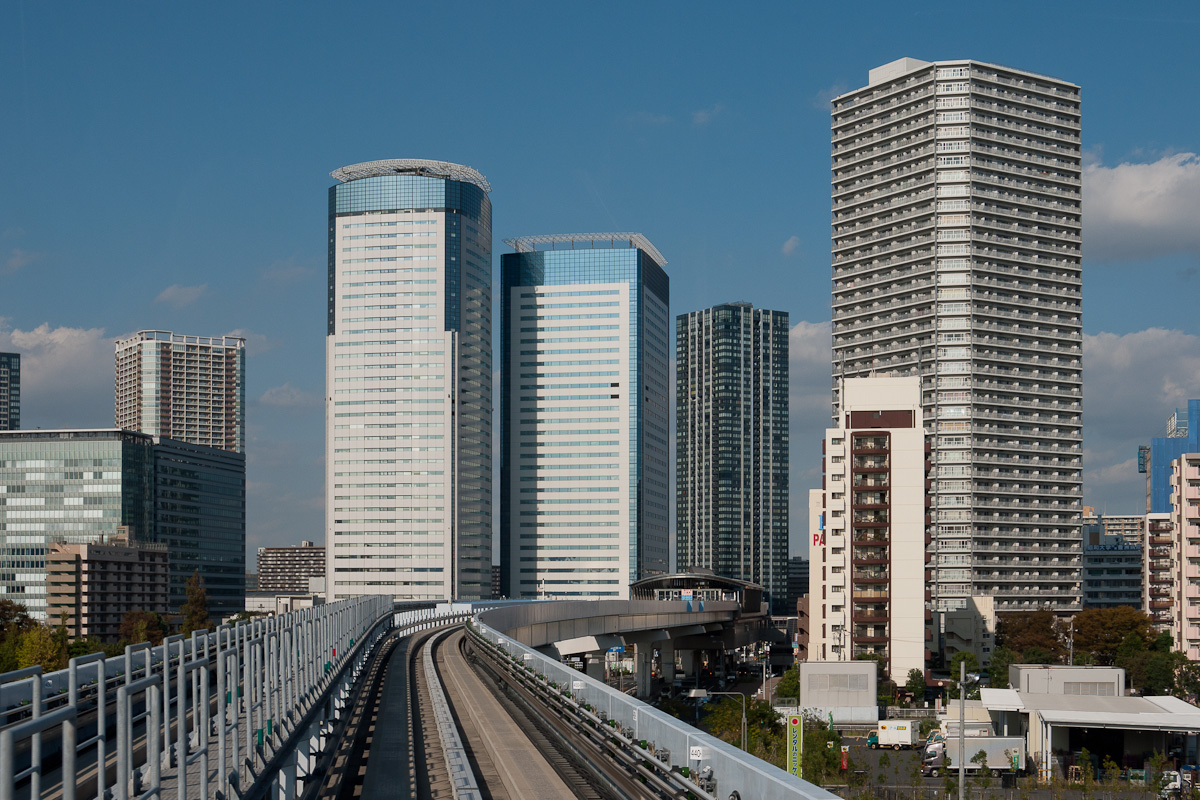
Toyosu Center Building Annex and station

In 1937, the area of Toyosu was created on reclaimed land. There were dockyards, power plants, gas plants, freight stations, and warehouses till the early 1990s. Its proximity to central Tokyo made it valuable real estate, so the redevelopment was robust. Highrise apartments, office buildings, and shopping centres were built one after another.

In 2001, former Governor of Tokyo Shintarō Ishihara chose to relocate Tsukiji fish market to the former gas plant site, but there was a longstanding controversy over this plan due to the area's toxic contamination. The move to Toyosu Market was planned for November 2016, in preparation for the 2020 Summer Olympics in Tokyo. Part of the plan was to retain a retail market, roughly a quarter of the current operation, in Tsukiji.

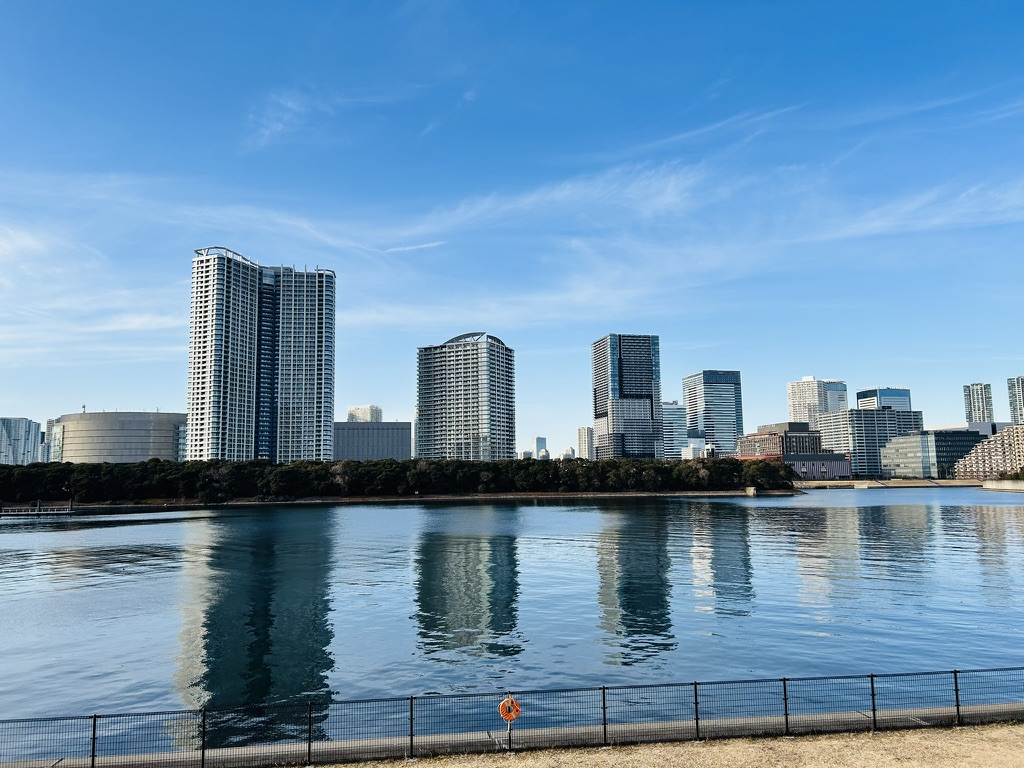
High-rise apartments ("mansions") in Toyosu

On 31 August 2016, the move was postponed. The Tsukiji fish market was caught in a controversy with the shop owners surrounding the former fish market rioting as they would lose their jobs if the market relocated. Opening of the fish market was subsequently rescheduled for 11 October 2018 despite concerns about pollution.

== Education ==
Koto Ward Board of Education operates public elementary and junior high schools.

Toyosu 1-3-chome are zoned to Toyosu North Elementary School (豊洲北小学校). Toyosu 4-chome is zoned to Toyosu Elementary School (豊洲小学校). Toyosu 5-6-chome are zoned to Toyosu West Elementary School (豊洲西小学校).

Toyosu 1-4-chome and much of 5-chome are zoned to Fukagawa 5th Junior High School (深川第五中学校). Toyosu 6-chome and parts of 5-chome are zoned to Ariake Nishi Gakuen (有明西学園) for junior high school.

== Transportation ==
- Toyosu Station (Yurikamome and Tokyo Metro Yurakucho Line)

== Economy ==
- IHI Corporation
- Biprogy
- NTT Data
- Renesas Electronics
- Tokyo Electric Power
- Toyosu Market
