= Tatsumi Parking Area =

Tatsumi Parking Area (辰巳パーキングエリア, Tatsumi Pākingueria) refers two rest areas that are located on the Fukagawa Route of the Shuto Expressway in Tatsumi, Kōtō, Tokyo.

- Tatsumi No. 1 Parking Area
- Tatsumi No. 2 Parking Area
