= Mukojima Route =

Expressway in the Tokyo area

Mukojima Route

Route information
- Length: 10.5 km (6.5 mi)
- Existed: 1971–present

Major junctions
- South end: Edobashi Junction in Chūō City; Inner Circular Route
- Fukagawa Route; Komatsugawa Route
- North end: Horikiri Junction in Katsushika; Central Circular Route

Location
- Country: Japan

Highway system
- National highways of Japan; Expressways of Japan

The Mukojima Route (向島線, Mukojima-sen), signed as Route 6, is one of the tolled routes of the Shuto Expressway system serving the Greater Tokyo Area. It is one two expressways signed as Route 6 in the system, the other expressway signed as Route 6 is the Misato Route. The route is a 10.5-kilometer (6.5 mi) long radial highway running northeast from Chūō City to Katsushika. It connects Tokyo's Inner Circular Route in central Tokyo to the Central Circular Route and the Misato Route, which eventually leads to the Jōban Expressway that connects the Kantō region to the Tōhoku region.

== Route description ==
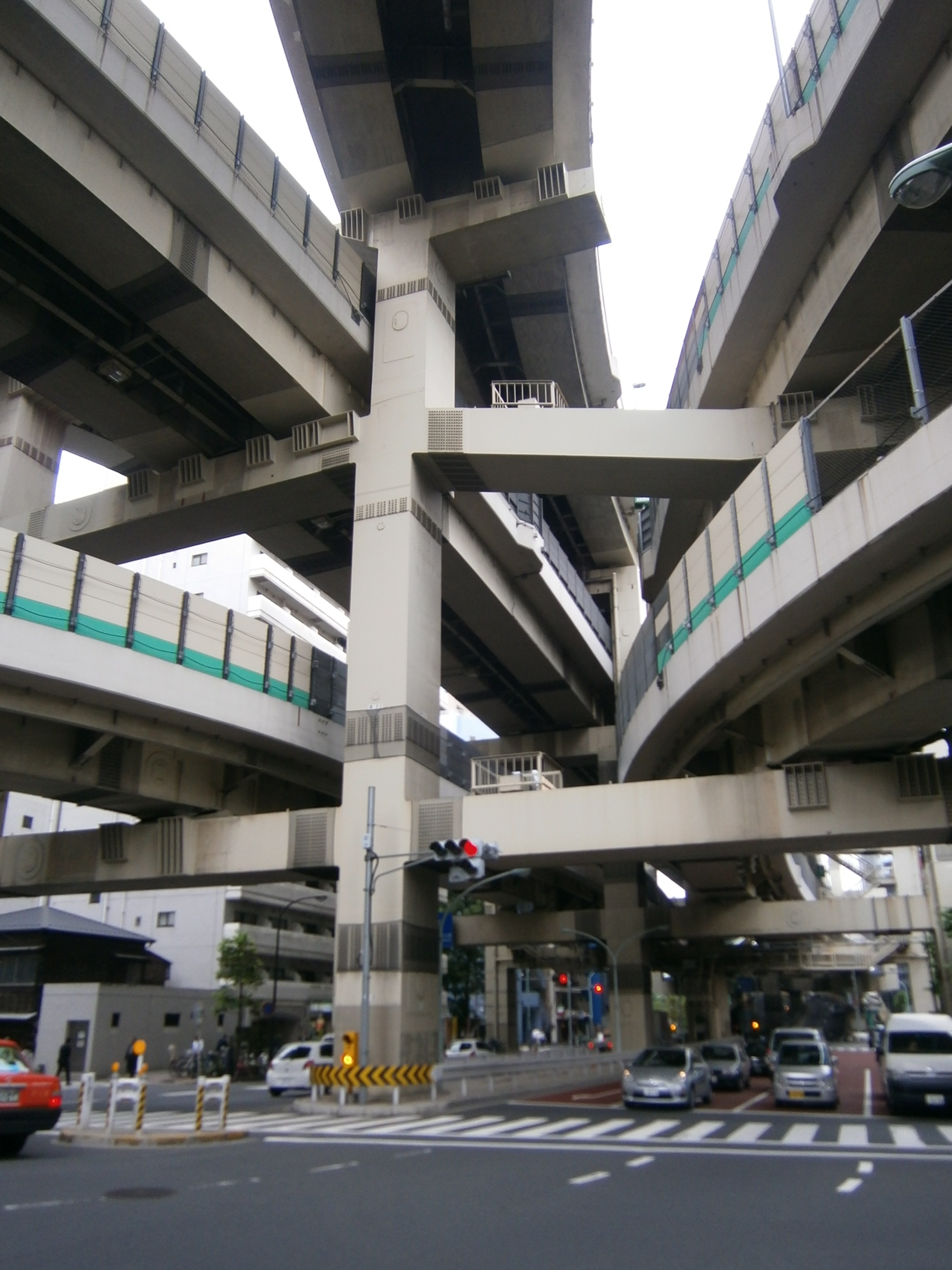
Hakozaki Junction is where routes 6 and 9 meet. It is also the location of the Tokyo City Air Terminal.

Route 6 begins at Edobashi Junction with the Inner Circular Route in Chūō City above Nihonbashi, Japan's kilometre zero. From there it travels northeast through Sumida before crossing over the Arakawa River into Katsushika where Route 6 ends at Horikiri Junction with the northeastern section of the Central Circular Route.

The speed limit on the Mukojima Route is set at 60 km/h.

== History ==
The first section of the Mukojima Route between the expressway's southern terminus at Edobashi Junction and Mukojima, was opened to traffic on 21 March 1971. Hakozaki Junction, where the expressway meets the Fukagawa Route, was opened on 5 February 1980. The final section of the expressway between Mukojima and its northern terminus at Horikiri Junction was opened on 30 March 1982.

== Junction list ==
Location	km	mi	Exit	Name	Destinations	Notes
Chūō	0.0	0.0	—	Edobashi	Inner Circular Route; Ueno Route – Ginza, Yokohama, Chūō Expressway, Rainbow Bridge	Southern terminus
Chūō	0.8	0.50	601, 602	Hakozaki	Fukagawa Route – City Terminal, Narita, Bayshore Route, Higashi-Kantō Expressway, parking area	
Chūō	0.8– 0.9	0.50– 0.56	602, 604	Hamachō	Shin-Ōhashi-dōri	
Chūō	0.9	0.56	603	Kiyosubashi	Kiyosubashi-dōri	
Chūō	2.1	1.3	—	Ryōgoku	Komatsugawa Route east – Keio Expressway	Northbound exit, southbound entrance
Sumida	4.0	2.5	605	Komagata		Northbound exit, southbound entrance; parking area for southbound traffic
Sumida	6.2– 6.3	3.9– 3.9	606, 607	Mukojima	Tokyo Metropolitan Route 461 (Bokutei-dōri) – Mukojima, Kototoi Bridge, Tokyo Skytree	
Sumida	7.5– 8.5	4.7– 5.3	609, 610	Tsutsumidōri	Keyaki-dōri – Bokutei-dōri, Senju	
Katsushika	9.5	5.9	—	Horikiri	Central Circular Route – Misato Route, Tōhoku Expressway, Jōban Expressway, Bayshore Route	Northern terminus
1.000 mi = 1.609 km; 1.000 km = 0.621 mi: Concurrency terminus; Incomplete access; Route transition
