= Fukagawa Route =

Expressway in the Tokyo area

Shuto Expressway Fukagawa Route 首都高速9号深川線

Route information
- Maintained by Metropolitan Expressway Company Limited
- Length: 5.3 km (3.3 mi)
- Existed: 1980–present

Major junctions
- North end: Hakozaki Junction in Chūō; Mukojima Route
- South end: Tatsumi Junction in Kōtō; Bayshore Route

Location
- Country: Japan

Highway system
- National highways of Japan; Expressways of Japan

The Fukagawa Route (深川線, Fukagawa-sen), signed as Route 9, is one of the tolled routes of the Shuto Expressway system serving the Greater Tokyo Area. The route is a 5.3-kilometer (3.3 mi) long radial highway running south from the Tokyo ward of Chūō to the ward of Kōtō. It connects Tokyo's Mukojima Route in central Tokyo to the Bayshore Route which connects Tokyo to its neighboring prefectures, Chiba Prefecture and Kanagawa Prefecture.

== Route description ==
The Fukagawa Route is the northernmost of three routes linking the Bayshore Route to central Tokyo, as such, it primarily links Tokyo to destinations within Chiba Prefecture like Narita International Airport and the capital of the prefecture, Chiba. It is used less heavily than the more direct Komatsugawa Route and Keiyō Road to Chiba, so travel times along the Fukagawa Route to those destinations are often faster than the direct route.

Route 9 begins at Hakozaki Junction with the Mukojima Route in Chūō City above Tokyo City Air Terminal, a bus terminal for Airport Transport Service, an airport bus operator. From there it travels southeast crossing over the Sumida River into Kōtō City. Just before reaching Kiba Park the route turns south entering the part of Kōtō City made up of artificial islands on the northern edge of Tokyo Bay. Upon reaching the bay, the expressway terminates at Tatsumi Junction where it meets the bypass of Tokyo, the Bayshore Route.

The speed limit on the Fukagawa Route is set at 60 km/h.

According to a 2015 survey conducted by the Ministry of Land, Infrastructure, Transport and Tourism, the road carried an average of 52,473 vehicles per day.

== History ==
The entirety of the Fukagawa Route was opened to traffic on 5 February 1980 instead of being opened in phases like many of the other routes in the Shuto Expressway network.

== Junction list ==
Location	km	mi	Exit	Name	Destinations	Notes
Chūō	0.0	0.0	—	Hakozaki	Mukojima Route – Inner Circular Route, Ginza, Tōhoku Expressway, Keiyō Expressway, Jōban Expressway	Northern terminus
Chūō	0.0	0.0	601-604	Hamachō	Kiyosubashi-dōri	Southbound entrance, northbound exit
Kōtō	1.3	0.81	902	Fukuzumi	Tokyo Metropolitan Route 475 – Shin-Ōhashi-dōri, Akihabara	Southbound entrance, northbound exit
Kōtō	1.8	1.1	903	Kiba	Tokyo Metropolitan Route 319 (Mitsume-dōri) – Tatsumi, Meiji-dōri	Southbound exit, northbound entrance
Kōtō	3.1	1.9	904	Shiohama	Tokyo Metropolitan Route 319 (Mitsume-dōri)	Southbound entrance
Kōtō	3.1	1.9	906	Edagawa	Tokyo Metropolitan Route 319 – Toyosu, Eitai-dōri	Northbound exit
Kōtō	5.6	3.5	—	Tatsumi	Bayshore Route – Narita, Higashi-Kantō Expressway, Yokohama, Haneda Airport, Rainbow Bridge	Southern terminus; Tatsumi No. 1 Parking Area is part of the junction
1.000 mi = 1.609 km; 1.000 km = 0.621 mi: Incomplete access
