= Tokyo City Air Terminal =

Bus station in Japan

Tokyo City Air Terminal 東京シティエアターミナル
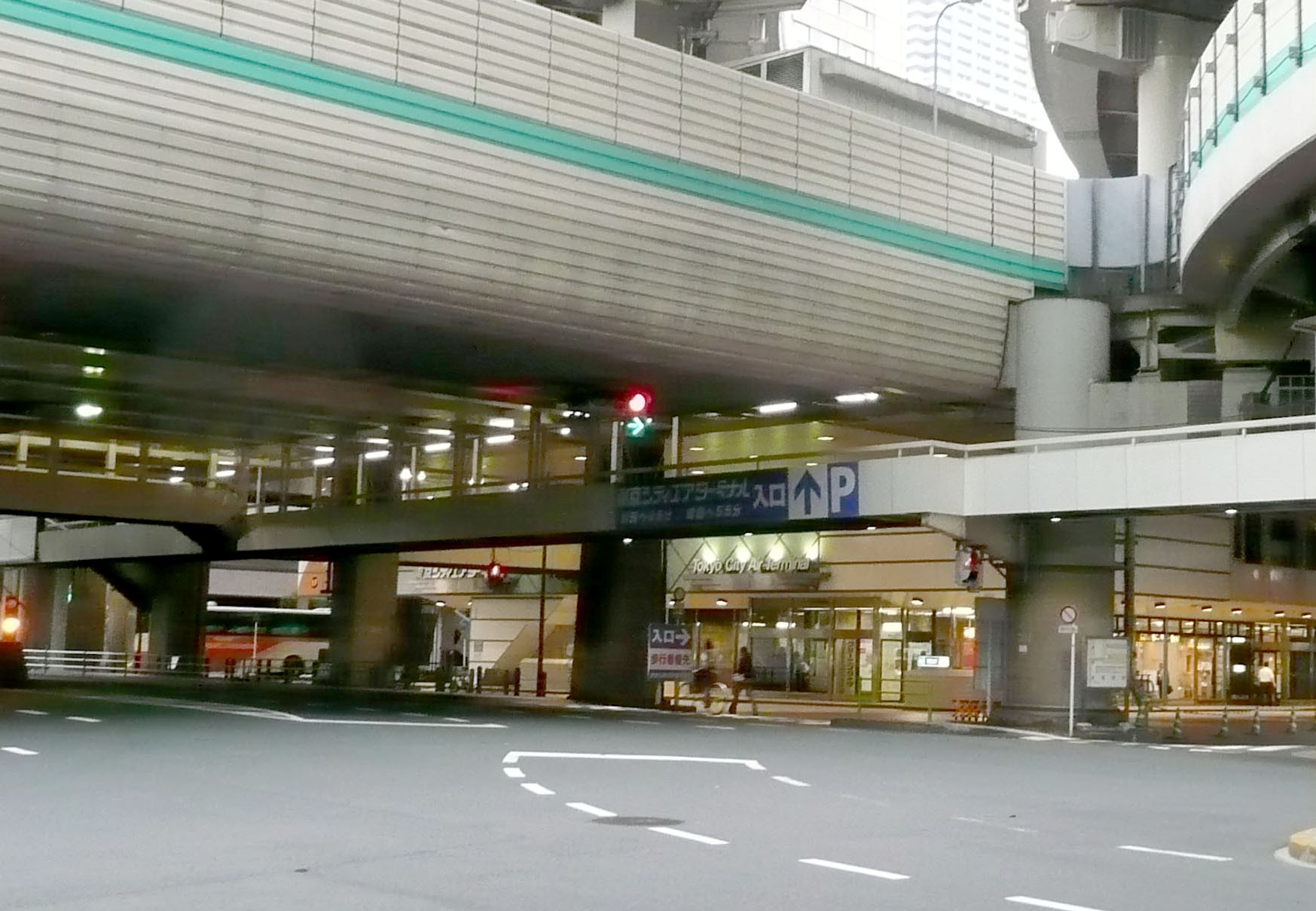

General information
- Location: 42-42-1 Nihonbashi-hakozaki-cho, Chuo, Tokyo; Japan
- Coordinates: 35°40′56″N 139°47′16″E
- System: Airport Transport Service station
- Owner: Tokyo City Air Terminal Co., Ltd.
- Operator: Tokyo City Air Terminal Co., Ltd.
- Bus routes: 2
- Bus stands: 4
- Bus operators: Airport Transport Service
- Connections: Tokyo Metro at Suitengumae Station

Construction
- Parking: 404 lots (30 lots for motorcycles)
- Accessible: Yes

Other information
- Website: Tokyo City Air Terminal T-CAT

History
- Opened: 1 July 1972
Location

Tokyo City Air Terminal (東京シティエアターミナル, Tōkyō shiti ea tāminaru), also known as T-CAT, is a bus terminal for Airport Transport Service, an airport bus operator, in downtown Tokyo, Japan. The terminal is located in Nihonbashi-Hakozaki-cho, Chuo-ku, beneath Hakozaki Junction, the three-way interchange for Shuto Expressway's Mukojima Route and Fukagawa Route, three blocks southeast of Suitengu shrine. T-CAT is a gateway for passengers going to and from Narita International Airport and Tokyo International Airport (Haneda).

The major stockholders in T-CAT's operating company include Japan Airport Terminal Co., Ltd., Keikyu Corporation, Mitsubishi Estate Co., Ltd., Airport Transport Service Co., Ltd., Keisei Electric Railway Co., Ltd., and Airport Facilities Co., Ltd.

== History ==
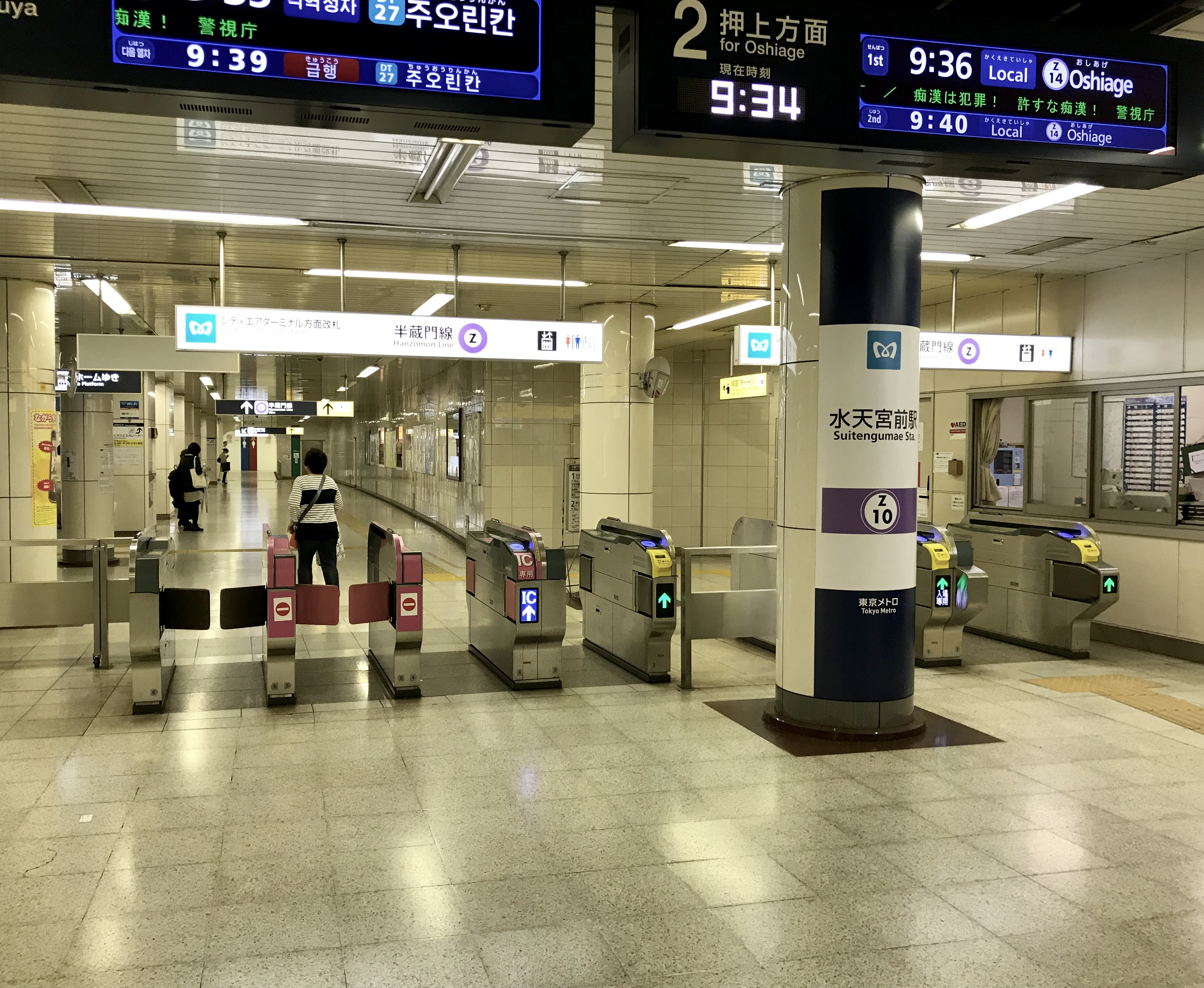
City Air Terminal gates in Tokyo, Japan

T-CAT was opened in 1972 in preparation for the opening of the New Tokyo International Airport (now known as Narita Airport) in 1978. Since Narita Airport is located 66 km (41 mi) from the city, the terminal was intended to increase the convenience of the airport with offering airline check-in facilities until the September 11, 2001 attacks. T-CAT also at one point had exit immigration pre-clearance desks, so that passengers could complete exit formalities at T-CAT and then use a special lane to bypass exit immigration at Narita Airport.

== Configuration ==
=== Information and ticketing ===
A tourist information center on the first floor provides inquiries and various brochures for tourist information. Tickets for Haneda can be purchased on the first floor (ground floor) of the main building, while tickets for Narita can be purchased on the third floor.

=== Gates ===
Departure gates on the third floor are used for Narita Airport bus service, while those on the first floor are used for Haneda. Arrival gates for both Narita and Haneda are located in the first floor.

=== Retail ===
On-site services include an ATM, post office, currency exchange booth, barber shop, rental car counter and dentist's office. T-CAT also has eleven restaurants offering Japanese, Chinese and Western cuisine.

== Connecting transportation ==
A direct underground passageway connects T-CAT with Tokyo Metro at Suitengūmae Station on Hanzomon Line. The terminal is also a short walk from Exit A1 of Ningyōchō Station on the Tokyo Metro Hibiya Line, Exit A3 of Ningyōchō Station on the Toei Asakusa Line, and Exit 4b of Kayabachō Station on the Tokyo Metro Tōzai Line.
