= T-CAT =

T-CAT may refer to:

- Tokyo City Air Terminal
- Tompkins Consolidated Area Transit
