= Tatsumi No. 2 Parking Area =

Rest area in Tokyo, Japan

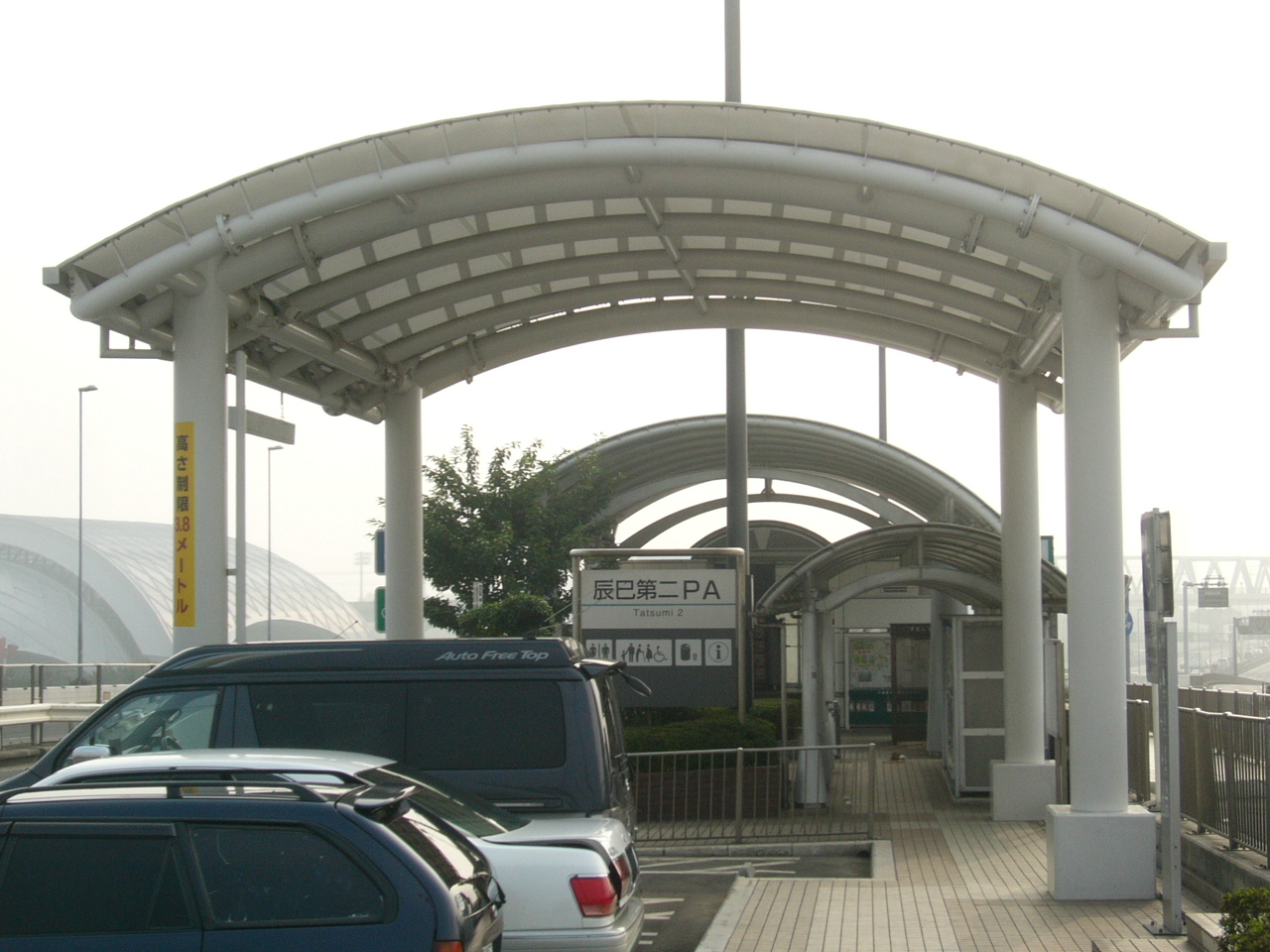

- Location within Special wards of Tokyo

Information
- Native name: 辰巳第一パーキングエリア
- Road: Fukugawa Route
- Location: Tatsumi, Kōtō, Tokyo, Japan
- Coordinates: 35°38′43.3″N 139°48′57.7″E

The Tatsumi No. 2 Parking Area (辰巳第二パーキングエリア, Tatsumi Daini Pākingueria) is a rest area that is located on the Fukagawa Route of the Shuto Expressway in Tatsumi, Kōtō, Tokyo.

In has been in service since October 22, 1991. Located in the Tatsumi Junction, only vehicles heading from the Bayshore Route via Ariake Junction to the Fukagawa Route (Hakozaki area) can be used.
