= Hakozaki Junction =

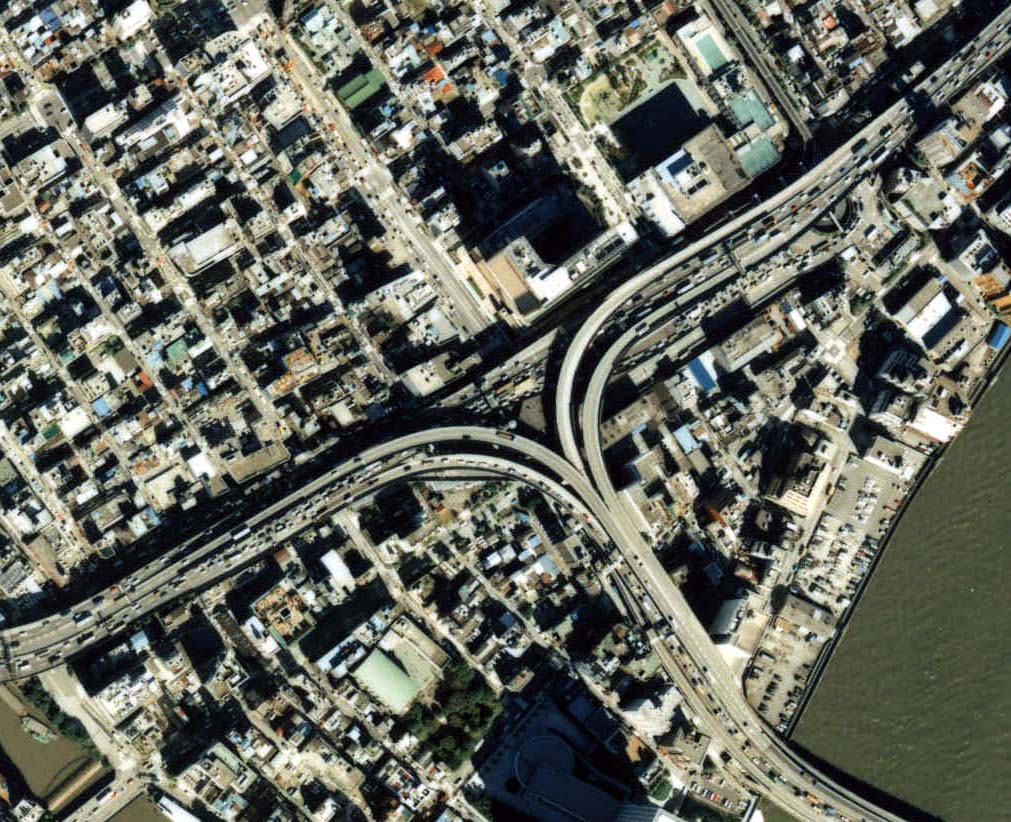
- Aerial photograph of Hakozaki Junction in 1989.

Location
- Nihonbashi, Chūō, Tokyo
- Coordinates: 35°40′53.3″N 139°47′11.3″E

Construction

Hakozaki Junction (箱崎ジャンクション, Hakozaki Jankushon) is a junction on the Shuto Expressway in Chūō, Tokyo, Japan.

== Overview ==
Hakozaki Junction is the junction where the Fukagawa Route meets the Mukojima Route. It is located between the Edobashi Junction, where the Mukojima Route branches off from the Inner Circular Route, and the Ryōgoku Junction, where the Mukojima Route branches off from the Komatsugawa Route. It is one of the most important points on the Shuto Expressway as it is the confluence point for the vehicles traveling from the three routes—the Mukojima Route, the Komatsugawa Route, and the Fukagawa Route—and is well known for its traffic congestion. As the Edobashi Junction is shortly after Hakozaki Junction when traveling towards downtown along the Fukagawa Route, the junction's signage is also marked with C1 to indicate the Inner Circular Route, accessed via Edobashi Junction.

Both ramps leading from the inward- and outward-bound Mukojima Route are two lanes as they join onto the Fukagawa Route. However, as the outward-bound Mukojima Route is four lanes as it comes from Edobashi Junction, the far-left and the far-right lanes are the ones to merge onto the ramp for the Fukagawa Route, as the two left lanes merge from the counterclockwise running Inner Circular Route and the two right lanes merge from the clockwise running Inner Circular Route. Previously, there had been no ramp from the left-hand side of the Mukojima Route with the two left lanes instead continuing on the Mukojima Route and the two right lanes merging onto the Fukagawa Route, requiring drivers travelling from the counter-clockwise Inner Circular Route to cross at least two lanes of traffic when merging onto the Fukagawa Route. In order to eliminate congestion caused by this weaving traffic, improvements were made to Hakozaki Junction from 1994 to 1998 in order to add on the far-left lane ramp.

The bottom tier of Hakozaki Junction consists of the one-way Hakozaki Rotary. On the east side of the rotary is the Hakozaki Parking Area. The rotary has a unique design in which the entrance from Hazokazi merges onto the rotary on the west side while the entrances from Hamamachi and Kiyosubashi merge on from the east side, coming together to lead to either the Mukojima Route or the Fukagawa Route. Also, as the purpose of the Hakozaki Rotary is to merge together the entering traffice from Hakozaki, Hamamachi, Kiyosubashi, and the Hakozaki Parking Area and connect it to the expressways, there is no need for traffic already on the expressways to traverse the rotary.

It has gained the nickname Yamata no Orochi due to its appearance resembling the legendary eight-headed serpent when looking up at the junction from below .
