= Keiyō Junction =

Road junction in Ichikawa, Chiba, Japan

- 京葉ジャンクション; Keiyō Jankushon; Keiyō JCT
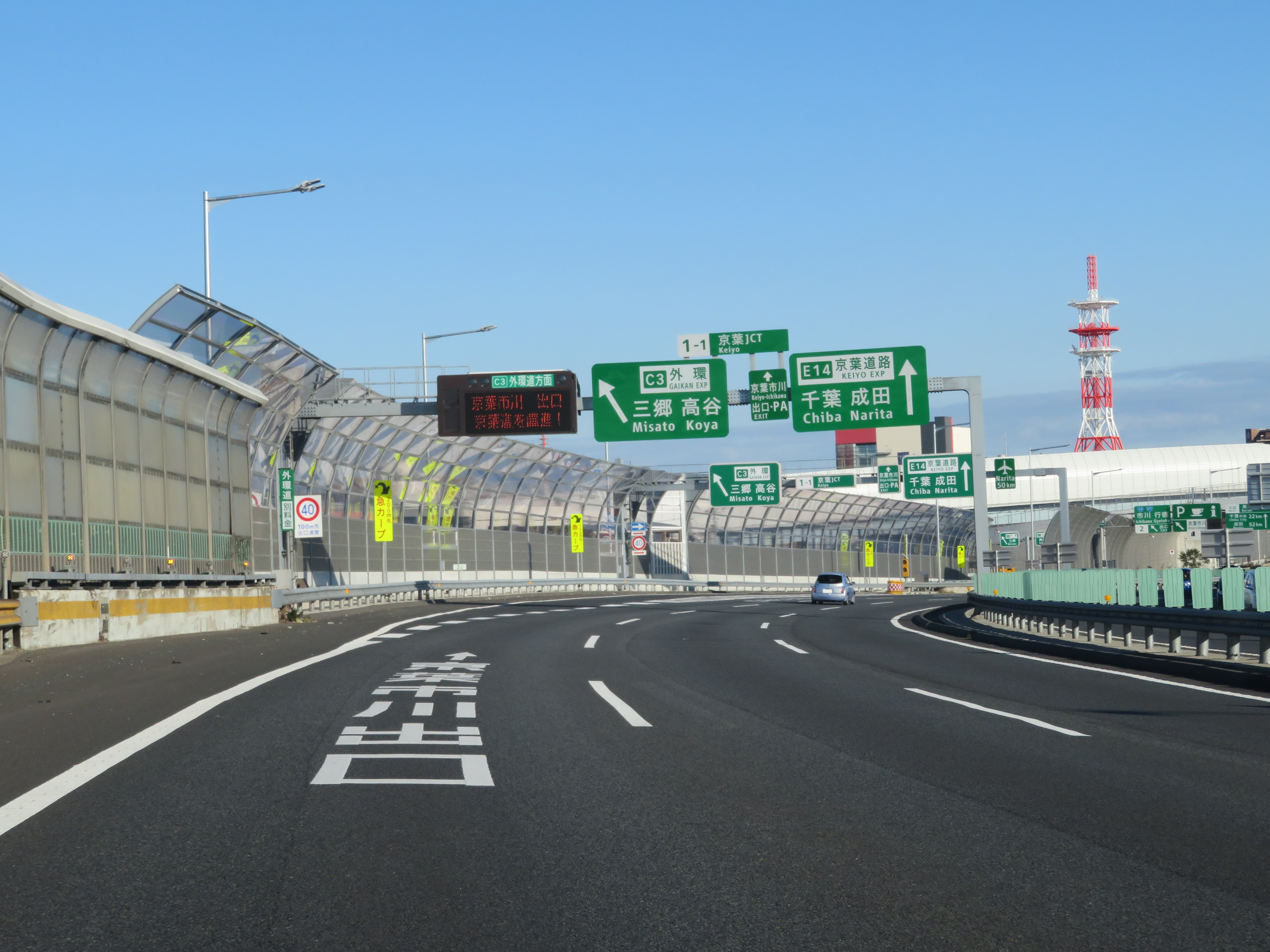
- Interactive map of Keiyō Junction

Location
- Tokagi, Ichikawa, Chiba
- Coordinates: 35°42′36.3″N 139°45′26.6″E

Construction

The Keiyō Junction (京葉ジャンクション, Keiyō Jankushon) is a junction that connects the Tokyo Gaikan Expressway and Keiyō Road in Tokagi, Ichikawa, Chiba.

== Structure ==
The Tokyo Gaikan Expressway runs under Keiyō Road, the rampway connecting the two roads under it, and National Route 298 running over both roads, making it an extremely complex structure. The branch point of the Tokyo Gaikan Expressway is underground, and the ramp cannot be seen from the aerial photograph. When completed, Tokyo Gaikan Expressway and Keiyo Road are planned to be passable in all directions, but currently two of the eight ramps are under construction.

In addition, the Onidaka Parking Area was closed on March 31, 2012 due to the construction of Keiyō Junction. On April 24, 2018, the Keiyō Ichikawa Parking Area (outbound line only) was newly put into service at the same location.

=== Current routes ===
- [Ramp F] Tokyo Gaikan Expressway Inner Loop (Koya) → Keiyo Road Inbound Line (Tokyo)
- [Ramp D] Tokyo Gaikan Expressway Outer Loop (Misato) → Keiyo Road Inbound Line (Tokyo)
- [Ramp H] Tokyo Outer Ring Expressway (Misato) → Keiyo Road Outbound Line (Chiba)
- [Ramp A] Keiyo Road Inbound Line (Chiba) → Tokyo Gaikan Expressway Inner Loop (Misato)
- [Ramp E] Keiyo Road Outbound Line (Tokyo) → Tokyo Gaikan Expressway Inner Loop (Misato)
- [Ramp C] Keiyo Road Outbound Line (Tokyo) → Tokyo Gaikan Expressway Outer Loop (Takaya)

=== Future routes ===
- [Ramp B] Tokyo Gaikan Expressway Inner Loop (Koya) → Keiyo Road Outbound Line (Chiba)
- [Ramp G] Keiyo Road Inbound Line (Chiba) → Tokyo Gaikan Expressway Outer Loop (Takaya)
