= Komatsugawa Route =

Expressway in the Tokyo area

Shuto Expressway Komatsugawa Route 首都高速7号小松川線

Route information
- Maintained by Metropolitan Expressway Company Limited
- Length: 10.4 km (6.5 mi)
- Existed: 1971–present

Major junctions
- West end: Ryōgoku Junction in Sumida; Mukojima Route
- Central Circular Route
- East end: Keiyō Road in Edogawa

Location
- Country: Japan

Highway system
- National highways of Japan; Expressways of Japan

The Komatsugawa Route (小松川線, Komatsugawa-sen), signed as Route 7, is one of the tolled routes of the Shuto Expressway system serving the Greater Tokyo Area. The route is a 10.4-kilometer (6.5 mi) long radial highway running east from the Tokyo ward of Sumida to the ward of Edogawa. It connects Tokyo's Mukojima Route in central Tokyo to the Keiyō Road which connects Tokyo to Chiba Prefecture and its capital, the city of Chiba.

== Route description ==
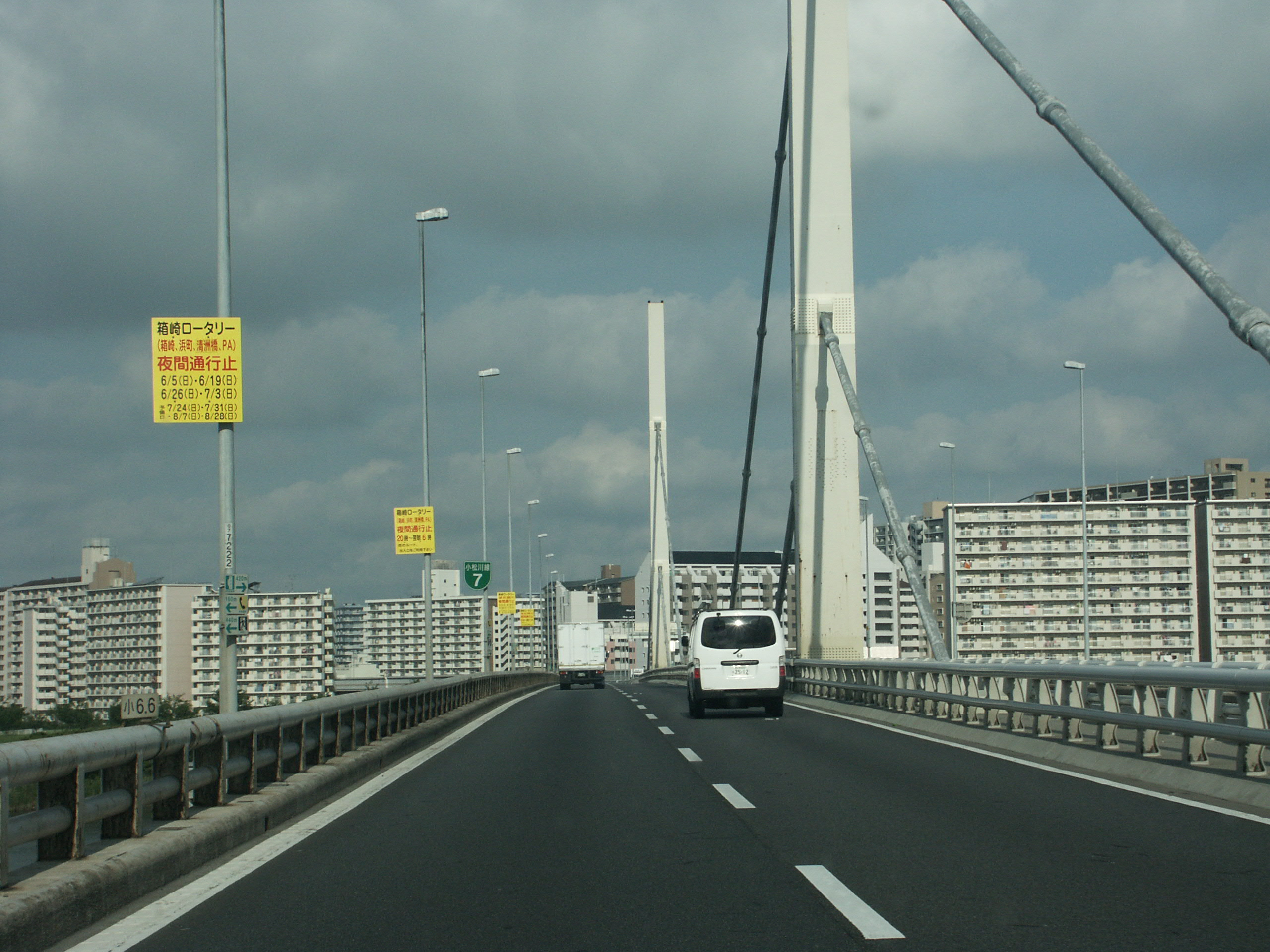
The Komatsugawa Route passing over the Arakawa River.

The Komatsugawa Route begins at Ryōgoku Junction with the Mukojima Route in Sumida ward above the Sumida River. From there it travels east through Sumida and Kōtō parallel to National Route 14 and the Sōbu Line before crossing over the Arakawa River in Edogawa. At this crossing the Komatsugawa Route passes beneath the Central Circular Route. The expressway has two junctions with local roads east of the crossing in Edogawa. After those junctions the expressway leaves the Shuto Expressway network, from there it continues east towards Chiba as the Keiyō Road.

The speed limit on the Komatsugawa Route is set at 60 km/h.

== History ==
The entirety of the Komatsugawa Route was opened to traffic on 21 March 1971. The expressway was extensively rehabilitated in November 1991 under the project name "Route 7 Refresh Plan". On 16 February 2015, the expressway was temporarily closed in Edogawa due to a fire that broke out during construction work on the route. The incident claimed the lives of two workers.

In preparation for increased congestion during the 2020 Summer Olympics, new traffic-control systems were installed along many expressways in the Tokyo area. The only instance of further controls being installed along the expressway was at its western terminus at Ryōgoku Junction

An additional interchange between the Central Circular Route and the Komatsugawa Route was opened on 1 December 2019. Part of the project to add the junction included upgrades to the already extant interchange at Komatsugawa.

== Junction list ==
Location	km	mi	Exit	Name	Destinations	Notes
Sumida	0.0	0.0	—	Ryōgoku	Mukojima Route – Ginza	Western terminus; eastbound entrance, westbound exit
Sumida	2.0	1.2		Kinshichō Toll Booth		
Sumida	2.3– 2.8	1.4– 1.7	701/702	Kinshichō	Tokyo Metropolitan Route 465 (Yotsume-dōri) – to National Route 14, Oshiage, Tokyo Skytree	
Edogawa	6.6	4.1	—	Komatsugawa	Central Circular Route – to Tōhoku Expressway, Jōban Expressway	Eastbound entrance, westbound exit
Edogawa	7.0	4.3	703	Komatsugawa	Tokyo Metropolitan Route 308 (Funabori-kaidō) – Shinkoiwa, Funabori	Eastbound exit, westbound entrance
Edogawa	8.4	5.2	705	Ichinoe	Tokyo Metropolitan Route 318 (Kannana-dōri) – Haruechō	Eastbound exit, westbound entrance
Edogawa	10.4	6.5	—		Keiyō Road – to Tokyo-Gaikan Expressway, Chiba	Eastern terminus, expressway continues as the Keiyō Road
1.000 mi = 1.609 km; 1.000 km = 0.621 mi: Incomplete access; Route transition
