= Misato Route =

Expressway in the Tokyo area

Shuto Expressway Misato Route 首都高速6号三郷線

Route information
- Maintained by Metropolitan Expressway Company Limited
- Length: 10.6 km (6.6 mi)
- Existed: 1985–present

Major junctions
- South end: Kosuge Junction in Katsushika, Tokyo; Central Circular Route
- North end: Misato Junction in Misato, Saitama; Tokyo Gaikan Expressway; National Route 298; Jōban Expressway

Location
- Country: Japan

Highway system
- National highways of Japan; Expressways of Japan

The Misato Route (三郷線, Misato-sen), signed as Route 6, is one of the tolled routes of the Shuto Expressway system serving the Greater Tokyo Area and is one of five of the routes in the system serving Saitama Prefecture despite not being given a designation to signify this. It is one of two expressways signed as Route 6 in the system; the other expressway signed as Route 6 is the Mukojima Route. The route is a 10.6-kilometer (6.6 mi) long radial highway running northeast from Katsushika in Tokyo to the city of Misato in Saitama Prefecture. Alongside the Mukojima Route, it connects Tokyo's Inner Circular Route in central Tokyo to the Jōban Expressway, which connects the Kantō region to the Tōhoku region.

== Route description ==
The Misato Route begins at Kosuge Junction with the Central Circular Route in Katsushika as an indirect continuation north for the Mukojima Route, the other expressway signed as Route 6 on the Shuto Expressway network. From this southern terminus, it travels northeast out of Katsushika, crossing in to Adachi, Tokyo. The expressway is paralleled by the Ayase River along its route through Tokyo, upon entering Saitama Prefecture, the expressway curves to the northeast away from the river. In Saitama the expressway passes through the city of Yashio before entering the city of Misato where it meets its northern terminus at Misato Junction where it intersects the Tokyo Gaikan Expressway. From there, the expressway continues north as the Jōban Expressway, leaving the Shuto Expressway network.

The speed limit is set at 60 km/h between Kosuge Junction and the interchange at Kahei. The remainder of the route has a speed limit of 80 km/h.

== History ==
The entirety of the Misato Route was opened to traffic on 24 January 1985 instead of being opened in phases like many of the other routes in the Shuto Expressway network.

== Junction list ==
Prefecture	Location	km	mi	Exit	Name	Destinations	Notes
Tokyo	Katsushika	0.0	0.0	—	Kosuge	Central Circular Route – Bayshore Route, Higashi-Kantō Expressway, Mukojima Route, Circle 1, Tōmei Expressway, Chūō Expressway, Ōmiya, Higashi-Ikebukuro	Southern terminus
Tokyo	Adachi	2.2– 2.3	1.4– 1.4	651,652,653,654	Kahei	Tokyo Metropolitan Route 318 (Kannana-dōri Avenue) – Nishiarai, Kameari	Parking area
Saitama	Yashio	5.2– 6.1	3.2– 3.8	655,656	Yashio-minami	Saitama Prefecture Route 116 – Koshigaya, Matsudo, Sōka	
Saitama	Yashio	7.0	4.3	—	Yashio Parking Area		Parking area is only for southbound traffic
Saitama	Yashio	7.1	4.4	657	Yashio	Saitama Prefecture Route 116 – Sōka, Misato	Northbound exit, southbound entrance
Saitama	Misato	10.2	6.3	661	Misato	Tokyo Gaikan Expressway – Ōizumi, Matsudo; National Route 298 – Kan-etsu Expressway, Tōhoku Expressway, Sōka, Central Misato; Jōban Expressway – Mito	Northern terminus; expressway continues as the Jōban Expressway
1.000 mi = 1.609 km; 1.000 km = 0.621 mi: Incomplete access; Route transition
