= Hakozaki Parking Area =

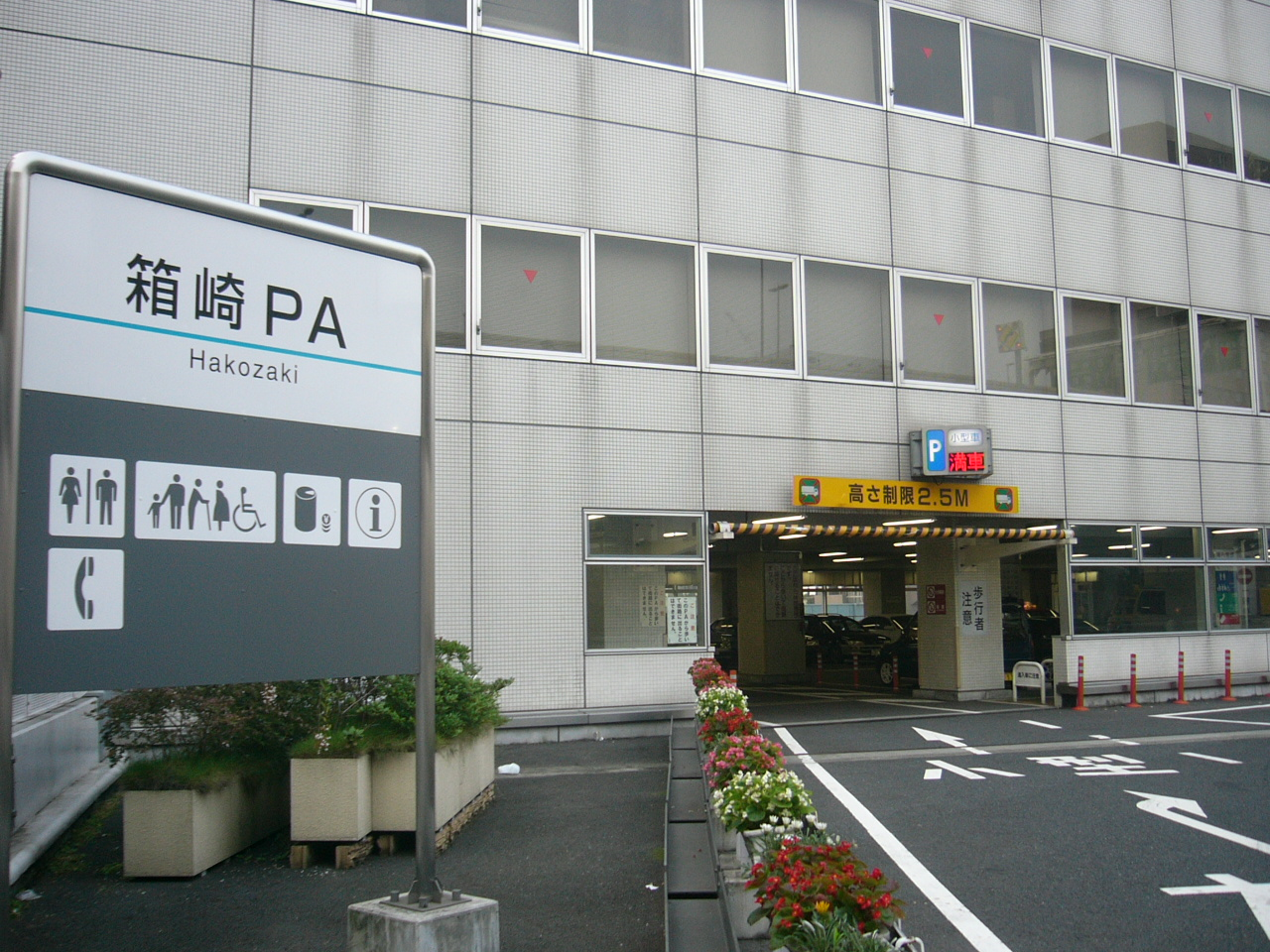

- Location within Special wards of Tokyo

Information
- Native name: 箱崎パーキングエリア
- Road: Mukojima Route
- Location: 103-0015 Nihonbashi, Hakozakicho, Chūō, Tokyo, Japan
- Coordinates: 35°40′56.6″N 139°47′20.3″E

The Hakozaki Parking Area (箱崎パーキングエリア, Hakozaki Pākingueria) is a rest area located on the Mukojima Route of the Shuto Expressway in Chūō, Tokyo.

There are very few guide signs for the Hakozaki Parking Area on the Shuto Expressway Main Line. This is because the parking lot is extremely small, and guide signs would lead to increase in the number of travelers who stop there, and the parking lot would easily become congested (as it is written on the bulletin board in the parking area). Because of this, many people do not know that the Hakozaki Parking Area exists, and it is also called "Phantom Parking Area".
