= Suitengūmae Station =

Railway station in Tokyo, Japan

Coordinates: 35.6826°N 139.7852°E

Suitengumae Station 水天宮前駅

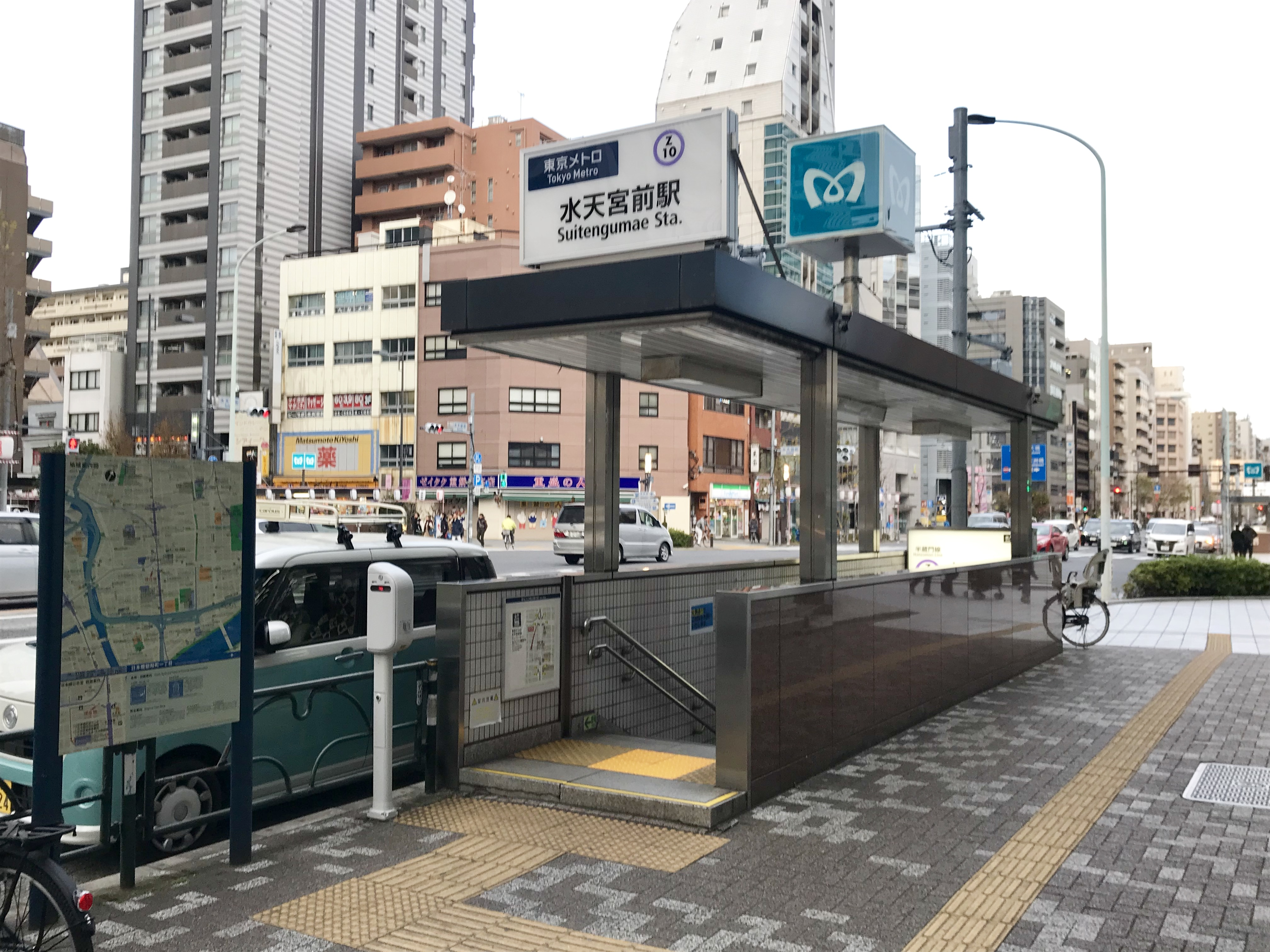
- Exit 6 in January 2019

General information
- Location: 2-1-1 Nihonbashi Kakigaracho, Chūō, Tokyo; Japan
- Operator: Tokyo Metro
- Line: Hanzōmon Line
- Platforms: 1 island platform
- Tracks: 2
- Connections: Ningyocho Station; Bus stop; T-CAT

Construction
- Structure type: Underground

Other information
- Station code: Z-10

History
- Opened: 28 November 1990; 35 years ago

Services
Preceding station	Tokyo Metro	Following station
Mitsukoshimae towards Shibuya	Hanzōmon Line	Kiyosumi-shirakawa towards Oshiage
Location
- Location within Tokyo Yamanote Loop Location within Tokyo wards area Location within Japan

Suitengūmae Station (水天宮前駅, Suitengūmae-eki) is a subway station on the Tokyo Metro Hanzomon Line in Chūō, Tokyo, operated by the Tokyo subway operator Tokyo Metro. It is connected by moving walkways to the Tokyo City Air Terminal, and Ningyocho Station is located 500 meters to the northwest (although there is no transfer corridor between the two stations).

== Lines ==
Suitengūmae Station is served by the Tokyo Metro Hanzōmon Line, and is numbered Z-10.

== Station layout ==
1	Hanzōmon Line	for Otemachi and Shibuya; Den-en-toshi Line for Chūō-Rinkan
2	Hanzomon Line	for Kinshicho and Oshiage; Tobu Skytree Line for Tōbu-Dōbutsu-Kōen; Tobu Isesaki Line for Kuki; Tōbu Nikkō Line for Minami-Kurihashi

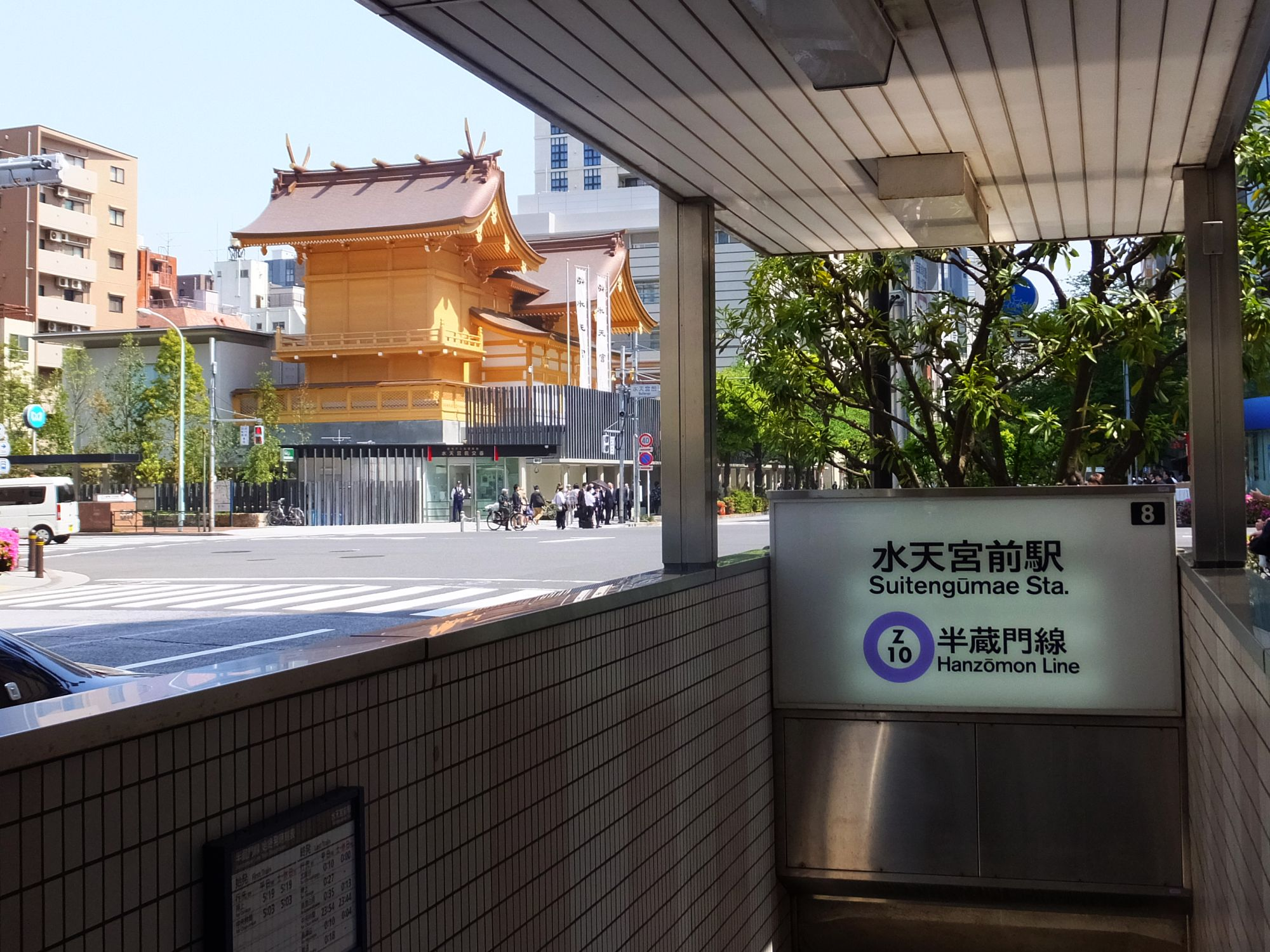
Entrance 8 and Suiten-gu Shrine in 2016

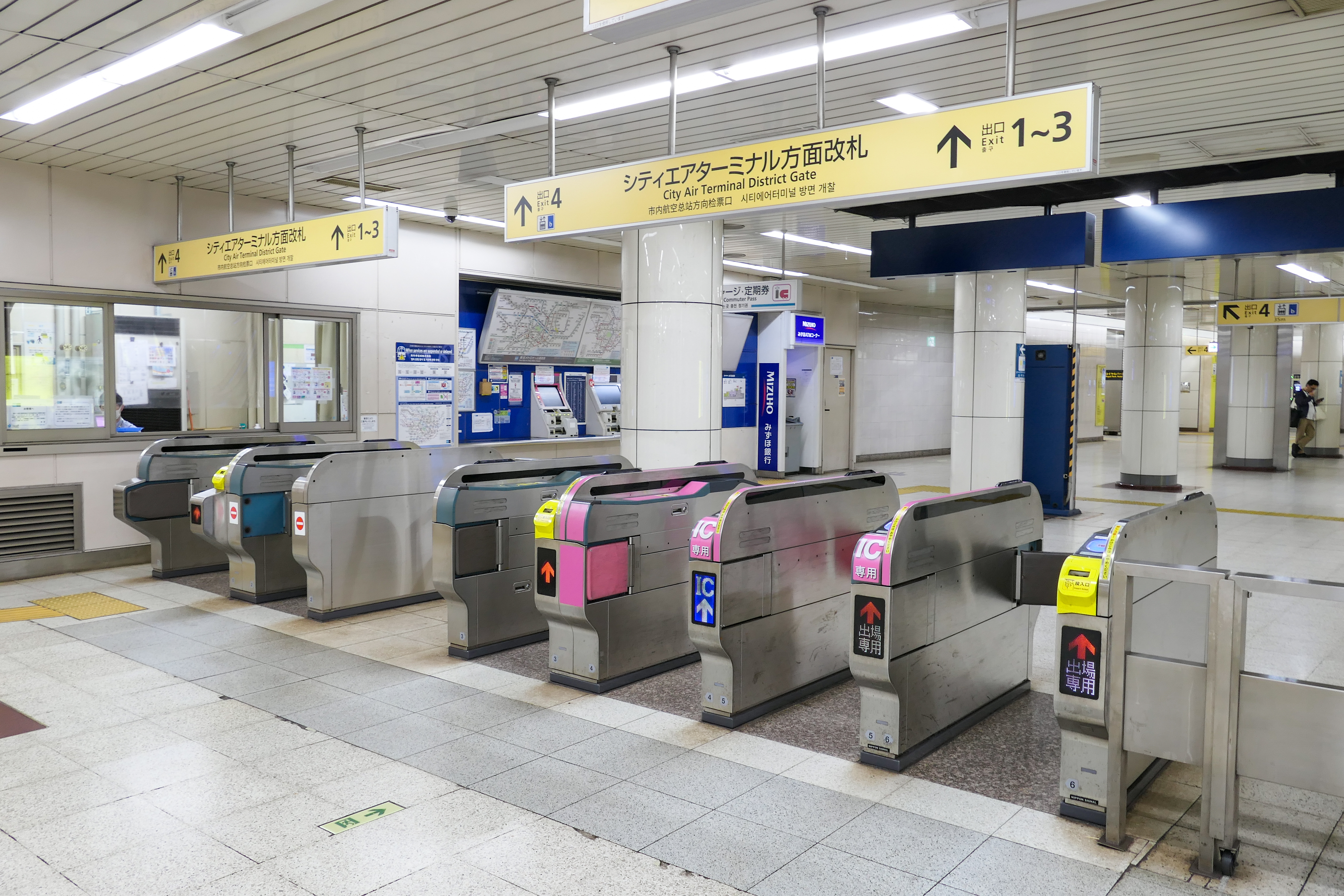
Ticket gate towards City Air Terminal in 2023

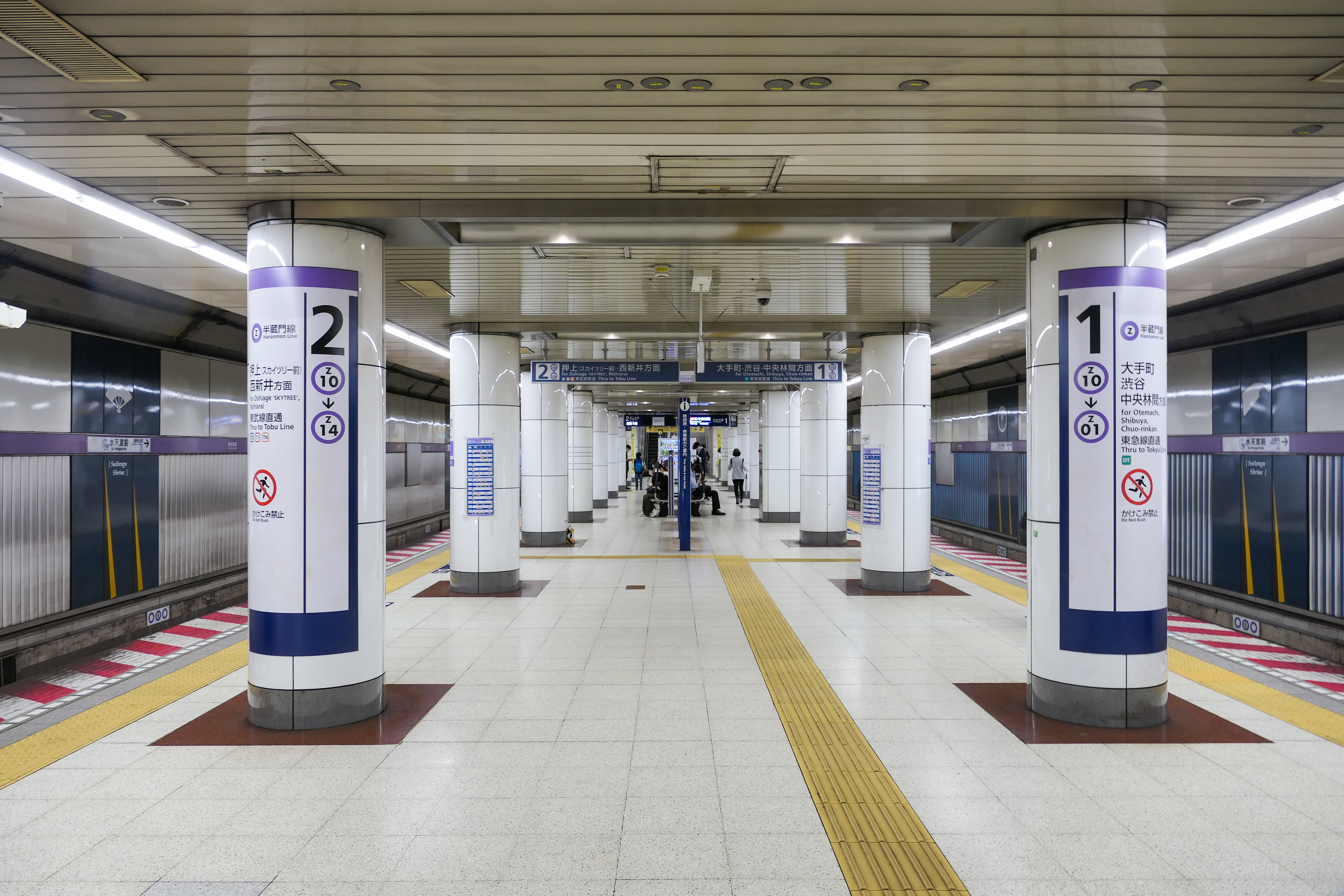
Platform in 2023

== History ==
Suitengūmae Station opened on 28 November 1990. It was the eastern terminus of the Hanzomon Line until 2003, when the line was extended to Oshiage Station.

The station facilities were inherited by Tokyo Metro after the privatization of the Teito Rapid Transit Authority (TRTA) in 2004.

== Surrounding area ==
- Kayabachō Station ( Hibiya Line and Tōzai Line (approximately 12 minutes' walk)
- Ningyōchō Station ( Hibiya Line and Asakusa Line) (approximately 6 minutes' walk)
