= Yashio, Saitama =

Yashio 八潮市
- City
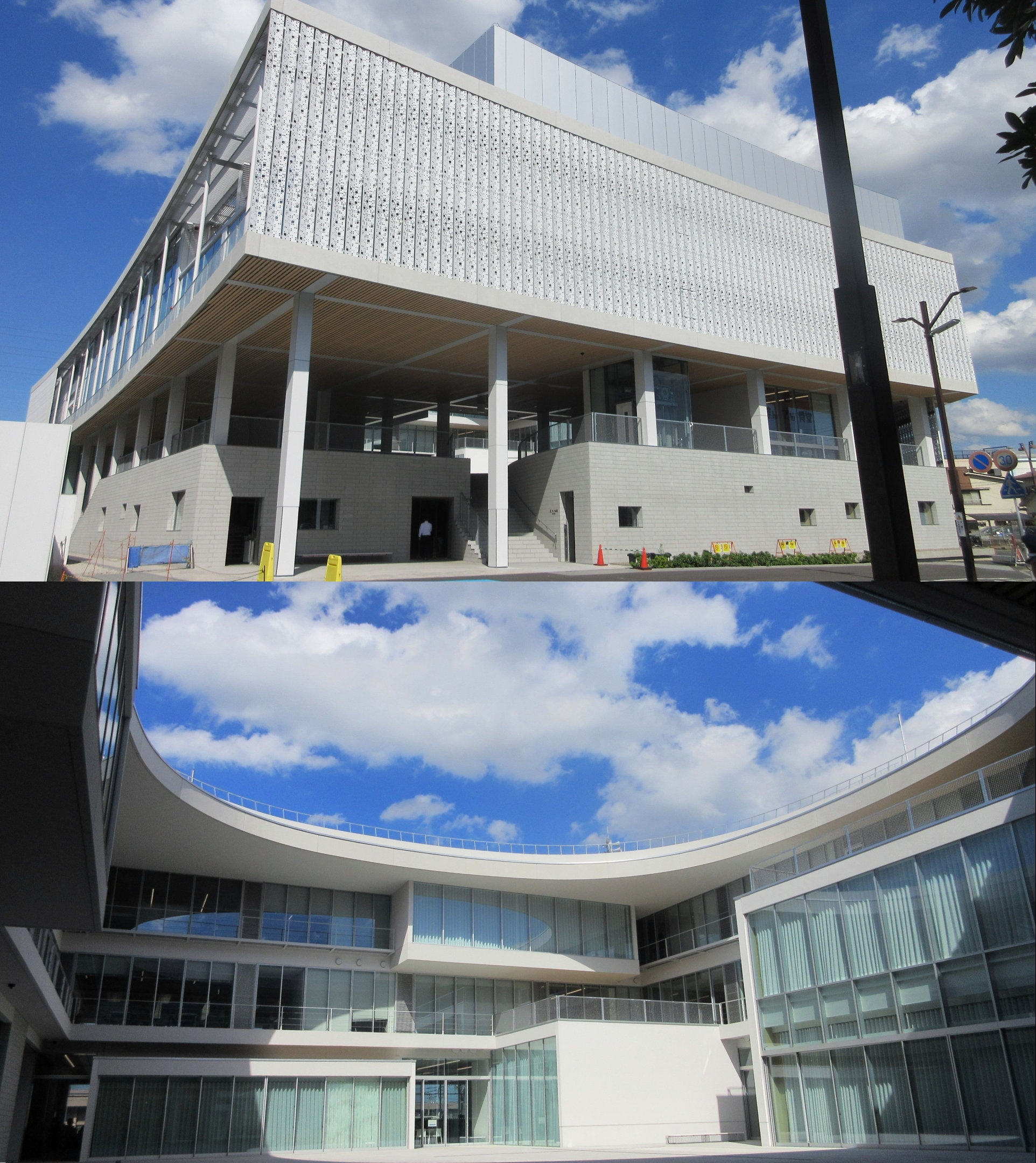
- Yashio City office opened in 2024

- Flag Seal

- Location of Yashio in Saitama Prefecture

- Location within Japan
- Coordinates: 35°49′21.1″N 139°50′21.2″E
- Country: Japan
- Region: Kantō
- Prefecture: Saitama

Area
  - Total: 18.02 km^{2} (6.96 sq mi)

Population (February 2021)
  - Total: 92,512
  - Density: 5,134/km^{2} (13,300/sq mi)
- Time zone: UTC+9 (Japan Standard Time)
- Tree: Ginkgo biloba
- Flower: Gardenia jasminoides
- Bird: White wagtail
- Phone number: 048-996-2111
- Address: 1-2-1 Chūō, Yashio-shi, Saitama 340-8588
- Website: Official website

Yashio (八潮市, Yashio-shi) is a city located in Saitama Prefecture, Japan. As of 1 January 2021, the city had an estimated population of 92,512 in 44,288 households and a population density of 5100 persons per km^{2}. The total area of the city is 18.02 square kilometres (6.96 sq mi).

== Geography ==
Located in far southeastern Saitama Prefecture at an elevation of only three meters above sea level, Yashio is on the central reaches of the Naka River, and is approximately 20 kilometers from downtown Tokyo.

=== Surrounding municipalities ===
- Saitama Prefecture
  - Misato
  - Sōka
- Tokyo Metropolis
  - Adachi
  - Katsushika

=== Climate ===
Yashio has a humid subtropical climate (Köppen Cfa) characterized by warm summers and cool winters with light to no snowfall. The average annual temperature in Yashio is 14.9 °C. The average annual rainfall is 1482 mm with September as the wettest month. The temperatures are highest on average in August, at around 26.5 °C, and lowest in January, at around 3.4 °C.

== Demographics ==
Per Japanese census data, the population of Yashio has increased rapidly over the past 60 years.

Historical population
Year	Pop.	±%
1960	13,307	—
1970	37,323	+180.5%
1980	62,734	+68.1%
1990	72,473	+15.5%
2000	74,954	+3.4%
2010	82,977	+10.7%
2020	93,363	+12.5%

== History ==
The area of modern Yashio was settled in the Kofun period and was part of Shimōsa Province from the Nara period. During the Edo period Tokugawa shogunate, the area was tenryō territory controlled directly by the shogunate. After the Meiji restoration, the area was transferred to the new Saitama Prefecture in 1871 and divided into villages with the creation of the modern municipalities system in 1889. The village of Yashio was created within Minamisaitama District, Saitama with the merger of the villages of Shiodome, Hachijō and Yahata on 28 September 1956. It was raised to town status on 1 October 1964 and to city status on 15 January 1972.

January 28, 2025: a sinkhole opened up near the Chuo 1-chome intersection, where Saitama Prefectural Route 54 Matsudo-Soka Line, Shiodome Street, and Josuijo Street ("Water Treatment Facility" Street) intersect. A truck drove into the sinkhole within seconds of it opening; the 74-year-old driver has not been rescued as of February 5. The cause of the sinkhole is believed to be massive leakage from a damaged sewer pipe buried under the prefectural road. The sewage of 12 municipalities flows through this sewer pipe on its way to a nearby sewage treatment facility. The Saitama Prefectural government has called on the 12 municipalities that use this sewer pipe to limit their sewage use, affecting a total of approximately 1.2 million people in the 12 cities and towns. Inability to stop the flow has led to enlargement of the sinkhole, greatly hindering rescue operations.

== Government ==
Yashio has a mayor-council form of government with a directly elected mayor and a unicameral city council of 21 members. Yashio contributes one member to the Saitama Prefectural Assembly. In terms of national politics, the city is part of Saitama 14th district of the lower house of the Diet of Japan.

== Economy ==
Due to this location, Yashio is primarily a distribution center, with a number of industrial parks. It is also bedroom community with part of its population commuting to the Tokyo metropolis for work.

== Education ==
Yashio has ten public elementary schools and five public middle schools operated by the city government, and two public high schools operated by the Saitama Prefectural Board of Education.

== Transportation ==
=== Railway ===
Metropolitan Intercity Railway Company - Tsukuba Express

- Yashio

=== Highway ===
- Shuto Expressway Misato Route
- Tokyo Gaikan Expressway
- National Route 4
- National Route 298

== Noted people from Yashio ==
- Kan Otake, professional baseball player
- Yohei Otake, professional soccer player
