= Tatsumi No. 1 Parking Area =

Rest area in Tokyo, Japan

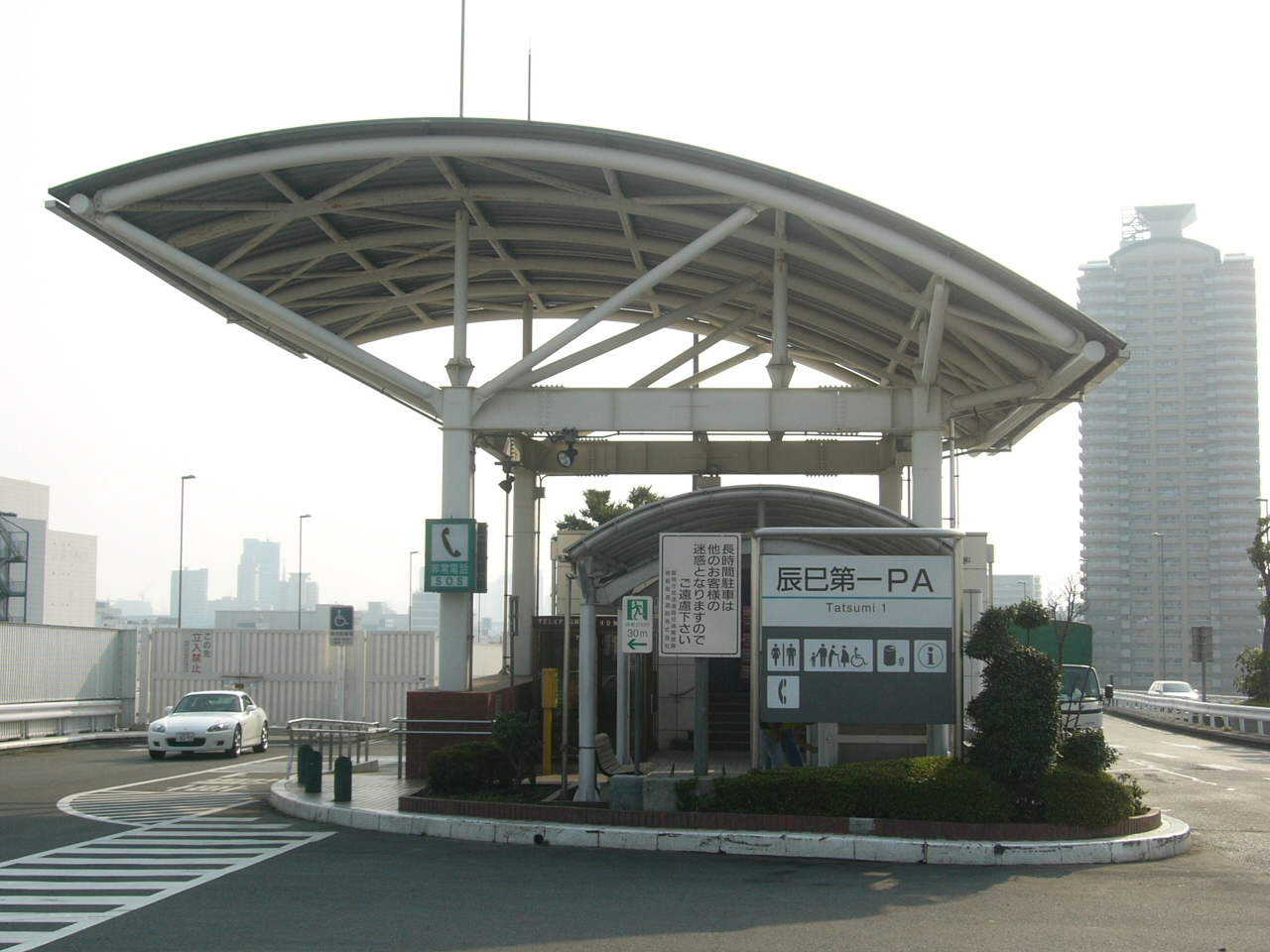

- Location within Special wards of Tokyo

Information
- Native name: 辰巳第一パーキングエリア
- Road: Fukugawa Route
- Location: Tatsumi, Kōtō, Tokyo, Japan
- Coordinates: 35°38′35.2″N 139°48′34″E

The Tatsumi No. 1 Parking Area (辰巳パーキングエリア, Tatsumi Daichi Pākingueria) is a rest area that is located on the Fukagawa Route of the Shuto Expressway in Tatsumi, Kōtō, Tokyo.

Located in the Tatsumi Junction, only vehicles heading from the Bayshore Route via Ariake Junction to the Fukagawa Route (Hakozaki area) can be used.

It is a place where car enthusiasts gather because it is a large parking area for the Shuto Expressway in the 23 wards, and the night view of skyscrapers and the pictures of their cars "shine". On the other hand, annoying acts such as long-term occupation, noise, and sudden acceleration called "Tatsumi Dash" have become problems. Fences that block the night view and speed bumps that make it difficult for illegally modified vehicles to enter and exit were installed. In January 2023, a convex step (speed table) was installed on the road surface at the exit of the parking area for the purpose of speed control, but a video of a vehicle passing at high speed using this step as a jump hill was posted on social media. It has been posted many times and has become a problem.
