= Kayabachō Station =

Metro station in Tokyo, Japan

Kayabacho Station 茅場町駅

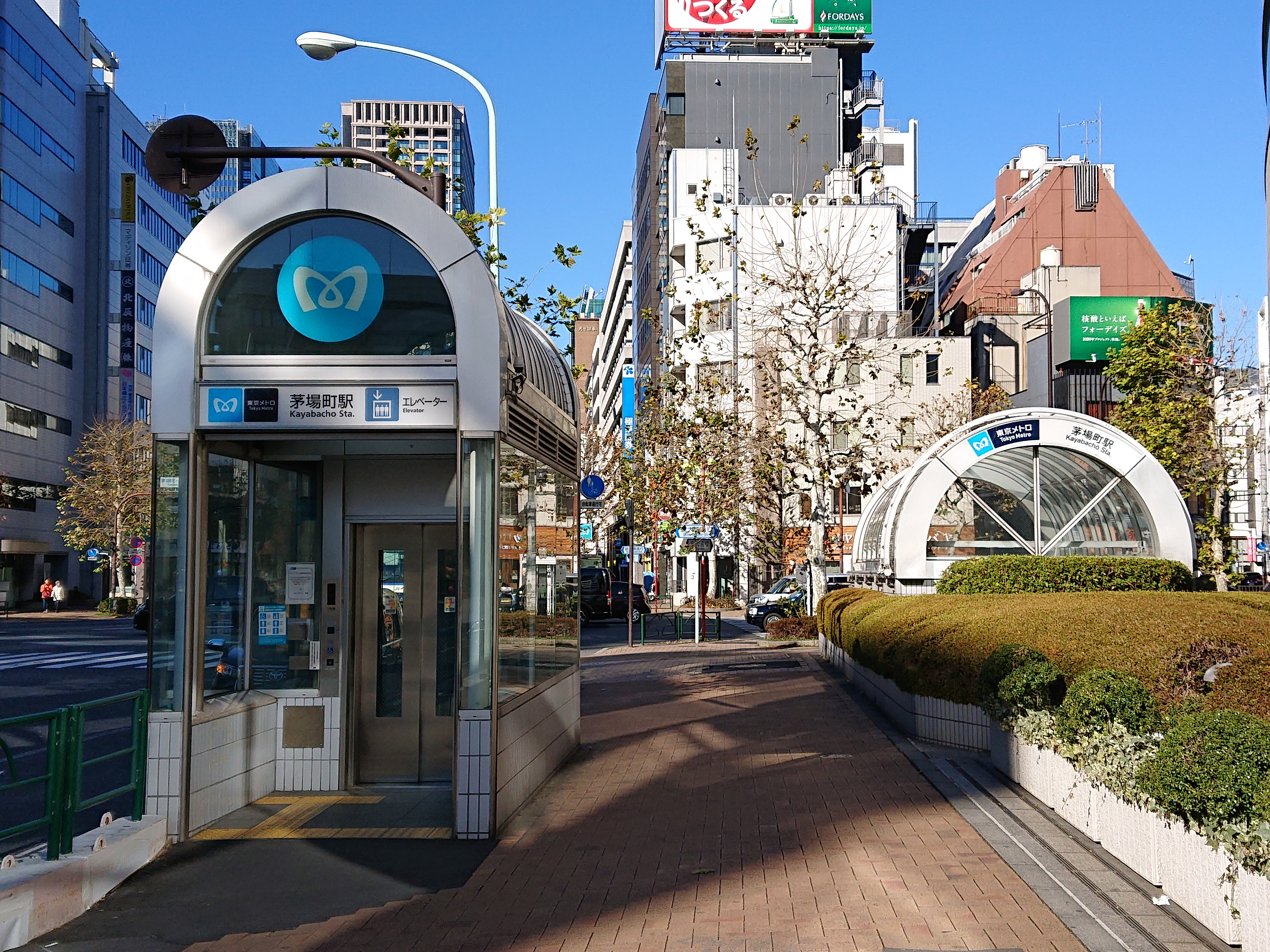
- Exit 4a and elevator, 2019

General information
- Location: 1-4-6 Nihonbashi-Kayabachō, Chūō-ku, Tokyo; Japan
- Coordinates: 35.679941°N 139.780158°E
- System: Tokyo subway
- Owner: Tokyo Metro Co., Ltd.
- Operator: Tokyo Metro
- Lines: Hibiya Line; Tōzai Line
- Platforms: 2 side platforms + 1 island platform
- Tracks: 4

Construction
- Structure type: Underground

Other information
- Station code: H13, T11

History
- Opened: 28 February 1963; 63 years ago

Services
Preceding station	Tokyo Metro	Following station
Ginza towards Ebisu	TH Liner	Akihabara towards Kuki
Hatchōbori towards Naka-meguro	Hibiya Line	Ningyōchō towards Kita-Senju
Nihombashi towards Nakano	Tōzai Line Rapid Commuter Rapid Local	Monzen-nakacho towards Nishi-Funabashi
Location
- Location within Tokyo Yamanote Loop Location within Tokyo wards area Location within Japan

Kayabacho Station (茅場町駅, Kayabachō-eki) is a subway station in the Nihonbashi neighbourhood of Chūō, Tokyo, Japan, operated by the Tokyo subway operator Tokyo Metro.

== Lines ==
Kayabacho Station is served by the Tokyo Metro Hibiya Line and the Tokyo Metro Tozai Line.

== Station layout ==
The Hibiya and Tozai lines cross perpendicularly at the station and so do their platforms. The Hibiya Line has two side platforms with southbound trains using track 1 and northbound trains using track 2. In contrast, the Tozai Line has a single island platform with tracks on either side; platform 3 serves eastbound trains whilst platform 4 serves westbound trains.

=== Platforms ===
1	Hibiya Line	for Ginza, Roppongi, and Naka-Meguro
2	Hibiya Line	for Ueno, Kita-Senju; Tobu Skytree Line for Tōbu-Dōbutsu-Kōen; Tobu Nikko Line for Minami-Kurihashi
3	Tōzai Line	for Tōyōchō, Nishi-Funabashi; Chuo-Sobu Line for Tsudanuma; Toyo Rapid Railway Line for Tōyō-Katsutadai
4	Tozai Line	for Otemachi, Kudanshita, Nakano; Chuo-Sobu Line for Mitaka

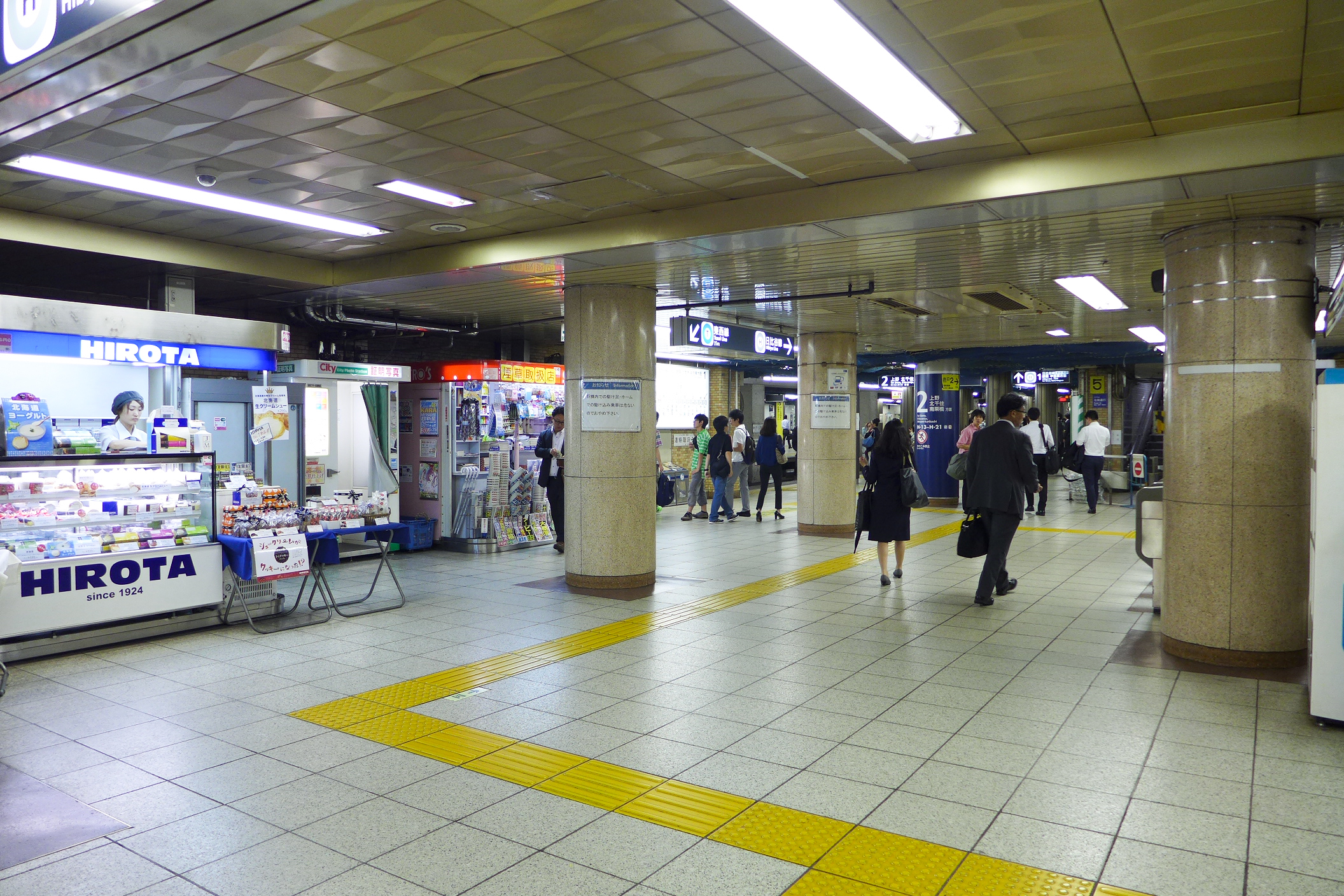
Concourse in 2015

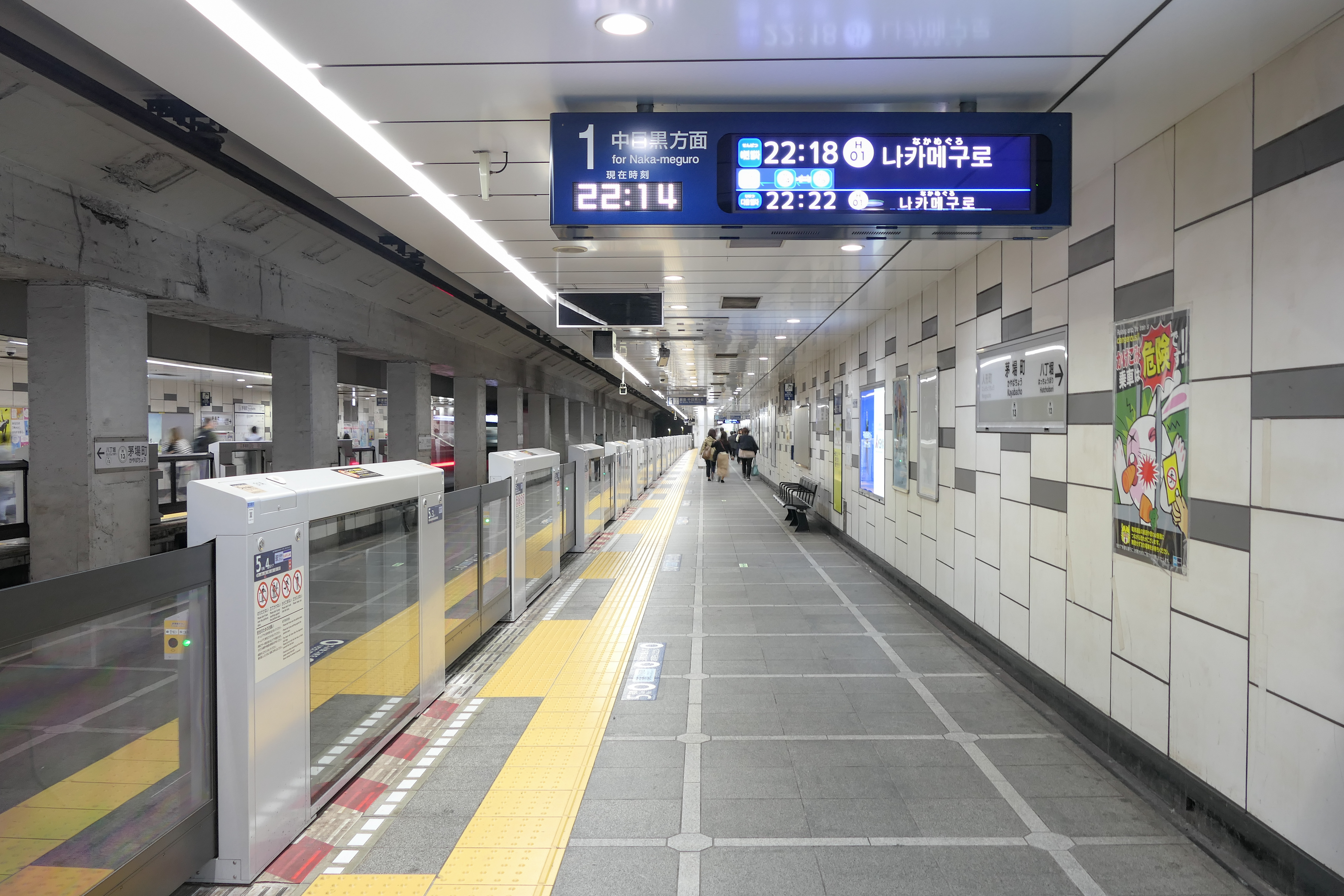
Hibiya Line platforms in November 2023

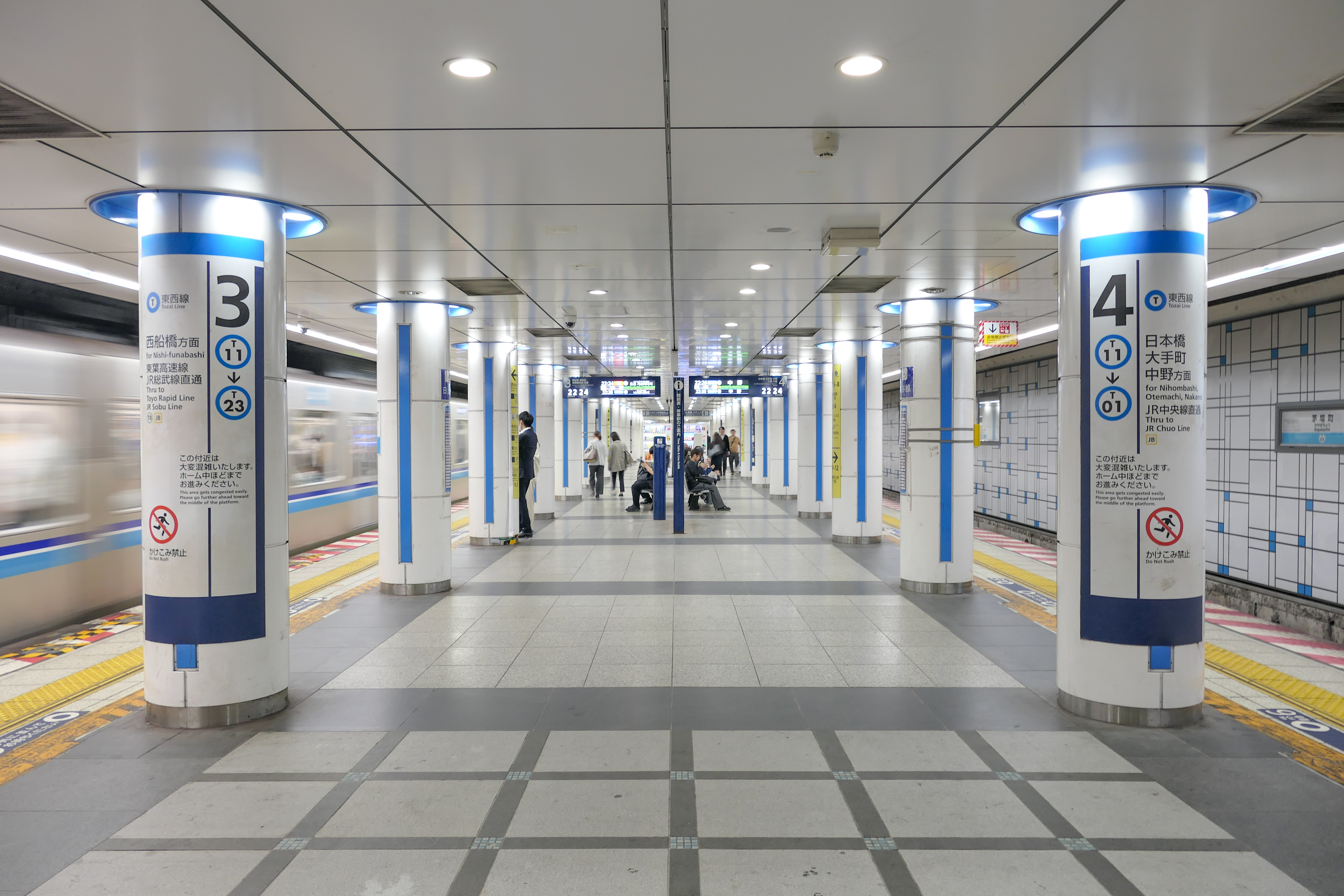
Tozai Line island platform in November 2023

== History ==
The station opened on February 28, 1963, as part of the Hibiya line, which then ran between Higashi-ginza and Kita-Koshigaya (on the Tōbu Isesaki Line). The Tōzai Line platforms opened on September 14, 1967.

The station facilities were inherited by Tokyo Metro after the privatization of the Teito Rapid Transit Authority (TRTA) in 2004.

TH Liner services on the Hibiya Line between Ebisu and Kuki commenced on 6 June 2020.

== Surrounding area ==
Kayabachō Station is located at an intersection of two major streets in southern Nihonbashi (specifically Nihonbashi-Kayabachō), a neighbourhood in Chūō Ward renowned for its financial history and commercial development. The Tokyo Stock Exchange is only a few blocks west in Nihonbashi-Kabutochō.

- Suitengūmae Station ( Hanzōmon Line) (approximately 10 minutes' walk)

== See also ==
- List of railway stations in Japan
