= Airport Transport Service =

Airport bus operator in Tokyo, Japan

Airport Transport Service 東京空港交通
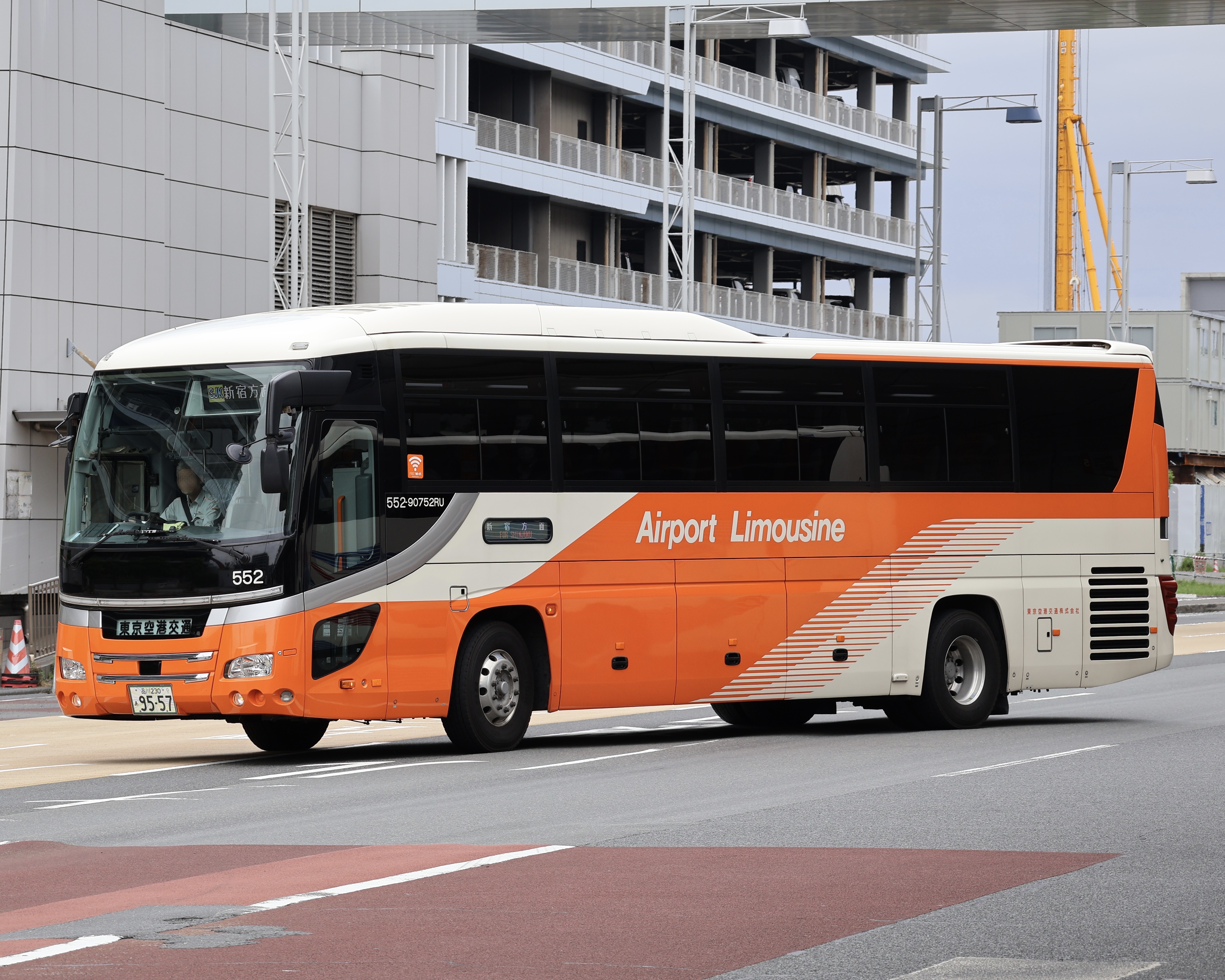
- Parent: Japan Airport Terminal: 22.64% Keisei Electric Railway: 22.56% Narita International Airport: 11.36% Tokyo City Air Terminal: 11.28%
- Headquarters: Chūō, Tokyo, Japan
- Service area: Japan
- Service type: On-airport and off-airport transfer, Tour bus
- Hubs: Tokyo City Air Terminal; Tokyo International Airport; Narita International Airport
- Fleet: 489
- Daily ridership: 8.9 million (FY 2016)
- Website: www.limousinebus.co.jp

Airport Transport Service Co., Ltd. (東京空港交通株式会社, Tōkyō Kūkō Kōtsū Kabushiki-gaisha) is an airport bus operator in the Greater Tokyo Area of Japan. It is based at the Tokyo City Air Terminal (TCAT) in Chūō, Tokyo.

ATS operates scheduled service to and from the area's two major airports, Haneda Airport and Narita International Airport, operating over 660 buses per day to Narita and over 550 to Haneda. The company also operates scheduled service between TCAT and Tokyo Big Sight, and late-night services from Tokyo to Chiba Prefecture.

The company also operates bus charter services and on-airport transfer bus services.
