= Ningyōchō Station =

Metro station in Tokyo, Japan

Coordinates: 35°41′10.7052″N 139°46′56.1972″E

Ningyocho Station 人形町駅

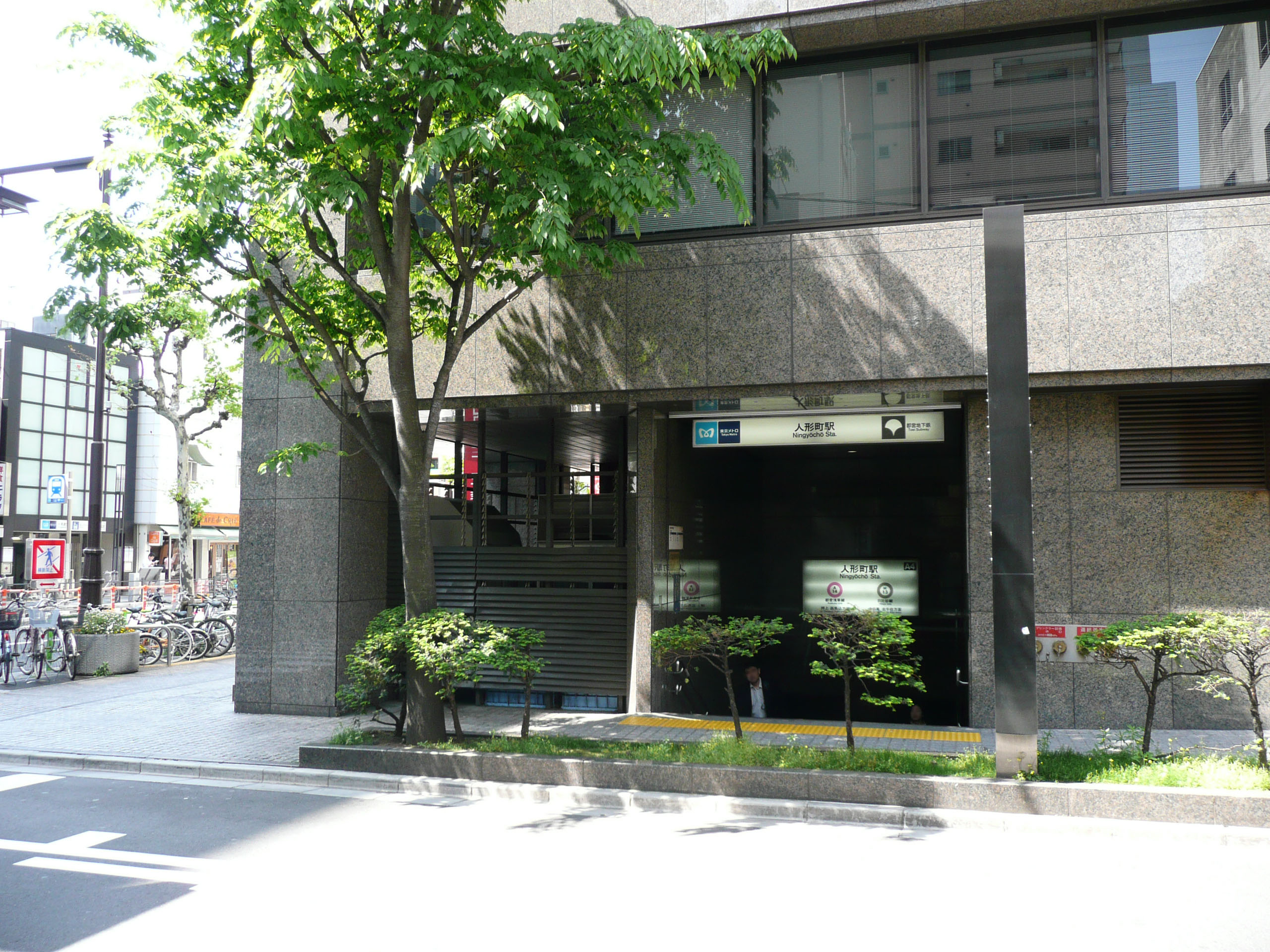
- Exit A4 in May 2010

General information
- Location: 2-6-5 (Hibiya Line); 3-7-13 (Asakusa Line) Nihonbashi-Ningyōchō, Chūō-ku, Tokyo; Japan
- Operator: Tokyo Metro; Toei Subway
- Lines: Hibiya Line; Asakusa Line
- Platforms: 2 side platforms (Hibiya Line), 1 island platform (Asakusa Line)
- Tracks: 4 (2 for each line)
- Connections: Suitengumae Station

Construction
- Structure type: Underground

Other information
- Station code: H-14 (Hibiya Line); A-14 (Asakusa Line)

History
- Opened: 31 May 1962; 64 years ago

Services
Preceding station	Tokyo Metro	Following station
Kayabachō towards Naka-meguro	Hibiya Line	Kodemmachō towards Kita-Senju
Preceding station	Toei Subway	Following station
Nihombashi towards Nishi-magome	Asakusa Line	Higashi-nihombashi towards Oshiage
Location
- Location within Tokyo Yamanote Loop Location within Tokyo wards area Location within Japan

Ningyocho Station (人形町駅, Ningyōchō-eki) is a subway station on the Hibiya Line (operated by Tokyo Metro) and the Asakusa Line (operated by the Tokyo Metropolitan Bureau of Transportation). It is located in the Ningyocho neighborhood of Nihonbashi, Chūō, Tokyo, Japan.

== Station layout ==
On the Hibiya Line, Ningyocho Station has two platforms separated by two tracks. Track 1 is for passengers traveling toward Ginza and Naka-meguro Stations. Track 2 serves those heading toward Ueno and Kita-senju Stations.

On the Asakusa Line, Ningyocho Station has an island platform between the two tracks. Track 3 carries trains to Nihombashi and Nishi-magome Stations. Trains stopping at Track 4 go toward Asakusa and Oshiage Station.

=== Platforms ===
1	Hibiya Line	for Ginza, Kasumigaseki, and Naka-meguro
2	Hibiya Line	for Ueno and Kita-senju; Tobu Skytree Line for Tobu-dobutsu-koen; Tobu Isesaki Line for Kuki; Tobu Nikko Line for Minami-kurihashi
3	Asakusa Line	for Nihombashi and Nishi-magome; Keikyū Main Line for Haneda Airport (International Terminal and Domestic Terminal) and Misakiguchi
4	Asakusa Line	for Oshiage; Keisei Main Line for Narita Airport (Terminal 2·3 and Terminal 1); Narita Sky Access Line for Narita Airport; Hokusō Line for Imba Nihon-idai; Shibayama Railway Line for Shibayama-Chiyoda

== History ==
Ningyocho Station was opened on May 31, 1962 by the Teito Rapid Transit Authority (TRTA). The Asakusa Line (then known as Toei Line 1) station opened on September 30, 1962.

The station facilities of the Hibiya Line were inherited by Tokyo Metro after the privatization of the TRTA in 2004.

== Surrounding area ==
The station serves the Ningyocho neighborhood. Nearby are the headquarters of Nisshinbo Industries, and Nikkan Kogyo Shimbun. Suitengumae Station on the Hanzōmon Line is about 500 m (1,600 ft) away from Ningyocho Station—approximately a 6-minute walk.
