= Tokagi =

Tokagi 稲荷木
- District
- Location within Chiba Prefecture Location within Japan
- Coordinates: 35°42′32.9″N 139°55′15.62″E
- Country: Japan
- Prefecture: Chiba
- City: Ichikawa

Population (September 30, 2017)
  - Total: 4,776
- Time zone: UTC+9 (JST)
- Postal code: 272-0024
- Area code: 047

Tokagi (稲荷木) is a district of Ichikawa, Chiba, Japan.
