= Japan National Route 14 =

National highway in Japan

National Route 14
- 国道14号
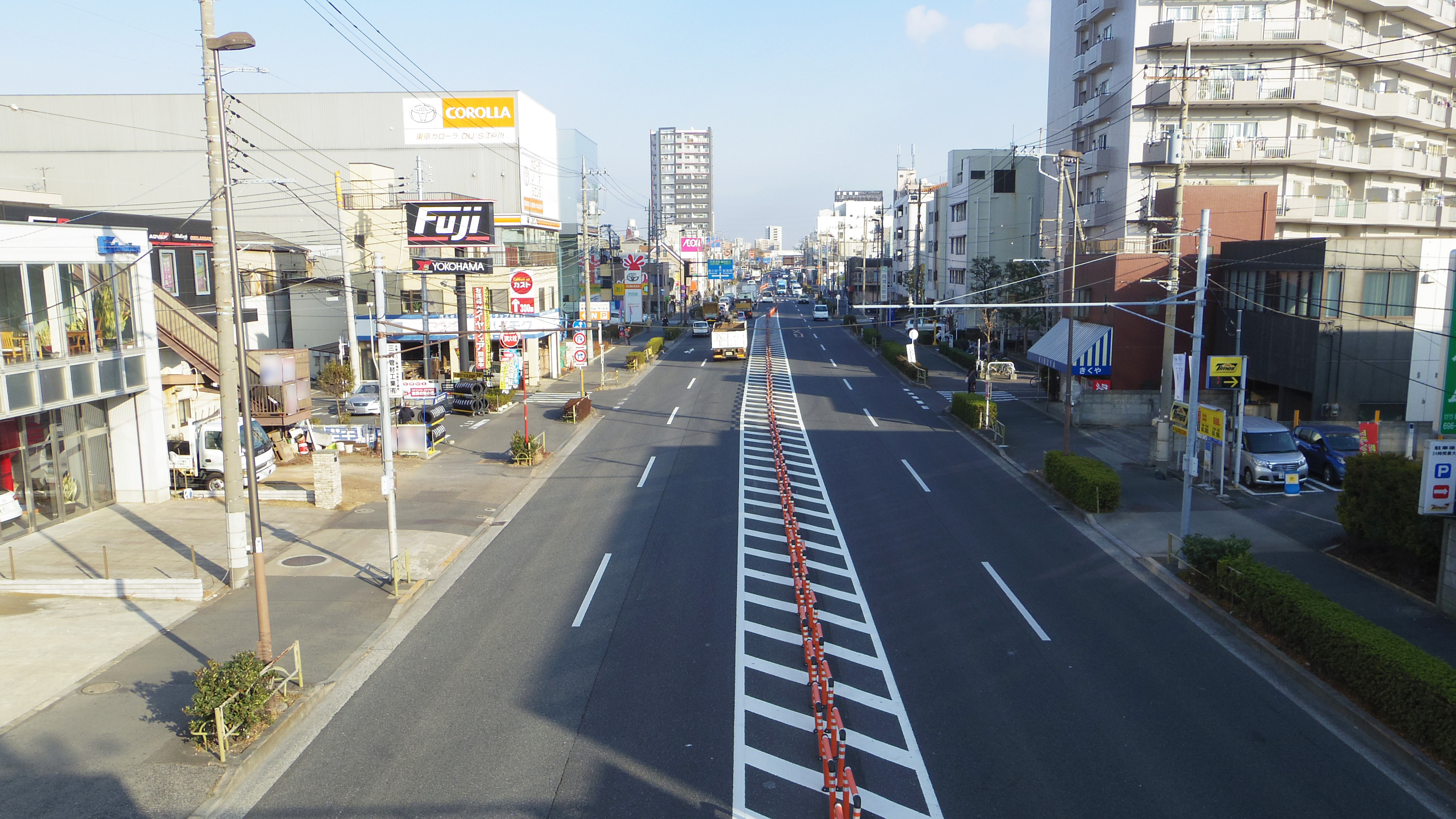

Route information
- Length: 44.1 km (27.4 mi)
- Existed: 4 December 1952–present

Major junctions
- West end: National Route 6 in Nihonbashi, Chūō, Tokyo
- National Route 296; Keiyō Road; National Route 357
- East end: National Route 51 / National Route 126 in Chūō-ku, Chiba

Location
- Country: Japan

Highway system
- National highways of Japan; Expressways of Japan
← National Route 13	→ National Route 15

National Route 14 (国道14号, Kokudō Jūyon-gō) is a national highway connecting Tokyo and Chiba in Japan.

== Route data ==
- Length: 44.1 km (27.4 mi)
- Origin: Nihonbashi, Chūō, Tokyo (originates at junction with Route 1, Route 4, Route 6, Route 15, Route 17 and Route 20)
- Terminus: Chiba (ends at junction with Routes 51 and 126)
- Major cities: Tokyo, Ichikawa, Chiba, Funabashi, Chiba, Narashino, Chiba and Chiba

=== Outline ===
The route is managed by East Nippon Expressway Company and Bureau of Tokyo Route. And the route is divided two managers at Ichinoe Bridge. Besides, the road, which is eastern of the Ichinoe Bridge, is managed by East Nippon Expressway Company, and the route is toll road which is named as Keiyō Road from there.

== History ==
- 4 December 1952 - First Class National Highway 14 (from Tokyo to Chiba)
- 1 April 1965 - General National Highway 14 (from Tokyo to Chiba)

== Municipalities passed through ==
- Tokyo
  - Chūō, Tokyo - Sumida, Tokyo - Kōtō - Edogawa, Tokyo
- Chiba Prefecture
  - Ichikawa, Chiba - Funabashi, Chiba - Narashino, Chiba - Chiba

== Intersects with ==
- Tokyo
  - Routes 1 and 15
  - Route 17
  - Route 4
  - Route 6
- Chiba Prefecture
  - Route 296
  - Route 357
  - Routes 51 and 126
