= Hakozakicho, Tokyo =

District in Chūō, Tokyo, Japan

Hakozakichō 箱崎町
- Neighborhood in Chūō
- Interactive map of Hakozakichō
- Country: Japan
- Prefecture: Tokyo
- Special ward: Chūō

Population (1 October 2020)
  - Total: 3,792
- Time zone: UTC+09:00
- ZIP code: 103-0015
- Telephone area code: 03

Hakozakichō (Japanese: 箱崎町) or more formally Nihonbashi Hokazakichō (Japanese: 日本橋箱崎町) is a neighborhood of Nihonbashi, Chuo-ku, Tokyo. It is the location of Tokyo City Air Terminal, and the headquarters of numerous companies, including Yoshinoya and IBM Japan.
