= Keiyō Road =

Road in Japan

Keiyō Road
- 京葉道路

Route information
- Length: 36.7 km (22.8 mi)
- Existed: 1960–present

Major junctions
- From: Shinozaki Interchange in Edogawa, Tokyo; Shuto Expressway Komatsugawa Route; National Route 14
- To: Soga Interchange in Chūō-ku, Chiba; Tateyama Expressway; National Route 16

Location
- Country: Japan
- Major cities: Ichikawa, Funabashi, Narashino

Highway system
- National highways of Japan; Expressways of Japan

The Keiyō Road (京葉道路, Keiyō Dōro) is a limited access Tokyo-Chiba toll road in Japan. It is owned and operated by East Nippon Expressway Company.

== Naming ==
Keiyō is a kanji acronym of two characters, each representing the two major urban areas connected by the route. The first character represents Tokyo (東京) and the second represents Chiba (千葉)

The route is officially designated as National Route 14 (Shinozaki Interchange to Anagawa Interchange) and a bypass for National Route 16 (Anagawa Interchange to the terminus). The section from the origin to Miyanogi Junction is classified as a road for motor vehicles only (自動車専用道路, Jidōsha Senyō Dōro), while the section from Miyanogi Junction to the terminus is classified as a national highway for motor vehicles only with national expressway concurrency (高速自動車国道に並行する一般国道自動車専用道路, Kōsoku Jidōsha Kokudō ni Heikōsuru Ippan Kokudō Jidōsha Senyō Dōro) as it is concurrent with the Higashi-Kantō Expressway Tateyama Route.

== Overview ==
The road is an important artery in the eastern part of the Tokyo urban area, carrying an average of 315,236 vehicles per day.

Starting in Edogawa Ward, Tokyo, the road crosses the Edo River to the east into Chiba Prefecture, passing through the cities of Ichikawa, Funabashi, and Narashino. In this area the road is roughly parallel to the Higashi-Kantō Expressway a few kilometers to the south. The road meets this expressway at Miyanogi Junction and then turns south, passing through the city of Chiba. At the south end of the city beyond Soga Interchange the Keiyō Road terminates, however the roadway continues as the Tateyama Expressway.

The speed limit is 60 km/h on the section designated as Route 14, and 80 km/h on the section designated as Route 16.

== Tolls ==
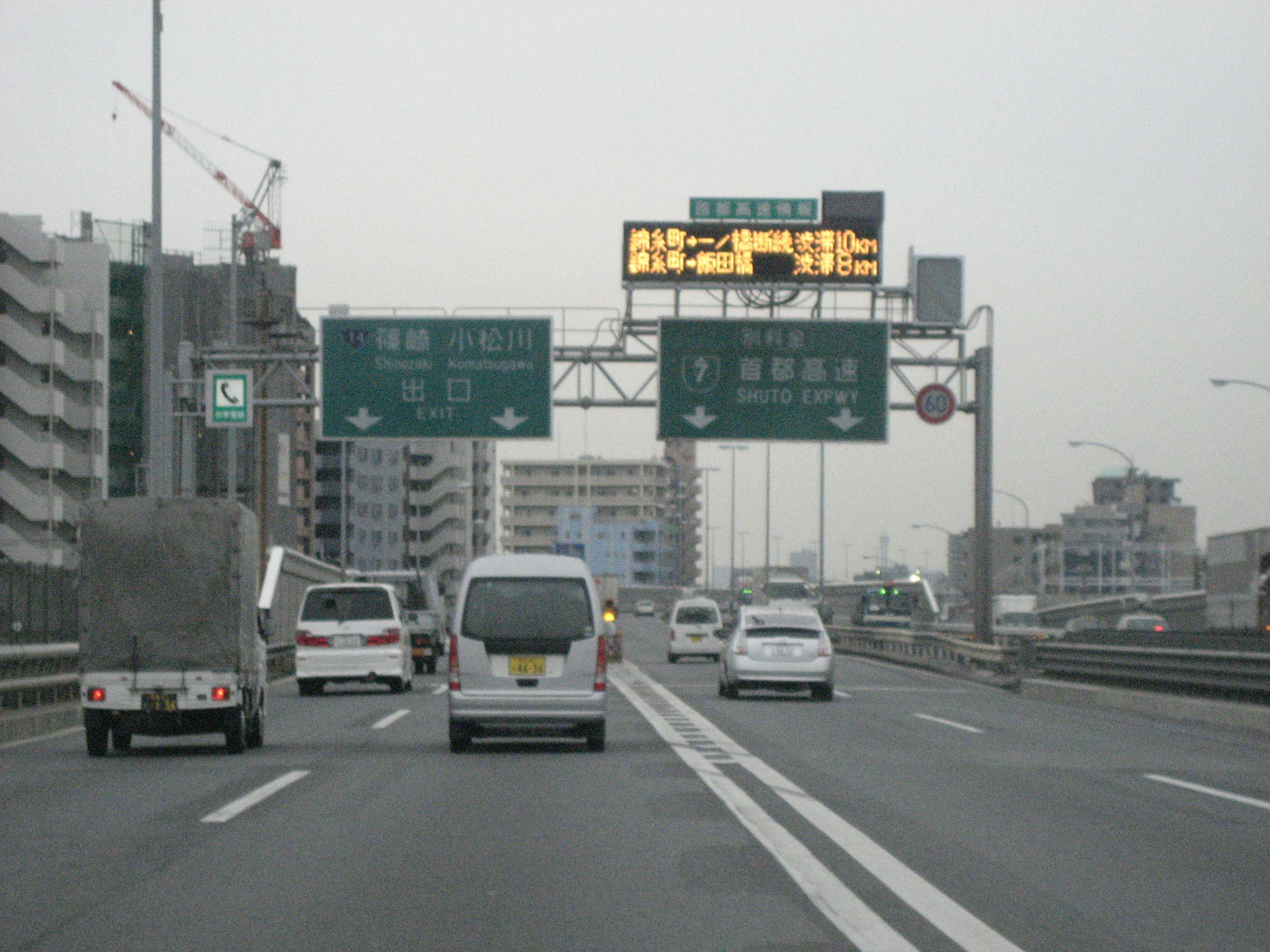
Shinozaki Interchange (bound for Tokyo)

For the purposes of toll assessment, the road is divided into six sections. Usage of one section incurs a toll of 100 yen for passenger cars, light trucks, and 2-wheeled vehicles, 150 yen for large trucks and buses, and 350 yen for oversized vehicles. Traversing the entire road therefore costs 600 yen for a passenger car.

The method of toll collection differs depending on the section of road used. From Shinozaki Interchange to Miyanogi Junction, toll booths at interchanges and toll gates on the main route are positioned so that a flat rate is charged at each station. From Miyanogi Junction to the terminus, tickets are issued upon entering the road which are used to calculate the toll at the exit point; this is the same system used on the Higashi-Kantō and Tateyama Expressways. Electronic Toll Collection (ETC) is accepted for payment, however commuter, off-peak, and late night discounts do not apply.

Due to the positioning of toll collection points, there are a few potential journeys that do not incur any toll at all. These include travelling only between Shinozaki Interchange and Ichikawa Interchange, travelling only between Takeishi Interchange and Makuhari Interchange, and also entering the road at Takeshi Interchange and exiting at Hanawa Interchange.

== List of interchanges and features ==
- IC - interchange, JCT - junction, PA - parking area, TN - tunnel, TB - toll gate

No.	Name	Connections	Dist. from Origin	Dist. from Terminus	Notes	Lanes	Location	
Through to Shuto Expressway Komatsugawa Route
1	Shinozaki IC	National Route 14	0.0	33.8	Tokyo-bound exit, Chiba-bound entrance only	Eight	Edogawa	Tokyo
<1-1>	Keiyō JCT	Tokyo Gaikan Expressway	↓	↑	Opens in 2015	Eight	Ichikawa	Chiba
2	Ichikawa IC	Pref. Route 6 (Ichikawa Urayasu Route)	4.1	29.7		Eight	Ichikawa	Chiba
2	Ichikawa IC	Pref. Route 6 (Ichikawa Urayasu Route)	4.1	29.7		Six	Ichikawa	Chiba
PA	Onitaka PA		4.7	29.1	Closed at March 31, 2012	Six	Ichikawa	Chiba
3	Baraki IC	Pref. Route 179 (Funabashi Gyōtoku Route)	6.6	27.2		Six	Ichikawa	Chiba
4	Funabashi IC	National Route 14	7.9	25.9	No Tokyo-bound exit	Six	Funabashi	Chiba
4	Funabashi IC	National Route 14	7.9	25.9	No Tokyo-bound exit	Four	Funabashi	Chiba
TB	Funabashi Toll Gate		↓	↑		Four	Funabashi	Chiba
5	Hanawa IC	National Route 296; Pref. Route 15 (Chiba Funabashi Kaihin Route)	11.5	22.3		Four	Funabashi	Chiba
5	Hanawa IC	National Route 296; Pref. Route 15 (Chiba Funabashi Kaihin Route)	11.5	22.3		Four	Narashino	Chiba
6	Makuhari IC	National Route 14	15.2	18.6		Four	Narashino	Chiba
6	Makuhari IC	National Route 14	15.2	18.6		Four	Hanamigawa-ku, Chiba	Chiba
PA	Makuhari PA		16.9	16.9		Four	Hanamigawa-ku, Chiba	Chiba
7	Takeishi IC	Pref. Route 57 (Chiba Kamagaya Matsudo Route)	17.8	16.0		Four	Hanamigawa-ku, Chiba	Chiba
(5)/TB	Miyanogi JCT/ Chiba-nishi Toll Gate	Higashi-Kantō Expressway	21.3	12.5	No access: Keiyō southbound → Higashi-Kantō westbound Higashi-Kantō eastbound → Keiyō northbound	Four	Inage-ku, Chiba	Chiba
(5)/TB	Miyanogi JCT/ Chiba-nishi Toll Gate	Higashi-Kantō Expressway	21.3	12.5	No access: Keiyō southbound → Higashi-Kantō westbound Higashi-Kantō eastbound → Keiyō northbound	Six	Inage-ku, Chiba	Chiba
8	Anagawa IC	National Route 16; National Route 126	23.7	10.1		Six	Inage-ku, Chiba	Chiba
8	Anagawa IC	National Route 16; National Route 126	23.7	10.1		Four	Inage-ku, Chiba	Chiba
8-1	Anagawa-naka IC	National Route 16	↓	↑	Soga-bound entrance only	Four	Inage-ku, Chiba	Chiba
8-2	Anagawa-higashi IC	National Route 16	↓	↑	Tokyo-bound exit only	Four	Wakaba-ku, Chiba	Chiba
9	Kaizuka IC	National Route 16; National Route 51	27.3	6.5	Soga-bound exit, Tokyo-bound entrance only	Four	Wakaba-ku, Chiba	Chiba
TN	Kaizuka Tunnel		↓	↑	Length - 190 m	Four	Wakaba-ku, Chiba	Chiba
10	Chiba-higashi JCT	Chiba-Tōgane Road	29.7	4.1		Four	Chūō-ku, Chiba	Chiba
11	Matsugaoka IC	National Route 16; Pref. Route 20 (Chiba Ōami Route)	31.0	2.8		Four	Chūō-ku, Chiba	Chiba
12	Soga IC	National Route 16	33.8	0.0	Tateyama-bound exit, Tokyo-bound entrance only	Four	Chūō-ku, Chiba	Chiba
Through to Tateyama Expressway
