= Jōban Expressway =

Road between Tokyo and Mito, Japan

Coordinates: 36.7522°N 140.6866°E

Jōban Expressway
- 常磐自動車道

Route information
- Length: 300.4 km (186.7 mi)
- Existed: 1981–present

Major junctions
- South end: Misato Junction; Shuto Expressway Misato Route; Tokyo Gaikan Expressway in Misato, Saitama
- North end: Watari Interchange; Sendai-Tōbu Road; Miyagi Prefecture Route 269 in Watari, Miyagi

Location
- Country: Japan
- Major cities: Kashiwa, Tsukuba, Tsuchiura, Mito, Hitachi, Iwaki, Natori, Sendai

Highway system
- National highways of Japan; Expressways of Japan

The Jōban Expressway (常磐自動車道, Jōban Jidōsha-dō), abbreviated Jōban-dō (常磐道), is a national expressway in Japan. It is owned and operated by East Nippon Expressway Company. It is signed E6 under the Ministry of Land, Infrastructure, Transport and Tourism's "2016 Proposal for Realization of Expressway Numbering."

== Route description ==
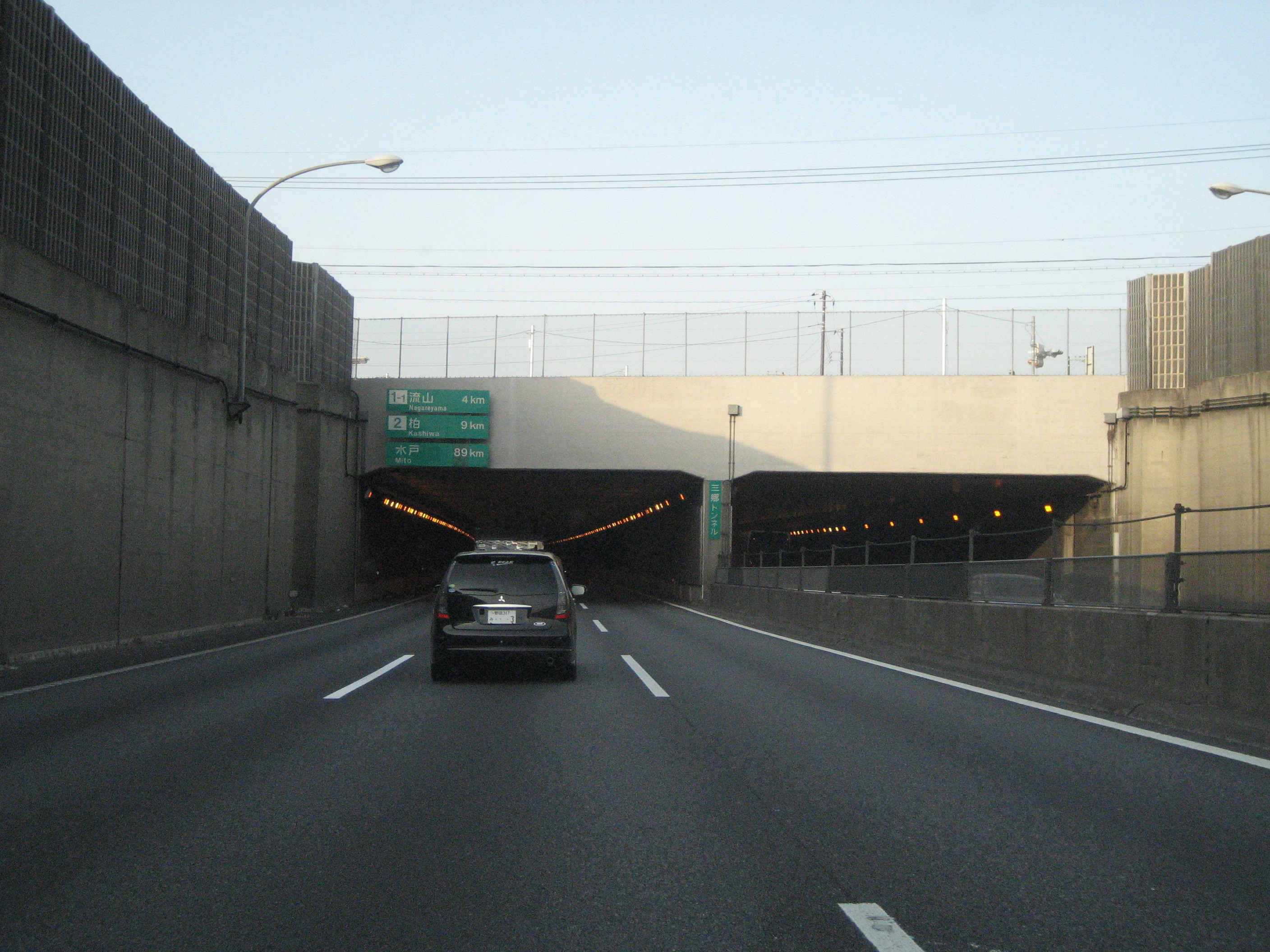
The Jōban Expressway near its southern terminus in Misato.

The expressway is an important route connecting the greater Tokyo area with Mito, the capital of Ibaraki Prefecture. Beyond Mito, the expressway follows a northerly route along the coast of the Pacific Ocean to the city of Iwaki in Fukushima Prefecture. Continuing north along the coast, the expressway enters the greater Sendai area. The expressway supplements the Tōhoku Expressway as an access route between Tokyo and the Tōhoku region.

For most of its length the expressway parallels National Route 6 and the Jōban Line of East Japan Railway Company.

The expressway gets within about six kilometers from the damaged Fukushima Daiichi Nuclear Power Plant. On a 14.3 km (8.9 mi) of the expressway opened on 1 March 2015, signs update drivers about what the radiation level is in the impacted area.

=== Naming ===
Jōban is a kanji acronym consisting of two characters. Each character represents a former province of Japan that is passed through by the route: Hitachi Province (常陸国) representing present-day Ibaraki Prefecture and Iwaki Province (磐城国) representing the eastern portion of present-day Fukushima Prefecture

The expressway carries the Jōban Expressway name from the origin at Misato Junction to Watari Interchange. From Watari Interchange to the expected terminus at Tomiya-kita Interchange, the Jōban Expressway name is currently an official designation only. The section from Watari Interchange to Sendaikō-kita Interchange is the Sendai-Tōbu Road, the section from Sendaikō-kita Interchange to Rifu Junction is the Sanriku Expressway (Senen Road), and the section from Rifu Junction to the terminus is the Sendai-Hokubu Road. It is unknown if the naming of these sections will be changed upon completion of the Jōban Expressway.

The expressway has a speed limit of 70 km/h between Iwaki-chūō Interchange and its northern terminus at Watari, a limit of 80 km/h between its southern terminus and Kashiwa Interchange and between Hitachiminami-Ōta and Iwaki-chūō interchanges, and a speed limit of 100 km/h on the remainder of the expressway.

== History ==
The first section of the expressway was opened in 1981. The section from Jōban-Tomioka Interchange to Watari Interchange is under construction, and extensions and upgrades to the existing Sendai road network are also planned.

=== Incidents and closures ===
During the 13 February 2021 Fukushima earthquake, landslides buried parts of the expressway, and embankments along it collapsed; however, no vehicles were trapped inside the debris. A 10-meter-long (33 ft) section of the expressway at another location was uplifted. The damages facilitated the closure of the expressway between Shinchi and Sōma interchanges in Fukushima Prefecture. In response, the East Nippon Expressway Company deployed heavy equipment to remove boulders and clear up debris along the expressway. By 17 February, the blockages along the expressway were cleared allowing traffic to resume along the route. Fences were also erected along the stricken sections of the expressway to prevent further rockslides.

== List of junctions and features ==
- PA – parking area, SA – service area, TB – toll gate

| Prefecture | Location | km | mi | Exit | Name | Destinations | Notes |
|---|---|---|---|---|---|---|---|
| Saitama | Misato | 0.0 | 0.0 | 1 | Misato | Tokyo Gaikan Expressway – Ōizumi, Matsudo; National Route 298 – Kan-etsu Expressway, Tōhoku Expressway, Sōka, Central Misato; Misato Route – to Central Circular Route, Ginza | Southern terminus of E6 and the Jōban Expressway; expressway continues as the Misato Route of the Shuto Expressway network; Tokyo Gaikan Expressway exit 80 |
| Saitama | Misato | 2.2– 2.4 | 1.4– 1.5 | Misato Tunnel | | | |
| Saitama | Misato | 4.2 | 2.6 | TB | Misato | | |
| Saitama | Misato | 4.2 | 2.6 | 1-1 | Misato-ryōkinjo | Saitama Prefecture Route 52 (Koshigaya Nagareyama Route) | Smart interchange; northbound entrance, southbound exit |
| Chiba–Saitama prefecture border | | 4.9 6.3 | 3.0 3.9 | Edogawa Bridge over the Edo River | | | |
| Chiba | Nagareyama | 6.1 | 3.8 | 1–2 | Nagareyama | Chiba Prefectuere Route 5 (Matsudo Noda Route) | |
| Chiba | Kashiwa | 10.8 | 6.7 | 2 | Kashiwa | National Route 16 | |
| Chiba–Ibaraki prefecture border | | 13.0 13.8 | 8.1 8.6 | Tonegawa Bridge over the Tone River | | | |
| Ibaraki | Moriya | 15.5 | 9.6 | SA | Moriya | | |
| Ibaraki | Tsukubamirai | 19.1 | 11.9 | 3 | Yawara | National Route 294 | |
| Ibaraki | Tsukubamirai | 20.4– 20.6 | 12.7– 12.8 | Kokaigawa Bridge over the Kokai River | | | |
| Ibaraki | Tsukuba | 30.3 | 18.8 | 4 | Yatabe | Ibaraki Prefecture Route 19 (Toride Tsukuba Route) | |
| Ibaraki | Tsukuba | 34.6 | 21.5 | 4-1 | Tsukuba | Ken-Ō Expressway | Ken-Ō Expressway exit 80 |
| Ibaraki | Tsukuba | 36.1 | 22.4 | PA | Yatabe-higashi | | |
| Ibaraki | Tsuchiura | 38.7 | 24.0 | 5 | Sakura-Tsuchiura | National Route 354 | |
| Ibaraki | Tsuchiura | 46.6 | 29.0 | 6 | Tsuchiura-kita | National Route 125 | |
| Ibaraki | Kasumigaura | 50.4 | 31.3 | PA | Chiyoda | | |
| Ibaraki | Kasumigaura | 54.7 | 34.0 | 7 | Chiyoda-Ishioka | National Route 6 | |
| Ibaraki | Kasumigaura–Ishioka border | 56.2 56.8 | 34.9 35.3 | Koisegawa Bridge over the Koise River | | | |
| Ibaraki | Ishioka | 60.9 | 37.8 | 7-1 | Ishioka-Omitama | National Route 355 | Smart interchange |
| Ibaraki | Omitama | 63.2 | 39.3 | PA | Minori | | |
| Ibaraki | Kasama | 69.1 | 42.9 | 8 | Iwama | Ibaraki Prefecture Route 43 (Ibaraki Iwama Route) | |
| Ibaraki | Kasama | 71.2– 71.4 | 44.2– 44.4 | Hinumagawa Bridge over the Hinuma River | | | |
| Ibaraki | Kasama | 72.8 | 45.2 | SA / 8-1 | Tomobe | Ibaraki Prefecture routes 16 (Ōarai Tomobe Route) / 52 (Ishioka Shirosato Route) | Smart interchange |
| Ibaraki | Kasama | 74.0 | 46.0 | 8-2 | Tomobe | Kita-Kantō Expressway | |
| Ibaraki | Mito | 82.0 | 51.0 | 9 | Mito | National Route 50 | |
| Ibaraki | Mito | 85.6 | 53.2 | PA | Tano | | |
| Ibaraki | Mito | 86.6– 87.0 | 53.8– 54.1 | Tano Overpass | | | |
| Ibaraki | Mito | 87.7 | 54.5 | 9-1 | Mito-kita | National Route 123, Ibaraki Prefecture routes 51 (Mito Motegi Route) / 63 (Mito Katsuta Nakaminato Route) | Smart interchange; northbound exit, southbound entrance |
| Ibaraki | Mito | 88.2– 88.7 | 54.8– 55.1 | Nakagawa Bridge over the Naka River | | | |
| Ibaraki | Naka | 93.8 | 58.3 | 10 | Naka | Ibaraki Prefecture Route 65 (Naka Inter Route) | |
| Ibaraki | Tōkai | 101.7 | 63.2 | PA / 10-1 | Tōkai | Ibaraki Prefecture Route 62 (Hitachinaka Port Yamagata Route) | Smart interchange |
| Ibaraki | Naka–Hitachi border | 102.8– 103.5 | 63.9– 64.3 | Kujigawa Bridge over the Kuji River | | | |
| Ibaraki | Hitachi | 105.3 | 65.4 | 11 | Hitachiminami-Ōta | National Route 6 / National Route 293 | |
| Ibaraki | Hitachiōta | 108.4– 110.8 | 67.4– 68.8 | Hitachi Tunnel | | | |
| Ibaraki | Hitachi | 110.8– 112.6 | 68.8– 70.0 | Ōkubo tunnels | | | |
| Ibaraki | Hitachi | 112.6– 113.9 | 70.0– 70.8 | Suwa tunnels | | | |
| Ibaraki | Hitachi | 114.4– 115.2 | 71.1– 71.6 | Narusawa Tunnel | | | |
| Ibaraki | Hitachi | 115.2– 117.0 | 71.6– 72.7 | Sukegawa Tunnel | | | |
| Ibaraki | Hitachi | 117.5 | 73.0 | PA / 11-1 | Hitachi-chūō | Hitachi Toll Road north | |
| Ibaraki | Hitachi | 118.1– 118.2 | 73.4– 73.4 | Sukegawa Tunnel | | | |
| Ibaraki | Hitachi | 118.2– 118.8 | 73.4– 73.8 | Daiōin Tunnel | | | |
| Ibaraki | Hitachi | 119.1– 121.0 | 74.0– 75.2 | Kurakake Tunnel | | | |
| Ibaraki | Hitachi | 122.7– 122.9 | 76.2– 76.4 | Ogitsu Tunnel | | | |
| Ibaraki | Hitachi | 124.3 | 77.2 | 12 | Hitachi-kita | National Route 6 Ibaraki Prefecture Route 10 (Hitachi Iwaki Route) | |
| Ibaraki | Hitachi | 126.2– 126.5 | 78.4– 78.6 | Jūō Tunnel | | | |
| Ibaraki | Takahagi | 135.2 | 84.0 | 13 | Takahagi | Ibaraki Prefecture Route 67 (Takahagi Inter Route) | |
| Ibaraki | Kitaibaraki | 136.6 | 84.9 | SA | Nakagō | | |
| Ibaraki | Kitaibaraki | 142.4 | 88.5 | 14 | Kitaibaraki | Ibaraki Prefecture Route 69 (Kitaibaraki Inter Route) | |
| Ibaraki | Kitaibaraki | 146.7– 148.1 | 91.2– 92.0 | Sekinami Tunnel | | | |
| Ibaraki | Kitaibaraki | 148.3– 148.5 | 92.1– 92.3 | Sekimoto Tunnel | | | |
| Ibaraki | Kitaibaraki | 150.3 | 93.4 | PA | Sekimoto | | |
| Fukushima | Iwaki | 154.5 | 96.0 | 15 | Iwaki-Nakoso | National Route 289 | |
| Fukushima | Iwaki | 161.0 | 100.0 | 15-1 | Iwaki-Onahama | Fukushima Prefecture Route 20 (Iwaki Kamimisaka Ono Route) | Scheduled to be in service on 2025.} |
| Fukushima | Iwaki | 167.1 | 103.8 | 16 | Iwaki-Yumoto | Fukushima Prefecture Route 14 (Iwaki Ishikawa Route) | |
| Fukushima | Iwaki | 169.4 | 105.3 | PA | Yunotake | | |
| Fukushima | Iwaki | 171.2 | 106.4 | 16-1 | Iwaki | Ban-etsu Expressway west | |
| Fukushima | Iwaki | 175.5 | 109.1 | 17 | Iwaki-chūō | National Route 49 | |
| Fukushima | Iwaki | 179.4– 179.8 | 111.5– 111.7 | Natsuigawa Bridge | | | |
| Fukushima | Iwaki | 185.7 | 115.4 | PA | Yotsukura | | |
| Fukushima | Iwaki | 188.3 | 117.0 | 18 | Iwaki-Yotsukura | Fukushima Prefecture Route 35 (Iwaki Namie Route) | |
| Fukushima | Iwaki | 194.3– 194.8 | 120.7– 121.0 | Ōhisa Tunnel | | | |
| Fukushima | Hirono | 202.1 | 125.6 | 19 | Hirono | Fukushima Prefecture Route 393 (Kamikitaba Shimokitaba Route) | |
| Fukushima | Naraha | 197.5– 198.9 | 122.7– 123.6 | Kidogawa Bridge | | | |
| Fukushima | Naraha | 207.4 | 128.9 | PA / 19-1 | Naraha | Fukushima Prefecture Route 35 (Iwaki Namie Route) | Smart interchange |
| Fukushima | Tomioka | 218.5 | 135.8 | 20 | Jōban-Tomioka | Fukushima Prefecture Route 36 (Ono Tomioka Route) | |
| Fukushima | Ōkuma | 222.5 | 138.3 | 20-1 | Ōkuma | Fukushima Prefecture Route 251 (Oragahama Nogami Route) | |
| Fukushima | Futaba | 227.9 | 141.6 | 20-2 | Jōban-Futaba | Fukushima Prefecture Route 256 (Ide Nagatsuka Route) | |
| Fukushima | Namie | 232.8 | 144.7 | 21 | Namie | National Route 114 / National Route 459 | |
| Fukushima | Minamisōma | 251.2 | 156.1 | 22 | Minami-Sōma | Fukushima Prefecture Route 12 (Haramachi Kawamata Route) | |
| Fukushima | Minamisōma | 257.7 | 160.1 | SA / 22-1 | Minami-Sōma Kashima | Fukushima Prefecture Route 34 (Sōma Namie Route) | Smart interchange; SIC only open between 06:00–22:00 |
| Fukushima | Sōma | 265.6 | 165.0 | 23 | Sōma | Tōhoku-Chūō Expressway north – Fukushima; National Route 115 – Central Sōma, Fukushima | |
| Fukushima | Shinchi | 274.1 | 170.3 | 24 | Shinchi | National Route 113 | |
| Miyagi | Yamamoto | 280.6 | 174.4 | 24-1 | Yamamoto-minami | Miyagi Prefecture Route 44 (Kakuda Yamamoto Route) | Smart interchange |
| Miyagi | Yamamoto | 288.9 | 179.5 | 25 | Yamamoto | National Route 6 | |
| Miyagi | Watari | 295.0 | 183.3 | PA / 25-1 | Torinoumi | Miyagi Prefecture Route 38 (Sōma Watari Route) via Watari SIC Line | Smart interchange |
| Miyagi | Watari | 300.4 | 186.7 | 1 | Watari | Miyagi Prefecture Route 269 (Watari Inter Route); Sendai-Tōbu Road north | Northern terminus of the Jōban Expressway; E6 continues north as the Sendai-Tōbu Road |
1.000 mi = 1.609 km; 1.000 km = 0.621 mi: Incomplete access; Route transition; Unopened
