= Yamate Tunnel =

Road tunnel in Tokyo, Japan

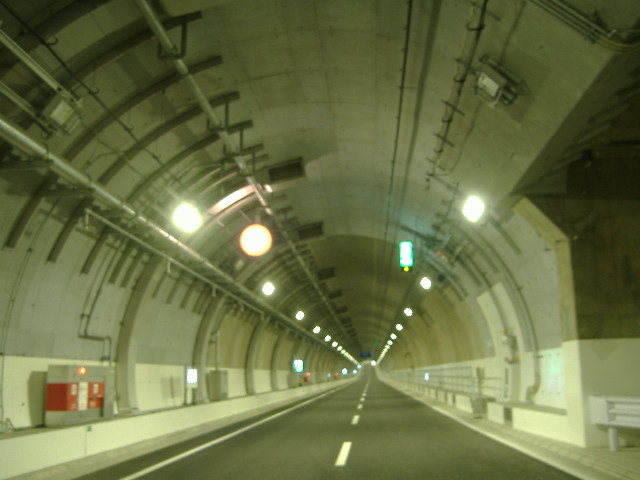
- The Nishi-ikebukuro Interchange
- Interactive map of Yamate Tunnel

Overview
- Location: Tokyo, Japan
- Status: In service
- Route: Central Circular Route

Operation
- Work began: 1992
- Opened: 22 December 2007 (initial segment); 7 March 2015 (entire tunnel)
- Traffic: automobile
- Character: expressway, twin-tube
- Toll: ¥530 to ¥930 (cars) ¥1,030 to ¥1,850 (trucks) (with electronic toll collection) ¥930-¥1,850 (cash)

Technical
- Length: 18.2 km (11.3 mi)
- No. of lanes: 2 per tube (4 total)
- Operating speed: 60 kilometers per hour (37 mph)

The Yamate Tunnel (山手トンネル, Yamate Tonneru) carries the Central Circular Route (C2) of the Shuto Expressway in Tokyo, Japan, from the Takamatsu on-ramp in Toshima to near the Ōi Junction in Shinagawa. It has a length of 18.2 kilometers (11.3 mi).

Lying 30 meters (98 ft) below the surface, about 70 percent of the tunnel was constructed by the tunnelling shield method. The roadway consists of two lanes in each direction. Nearly all of the tunnel lies beneath Yamate Street. On completion the Yamate Tunnel surpassed the Kan'etsu Tunnel on the Kan-Etsu Expressway, to become the longest road tunnel in Japan and the second longest road tunnel in the world. Most of the tunnel follows the route of Yamate Street (Tokyo Metropolitan Route 317).

== History ==
Plans for an expressway on the route were first drawn up around 1970, initially in the form of an elevated expressway over the Meguro River between Shibuya and Oimachi. The elevated expressway plan was shelved shortly after, following concerns about environmental issues and local resident protests, but re-emerged in the 1990s in the form of a tunnel plan. The final plan for the southern portion of the tunnel, approved in 2004, followed Yamate Street and the Meguro River, in order to minimize tunneling under private property.

Construction on the Yamate Tunnel began in 1992. The Takamatsu–Nishi Shinjuku segment opened on 22 December 2007. On the same date, an above-ground segment linking the tunnel to the Kumanochō Interchange in Itabashi and Toshima opened. The 9.4-kilometer (5.8 mi) section between Nishi Shinjuku and Ohashi opened on 28 March 2010. The last section linking Ohashi to the Bayshore Route opened on 7 March 2015.

== Facilities ==
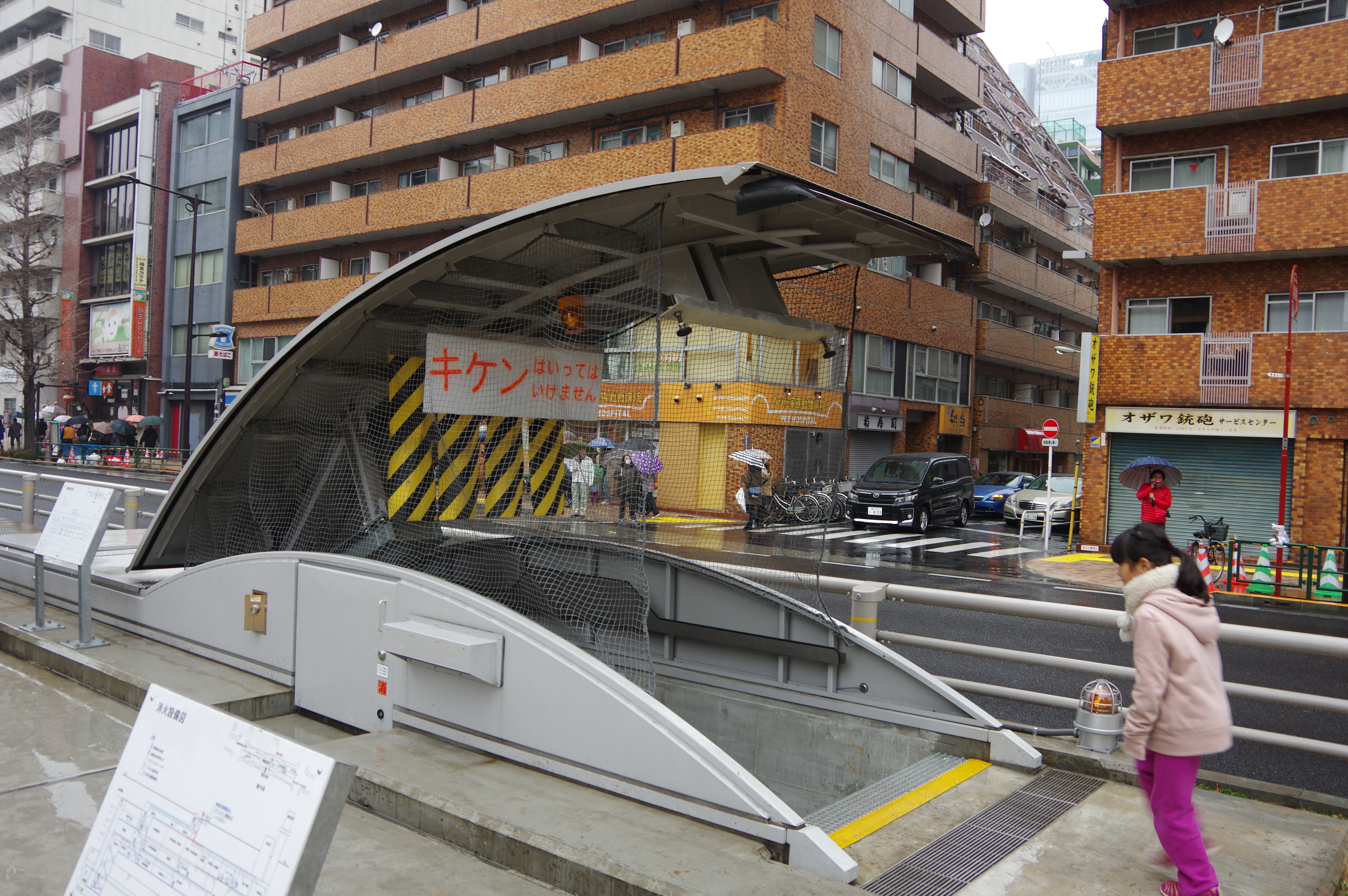
An opened emergency exit from the tunnel, located in the median of Yamate Street.

The tunnel has many operational and safety facilities. Among them are emergency telephones and cameras at 100-meter (330 ft) intervals. Fire-safety equipment includes infrared sensors, fire extinguishers, foam sprayers, and pushbutton alarms.

Emergency exits leading to a separate emergency path are located no more than 350 meters (1,150 ft) apart. Stairways lead up to Yamate Street. A duct running parallel to the roadway supplies fresh air and removes exhaust. Dust-collection systems are designed to remove 80 percent of particulates from the air.

The Ohashi Junction in Meguro, connecting the tunnel to the Shibuya Route, required construction of stacked elliptical ramps 400 meters (1,300 ft) in circumference and 175 meters (574 ft) in diameter, similar in size to the National Stadium track. For soundproofing reasons, the junction was encased in over 120,000 cubic meters (160,000 cu yd) of concrete. The structure was used as the centerpiece of an urban planning project that includes the Meguro Sky Garden park and several high-rise condominium towers.

== Ramps and junctions ==
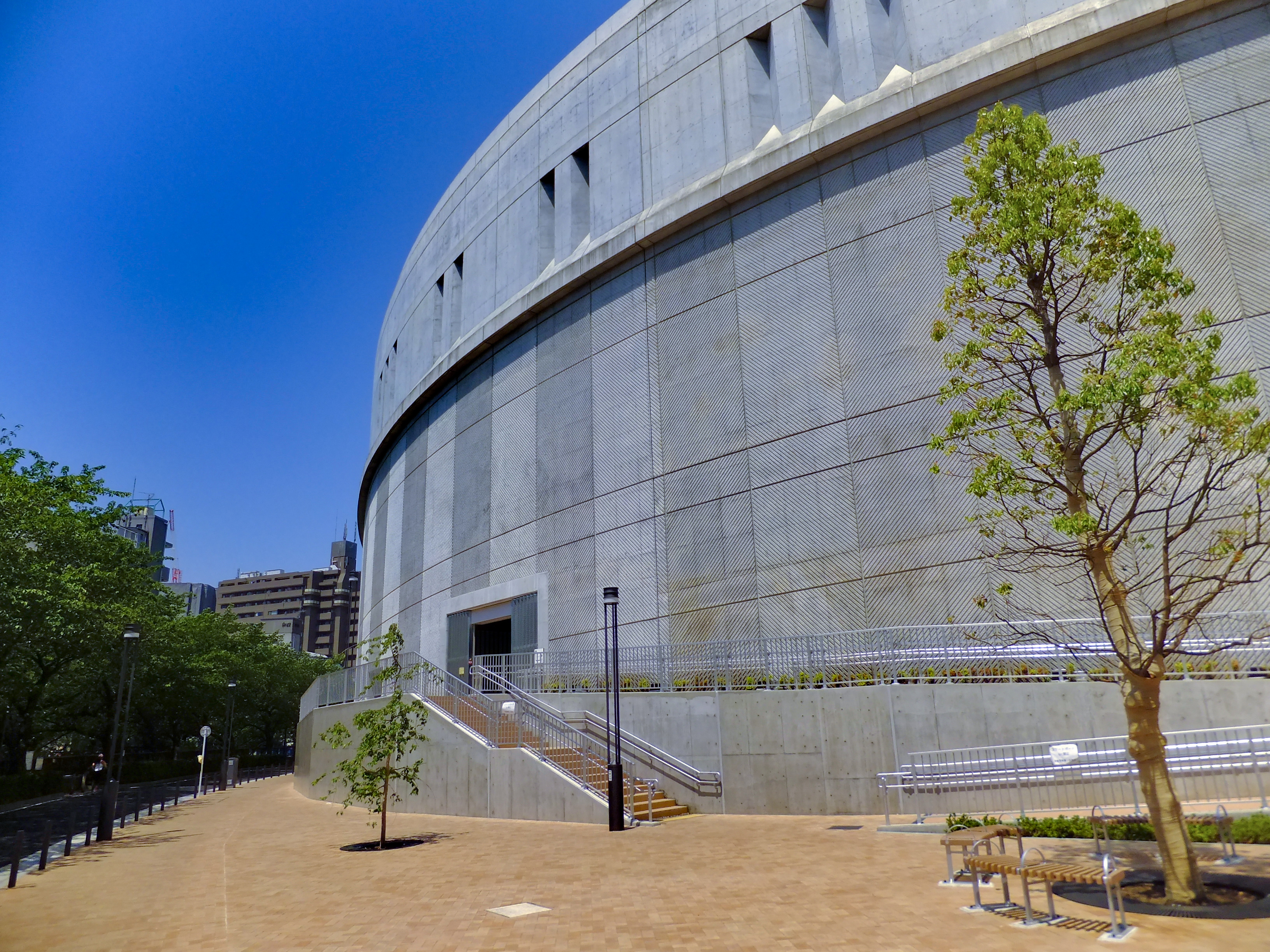
The exterior of Ohashi Junction, the 71-meter (233 ft)-tall corkscrew-shaped junction connecting the tunnel to the Shibuya Route.

Location	km	mi	Exit	Name	Destinations	Notes
Shinagawa	0.0	0.0	—	Ōi	Bayshore Route – Urayasu, Shin-Kiba, Haneda Airport	Counterclockwise terminus of Central Circular Route
Shinagawa	0.6	0.37	South end of Yamate Tunnel			
Shinagawa	1.2	0.75	C18	Ōi Minami	National Route 357 (Tokyo Bay Road)	Northbound exit and southbound entrance; smart interchange
Shinagawa	6.0	3.7	C20	Gotanda	Tokyo Metropolitan Route 317 (Yamate-dori)	Southbound exit and northbound entrance
Meguro	9.4	5.8	–	Ohashi	Shibuya Route west to Tōmei Expressway – Yoga Shibuya Route east – Tanimachi	
Shibuya	11.4	7.1	C22	Tomigaya	Tokyo Metropolitan Route 317 (Yamate-dori)	Southbound exit and northbound entrance; smart interchange
Shibuya	11.8	7.3	C23	Hatsudai-minami	Tokyo Metropolitan Route 317 (Yamate-dori)	Northbound exit and southbound entrance; smart interchange
Shinjuku	13.0	8.1	–	Nishi-Shinjuku	Shinjuku Route west to Chuo Expressway – Takaido Shinjuku Route east – Miyakezaka	
Nakano	14.7	9.1	C24	Nakano-Chojabashi	National Route 20 (Kōshū Kaidō)	Southbound exit and northbound entrance; to Tokyo Metropolitan Government Building
Toshima	18.5	11.5	C25	Nishi-Ikebukuro	Mejiro-dori Tokyo Metropolitan Route 441 (Kanamecho-dori)	Southbound exit and northbound entrance
Toshima	18.8	11.7	North end of Yamate Tunnel			
Toshima	20.1	12.5	C26	Nishi-Ikebukuro	Mejiro-dori Tokyo Metropolitan Route 441 (Kanamecho-dori)	Northbound exit and southbound entrance
Toshima	20.1	12.5	Expressway continues as Central Circular Route			
1.000 mi = 1.609 km; 1.000 km = 0.621 mi: Closed/former; Incomplete access

== Other underground viaducts ==
The Yamate Tunnel passes above the Yūrakuchō and Ōedo subway lines. It crosses below the Tōzai and Marunouchi subway lines, as well as the Keiō and Keiō New Lines and the Tōkyū Den-en-toshi Line. The tunnel runs parallel to the Ōedo Line, along a segment between Nakai and Nishi Shinjuku Gochome Stations. Nakai and Nakano Sakaue Stations, lying beneath the Yamate Tunnel, have escalators that pass between Yamate's two tunnels.

== See also ==
- Gotthard Base Tunnel
- Sapaesan Tunnel
