= Ōhashi, Meguro, Tokyo =

Neighborhood in Meguro, Tokyo, Japan

Coordinates: 35.652083°N 139.687417°E

Ōhashi 大橋
- Neighborhood in Meguro
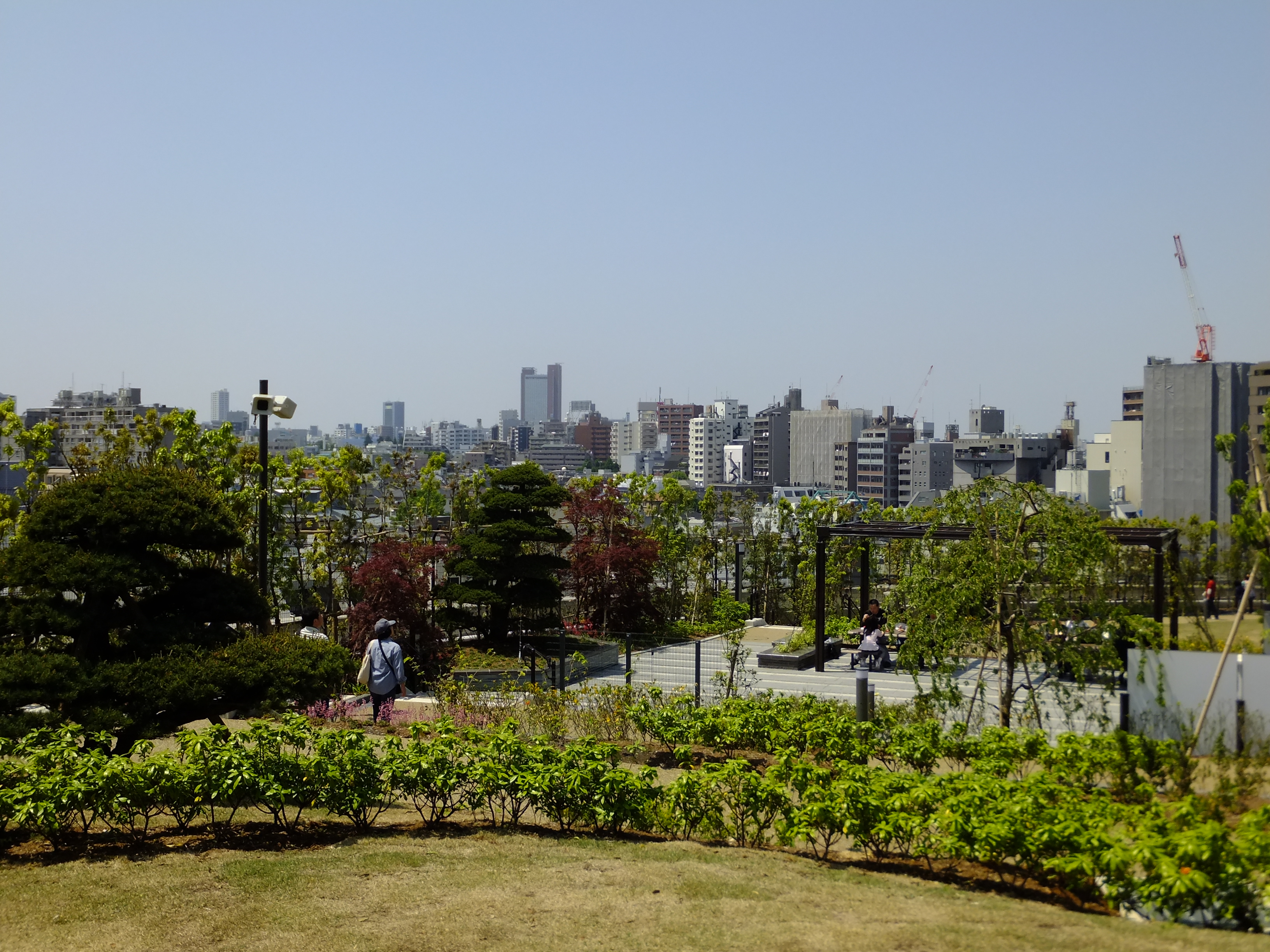
- Meguro Sky Garden
- Interactive map of Ōhashi
- Country: Japan
- Prefecture: Tokyo
- Special ward: Meguro

Population (1 October 2020)
  - Total: 7,181
- Time zone: UTC+09:00
- ZIP code: 153-0044
- Telephone area code: 03

Ōhashi (大橋) is a neighborhood located in the northern area of Meguro, Tokyo, Japan. Consisting of two chōme. As of October 1, 2020, the neighborhood has a population of 7,181.

== Geography ==
It borders with Komaba in the north, Aobadai in the east, and Ikejiri, Setagaya in the west.

== History ==
Ōhashi was named after a bridge with the same name on the Meguro River. Formerly, the neighborhood was part of Komaba in the Village of Kamimeguro, District of Ebara. When address modernization was implemented in Japan, the neighborhood was planned to be named Aobadai 5-chōme and 6-chōme, but the residents hoped that it would be an independent neighborhood and thus it was named Ōhashi.

Prior to the end of the Second World War, land in the north of Ohashi, was used as the location of cavalry and logistics training facilities for the Imperial Japanese Army. High school sports facilities, public housing and the headquarters of the third division of the Tokyo Metropolitan Police now occupy this site.

== Landmarks ==
- The northern section of the Meguro River, a popular venue for cherry blossom viewing, borders Ohashi.
- The Meguro Sky Garden, a 400meter linear roof garden constructed 35 meters above street level covering the junction of two major expressways, opened in Ohashi in 2013. The road junction redevelopment also includes high rise residential housing, retail, a local government branch office, a library, community meeting rooms and outdoor sports facilities.
- Toho University Ohashi Hospital

== Transportation ==
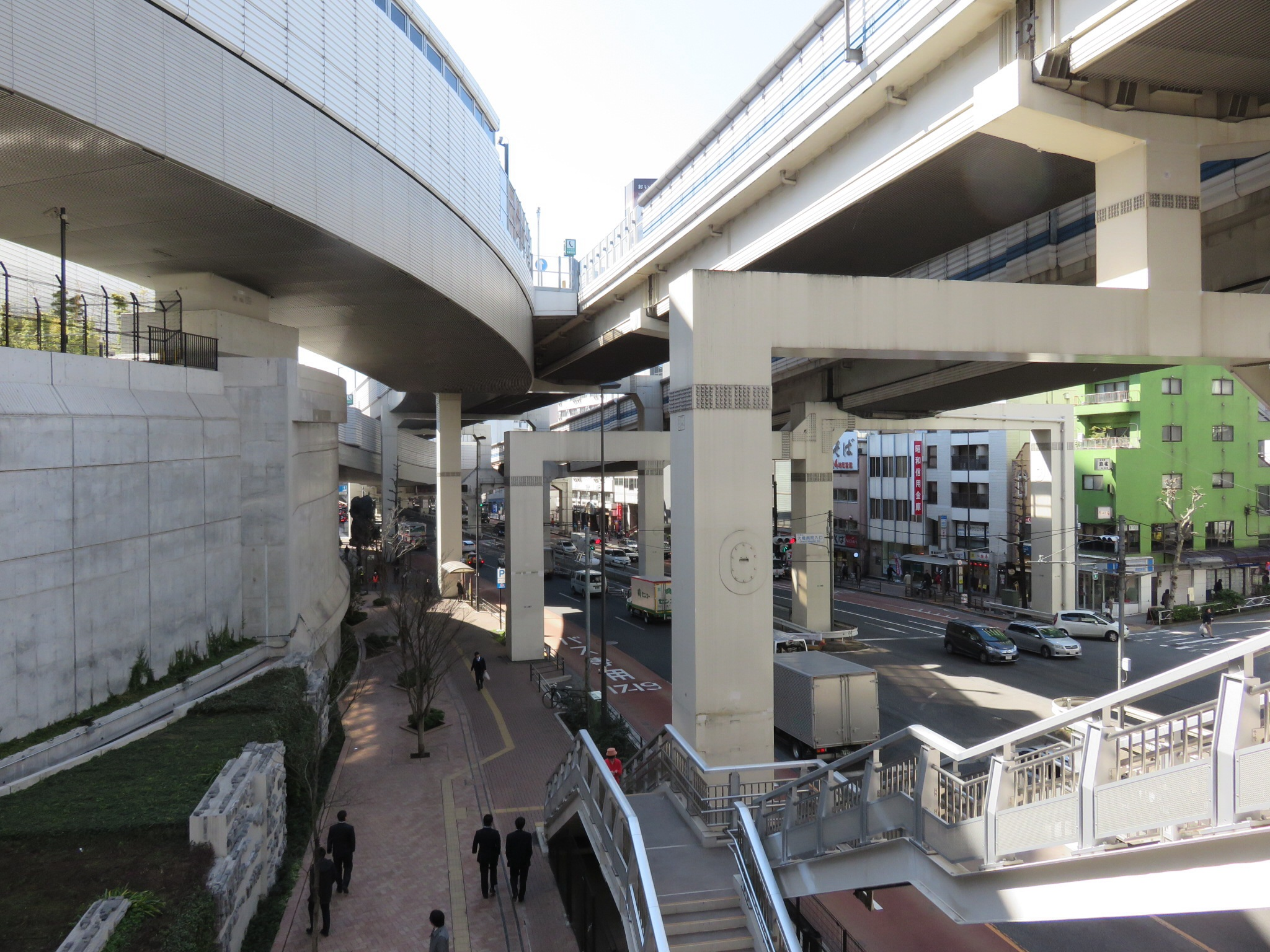
Ohashi, Meguro, Route 246

=== Rail ===
Commuter rail service is provided by Ikejiri-Ohashi Station on the Tokyu Den-en-toshi Line located in adjacent Setagaya.

=== Highways ===
Elevated road infrastructure for Route 3 (Shuto Expressway) and at ground level, Route 246, dominates the streetscene of central Ohashi.

== Education ==
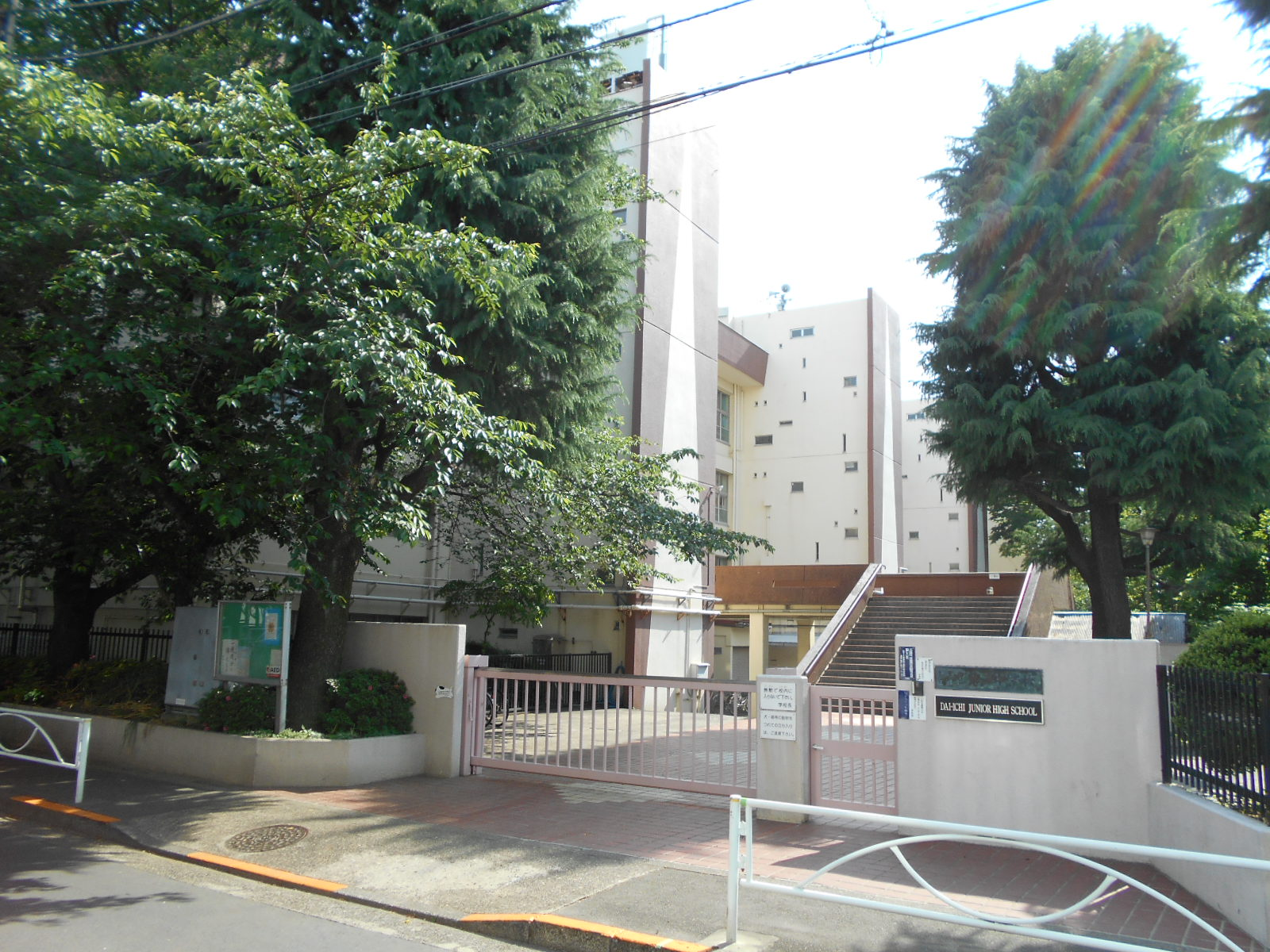
No. 1 (Dai-Ichi) Junior High School (第一中学校)

Meguro City Board of Education operates public elementary and junior high schools.

Ohashi 1-chōme and parts of 2-chōme are zoned to Sugekari Elementary School (菅刈小学校). Other parts of 2-chōme are zoned to Komaba Elementary School (駒場小学校), and 2-chome 24-ban is zoned to Higashiyama Elementary School (東山小学校). Most of Ohashi is zoned to No. 1 (Dai-Ichi) Junior High School (第一中学校). The portion zoned to Higashiyama (2-chome 24-ban) instead feeds into Higashiyama Junior High School (東山中学校).

Schools in Ohashi:

- No. 1 (Dai-Ichi) Junior High School
