= Quadrant roadway intersection =

Type of roadway junction with one main intersection and two secondary intersections

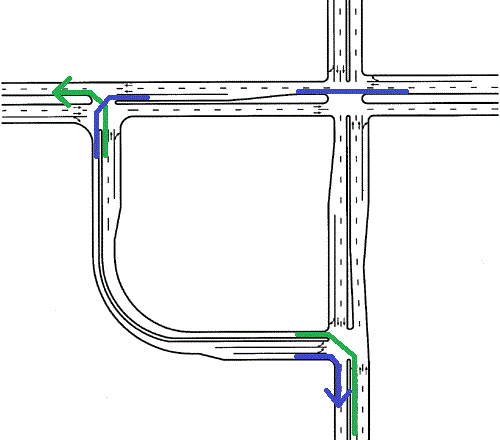
A single-quadrant roadway intersection. Note how left turns are not available at the main intersection. This allows the signaling there to work with just two phases instead of four. Left-turning traffic is directed away from the main intersection, as exemplified by green and blue traffic: Green traffic arrives from the south and wants to turn left/west. Blue traffic arrives from the east and want to turn left/south. Left-turning traffic from the remaining two directions not shown for clarity.

A quadrant roadway intersection adds an additional "quadrant roadway" between two legs of an intersection. This roadway adds two three-way intersections in addition to the original four-way intersection, moving all left turns (in right-hand traffic countries) or right turns (in left-hand traffic countries) from the main intersection. The design is intended to improve traffic flow by reducing signal timing phases from four to two in the main intersection. The design is intended for intersections where large artery routes meet in an area of dense development and high pedestrian volume.

Proponents also point to a reduction in places where accidents could occur from vehicles potentially crossing paths, as well as a low development cost compared to roundabouts or the more complex single-point urban interchange designs. Opponents point to the increase in points where accidents could occur with merging traffic as well as the non-traditional nature of the design, which has the potential to confuse drivers. Opponents also rebut low-cost claims, pointing to right-of-way and construction costs of the quadrant road.

A related structure known as a jughandle accomplishes similar traffic movement from a more compact shape.

== Double-quadrant intersections ==
Single-quadrant intersections (pictured above) feature a single quadrant road.

A double-quadrant intersection (or two-quadrant intersection) adds a second quadrant road placed opposite another.

== Quadrant interchanges ==
German one-quadrant interchange (or Verkehrsknoten teilplangleich)

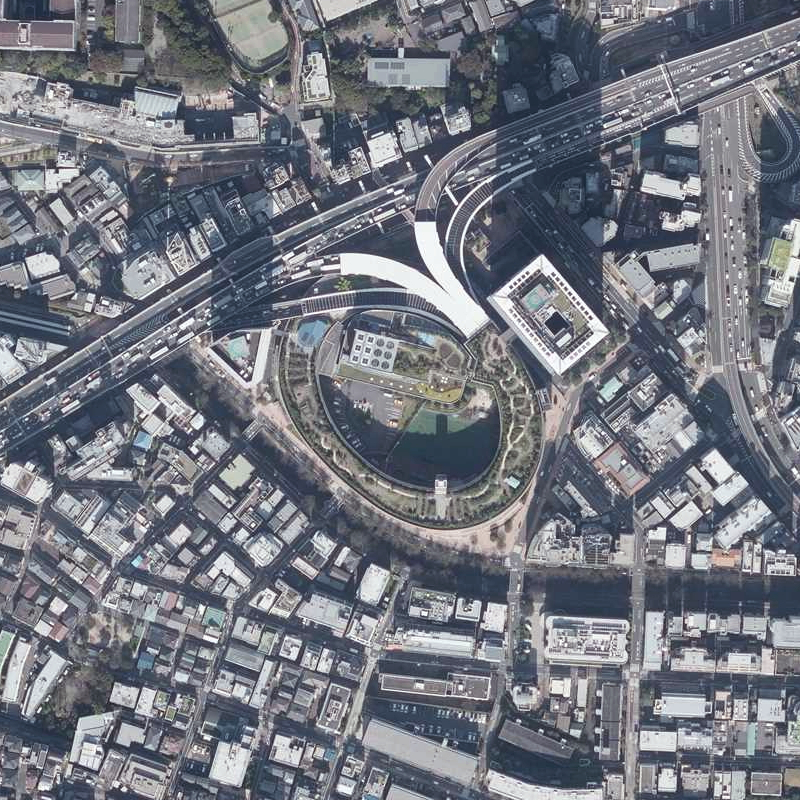
Japanese quadrant interchange of Ohashi Junction in Tokyo. Circular ramps can be seen on the southwest quadrant at the intersection of Shibuya Route and Central Circular Route, Shuto Expressway.

An interchange variant of the quadrant roadway intersection links grade-separated roads, generally a faster road with denser traffic, to a less traveled, slower road, via the quadrant road. This design is referred to as a one-quadrant interchange or as a single-loop intersection. This type of junction is common in Germany, where it is called a "partial at-grade intersection" (German: Teilplangleicher Verkehrsknoten). A so-called two-quadrant interchange also exists, which adds a second quadrant road (although the term "two-quadrant interchange" could be applied to any grade-separated junction in which there are ramps in two quadrants).

Ohashi Junction in Tokyo, Japan, is also a one-quadrant interchange connecting the elevated Shibuya Route and the underground Central Circular Route of Shuto Expressway. With circular ramps built on the southwest quadrant of two expressways, the Ohashi JCT was designed in a four-leveled manner.

== Examples ==
=== United Kingdom ===
An example of a left-hand traffic double-quadrant interchange can be found in Newport at the intersection of Corporation Road and the A48 (51.5766°N 2.9685°W).
