= Yashio =

Yashio may refer to the following places in Japan:

- Yashio, Saitama, city in Saitama Prefecture
- Yashio, Tokyo, district of Shinagawa
