= Ōi Junction =

- 大井ジャンクション; Ōi Jankushon; Ōi JCT
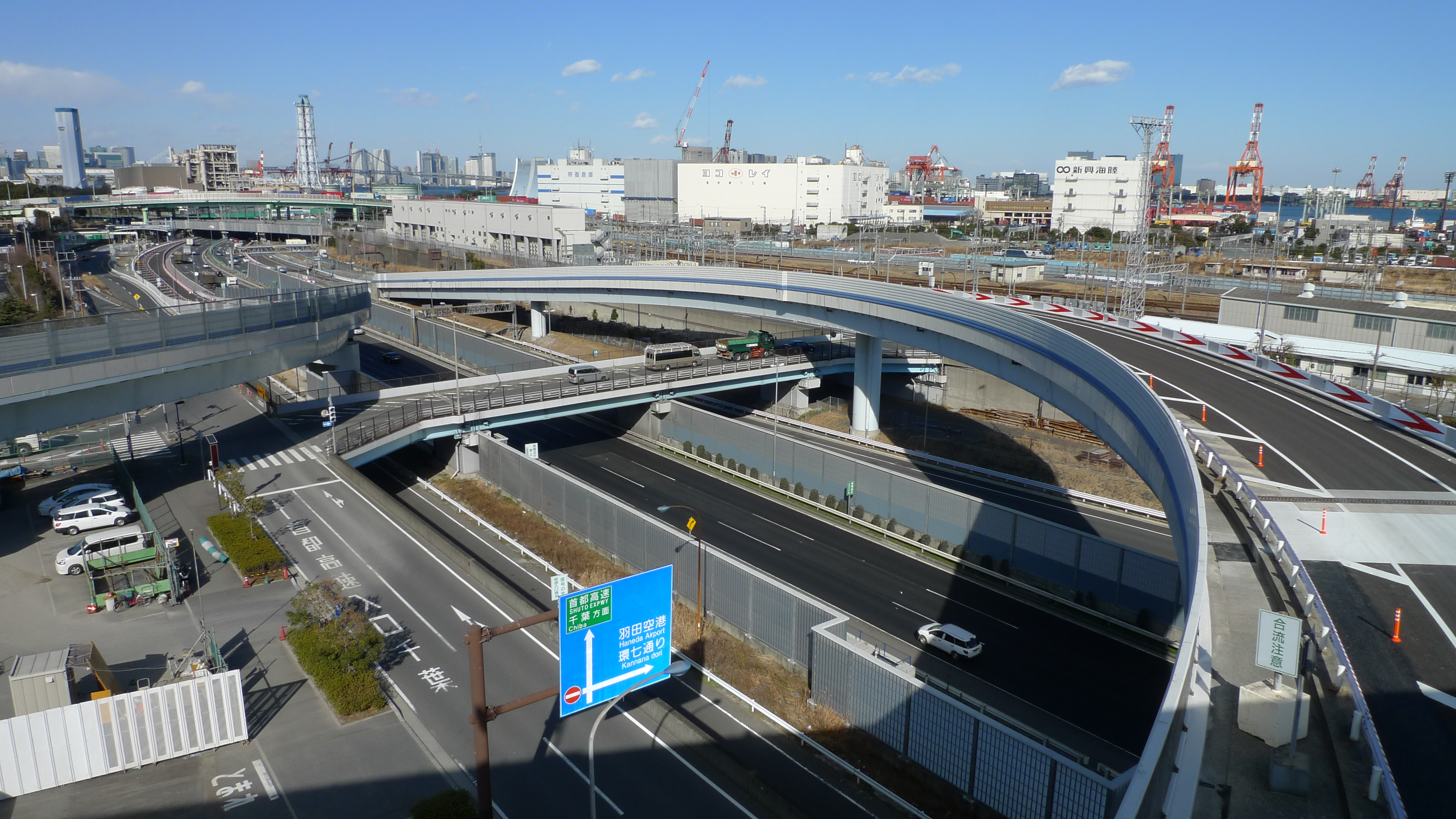
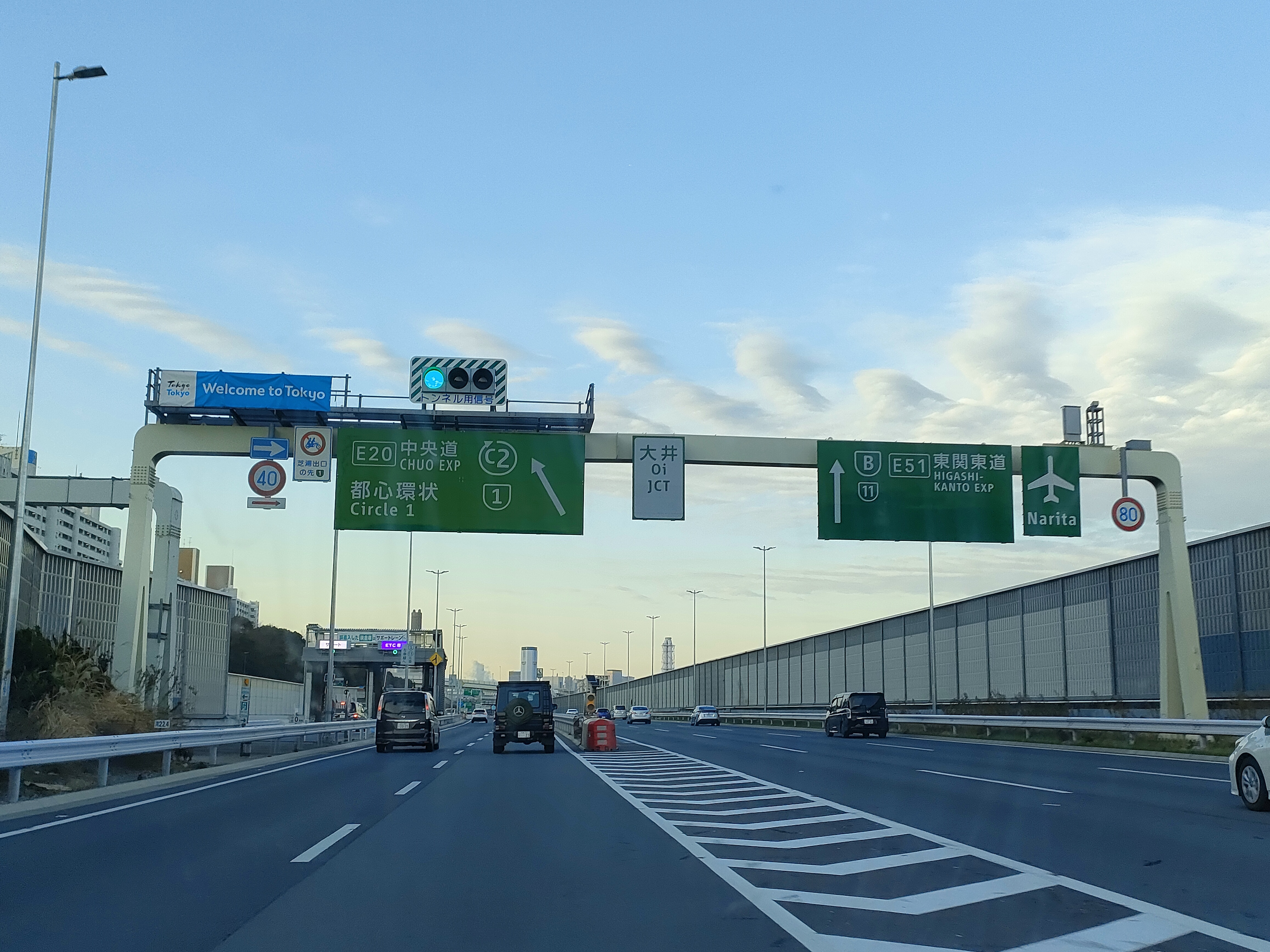
- Interactive map of Ōi Junction

Location
- Yashio, Shinagawa, Tokyo
- Coordinates: 35°36′21″N 139°45′18″E

Construction

The Ōi Junction (大井ジャンクション, Ōi Jankushon) is a junction that connects the Bayshore Route, Haneda Route, and Central Circular Route of the Shuto Expressway in Yashio, Shinagawa, Tokyo.

== Overview ==
Until November 19, 2013, the Ōi Junction was a one-way junction from both directions on the Bayshore Route to the Haneda Route's northbound line, but due to a change in the operation of the junction due to the connection of the Central Circular Route, the connecting road of the Bayshore Route's westbound line (toward Yokohama) to the Haneda Route going up was closed at 20:00 on that day. In addition, due to the construction of the Central Circular Route, Ōi Parking Area moved to Yokohama on July 17, 2012.

The Central Circular Route was connected on March 7, 2015, connecting the westbound of the Bayshore Route to the outer loop of the Central Circular Route, the eastbound of the Bayshore Route to both the uphill of the Haneda Route and the outer loop of the Central Circular Route, and the inner loop of the Central Circular Route to both directions of the Bayshore Route.

On June 8, 2016, the connecting road from the eastbound of the Bayshore Route to the uphill of the Haneda Route was closed due to the renewal work of the Haneda Route Higashi Shinagawa Pier/Samesu Landfill. However, the closure was lifted when the route was provisionally connected to the upstream circuit on September 29, 2019.

In addition, due to the abolition of the Oi Main Line tollgate, the Oi-minami Interchange, which was in front of the junction of the Bayshore Route eastbound and the Central Circular Route, was converted to exclusive use for the Central Circular Route outerbound on April 15, 2019, and the name was changed. It was changed to the Oi-minami entrance, and from the same day, the junction of this JCT was relocated to the front (closer to Yokohama) of the Oi-minami entrance.
