= Meguro River =

Coordinates: 35.645927°N 139.698611°E

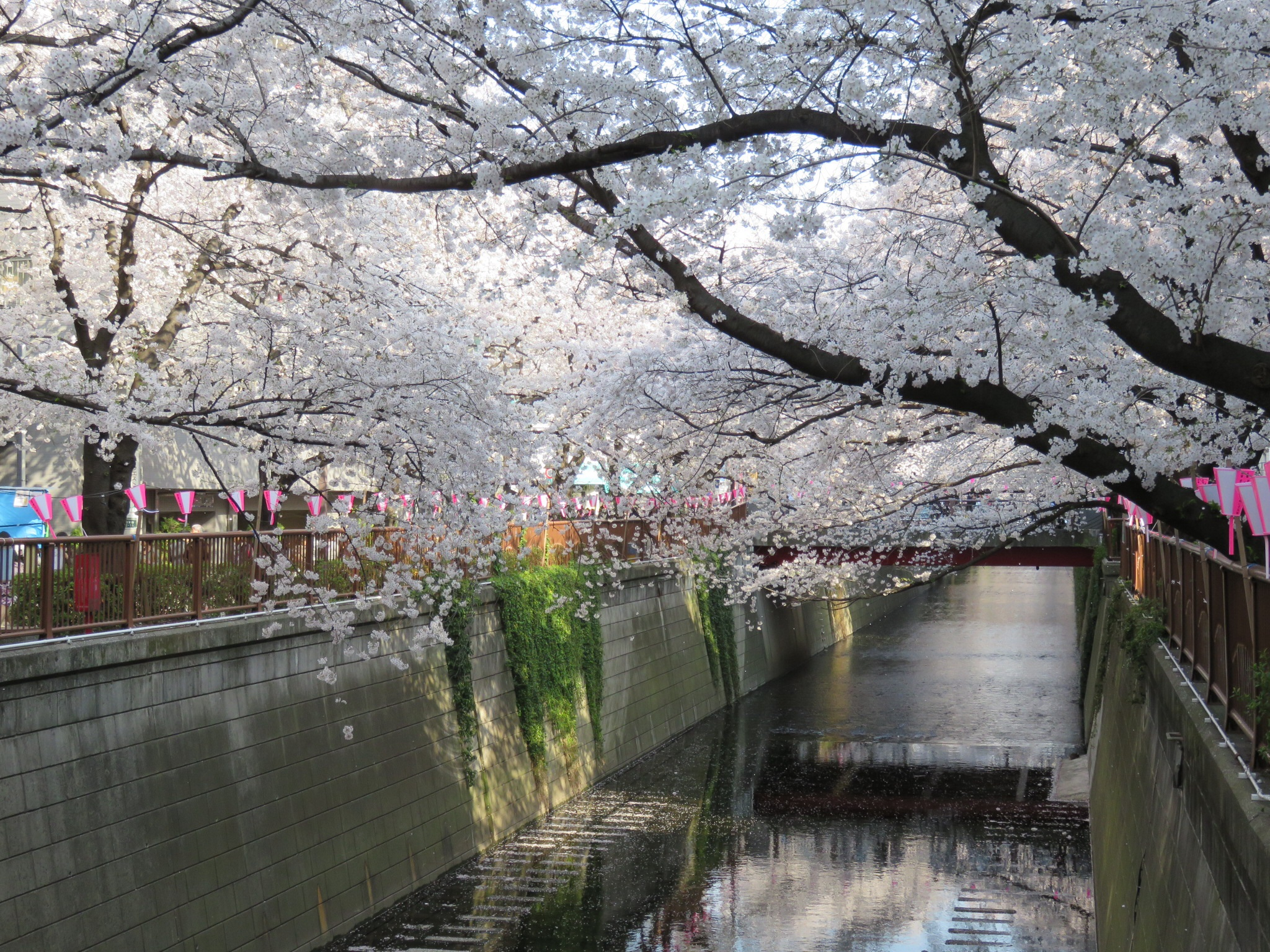
- Meguro River near Naka Meguro

Location
- Country: Japan

Physical characteristics
- Source
  - location: Confluence of the Kitazawa and Karasuyama tributaries, Tokyo, Japan
- Mouth
  - location: Shinagawa, Tokyo, Tokyo Bay
- Length: 7.82 km (4.86 mi)
- Basin size: 45.8 km^{2} (17.7 sq mi)

The Meguro River (目黒川, Meguro-gawa) is a river which flows through Tokyo, Japan. Its tributaries include the Kitazawa River and the Karasuyama River. The river flows into Tokyo Bay near the Tennōzu Isle Station.

The river is 7.82 km (4.86 mi) in length and passes through Setagaya, Meguro and Shinagawa wards.

The river banks are extensively landscaped and act as an urban green space for communities along its length. Close to the source of the river in Setagaya, the river is divided vertically between a large underground storm drain and surface level landscaped ornamental stream. At Ōhashi Junction where the river passes under the Route 246 and the Tōmei Expressway, the river re-emerges as a broader, surface level water channel.

The river is a popular venue for cherry blossom viewing in the spring.

== Access ==
Public transportation access to the pedestrianized riverside walking paths include (from North to South):

- Ikejiri-Ōhashi Station on the Tōkyū Den-en-toshi Line
- Naka-Meguro Station on the Tōkyū Tōyoko Line and Tokyo Metro Hibiya Line
- Meguro Station on the JR East Yamanote Line, Tokyo Metro Namboku Line, Toei Mita Line and Tokyu Meguro Line.
- Gotanda Station on the on JR East Yamanote Line, Toei Asakusa Line and Tokyu Ikegami Line.

== Gallery ==
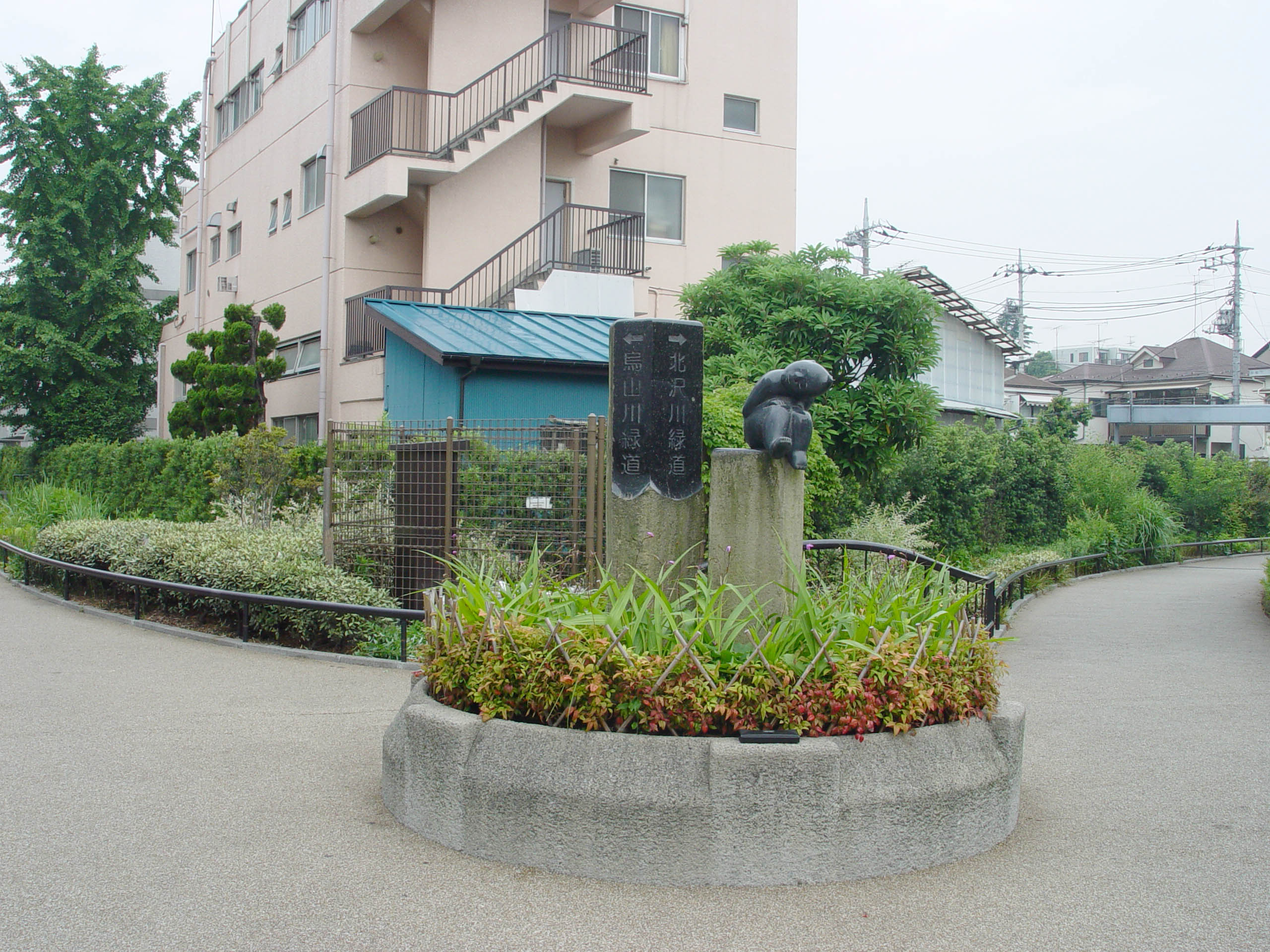
Source of the Meguro River at Setagaya

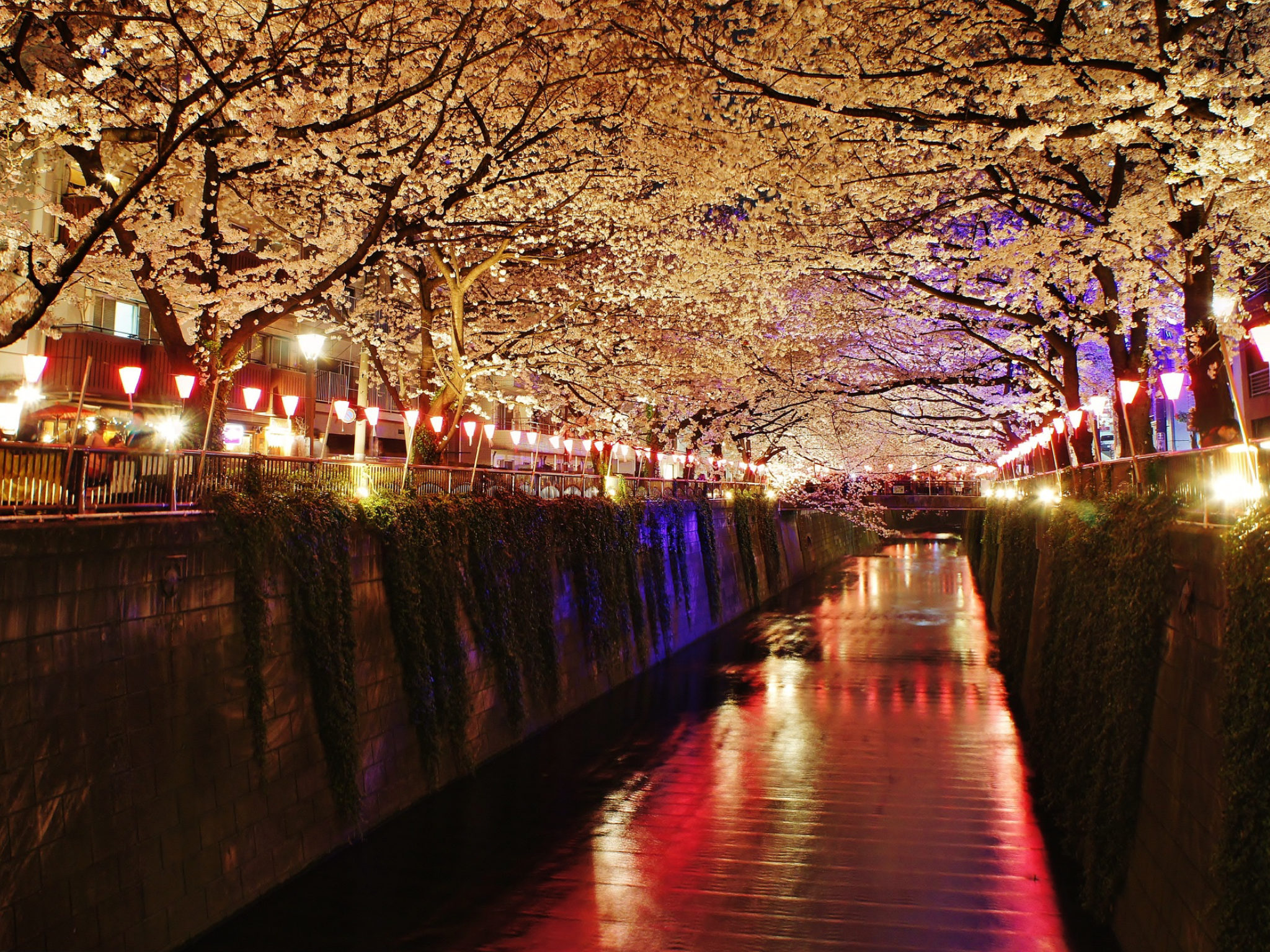
Night time illumination for the Meguro River Cherry Blossoms

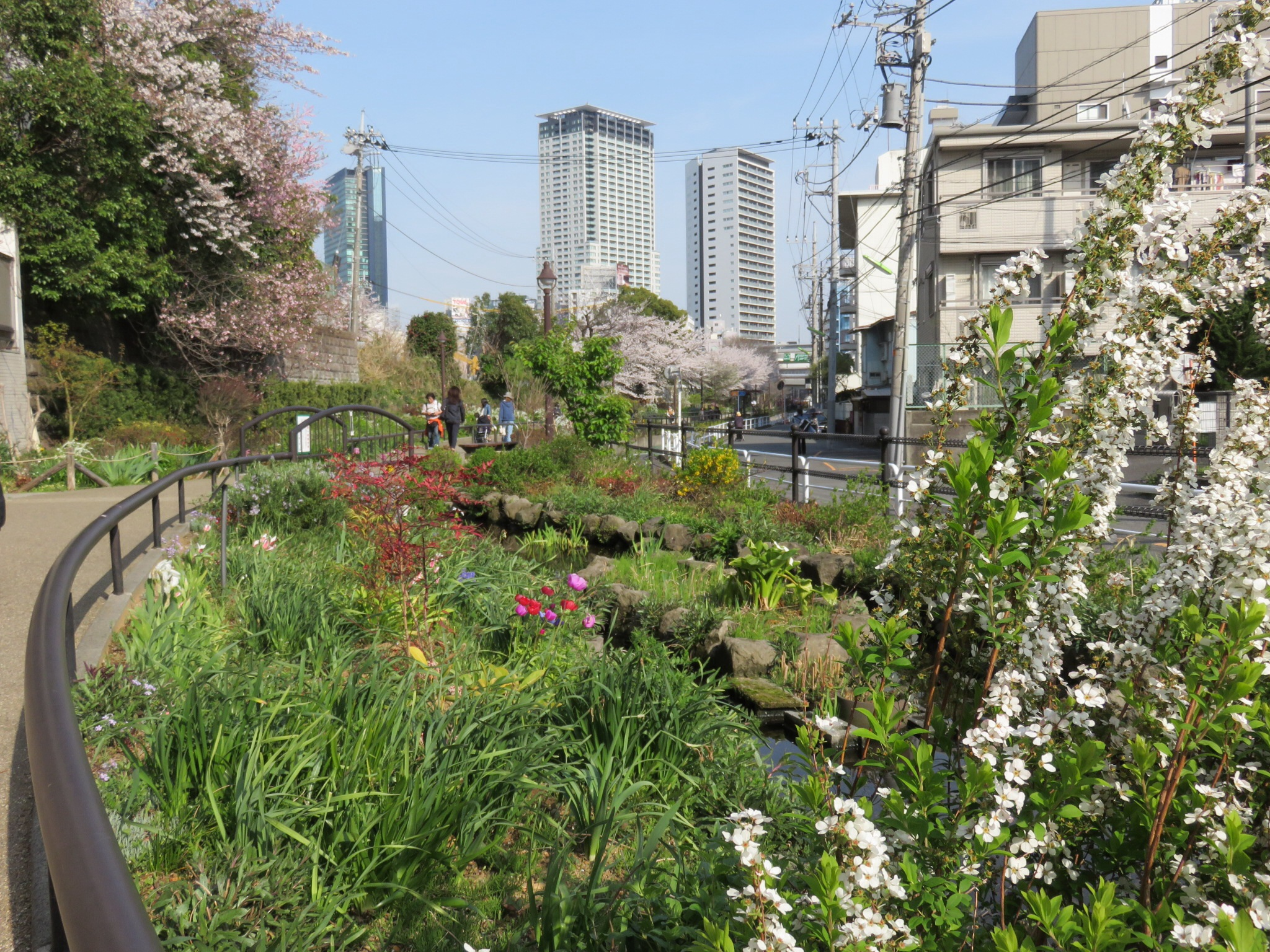
Meguro River, pedestrian path approaching Ōhashi, Meguro

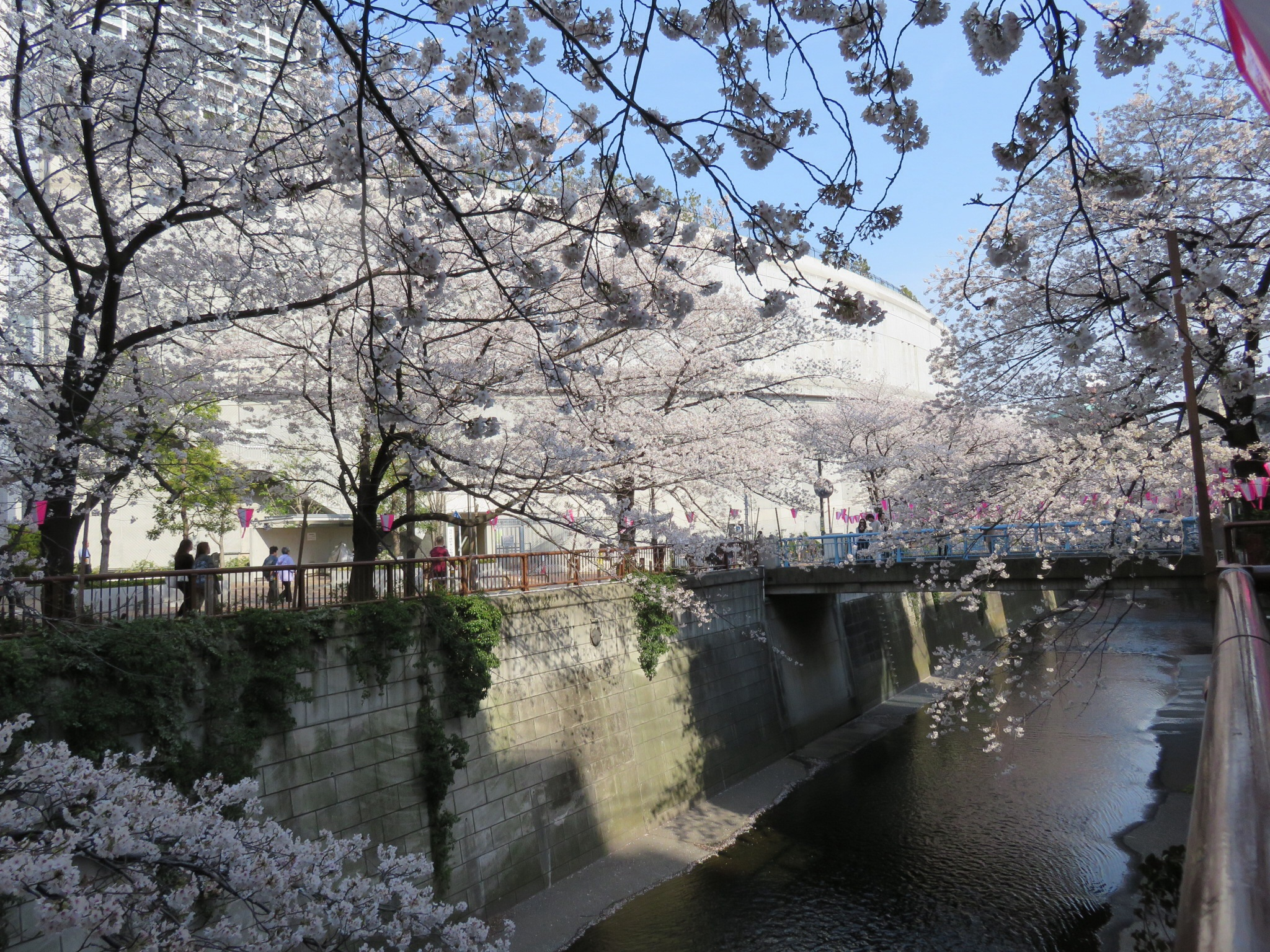
Meguro River and Ōhashi Junction

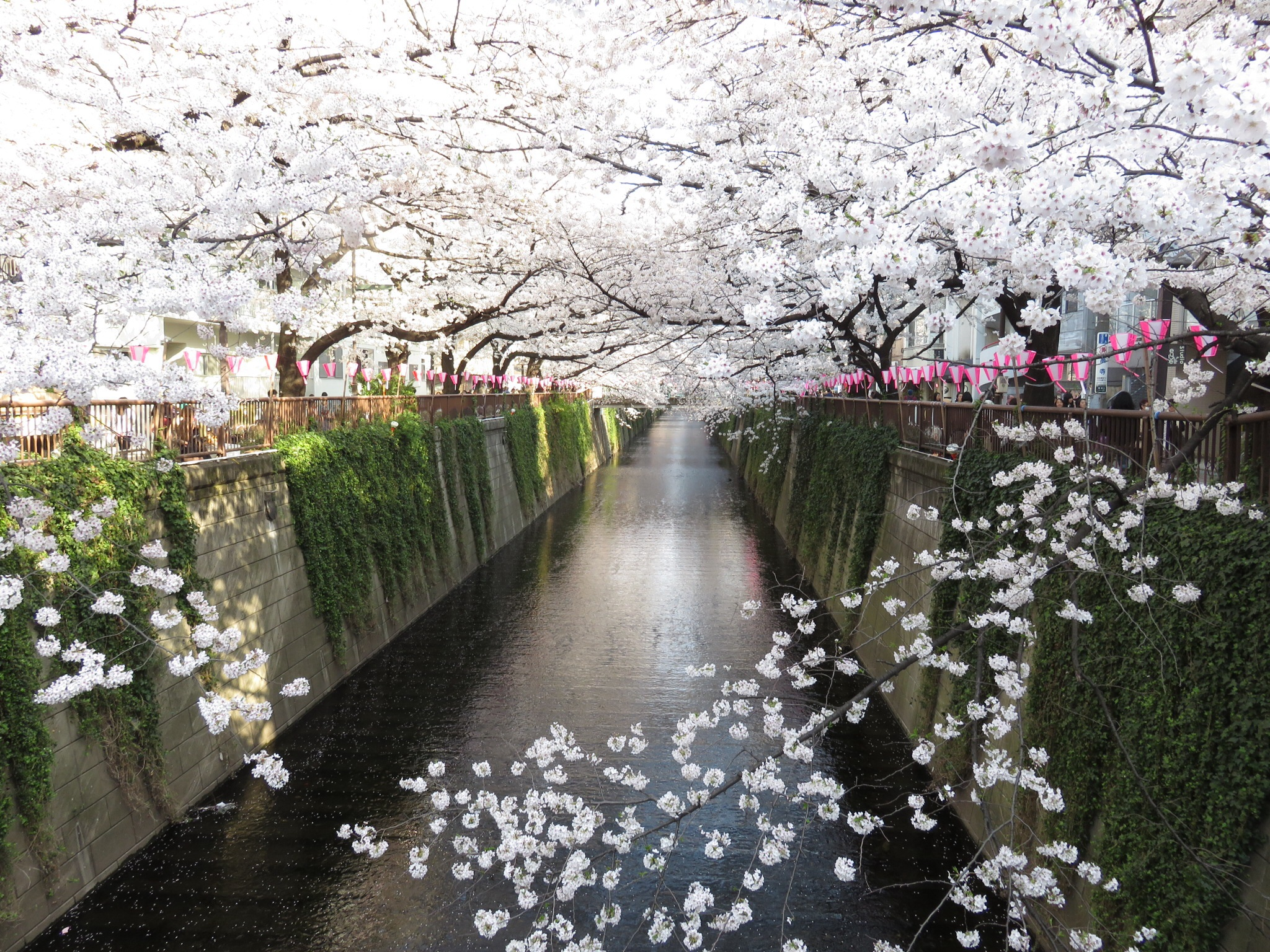
Meguro River and cherry-blossom trees in Spring 2014

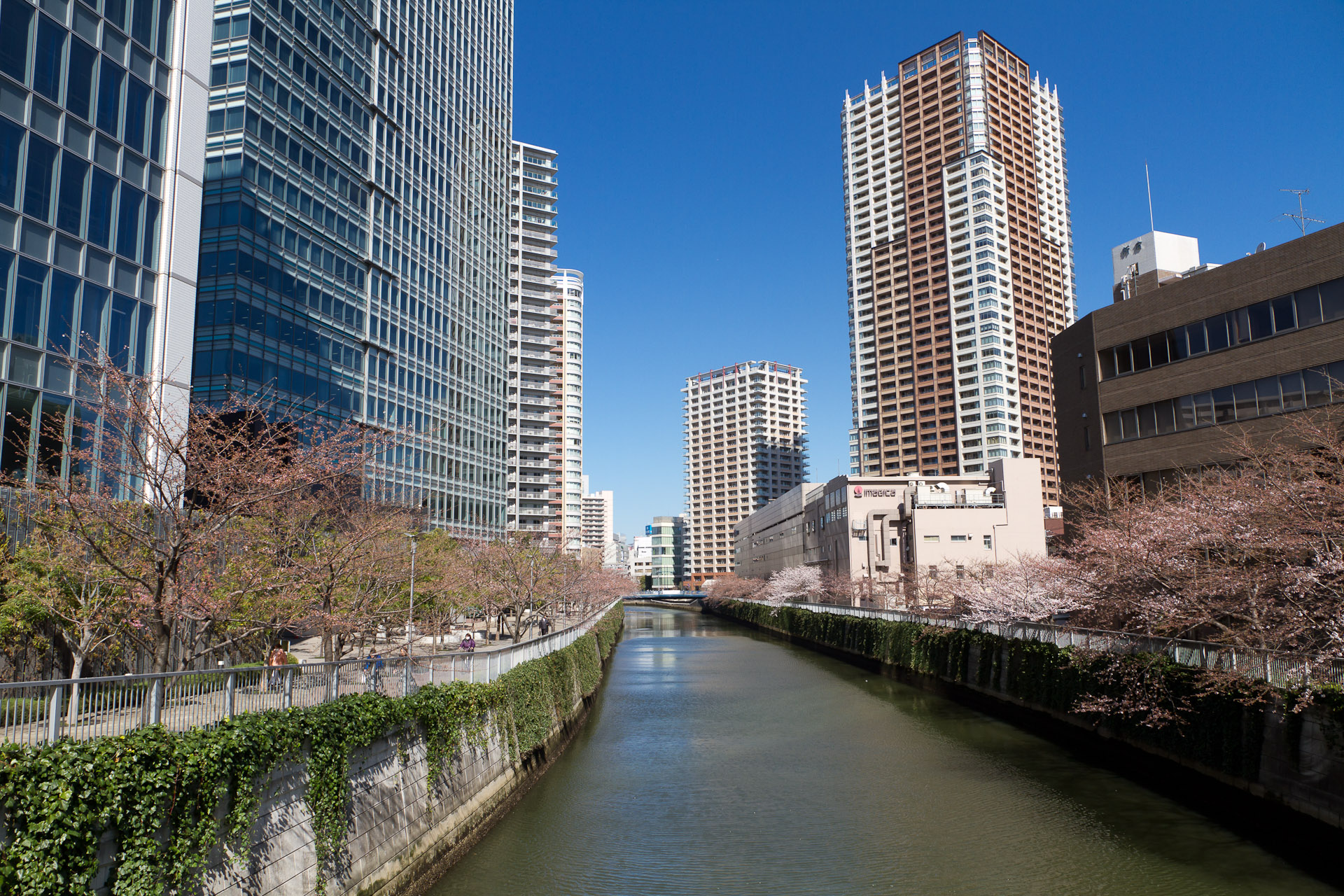
Meguro River at Ōsaki, Shinagawa

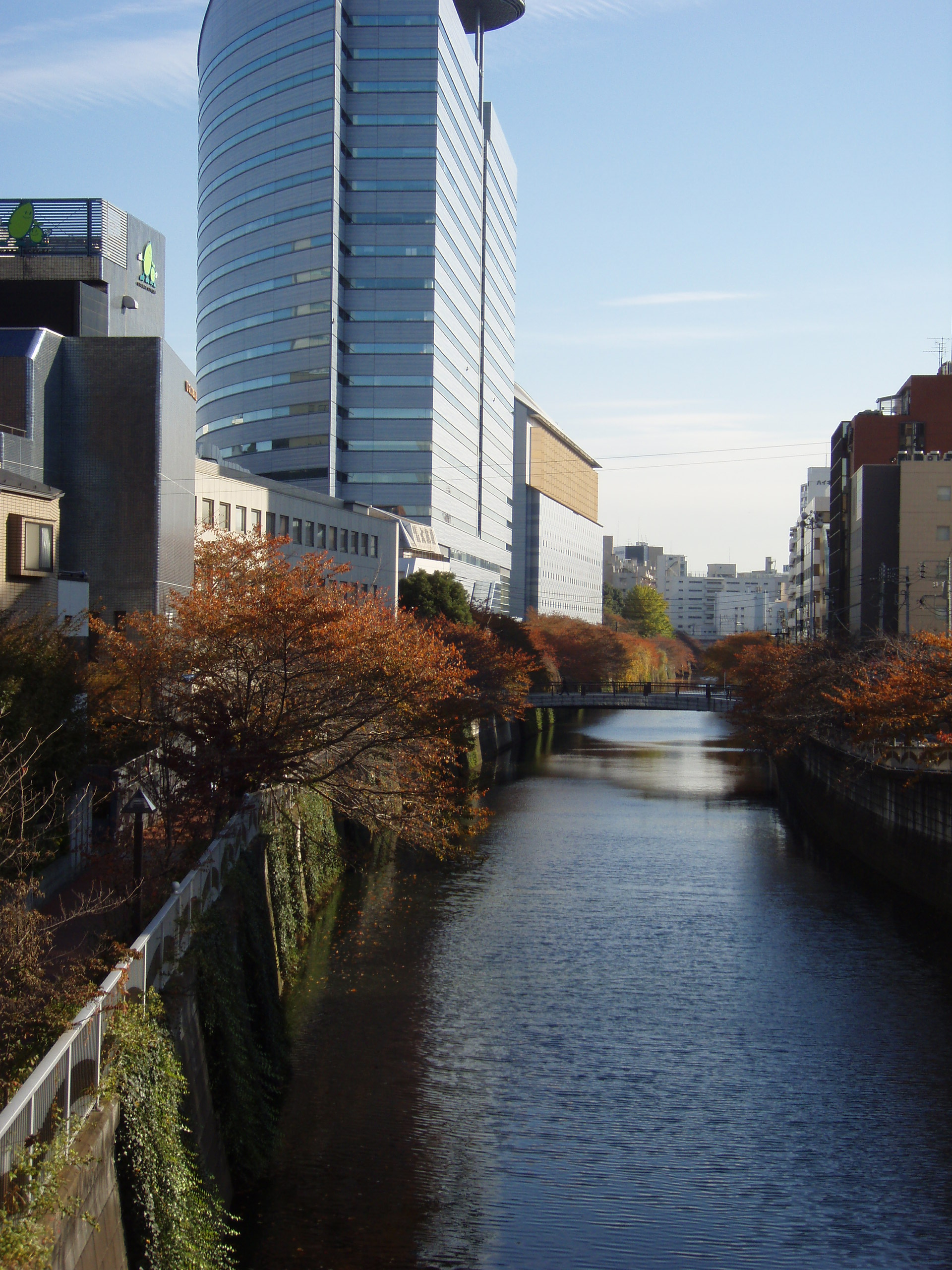
Taiko-bashi Bridge at Shimomeguro

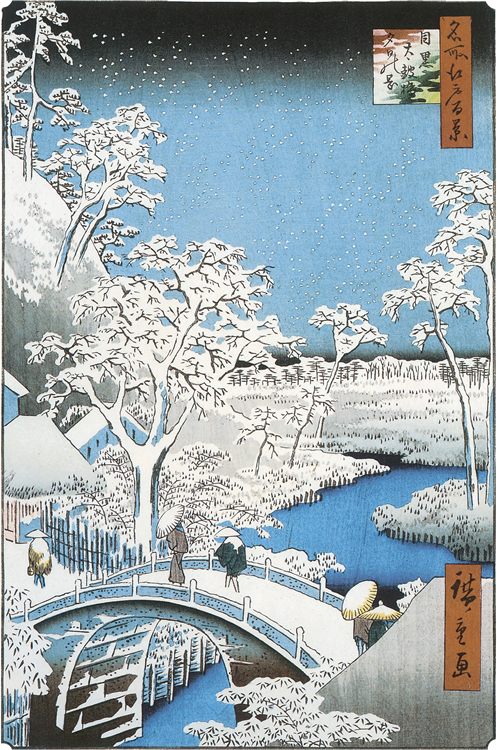
Taiko-bashi Bridge in 1857 by Hiroshige

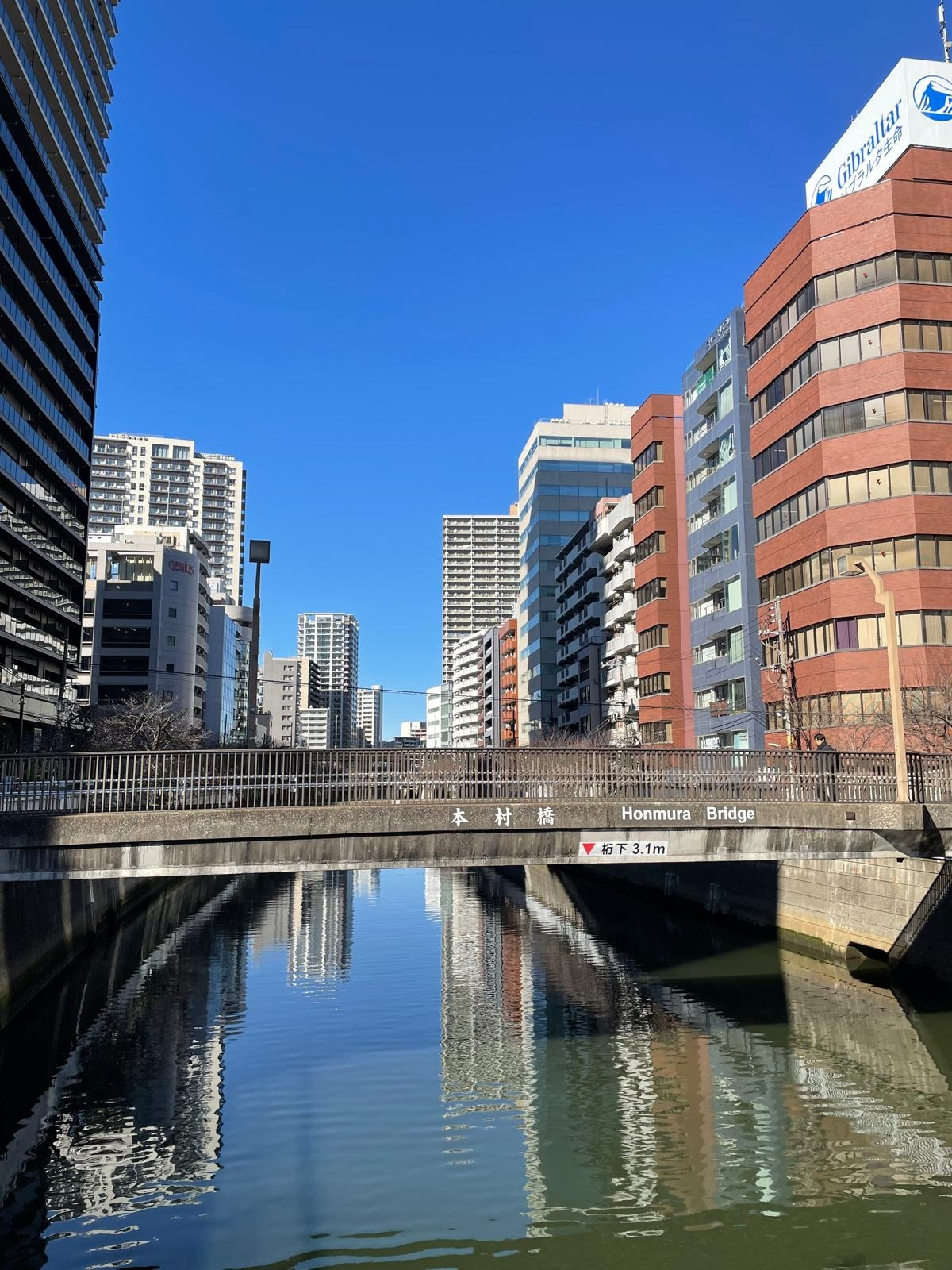
Honmura bridge at Meguro river, in Tokyo

== See also ==
- Meguro, Tokyo
