= Central Circular Route =

Circular expressway in the Greater Tokyo area

Central Circular Route

Route information
- Maintained by Metropolitan Expressway Company Limited
- Length: 46.9 km (29.1 mi)
- Existed: 1982–present
- Restrictions: No vehicles with dangerous goods allowed in the Yamate Tunnel

Major junctions
- Beltway around Tokyo
- Counterclockwise end: Bayshore Route at Ōi Junction in Yashio, Shinagawa
- Shibuya Route at Ōhashi Junction in Meguro; Shinjuku Route in Shinjuku; Ikebukuro Route in Itabashi; Kawaguchi Route in Adachi; Misato Route and Mukojima Route in Katsushika; Komatsugawa Route in Edogawa
- Clockwise end: Bayshore Route at Kasai Junction in Edogawa

Location
- Country: Japan

Highway system
- National highways of Japan; Expressways of Japan

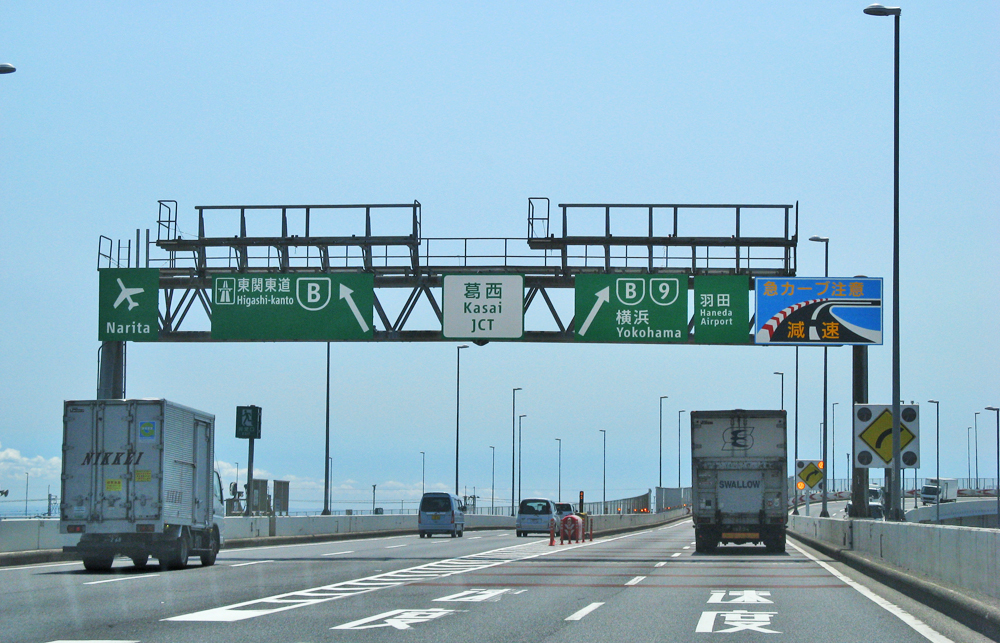
Kasai JCT

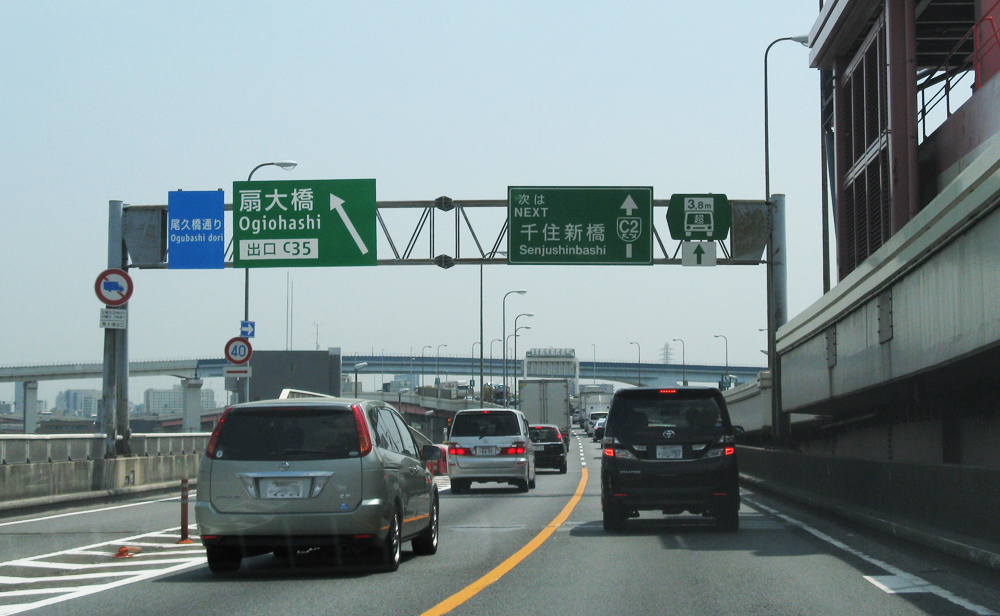
Ōgi-ōhashi exit

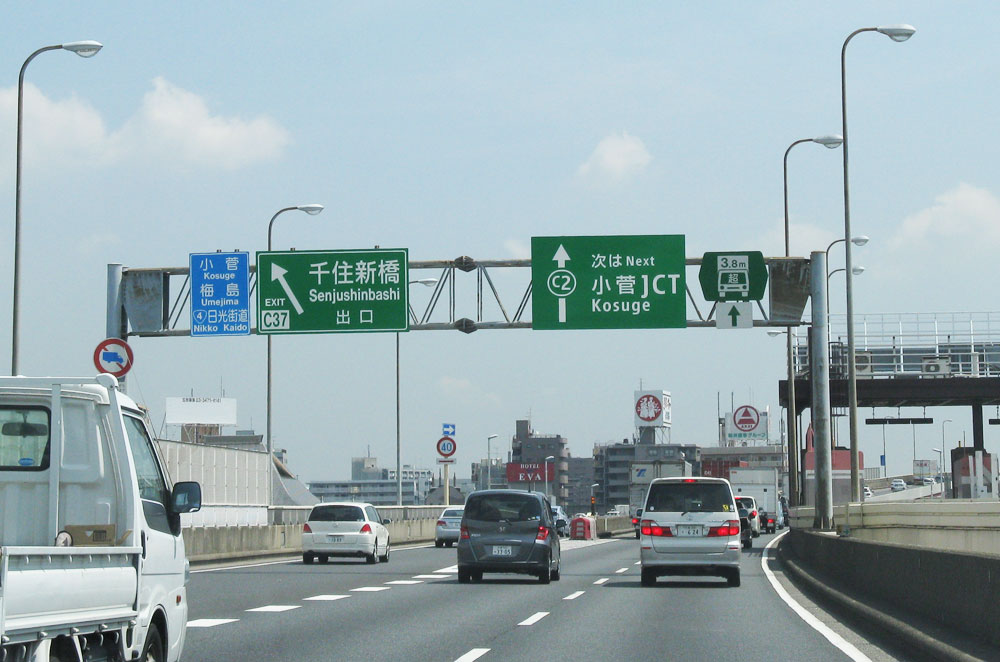
Senju-shinbashi exit

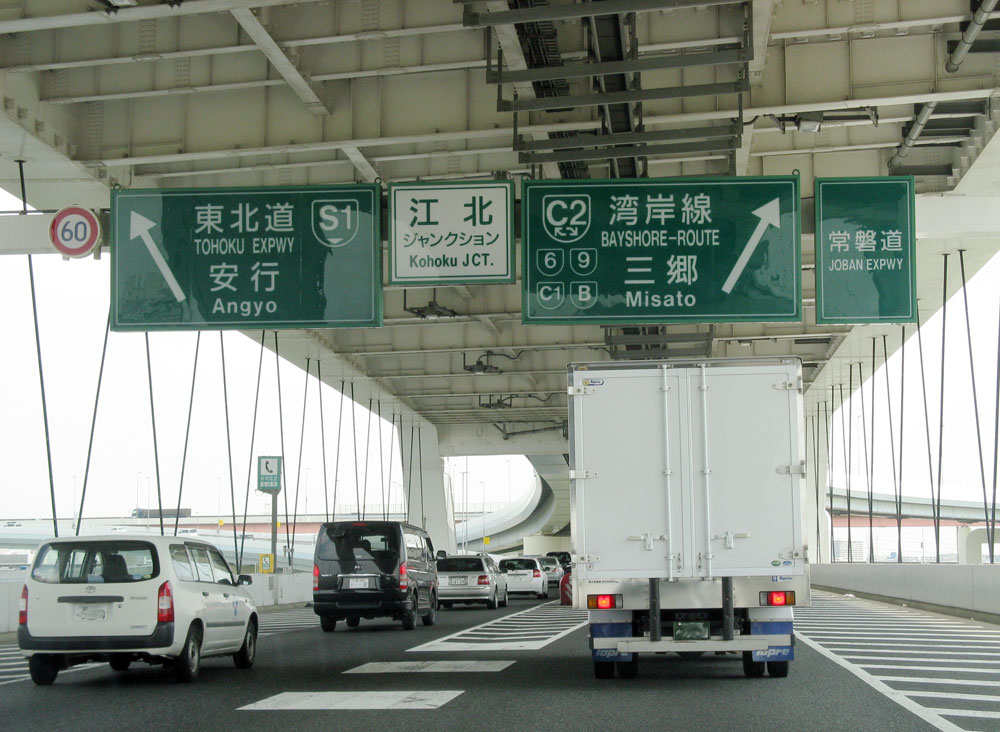
Kohoku JCT

The Central Circular Route (中央環状線, Chūō Kanjō-sen), signed as Route C2, is one of the routes of the Shuto Expressway system serving the central part of the Greater Tokyo Area. The route is a circumferential highway running through the outer wards of Tokyo. The route is the middle of four ring expressways planned for the city; the other three being the C1 Inner Circular Route, the C3 Tokyo Gaikan Expressway, and the C4 Ken-Ō Expressway.

== Route description ==
The Central Circular Route has a total length of 48.8 kilometers (30.3 mi).

It is a ring that lies approximately 8 km (5.0 mi) from the center of the city and goes through the wards of Edogawa, Katsushika, Adachi, Kita, Itabashi, Toshima, Shinjuku, Nakano, Shibuya, Meguro, and Shinagawa.

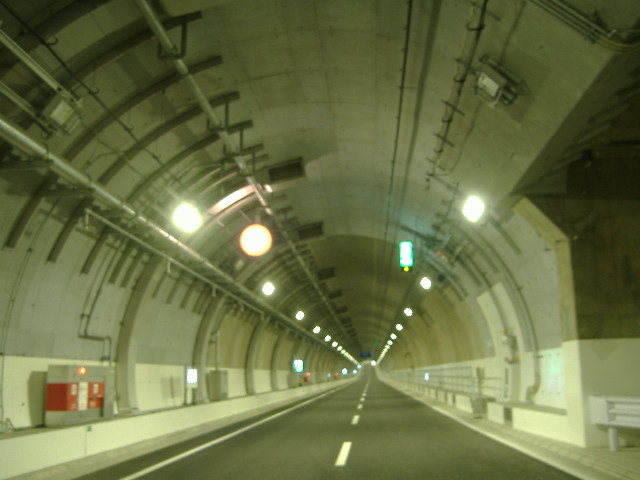
Yamate Tunnel

The eastern half is an elevated structure and the western half is an underground one. The Yamate Tunnel is a deep tunnel constructed beneath Yamate Street, the first section over 11 km (6.8 mi) in length, was opened to traffic on 22 December 2007. From 2010, the tunnel extended the Central Circular Route south from near Ikebukuro to Ohashi Junction connecting with Route 3. The last 9.4 kilometers (5.8 mi) through Meguro and Shinagawa was opened to traffic on 7 March 2015. When this last section of the tunnel opened the Yamate Tunnel formed Japan's longest, and the world's second longest road tunnel. During the tunnel's first week of operations, traffic volume on the Inner Circular Route was reduced by seven percent from the previous week, and congestion on expressways inside the Central Circular Route (an index measured by recording segments where average traffic speed is less than 40 km/h (24.9 mph), and multiplying the affected distance by the affected time) was approximately halved from the previous week.

The C2 begins and ends at the Bayshore Route, which serves to close the southeastern part of the loop.

== History ==
The first section of the Central Circular Route was opened to traffic on 30 March 1982. Since then, the expressway was completed in phases. Construction work on underground sections of the route began in 1992. Given the extensive tunneling and engineering challenges involved, construction costs for the route were estimated to be 2 trillion yen. The Central Circular Route was completed on 7 March 2015.

== Exit list ==
Location	km	mi	Exit	Name	Destinations	Notes
Shinagawa	0.0	0.0	—	Ōi	Bayshore Route – Urayasu, Shin-Kiba, Haneda Airport	Counterclockwise terminus
Shinagawa	0.6	0.37	South end of Yamate Tunnel			
Shinagawa	1.2	0.75	C18	Ōi Minami	National Route 357 (Tokyo Bay Road)	Northbound exit and southbound entrance; smart interchange
Shinagawa	6.0	3.7	C20	Gotanda	Tokyo Metropolitan Route 317 (Yamate-dori)	Southbound exit and northbound entrance
Meguro	9.4	5.8	–	Ōhashi	Shibuya Route west to Tōmei Expressway – Yoga Shibuya Route east – Tanimachi	
Shibuya	11.4	7.1	C22	Tomigaya	Tokyo Metropolitan Route 317 (Yamate-dori)	Southbound exit and northbound entrance; smart interchange
Shibuya	11.8	7.3	C23	Hatsudai-minami	Tokyo Metropolitan Route 317 (Yamate-dori)	Northbound exit and southbound entrance; smart interchange
Shinjuku	13.0	8.1	–	Nishi-Shinjuku	Shinjuku Route west to Chuo Expressway – Takaido Shinjuku Route east – Miyakezaka	
Nakano	14.7	9.1	C24	Nakano-Chojabashi	National Route 20 (Kōshū Kaidō)	Southbound exit and northbound entrance; to Tokyo Metropolitan Government Building
Toshima	18.5	11.5	C25	Nishi-Ikebukuro	Mejiro-dori Tokyo Metropolitan Route 441 (Kanamecho-dori)	Southbound exit and northbound entrance
Toshima	18.8	11.7	North end of Yamate Tunnel			
Toshima	20.1	12.5	C26	Nishi-Ikebukuro	Mejiro-dori Tokyo Metropolitan Route 441 (Kanamecho-dori)	Northbound exit and southbound entrance
Toshima	20.1	12.5	C28	Tomigaya	Tokyo Metropolitan Route 317 (Yamate-dori)	Northbound entrance only via ECT; rest of exit closed in 2007
Itabashi	20.4	12.7	–	Kumanocho	Ikebukuro Route – Ginza, Higashi-Ikebukuro	No direct access from northbound Central Circular Route to southbound Ikebukuro Route
Itabashi	21.4	13.3	–	Itabashi	Ikebukuro Route north to Kan-Etsu Expressway – Omiya	
Itabashi	21.5	13.4	Cardinal direction change: West Leg (north-south) / North Leg (west-east)			
Itabashi – Kita boundary	22.3– 22.4	13.9– 13.9	C29 C31	Shin-Itabashi	National Route 17 (Nakasendo)	Eastbound exit only Westbound exit and eastbound entrance; smart interchange
Kita	25.4	15.8	C33	Oji-Minami	National Route 122	Eastbound exit and westbound entrance
Kita	26.1	16.2	C34	Oji-Kita	Tokyo Metropolitan Route 306 (Oji-Senju Yumenoshima-sen)	Westbound exit and eastbound entrance
Adachi	27.9	17.3	–	Kohoku	Kawaguchi Route north to Tohoku Expressway – Kawaguchi	
Adachi	28.4 29.4	17.6 18.3	C35 C36	Ogi-ohashi	Tokyo Metropolitan Route 58 (Ogubashi-dori)	Eastbound exit and westbound entrance Westbound exit and eastbound entrance
Adachi	31.4 32.4	19.5 20.1	C37 C38	Senju-shinbashi	National Route 4	Eastbound exit and westbound entrance Westbound exit and eastbound entrance
Katsushika	33.3	20.7	Cardinal direction change: North Leg (west-east) / East Leg (south-north)			
Katsushika	33.6	20.9	–	Kosuge	Misato Route north to Joban Expressway – Misato	North end of concurrency with Shuto Expressway Route 6
Katsushika	34.1	21.2	C40	Kosuge	Tokyo Route 308 (Heiwabashi-dori)	Northbound exit and southbound entrance
Katsushika	34.8	21.6	–	Horikiri	Mukojima Route south – Ginza, Hakozaki	South end of concurrency with Shuto Expressway Route 6
Katsushika	35.7– 36.6	22.2– 22.7	C41 C42	Yotsugi	National Route 6	Southbound signage; smart interchange Northbound signage; smart interchange
Katsushika	38.3	23.8	C43	Hirai-ohashi	Kuramaebashi-dori	Southbound exit and northbound entrance
Edogawa	40.5	25.2	C45 703	Komatsugawa	Komatsugawa Route east to Keiyō Road – Chiba Tokyo Metropolitan Route 308 (Funabori-kaidō) – Shinkoiwa, Funabori	No direct access to westbound Komatsugawa Route
Edogawa	42.2	26.2	C46	Funaboribashi	Tokyo Metropolitan Route 50 (Shin-Ohashi-dori)	Northbound exit and southbound entrance
Edogawa	44.4	27.6	C47	Seishincho	Tokyo Metropolitan Route 308 (Funabori-kaidō)	Southbound exit and northbound entrance; smart interchange
Edogawa	46.9	29.1	—	Kasai	Bayshore Route – Urayasu, Shin-Kiba, Haneda Airport	Clockwise terminus
1.000 mi = 1.609 km; 1.000 km = 0.621 mi: Closed/former; Concurrency terminus; Electronic toll collection; Incomplete access; Unopened
