= Ōhashi Junction =

Roof garden park in Ōhashi, Tokyo, Japan

- 目黒天空庭園
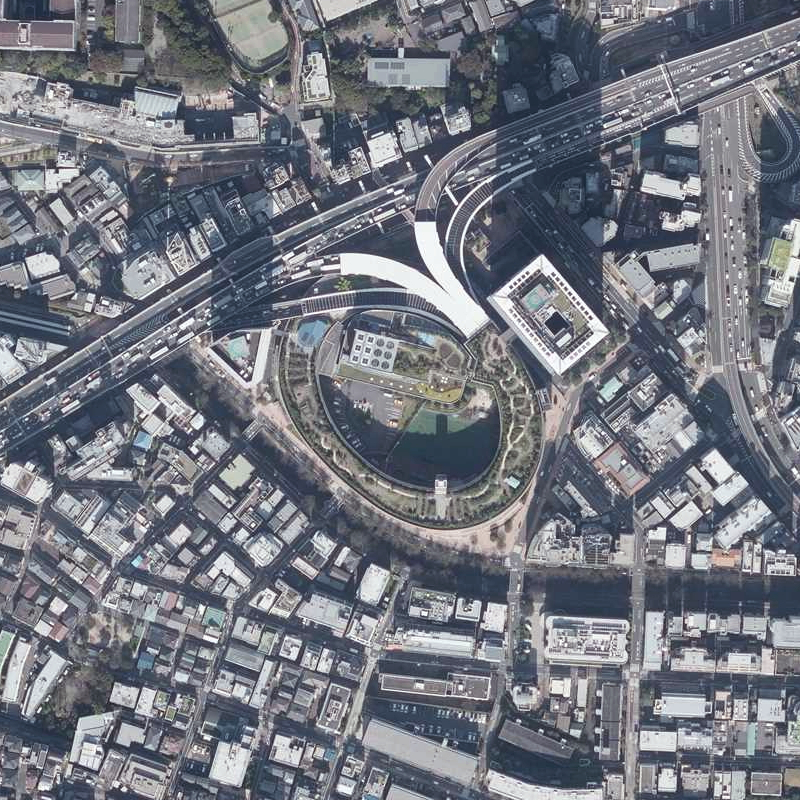
- Aerial view of Ohashi Junction
- Interactive map of Ōhashi Junction
- Location: Meguro, Tokyo, Japan
- Coordinates: 35.6513°N 139.68815°E
- Area: 7,000 square meters (75,000 ft^{2})
- Created: 2013
- Operator: Meguro City

The Ōhashi Junction (大橋ジャンクション) is a covered one-quadrant Interchange of the Shuto Expressway system in Tokyo. It connects the Shibuya Route and the Central Circular Route (C2). It was in construction from 2003 to 2013. It was partially opened in 2010 and fully completed in 2015. The completed interchange links the Central Circular Route (Shuto Expressway) through the Yamate Tunnel as far as the Bayshore Route in Shinagawa. The cost of the project was $90 billion yen.

It is designed to be as compact as possible and environmentally friendly. The Shibuya Route is an elevated highway and the Central Circular Route is underground; the Ohashi junction is a spiral bridge with four loops to allow cars to go between the two. The junction rises to a height of 35m above ground, 36m underground and has a diameter of between 130 and 175 meters.

The Meguro Sky Garden (目黒天空庭園, Meguro Tenkū Teien) is a 7000 m^{2} linear roof garden park in Ōhashi, Meguro, Tokyo, Japan, constructed over the Ohashi junction rising from 15 to 35 meters above street level. The garden serves as a freeway lid.

The road junction redevelopment also includes high rise residential housing, retail, a local Meguro government branch office, a library, community meeting rooms and all-weather sports facilities.

== History ==
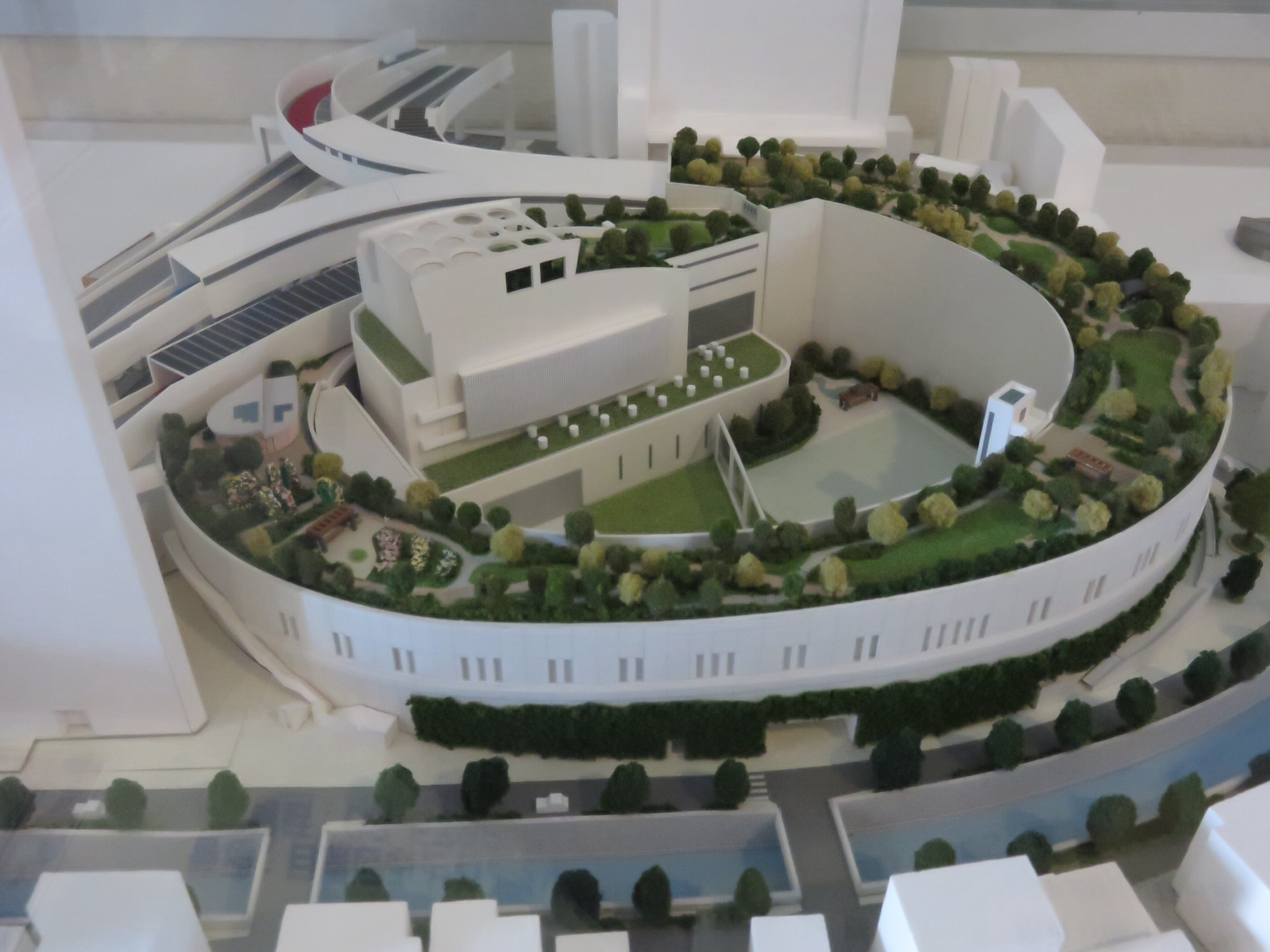
Model of the Ohashi junction, 2014

A depot of the former Tokyu Tamagawa tramway (ja:東急玉川線) was located at the site until 1969. Note that this tramway is different from the existing Tōkyū Tamagawa Line.

The Ohashi Bus Depot (ja:東急バス大橋営業所#高速道路用地へ) then operated on the site for 33 years from when the Tamagawa tramway line was discontinued until September 2002.

The initial planning decision for the junction was made August 13th 1990. (Note: "都市計画決定（当初）") The Central Circular Route's Yamate Tunnel reached Ōhashi Junction when the section between Nishi-Shinjuku and Ōhashi opened on 28 March 2010, bringing the new stacked-loop junction into service. The Meguro Sky Garden (目黒天空庭園) opened on 30 March 2013 on the roof of the junction's loop.

On 7 March 2015 the Central Circular Shinagawa Line (Ōi JCT–Ōhashi JCT) opened, completing the Central Circular Route and providing continuous travel via the Yamate Tunnel to the Bayshore Route.

== Design and environmental measures ==
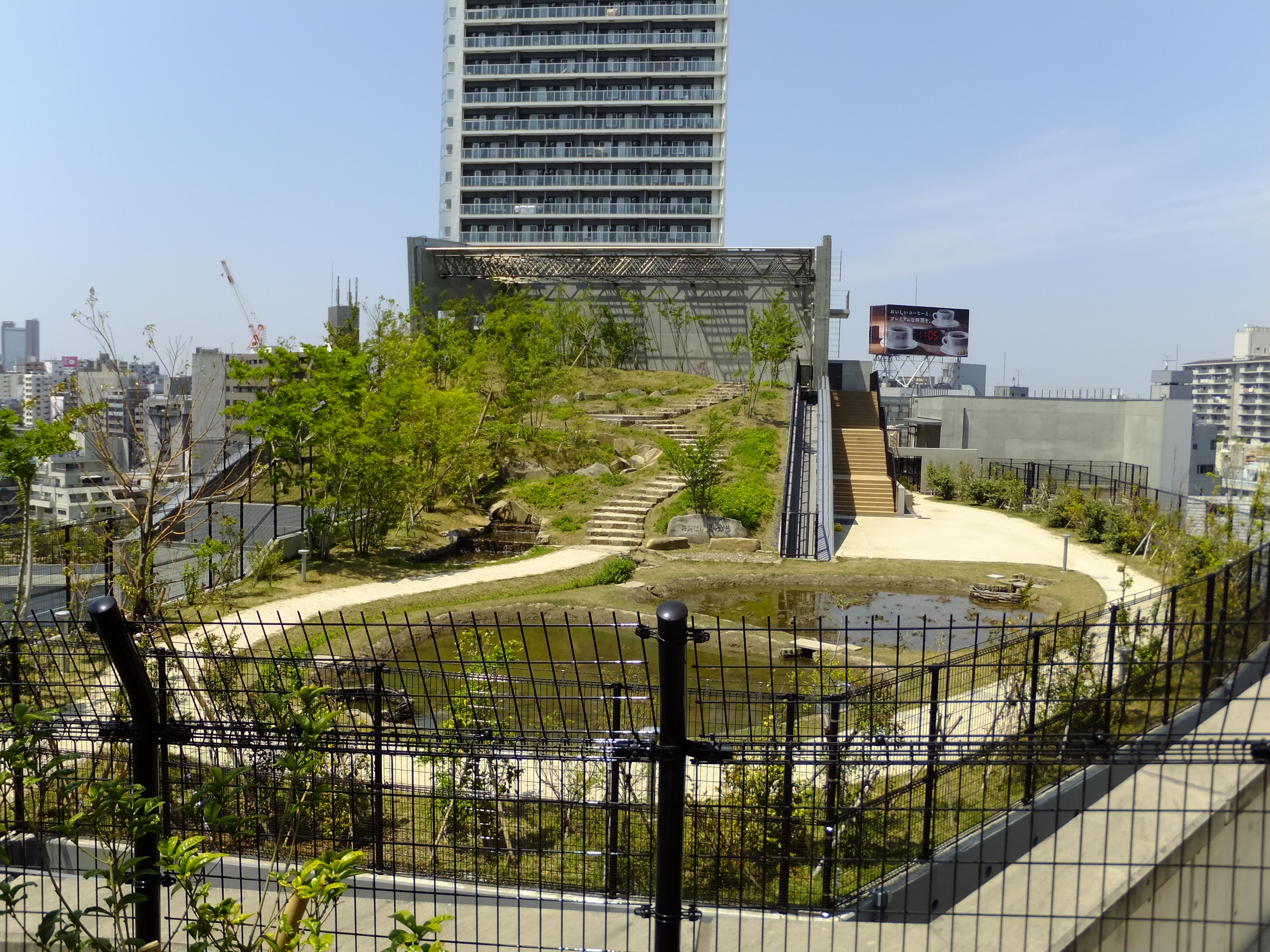
View west towards Sangenjaya, 2013

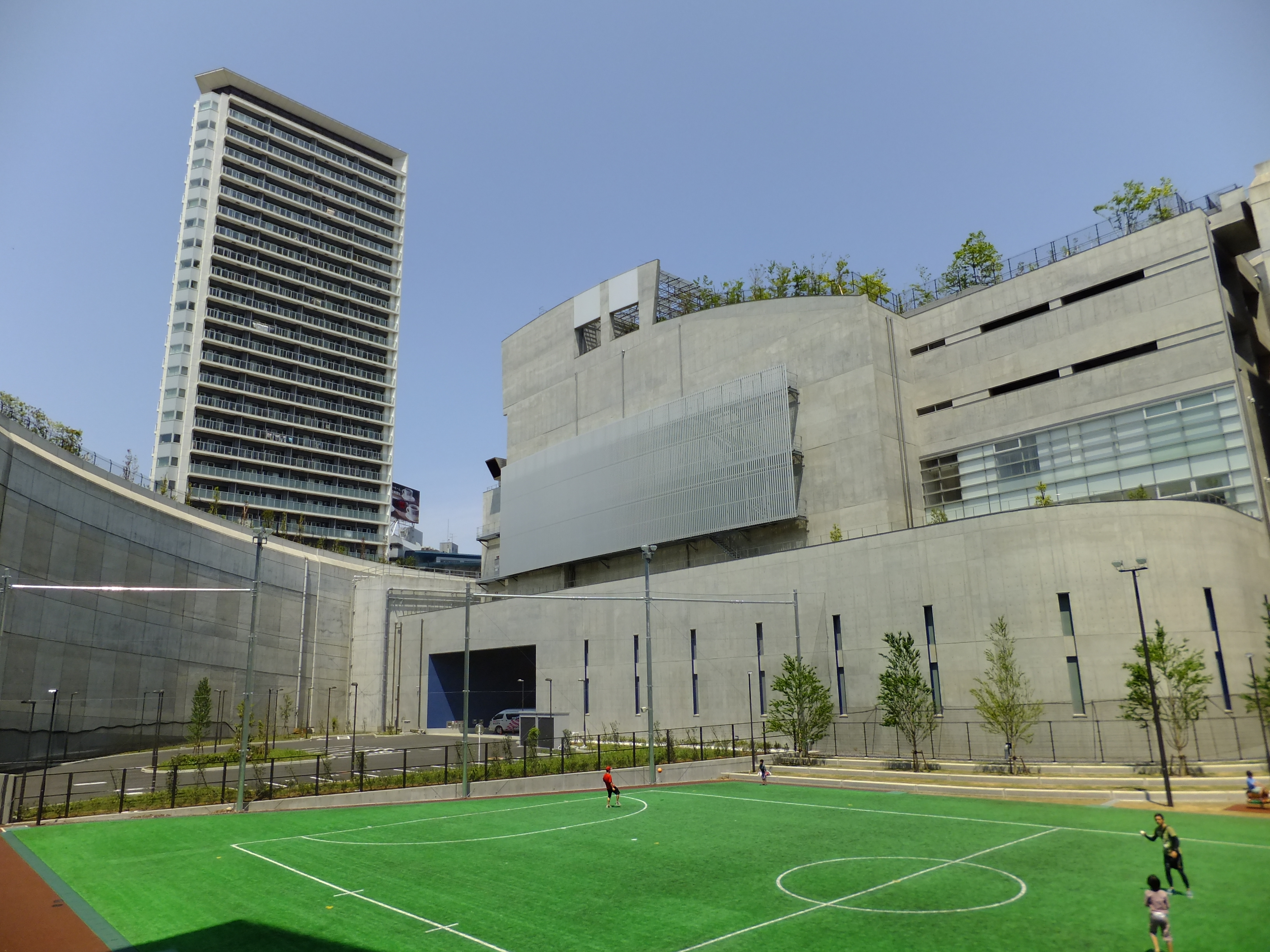
Sports ground located in the center of Ohashi Junction, 2013

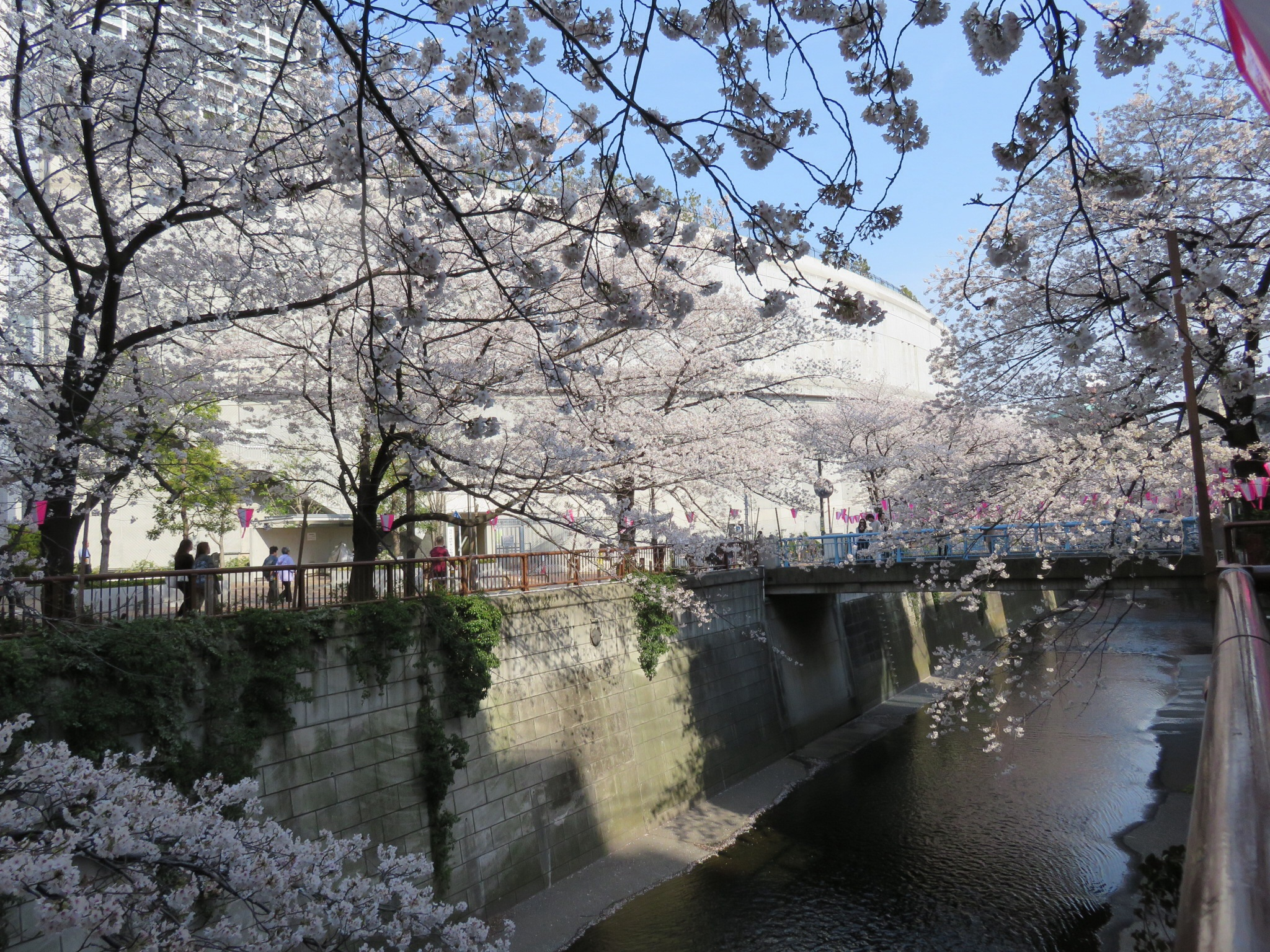
Exterior Wall of Ohashi Junction seen from the Meguro River, 2014

The project was planned and branded as the Ohashi "Green" Junction (大橋"グリーン"ジャンクション), integrating the expressway works with local redevelopment and public open space. Its concept emphasized "three greens": a roof park (Meguro Sky Garden) around the 400 m loop; greened townscape on the exterior walls using creeping fig; and a nature‑regeneration area on the roof of the ventilation station called the Ohashi village forest (おおはし里の杜).

Inside the loop a 3,000 m^{2} multi‑purpose lawn, Opus Yume Hiroba (オーパス夢ひろば), was created for community use.

The junction's stacked elliptical ramps connect the elevated Shibuya Route and the underground Central Circular Route across a height difference of about 70 m, with a loop length of about 400 m; the enclosing structure reduces noise and emissions impacts on the surrounding neighborhood.

The outer walls of Ōhashi Junction are almost the same size as the Colosseum. The outer wall design was inspired by the Colosseum, with decorative false windows and slits on its walls added to reduce the sense of oppression on the surrounding area. (Note: "これにより、 周辺への圧迫感を減少させ、都市景観との調和を図っている。")

== Impacts ==
Construction of the junction reduced the distance needed for motorists to travel between the two roads.

Construction forced residents to relocate from the junction site. The development was undertaken as an integrated development combining junction construction with a housing redevelopment project implemented by the Tokyo Metropolitan Government. (Note: "このような状況の中、建設敷地内にお 住まいの方の移転問題、地域分断、環境問題など地域に及ぼす様々な影響に対して、周辺地区の将来の 動向、長期的な視点からもまちづくりの必要性が高まり、ジャンクション建設と東京都施行の再開発事 業による一体的整備という例のない取組みが行われた。") The original residents were provided housing in these new buildings.

Approximately 38,000 square metres of land was redeveloped for the junction and two high rise buildings. The Meguro Ward Park built on the rooftop covers an area of approximately 7,000 square metres.

Analysis of data before and after the opening of the junction showed a decrease in nearby traffic speeds. Average traffic speeds at the Ikejiri Entrance to Ohashi Junction dropped from 66.53km/h in 2006 to 36.84km/h in 2010, with a larger variance. The analysis concluded that decrease in speed due to traffic convergence (i.e. induced demand) was the main contributing factor to congestion on Metropolitan Expressway Route No. 3.

Commentary accompanying the Japan Society of Civil Engineers prize described the sight of the four tube-like connecting viaducts and the Metropolitan Expressway Route 3 Shibuya Line elevated highway, interwoven with the main structure, as violent. (Note: "4本の筒状の連絡高架橋と首都高3号渋谷線の高架道路が本体構造物と織り交ぜて織りなす光景は、荒々しいが、爆発的なエネルギーを解き放つ都市のダイナミズムの表現として前向きに捉えたい。")

== Awards and recognition ==
The junction and rooftop park have received multiple national awards, including:

- 2013 Good Design Award (グッドデザイン賞) "Future Creation Design Award" (special award) for Ōhashi Junction (project by the Tokyo Metropolitan Government, Meguro City, and Metropolitan Expressway Co.).
- 2014 Japan Society of Civil Engineers Environment Prize (土木学会環境賞) for the completion of the Ohashi "Green" Junction (Metropolitan Expressway Co. and Meguro City).
- 2015 JSCE Design Prize (Excellence Award) (土木学会デザイン賞 優秀賞) for Ōhashi Junction.
- 2014 Urban Green Technology Contest (屋上・壁面・特殊緑化技術コンクール) (MLIT Minister's Award, roof‑greening category) for Meguro Sky Garden.
- 2015 JSCE Outstanding Civil Engineering Achievement Award (Technology Award) (土木学会 技術賞) for the Ohashi Ramp Tunnel works using an advanced tunnel enlargement method to join large shield tunnels without surface excavation.
