= Shinjuku Route =

Radial route of the Shuto Expressway

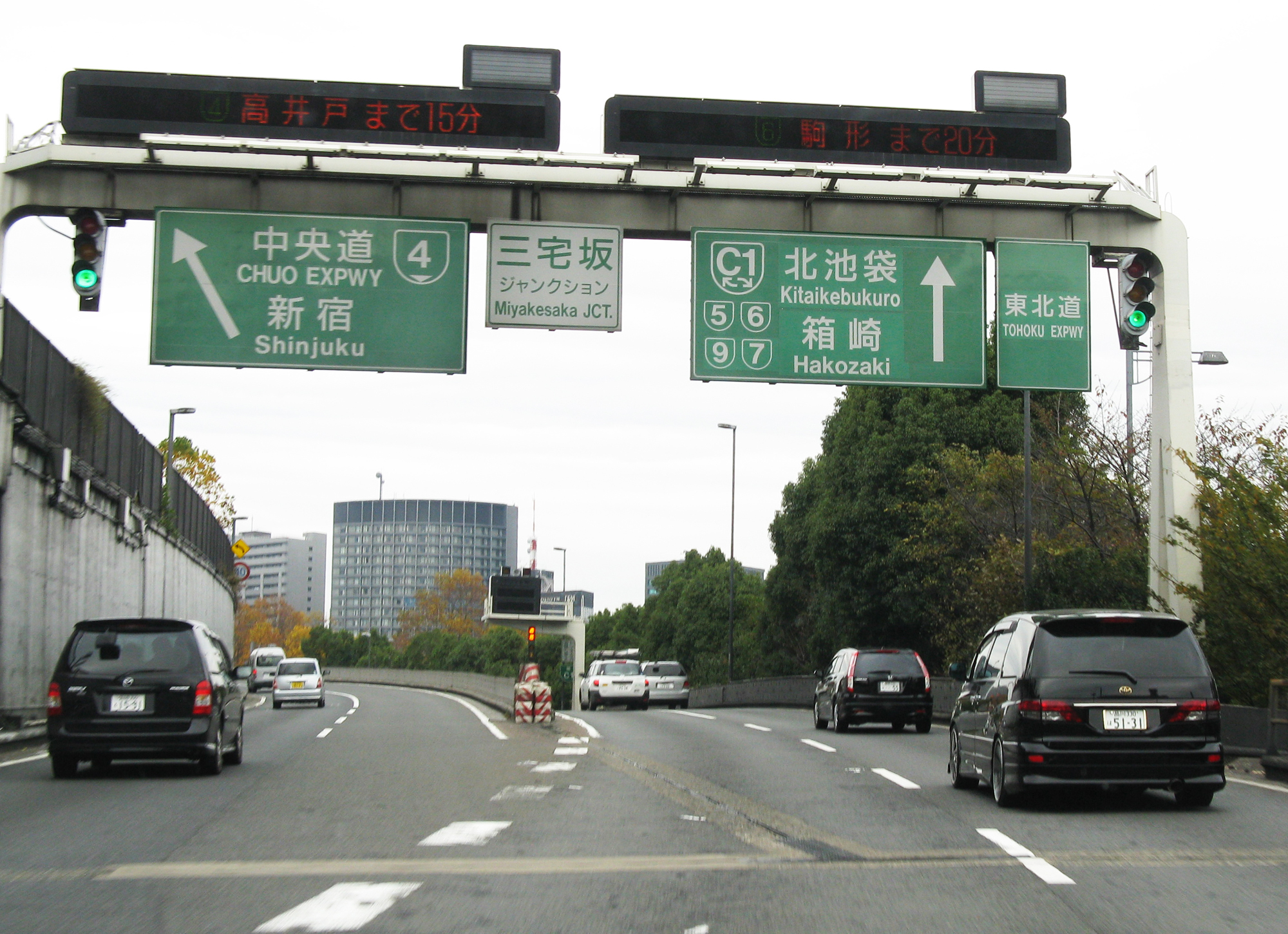
Miyakezaka JCT

Route 4 on a map of the Shuto Expressway system

The Shinjuku Route (新宿線, Shinjuku-sen), signed as Route 4 is one of the radial routes of the Shuto Expressway system in the Tokyo area. Route 4 runs west from Miyakezaka Junction (with the Inner Circular Route) in Chiyoda-ku and runs for 8.44 miles (13.5 km) through Shinjuku-ku, Shibuya-ku, and Suginami-ku. The Route 4 designation ends at the Takaido Interchange and the expressway continues as the intercity Chūō Expressway to Nagoya via Yamanashi and Nagano Prefecture.

== History ==
- August 2, 1964 - Miyakezaka Junction - Hatsudai Temporary Exit section opened
- August 15, 1973 - Eifuku Exit - Takaido Interchange section opened
- September 27, 1973 - Hatsudai Exit - Eihuku Exit section opened
- May 18, 1976 - Completing the entire route.

== Exit list ==
Municipality	Exit/interchange name	Destinations	Notes
Chiyoda-ku	Miyakezaka JCT	Route C1 Outer Loop to Ginza and Hakozaki; Route C1 Inner Loop to Meguro and Haneda	
Shinjuku-ku	Gaien	National Stadium of Japan, Meiji Jingu Stadium	
Shibuya-ku	Yoyogi	Meiji Jingu Shrine	Outbound exit/inbound entrance
Shinjuku-ku	Shinjuku	Shinjuku Station, Tokyo Metropolitan Government Office	No outbound entry ramp
Shinjuku-ku	Nishi-shinjuku JCT	Route C2 Outer Loop to Kumanocho JCT(Route 5). Route C2 Inner Loop to Ohashi JCT(Route 3) and Bayshore Route.	Outer Loop connected on Dec 22. 2007. Inner Loop connected in 2009).
Shibuya-ku	Hatsudai	National Route 20, also known as Kōshū Kaidō avenue	Inbound exit/outbound entrance
Shibuya-ku	Hatagaya	National Route 20	Outbound exit/inbound entrance
Suginami-ku	Eifuku	National Route 20	
Suginami-ku	Takaido	Kampachi-dori (Tokyo's #8 ring road)	No outbound entry rampway Road continues as Chūō Expressway
