= Japan National Route 246 =

Road in Japan

National Route 246
- 国道246号
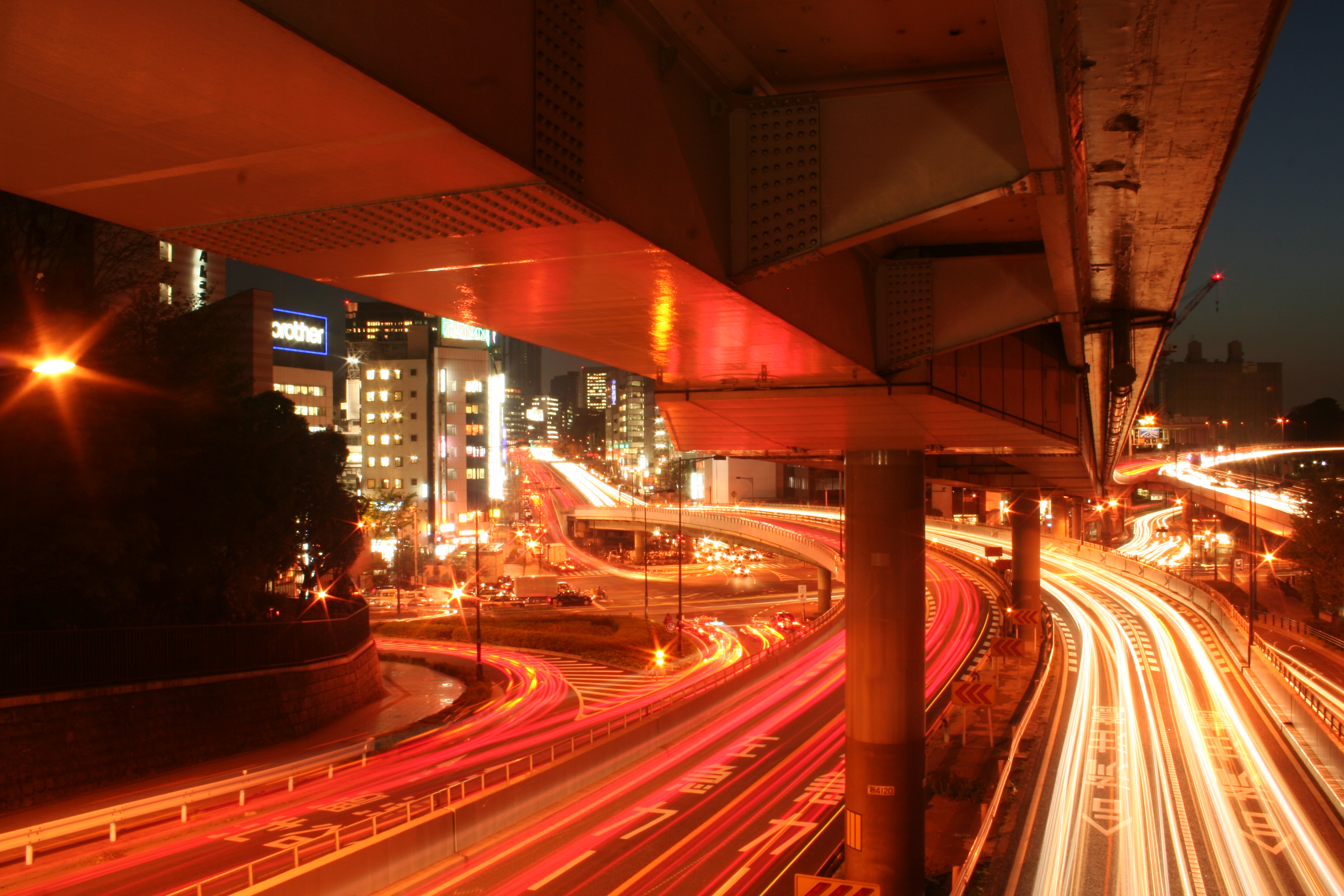

Route information
- Length: 125.3 km (77.9 mi)
- Existed: 10 July 1956–present

Major junctions
- North end: National Route 20 in Chiyoda, Tokyo
- South end: National Route 1 / National Route 414 in Numazu, Shizuoka

Location
- Country: Japan

Highway system
- National highways of Japan; Expressways of Japan
← National Route 245	→ National Route 247

Route 246 (国道246号, Kokudō 246-gō) is a major highway on the island of Honshū in Japan. It originates in Chiyoda, Tokyo and terminates in Numazu, Shizuoka. In and near Tokyo, it parallels the routes of the Dai-ichi Keihin, Dai-ni Keihin, and Tōmei Expressways, the Tōkyū Den-en-toshi Line, Odakyu Odawara Line, Gotemba Line, and other transportation systems.

Along its 125.3-kilometer-long (77.9 mi) course, National Route 246 passes from Chiyoda through Minato, Shibuya, Meguro, Setagaya in Tokyo (called Aoyama-dori (青山通り) or Tamagawa-dori (玉川通り) in part of this section), and into Kanagawa Prefecture, entering Kawasaki (Takatsu and Miyamae), Yokohama (Tsuzuki, Aoba and Midori), Machida (Tokyo), Yamato, Atsugi, Isehara, Matsuda and Yamakita (called Ō-yama-kaidō (大山街道) or Atsugi-kaidō (厚木街道) in part of this section). In Shizuoka Prefecture, it passes through Susono, Oyama, and Nagaizumi en route to its terminus in Numazu.

Part of the route – running through Shibuya and past the outer gardens of the Meiji Jingu – was recreated in Gran Turismo 3: A-Spec under the name Tokyo Route 246. The same track is also featured in subsequent games in the series up until Gran Turismo 6. The Nogizaka46 song "Route 246" is named after the route.

Municipality	Intersects with	Destinations / Stations	Notes
Chiyoda-ku	Route 20, 1, C1	Sakuradamon, Nagatacho, Diet Bldg, Imperial Palace	
Shibuya-ku	Route 3	Shibuya	Aoyama-dori. Usually faster than parallel Roppongi-dori
Shibuya-ku	Yamate-dori (317)		Here to Yoga has regular entrances for Route 3
Setagaya-ku	Setagaya-dori	Sangenjaya	
Setagaya-ku	Kannana-dori (318)		
Setagaya-ku	Tōmei	Yōga	
Setagaya-ku	Kampachi-dori (311/466)		
Setagaya-ku	Tama River	Futako Tamagawa	
Miyamae	45 for Tōmei and Daisan-Keihin		
Aoba		Eda Stn.	
Aoba	Tōmei		
Machida	Route 16		
Yamato	467 for Enoshima		Cuts through the center of Izumi no Mori, a nature park operated by the city of Yamato.
Atsugi	412 and 60 for Lake Okutama		
Atsugi	129, Tomei, Odawara Bypass		
Atsugi		Odakyu Aiko-Ishida Stn.	
Matsuda	255, Tomei	Odakyu Shin-Matsuda Stn., JR Higashi-Yamakita Stn.	
Gotemba	138 for Hakone		
Gotemba	23 for Mount Fuji		
Numazu	Route 1		
