= Shibuya Route =

Highway in Tokyo

Shuto Expressway Shibuya Route 首都高速3号渋谷線
- The Shibuya Route highlighted in red

Route information
- Part of AH1
- Maintained by Metropolitan Expressway Company Limited
- Length: 11.9 km (7.4 mi)
- Existed: 1964–present

Major junctions
- East end: Tanimachi Junction in Minato; Inner Circular Route
- Central Circular Route
- West end: Yōga entrance/exit in Setagaya; Tōmei Expressway

Location
- Country: Japan

Highway system
- National highways of Japan; Expressways of Japan

The Shibuya Route (渋谷線, Shibuya-sen), signed as Route 3 of the Shuto Expressway system and AH1 as a part of that route of the Asian Highway Network, is one of the radial routes of the tolled Shuto Expressway system in the Tokyo area. The 11.7-kilometer-long (7.3 mi) elevated expressway was planned as a part of Tokyo's post-war redevelopment before the 1964 Summer Olympics. As a radial route, it travels southwest from its eastern terminus at the Inner Circular Route, Tokyo's innermost ring road in Meguro, to the eastern terminus of the Tōmei Expressway in Setagaya.

== Route description ==
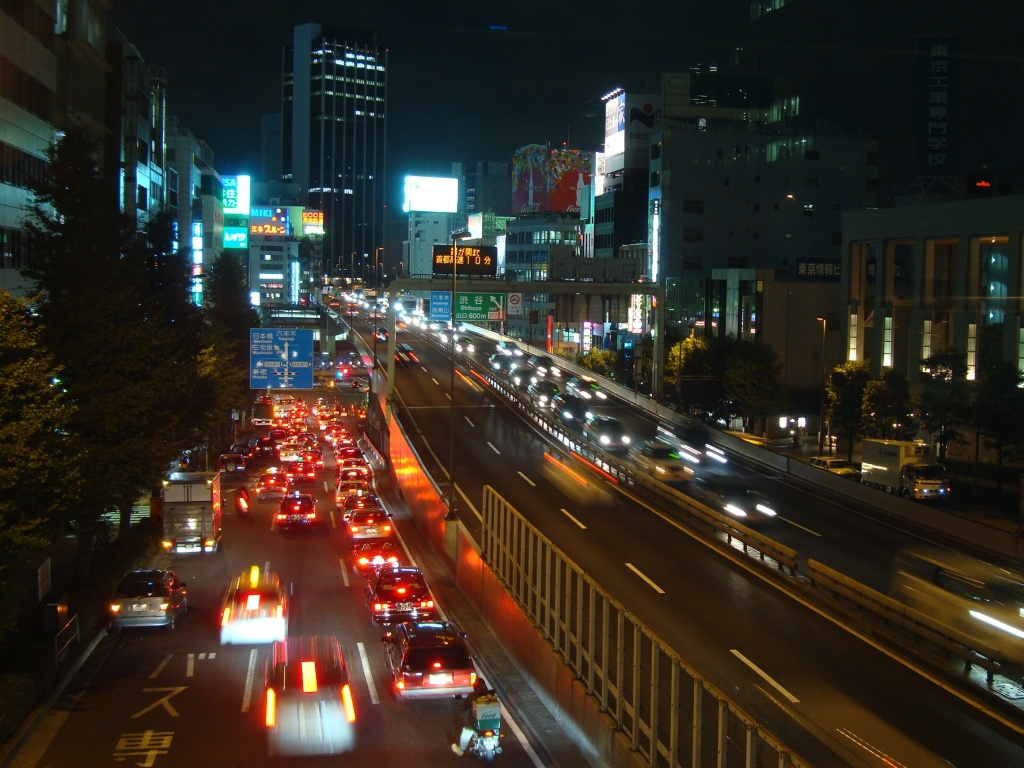
The Shibuya Route as seen in Shibuya.

The Shibuya Route runs southwest from Tanimachi Junction where it meets the Inner Circular Route, Tokyo's innermost beltway, in Minato. In all, it runs for 11.9 kilometers (7.4 mi) through the wards of Shibuya, Meguro, and Setagaya. The expressway, an elevated highway, is paralleled by various surface-level streets along its entire length, primarily National Route 246. Tokyu Corporation's commuter line, the Tōkyū Den-en-toshi Line, travels directly beneath the expressway from Ikejiri-Ōhashi Station to Komazawa-daigaku Station. The foundation of the supports for this section of the elevated expressway is the tunnel that carries the commuter line, so the tunnels are maintained jointly by the Metropolitan Expressway Company and the Tokyu Corporation.

At Takagichō the expressway curves to the west, passing to the south of Aoyama Gakuin University. The Shibuya curves to the southwest once again as it passes central Shibuya. Continuing southwest into Meguro, the expressway begins its run directly above the Tōkyū Den-en-toshi Line. Along this section, the expressway has a junction with the Central Circular Route at Ohashi Junction. The route then passes into Setagaya. In the ward the expressway has a junction with surface-level National Route 246. The Shibuya Route comes to an end at the Yōga entrance/exit where the expressway transitions to the intercity Tōmei Expressway managed by the Central Nippon Expressway Company. The Shibuya Route, along with the Tōmei Expressway and the Inner Circular Route at its ends, is included in the cross-continental Asian Highway 1 that runs from Tokyo to Istanbul.

== History ==
The first plans were laid out for the Shibuya Route on 18 August 1959 during the preparations for the 1964 Summer Olympics to be held in Tokyo. It was one of a network of eight expressway routes "designed to allow 60,000 vehicles travelling at 60kmper hour" planned to span Tokyo upon completion. The estimated cost for the entire project as laid out in 1959 was 105.8 billion yen (US$293,888,888) (equivalent to $2.41 billion in 2024 dollars).

Construction of the expressway route was initiated in 1962 in Shibuya 4 chome near Aoyama Gakuin University. The first section of the expressway to be opened to traffic was a section between Roppongi-dōri at Shibuya Interchange and Shibuya 4 chome in October 1964 in time for the beginning of the 1964 Olympics. The construction methods used on this elevated section of highway would later come under scrutiny after they were found to be the underlying cause of the collapse of the elevated Kobe Route in Kobe during the Great Hanshin earthquake of 1995. It was next extended to Tanimachi Junction from Shibuya 4 chome in September 1967. The rest of the expressway between Shibuya and the Tōmei Expressway was completed in December 1971.

Further developments to the expressway have been made since its completion, in 2003 the Shibuya Route was included as one of several highways in Japan that make up its section of Asian Highway 1. In March 2010, the expressway was linked to the Central Circular Route upon the completion of Ōhashi Junction. On 7 March 2015, Ōhashi Junction was expanded to carry traffic to and from the Shibuya Route and the newly opened section of the Central Circular Route to the south of Ōhashi Junction.

== Junction list ==
The entire expressway is in Tokyo.

Location	km	mi	Exit	Name	Destinations	Notes
Minato	0.0	0.0	—	Tanimachi	Inner Circular Route – to Bayshore Route, Haneda Route, Shinjuku Route, Ikebukuro Route, Ueno, Shiba Park, Saitama, Kasumigaseki, Kita-ikebukuro	Eastern terminus; eastern end of AH1 concurrency
Minato	1.9	1.2	301	Takagichō	Tokyo Metropolitan Route 412 (Roppongi-dōri) – to Aoyama-dōri, Ebisu, Shibuya Station	
Shibuya	3.4– 4.4	2.1– 2.7	302/303	Shibuya	Tokyo Metropolitan Route 412 (Roppongi-dōri) – Roppongi, Minamiaoyama; National Route 246 (Tamagawa-dōri) – Yamate-dōri, Meguro	
Meguro	5.2	3.2	—	Ōhashi	Central Circular Route – to Bayshore Route, Tōhoku Expressway	
Setagaya	5.8– 6.0	3.6– 3.7	304/305	Ikejiri/Sangenjaya	National Route 246 (Tamagawa-dōri) – Yamate-dōri, Meguro	
Setagaya	11.5	7.1	PA/TB	Yōga		Eastbound access to parking area and tollgate only
Setagaya	11.9	7.4	—	Yōga	Kampachi-dōri – Takaido, Todoroki; Tōmei Expressway – Shizuoka	Western terminus; expressway continues west as the Tōmei Expressway and AH1
1.000 mi = 1.609 km; 1.000 km = 0.621 mi: Incomplete access; Route transition

== Cultural references ==
The Shibuya Route figures in Haruki Murakami's dystopian fiction novel 1Q84. It is the setting of the novel's opening chapter. The elevated expressway has no shoulders, so turnouts at regular intervals provide places for drivers to park in case of an emergency. The turnouts are equipped with emergency stairways to the streets below. In the novel, one of these emergency stairways serves as a gateway to an alternate reality, a fictionalized version of 1984 that the main character, Aomame, is transported to.
