= Yashio, Tokyo =

Yashio 八潮
- District
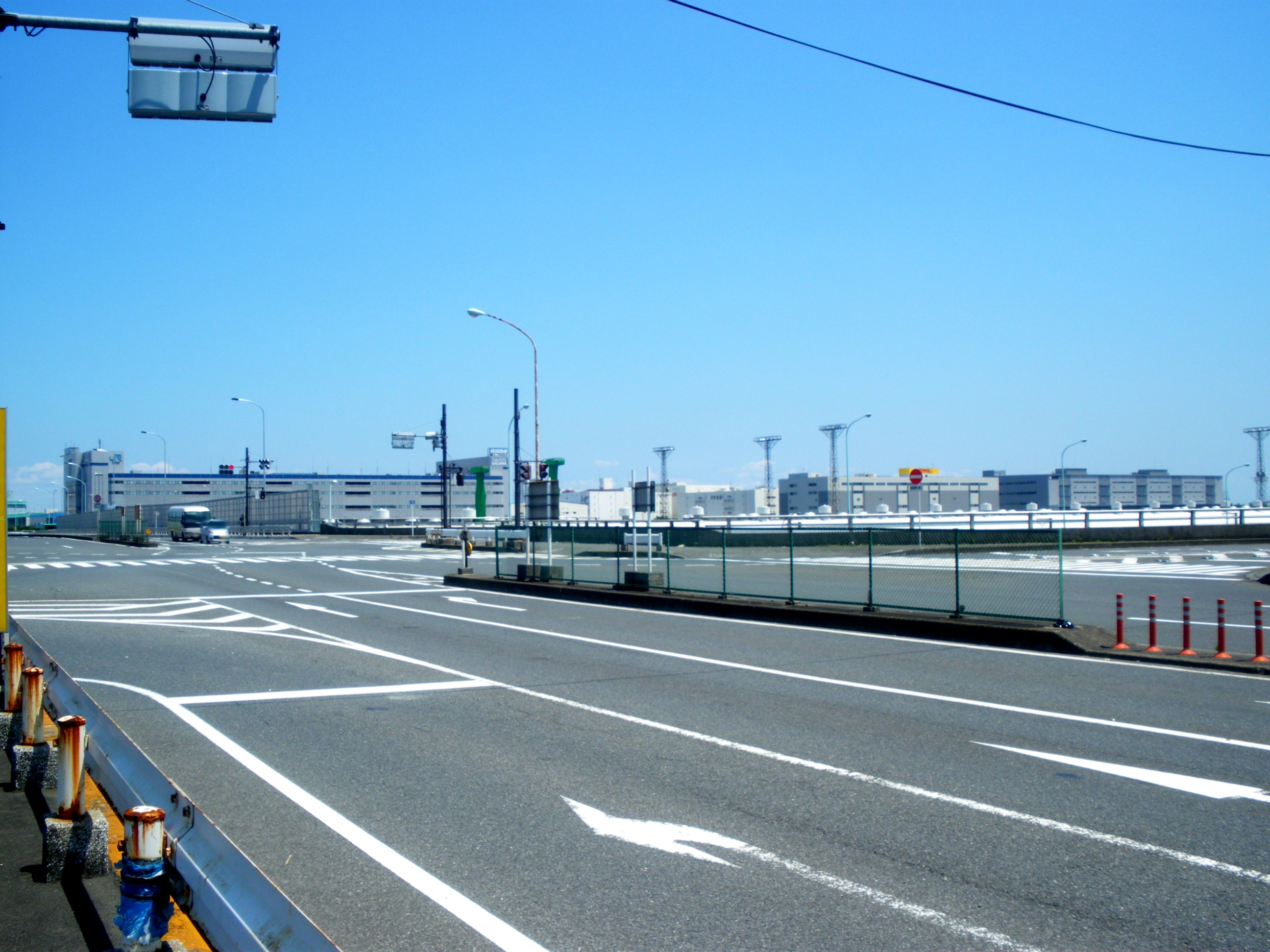

- Location of Yashio within Tokyo Location of Yashio within Tokyo Bay
- Coordinates: 35°36′0.53″N 139°45′4.72″E
- Country: Japan
- Region: Kantō
- Prefecture: Tokyo
- Ward: Shinagawa
- Established: -

Population (April 1, 2021)
  - Total: 11,668
- Time zone: UTC+9 (JST)
- Zip code: 140-0003
- Area code: 03

Yashio (八潮) is a district of Shinagawa, Tokyo, Japan. The current administrative place names are Yashio 1-chome to Yashio 5-chome. It is an area where the residential address has been displayed. It corresponds to the area on the north side of Ōi Wharf Part 1. The south side of Ōi Wharf 1 is Tokai, Ōta, Tokyo.

== Education ==
Shinagawa City Board of Education operates public elementary and junior high schools.

Yashio 1-3 chome are zoned to Jonan No. 2 Elementary School (城南第二小学校) and Tokai Junior High School (東海中学校). 4-5 chome are zoned to Yashio Gakuen (八潮学園) for both elementary and junior high school.
