= Shirako River =

Shirako River (白子川)
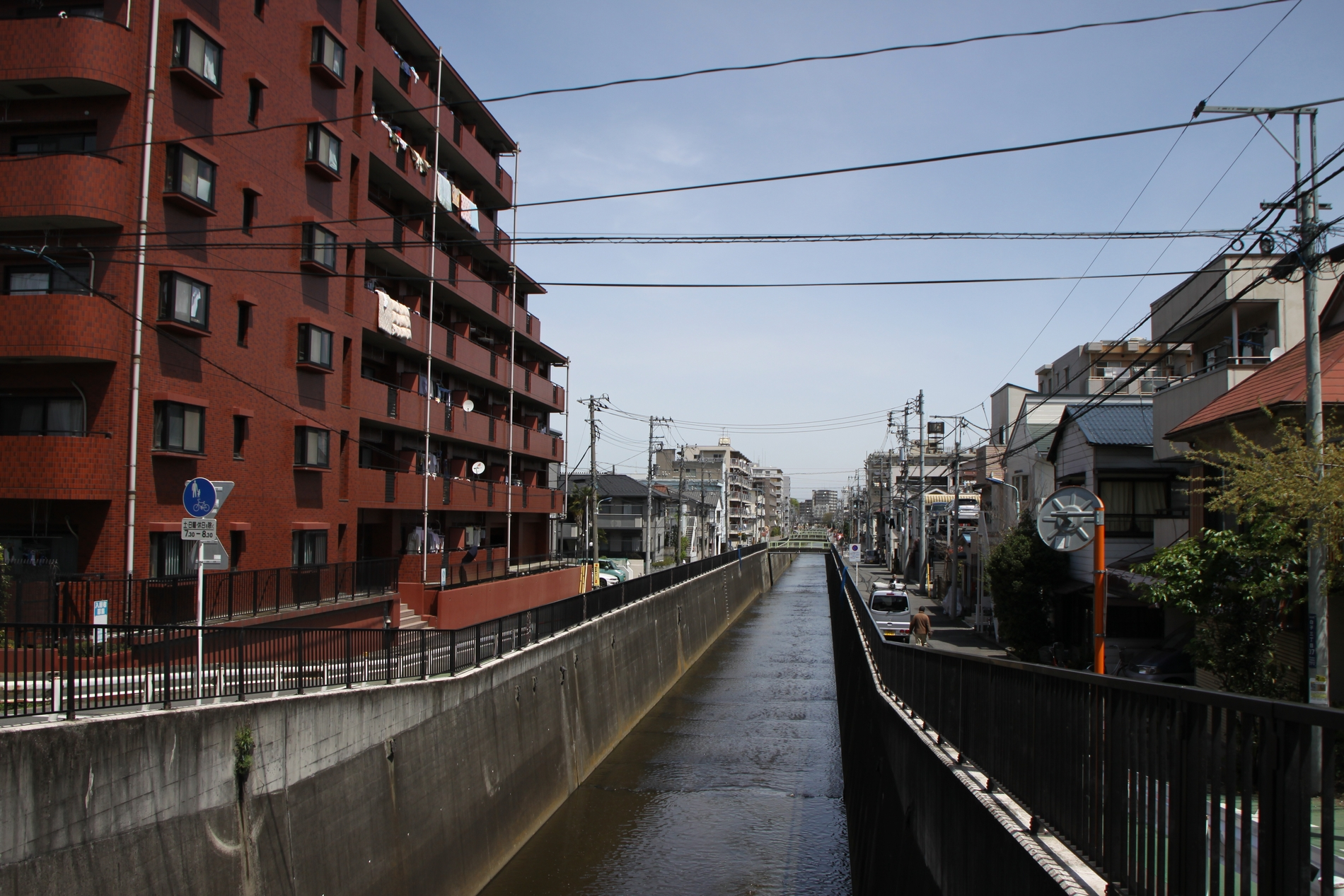
- Downstream from Teramaebashi Bridge in the city of Wakō.

Location
- Country: Japan

Physical characteristics
- Source
  - location: Ōizumi Igashira Park (Higashi-Ōizumi, Nerima Ward, Tokyo)
- Mouth
  - location: Shingashi River (Misono, Itabashi Ward, Tokyo)
  - coordinates: 35°47′52″N 139°38′29″E
- Length: 10.0 km (6.2 mi)
- Basin size: 25.0 km

The Shirako River (白子川, Shakujii-gawa) is a class A river that flows through Tokyo and Saitama Prefecture, serving as a tributary of the Shingashi River in the Arakawa river system.

== Geography ==
The river begins at the Ōizumi Igashira Park in the Higashi-Ōizumi neighborhood in Nerima Ward, Tokyo, and flows through the Nishi-Ōizumi, Ōizumi-Gakuenchō, Ōizumimachi, and Doshida neighborhoods in Nerima Ward, then through Minami, Shirako, and Shimo-Niikura in the city of Wakō in Saitama Prefecture, and the Narimasu neighborhood in Itabashi Ward, Tokyo, before joining the Shingashi River near Sasame Bridge in the Misono neighborhood in Itabashi Ward. Upstream from Igashira Park is a waterway under the city of Nishitokyo management called Shinkawa, which originates near the University of Tokyo Tanashi Forest and passes around the Hoya government office area, but is almost entirely covered and partially converted to pedestrian walkways. Along with the Yanase River and Kurome River, it is considered to be a remnant of the ancient Tama River, which flowed further northeast than its current course.

The former course of the Shirako River now forms the boundary between Tokyo and Saitama Prefecture.
