= Sakitama Bridge =

Bridge in Japan

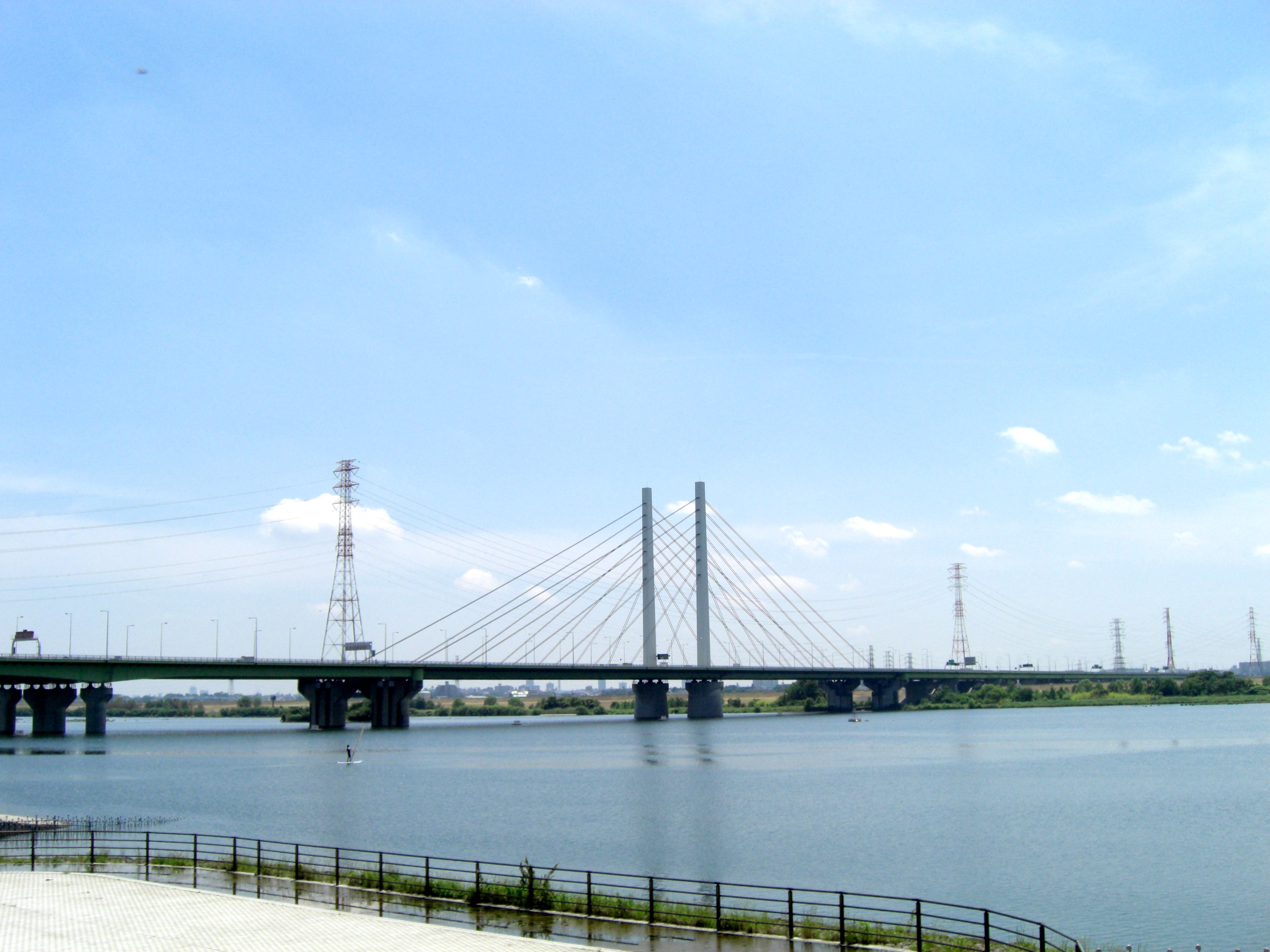
- Sakitama Bridge in June 2008.
- Coordinates: 35°48′30″N 139°37′33″E
- Crosses: Arakawa and Shingashi River

Characteristics
- Total length: 1485m
- Width: 55.4m
- Height: 80.0m

History
- Opened: 1992

Statistics
- Daily traffic: road

The Sakitama Bridge (幸魂大橋, Sakitamaōhashi) is a road bridge on Japan National Route 298 and the Tokyo Gaikan Expressway that spans the Arakawa/Shingashi River and the Arakawa Adjustment Pond (Ayako) between Bijogi, Toda and Niikura, Wakō in Saitama Prefecture. It is also known as Kotamabashi.
