= Saitama Shintoshin Route =

Road in Japan

Saitama Shintoshin Route

Route information
- Maintained by Metropolitan Expressway Company Limited
- Length: 5.8 km (3.6 mi)
- Existed: 2000–present

Major junctions
- West end: Yono Junction in Saitama; Ōmiya Route; National Route 16 / National Route 17
- East end: Saitama-minuma entrance/exit in Saitama; Saitama Prefecture Route 1

Location
- Country: Japan

Highway system
- National highways of Japan; Expressways of Japan

The Saitama Shintoshin Route (埼玉新都心線, Saitama Shintoshin-sen), signed as Route S2, is one of the five routes of the Shuto Expressway system serving the Greater Tokyo Area that are located within Saitama Prefecture. The 5.8-kilometer (3.6 mi) long radial highway runs east from Yono Junction in the western part of the city of Saitama to Saitama-minuma in the central part of the city. It primarily connects the central part of Saitama to the Ōmiya Route and, by extension, the Ikebukuro Route which connects it to the rest of the Shuto Expressway system and central Tokyo.

== Route description ==
Route S2 route begins at Yono Junction where it meets the Shin-Ōmiya Bypass, signed as National Routes 16 and 17, in western Saitama as a continuation east for the Ōmiya Route. The expressway is a limited-access road, but is a two-lane expressway with only one travel lane in each direction. From this western terminus, it travels east towards central Saitama. Route S2 meets its eastern terminus at Saitama-minuma where it has an intersection with Saitama Prefecture Route 1. Much of the Saitama Shintoshin Route is carried through tunnels below Ōmiya and Saitama-Shintoshin stations, only the sections near the termini of the route are not underground.

== Future ==
There are plans to extend the Saitama Shintoshin Route to the east from its current terminus at Saitama-minuma to a junction with the Tōhoku Expressway.

== History ==
The first section of the Saitama Shintoshin Route between the expressway's western terminus at Yono Junction and Shintoshin-nishi, was opened to traffic on 17 April 2000. The next section between Shintoshin-nishi and Shintoshin was opened on 26 May 2004 after delays caused by unstable soil made construction difficult. The final section of the expressway between Shintoshin and the eastern terminus at Saitama-minuma was opened on 4 August 2006.

== Junction list ==
The route lies entirely within Saitama Prefecture.

| Location | km | mi | Exit | Name | Destinations | Notes |
|---|---|---|---|---|---|---|
| Saitama | 0.0 | 0.0 | — | Yono | Ōmiya Route; National Route 16 / National Route 17 (Shin-Ōmiya Bypass) | Western terminus, expressway continues south as the Ōmiya Route; eastbound exit, westbound entrance |
| Saitama | 1.3 1.9 | 0.81 1.2 | S201/S202 | Shintoshin-nishi | Saitama Prefecture Route 56 – Ōmiya Station | |
| Saitama | 2.6 4.4 | 1.6 2.7 | S203/S204 | Shintoshin | Sangyo-dōro – Super Arena | |
| Saitama | 5.8 | 3.6 | S205 | Saitama-minuma | Saitama Prefecture Route 1 – Ageo, Kawaguchi | Eastern terminus; signaled at-grade junction |
1.000 mi = 1.609 km; 1.000 km = 0.621 mi: Route transition
