= Sakitama =

Sakitama may refer to:

- 6071 Sakitama, a Main-belt Asteroid discovered on 4 January 1992
- Saitama Prefectural Museum of the Sakitama Ancient Burial Mounds, a museum administrated by Saitama Prefecture and located in Gyōda, Saitama, Japan
- Sakitama, the debut single of the Japanese pop group Rin'
- Sakitama Bridge, a bridge on the Tokyo Gaikan Expressway in Japan
- Sakitama (埼玉), Gyōda was a village in Kitasaitama District, Saitama Prefecture, Japan
- Sakitama (埼玉), Nasushiobara, Tochigi Prefecture, Japan

== See also ==
- Saitama, a different reading of 埼玉
