= Ōizumimachi =

Coordinates: 35.7645°N 139.6021°E

Ōizumimachi (Japanese: 大泉町) is a district of Nerima, Tokyo, Japan. It consists of 1-chōme to 3-chōme.

It is best known for Ōizumi Junction and Ōizumi Interchange located in the district. Note that Ōizumimachi and Ōizumigakuenchō are completely different districts of Nerima.

== Geography ==
Ōizumimachi is located in the northwestern part of Nerima. It borders Wakō, Saitama on the north, Higashiōizumi on the south, Miharadai on the southeast, Doshida on the east, and Ōizumigakuenchō on the west.

== History ==
Ōizumimachi, Nerima, Tokyo roughly corresponds to former Hashido, Niikura District, Musashi (武蔵国新座郡橋戸村, Musashi-no-kuni Niikura-gun Hashido-mura). Its name was changed to Hashido, Kurehashi, Niikura District, Saitama (埼玉県新座郡榑橋村大字橋戸, Saitama-ken Niikura-gun Kurehashi-mura ōaza Hashido) in 1889, Hashido, Ōizumi, Kitatoshima District, Tokyo (東京府北豊島郡大泉村大字橋戸, Tokyo-fu Kitatoshima-gun Ōizumi-mura ōaza Hashido) in 1891, Kitaōizumimachi, Itabashi, Tokyo City, Tokyo (東京府東京市板橋区北大泉町, Tokyo-fu Tokyo-shi Itabashi-ku Kitaōizumimachi) in 1932, and Kitaōizumimachi, Nerima, Tokyo (東京都練馬区北大泉町, Tokyo-to Nerima-ku Kitaōizumimachi) in 1947.

In 1980, most part of Kitaōizumimachi and a portion of Ōizumigakuenchō were merged to become Ōizumimachi 1-chōme to 5-chōme. Finally in 1982, the rest of Kitaōizumimachi and a portion of Ōizumigakuenchō were merged to become Ōizumimachi 6-chōme.

== Education ==
Nerima City Board of Education operates public elementary and junior high schools.

3-chome and parts of 1 and 2-chome are zoned to Oizumi No. 1 Elementary School (大泉第一小学校). Parts of 1-chome are zoned to Yasaka Elementary School (八坂小学校). Other parts of 2-chome are zoned to Hashido Elementary School (橋戸小学校) and Senshin Elementary School (泉新小学校).

All of 1-chome and parts of 2 and 3-chome are zoned to Yasaka Junior High School (八坂中学校). The remainder of 2 and 3-chome are zoned to Oizumi Kita Junior High School (大泉北中学校).
