= Toda, Saitama =

Toda 戸田市
- City
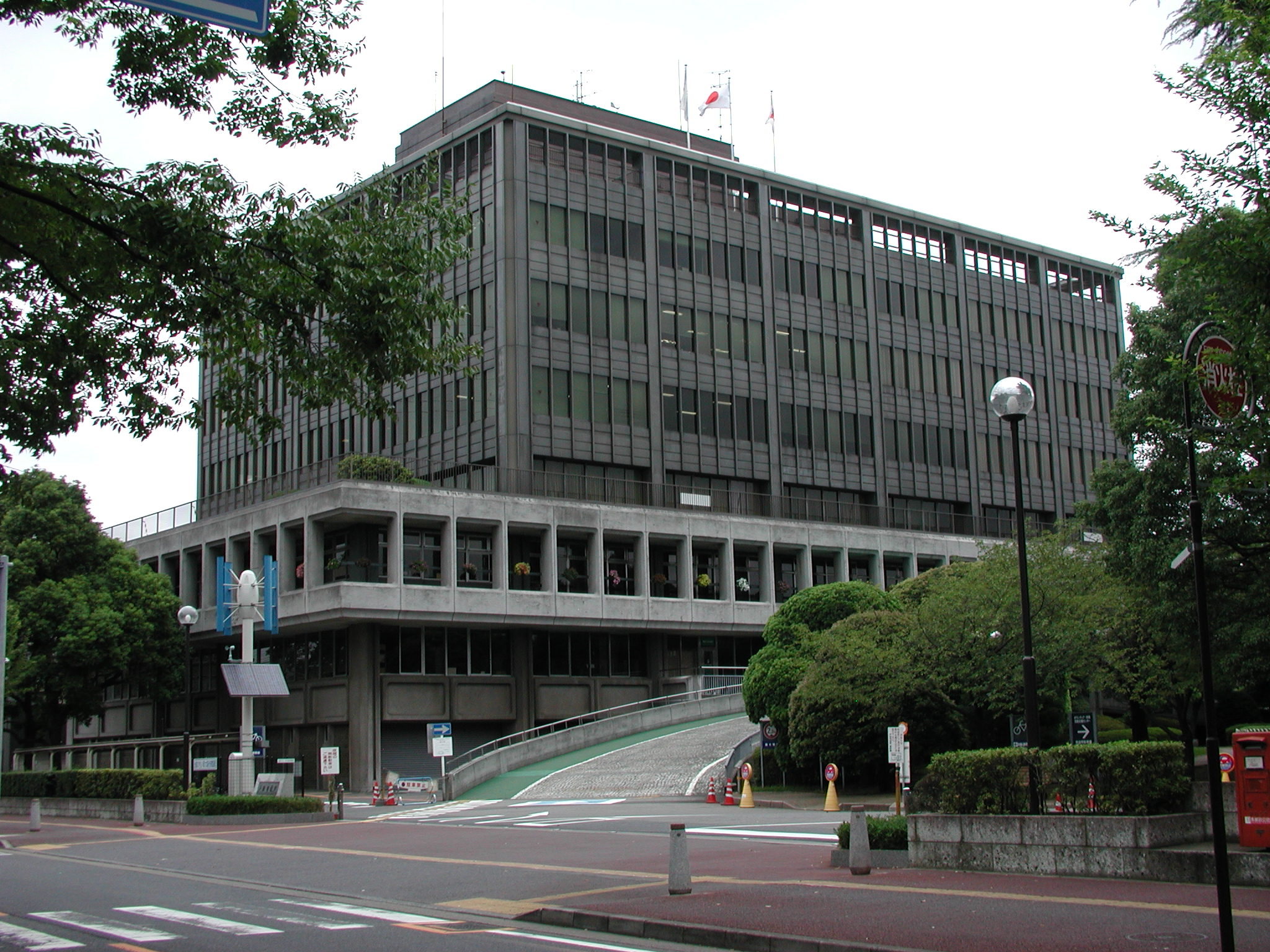
- Toda City Hall

- Flag Seal

- Location of Toda in Saitama Prefecture

- Location within Japan
- Coordinates: 35°49′3.4″N 139°40′40.5″E
- Country: Japan
- Region: Kantō
- Prefecture: Saitama

Government
  - Mayor: Fumihito Sugawara (from March 2018)

Area
  - Total: 18.19 km^{2} (7.02 sq mi)

Population (February 2021)
  - Total: 140,902
  - Density: 7,746/km^{2} (20,060/sq mi)
- Time zone: UTC+9 (Japan Standard Time)
- Tree: Osmanthus
- Flower: Primula sieboldii
- Phone number: 048-441-1800
- Address: 1-18-1 Kamitoda, Toda-shi, Saitama-ken 335-8588
- Website: Official website

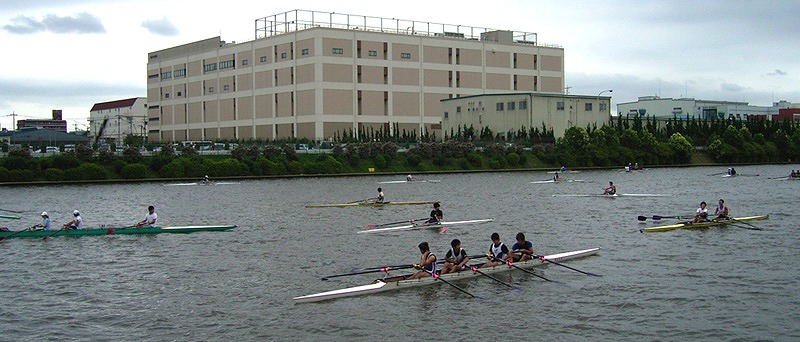
Toda Rowing Course

Toda (戸田市, Toda-shi) is a city located in Saitama Prefecture, Japan. As of 1 November 2025, the city had an estimated population of 142,715 in 70,998 households and a population density of 7,841 persons per km^{2}. The total area of the city is 18.19 square kilometres (7.02 sq mi).

== Geography ==
Toda is located in the flat lowlands of far southeastern Saitama Prefecture, separated from Tokyo by the Arakawa River. The Sasame River also flows through the city before joining the Arakawa.

=== Surrounding municipalities ===
- Saitama Prefecture
  - Asaka
  - Kawaguchi
  - Saitama (Minami-ku)
  - Wakō
  - Warabi
- Tokyo Metropolis
  - Itabashi
  - Kita

=== Climate ===
Toda has a humid subtropical climate (Köppen Cfa) characterized by warm summers and cool winters with light to no snowfall. The average annual temperature in Toda is 14.8 °C. The average annual rainfall is 1482 mm with September as the wettest month. The temperatures are highest on average in August, at around 26.6 °C, and lowest in January, at around 3.2 °C.

== Demographics ==
Per Japanese census data, the population of Toda has increased rapidly from the 1960s to the present day.

Historical population
Year	Pop.	±%
1960	30,752	—
1970	69,511	+126.0%
1980	78,435	+12.8%
1990	87,599	+11.7%
2000	108,039	+23.3%
2010	123,079	+13.9%
2020	140,899	+14.5%

== History ==
The villages of Niizo, Kamitoda and Shimotoda were created within Kitaadachi District, Saitama with the establishment of the modern municipalities system on April 1, 1889. The villages merged on June 1, 1941, to form the town of Toda. The town annexed the village of Misasa on July 20, 1957. The rowing competition of the 1964 Tokyo Olympics took place in Toda near to where the present day Toda-Koen Station is located. The rowing area which is adjacent to the Arakawa River is still in use today. Toda was elevated to city status on October 1, 1966.

== Government ==
Toda has a mayor-council form of government with a directly elected mayor and a unicameral city council of 26 members. Toda contributes two members to the Saitama Prefectural Assembly. In terms of national politics, the city is part of Saitama 15th district of the lower house of the Diet of Japan.

== Economy ==
Much of the residential and commercial development in Toda is due to its proximity to the city of Tokyo and the efficient commuter rail links available. This has enabled Toda to act as a bedroom community of Tokyo and is thus an apt location of residence for those who wish to work in the Tokyo Metropolis. There has been a continuous increase in population since the construction of the three Saikyo Line stations in the 1980s and this has had a positive effect on the economy and development of the city.

There are a significant number of transportation/logistics and printing-based enterprises in Toda. Large companies that have their headquarters in Toda-shi include Okazen Transportation (Haulage/Logistics), Khobho (IT services), Chiyoda (Food Manufacturing). Other large companies that have significant operations in Toda are Yamato Transportation, Meiji Dairy, Jomo, Mainichi Newspaper, Chunichi Newspaper, Mitsubishi Tanabe Pharma, Sanyo Electric, Japan Restaurant Enterprise, and Hayakawa Publishing.

== Education ==
Toda has 12 public elementary schools and six public middle schools operated by the city government, and two public high schools operated by the Saitama Prefectural Board of Education.

== Transportation ==
=== Railway ===
An arrangement of the Toda City song has been used as the departure melody for trains departing from the up platform (platform 1) of the three Saikyo Line stations in Toda since 1 August 2007.

JR East – Saikyo Line

- Toda-Kōen - Toda - Kita-Toda

=== Highway ===
- Tokyo Gaikan Expressway
- Shuto Expressway Ikebukuro Route
- Shuto Expressway Ōmiya Route
- National Route 17
- National Route 298

== Bus services ==
There are various bus services in the city. Most of the routes are run by Kokusai Kogyo bus company. In addition there is a distinctive low cost mini-bus service known as Toco. This stands for Toda Community bus. The Toco service serves routes within the city limits unlike the regular Kokusai Kogyo bus routes which usually bring commuters to and from train stations on the Saikyo and Keihin-Tohoku train lines.

Bus Routes	Departure	Destination
Nishi-Kawa 61	Nishi-Kawaguchi sta.	Shimo-Sasame
Nishi-Kawa 62	Nishi-Kawaguchi	Kita-Toda sta.
Warabi 50–2	Warabi sta.	Toda Shako
Warabi 54	Warabi sta.	Shimo-Sasame
Warabi 55	Warabi sta.	Toda-Koen sta.
Warabi 80	Warabi sta.	Toda Shako
Warabi 81	Warabi sta.	Toda Shako
Narimasu 14	Shimo-Sasame.	Narimasu sta.
Minami-Ura 01	Minami-Urawa sta.	Aeon Kita-Toda S.C.
Minami-Ura 06	Musashi-Urawa sta.	Shimo-Sasame.
Minami-Ura 07	Minami-Urawa sta.	Toda Shako
Minami-Ura 80	Minami-Urawa sta.	Toda Shako
Minami-Ura 84	Minami-Urawa sta.	Toda Shako
Musashi-Ura 01	Musashi-Urawa sta.	Shimo-Sasame
Musashi-Ura 80	Musashi-Urawa sta.	Toda Shako
Kawa 50	Kawaguchi sta.	Kawaguchi sta.
Kawa 52	Kawaguchi sta.	Shimo-Sasame
To 52	Toda-Koen sta.	Shimo-Sasame

Community Bus (Toco) Routes	Departure	Main stops
Eastern Circuit	Toda-Koen sta.	Toda City hall, Toda Welfare Center
Western Circuit	Shimo-Sasame	Toda-Koen sta., Toda sta., Library/museum
Misasa Circuit	Shimo-Sasame	Sasame community center, Kita-Toda Sta
Nansai Circuit	Shimo-Sasame	Toda-Koen sta.

== Sister cities ==
- Liverpool, New South Wales, Australia, since October 1, 1992
- Kaifeng, Henan, China, friendship city since August 21, 1984

== Local attractions ==
- Toda Rowing Course

== Notable people from Toda ==
- Yui Hasegawa, professional association football/soccer player
- Kotono Mitsuishi, voice actress
- Tomoya Ugajin, professional association football/soccer player
- Natsuna Watanabe, actress
