= Ikebukuro Route =

Expressway in the Tokyo area

Ikebukuro Route

Route information
- Maintained by Metropolitan Expressway Company Limited
- Length: 21.5 km (13.4 mi)
- Existed: 1967–present

Major junctions
- South end: Takebashi Junction in Chiyoda, Tokyo; Inner Circular Route (Shuto Expressway)
- National Route 254; Central Circular Route
- North end: Bijogi Junction in Toda, Saitama; Tokyo Gaikan Expressway; Ōmiya Route

Location
- Country: Japan

Highway system
- National highways of Japan; Expressways of Japan

The Ikebukuro Route (池袋線, Ikebukuro-sen), signed as Route 5, is one of the tolled routes of the Shuto Expressway system serving the Greater Tokyo Area. The route is a 21.5-kilometer (13.4 mi) long radial highway running north from Chiyoda City to Toda, Saitama. It connects Tokyo's Inner Circular Route in central Tokyo to the Tokyo Gaikan Expressway where it continues north as the Ōmiya Route.

== Route description ==
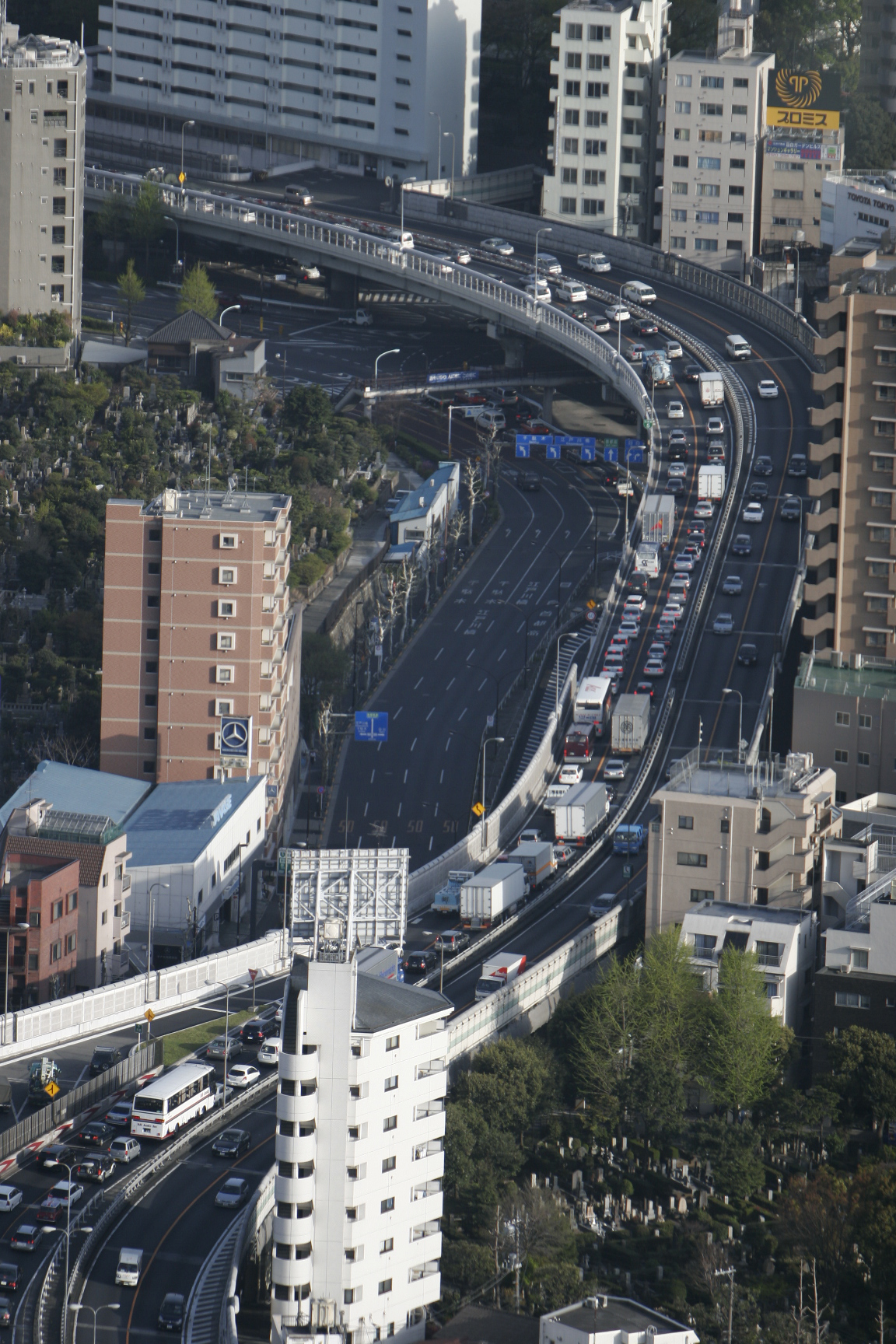
Ikebukuro Route at Gokokuji Interchange in Bunkyō.

The Ikebukuro Route begins at Takebashi Junction with the Inner Circular Route in Chiyoda City just north of the Tokyo Imperial Palace. From there it travels northwest through Shinjuku, Bunkyō, Toshima, and Itabashi in Tokyo before crossing over the Arakawa River into Toda in Saitama Prefecture where the Ikebukuro Route ends at Bijogi Junction where it intersects the Tokyo Gaikan Expressway. The expressway continues northward as the Ōmiya Route to Ōmiya-ku.

The speed limit on the Ikebukuro Route is set at 60 km/h.

== History ==
The Ikebukuro Route was first opened in March 1967 between Nishi-kanda and the expressway's southern terminus at Takebashi Junction. It was extended to its current length in phases completed in 1969, 1977, 1990, and 1993.

In preparation for increased congestion during the 2020 Summer Olympics, a new traffic-control system was installed in July 2019 along the expressway at the interchanges at Kita-Ikebukuro, Nishi-Kanda, Gokokuji, Nakadai, Takashimadaira, Toda-minami, Higashi-Ikebukuro, and Iidabashi.

== Junction list ==
Prefecture	Location	km	mi	Exit	Name	Destinations	Notes
Tokyo	Chiyoda	0.0	0.0	—	Takebashi	Inner Circular Route – Kandabashi, Kasumigaseki, Tōmei Expressway, Chūō Expressway	Southern terminus
Tokyo	Chiyoda	0.1	0.062	27	Hitotsubashi	Tokyo Metropolitan Route 401 (Hakusan-dōri)	Southbound exit, northbound entrance
Tokyo	Chiyoda	0.6	0.37	501	Nishi-kanda	Sendai-dōri – Jinbōchō, Iidabashi	Southbound entrance, northbound exit
Tokyo	Shinjuku	2.2	1.4	502	Iidabashi	Tokyo Metropolitan Route 8 (Chiyoda-Nerima-Tanashi Route); Tokyo Metropolitan Route 405 (Sotobori-Kanjō Route) – Kudan, Ichigaya, Suidōbashi	Southbound exit, northbound entrance
Tokyo	Shinjuku	3.4	2.1	503	Waseda	Gaienhigashi-dōri; Tokyo Metropolitan Route 8 (Chiyoda-Nerima-Tanashi Route) – Takadanobaba, Edogawabashi	Northbound exit only
Tokyo	Bunkyō	4.5	2.8	505	Gokokuji	Tokyo Metropolitan Route 437 (Shinobazu-dōri); Tokyo Metropolitan Route 435 (Otowa-Ikebukuro Route)	Southbound entrance, northbound exit
Tokyo	Toshima	5.0	3.1		Minami-Ikebukuro PA		Southbound only
Tokyo	Toshima	5.9– 6.2	3.7– 3.9	507, 508	Higashi-Ikebukuro	Sunshine City	
Tokyo	Toshima	7.5	4.7	509	Kita-Ikebukuro	National Route 254 (Kawagoekaidō); Tokyo Metropolitan Route 317 (Yamate-dōri)	Southbound entrance, northbound exit
Tokyo	Itabashi	7.8	4.8	—	Kumanochō	Central Circular Route – Tōmei Expressway, Chūō Expressway, Tōhoku Expressway	Southbound exit, northbound entrance; southern end of C2 concurrency
Tokyo	Itabashi	8.9	5.5	—	Itabashi	Central Circular Route – Tōmei Expressway, Chūō Expressway, Tōhoku Expressway, Jōban Expressway, Higashi-Kantō Expressway	Northern end of C2 concurrency
Tokyo	Itabashi	9.5– 10.5	5.9– 6.5	511, 512	Itabashihonchō	Nakasendō; Tokyo Metropolitan Route 318 (Kannana-dōri)	
Tokyo	Itabashi				Shimura PA / TB		Parking area is for southbound traffic only
Tokyo	Itabashi	12.9	8.0	513	Nakadai	Tokyo Metropolitan Route 311 (Kanpachi-dōri)	Southbound exit, northbound entrance
Tokyo	Itabashi	18.0	11.2	515	Takashimadaira	National Route 17 (Shin-Ōmiya Bypass); Tokyo Metropolitan Route 447 (Takashima-dōri)	Southbound entrance, northbound exit
Saitama	Toda	18.8– 21.0	11.7– 13.0	517, 518	Toda / Toda-minami	National Route 17 (Shin-Ōmiya Bypass)	
Saitama	Toda	21.0	13.0	—	Bijogi	Tokyo Gaikan Expressway; Ōmiya Route – Ōizumi, Kan-etsu Expressway, Misato, Tōhoku Expressway, Jōban Expressway	Northern terminus; expressway continues as the Ōmiya Route
1.000 mi = 1.609 km; 1.000 km = 0.621 mi: Concurrency terminus; Incomplete access; Route transition
