= Ōmiya Route =

Expressway in the Greater Tokyo area

Ōmiya Route

Route information
- Maintained by Metropolitan Expressway Company Limited
- Length: 8.2 km (5.1 mi)
- Existed: 1998–present

Major junctions
- South end: Bijogi Junction in Toda; Tokyo Gaikan Expressway; Ikebukuro Route
- North end: Yono Junction in Saitama; Saitama Shintoshin Route; National Route 17

Location
- Country: Japan

Highway system
- National highways of Japan; Expressways of Japan

The Ōmiya Route (大宮線, Ōmiya-sen), signed as Route S5, is one of the five routes of the Shuto Expressway system serving the Greater Tokyo Area that are located within Saitama Prefecture. The 8.2-kilometer (5.1 mi) long radial highway runs north from Bijogi Junction in Toda to Yono Junction in the city of Saitama. It primarily connects the northwestern part of Tokyo and the Tokyo Gaikan Expressway to Saitama and the Saitama Shintoshin Route which serves the central part of that city.

== Route description ==
Route S5 begins at Bijogi Junction with the Tokyo Gaikan Expressway in Toda as a continuation north for the Ikebukuro Route. From this southern terminus, it travels northwest out of Toda, crossing in to the southwestern part of the city of Saitama. Route S5 meets its northern terminus at Yono Junction where it intersects Japan National Routes 16 and 17 one last time and then continues on as the Saitama Shintoshin Route eastward towards the central part of the city of Saitama.

The expressway is paralleled by the Shin-Ōmiya Bypass, a highway signed as National Route 17 which serves as a frontage road to the expressway. Due to this, all of the interchanges along the expressway, aside from the one at its southern terminus at Bijogi Junction, have incomplete access since drivers can continue along the frontage road and eventually find an entry point to the expressway.

The speed limit is set at 80 km/h along the entire route.

== History ==
The entirety of the Ōmiya Route was opened to traffic on 18 May 1998.

In preparation for increased congestion during the 2020 Summer Olympics, new traffic-control systems were installed along many expressways in the Tokyo area. The only instance of further controls being installed along the expressway was at its northern terminus at Yono Junction

== Junction list ==
The route lies entirely within Saitama Prefecture.

Location	km	mi	Exit	Name	Destinations	Notes
Toda	0.0	0.0	—	Bijogi	Tokyo Gaikan Expressway – Misato, Ōizumi; Ikebukuro Route – Ikebukuro, Ginza	Southern terminus, expressway continues as Ikebukuro Route; signaled intersection; C3 exit 60
Saitama	1.5	0.93	S551	Urawa-minami	National Route 17 (Shin-Ōmiya Bypass) – Urawa Station, Tokorozawa	Northbound exit, southbound entrance
Saitama	5.7	3.5	S554	Urawa-kita	National Route 17 (Shin-Ōmiya Bypass) – Urawa Station, Tokorozawa	Northbound entrance, southbound exit
Saitama	7.8	4.8	S555	Yono	National Route 16 (Shin-Ōmiya Bypass) / National Route 17	Northbound exit, southbound entrance
Saitama	7.8	4.8	—	Yono	Saitama Shintoshin Route – Ōmiya Station	Northbound exit, southbound entrance
Saitama	1.000 mi = 1.609 km; 1.000 km = 0.621 mi: Incomplete access; Route transition					
