= Minami-Ōizumi =

Minami-Ōizumi 南大泉
- Neighborhood (町丁)
- Location of Minami-Ōizumi within the Wards Area of Tokyo
- Coordinates: 35°44′41″N 139°34′22″E
- Country: Japan
- Region: Kantō
- Metropolis: Tokyo
- Ward: Nerima
- Time zone: UTC+9 (JST)
- Zip code: 178-0064
- Area code: 03

Minami-Ōizumi (南大泉) is a neighborhood of Nerima Ward in Tokyo, Japan. It consists of 6 chōme, or Streets. As of January 1, 2008, the district has a population of 25,969.

== Geography ==
Minami-Ōizumi is located in the western portion of Nerima. It borders the neighborhoods Nishi-Ōizumi on the north, Higashi-Ōizumi (across the Shirako River) on the east, Shakujiidai and Sekimachi-Kita on the south. To the west, it borders with the city of Nishitōkyō, and its neighborhoods Fujimachi, Nakamachi, Higashichō and Shimo-Hōya.
