= Deep underground (Japanese law) =

Deep underground (大深度地下, dai-shindo chika) is a Japanese concept for the public use of deep underground, enabled by a 2001 law. It was first thought of in the late 1980s as Japan faced ever-increasing land values in the economic bubble, to allow the use of heretofore-unused deep underground for necessary water and utility ducts and other city tunnels.

However, due to technical difficulties in ventilation, emergency procedures and other safety-related issues and the relatively high cost, no projects using deep underground have been completed as of 2010.

== Definition ==
- Depth greater than 40 meters or
- Depth 10 meters greater than the layer on which deep foundation rests

In the case of public use, no compensation to the land owner is required.

== Projects using the law ==
- Underground water mains in Kobe (Chūō-ku, Kobe)
  - Project approved on June 19, 2007 (first ever in Japan).
- Tokyo Gaikan Expressway (Tōmei Junction - Ōizumi Junction/Interchange)
  - Project status elevated to construction stage on April 27, 2009.

== Projects anticipated to use the law ==
- Capacity expansion of Chūō Main Line (extension of Keiyō Line from Tokyo Station to Mitaka Station)
- Extension of Tsukuba Express from Akihabara Station to Tokyo Station
- Chūō Shinkansen (a total of 100 km of deep underground track in Tokyo, Nagoya and Osaka areas)
- Hanshin Expressway Route 2 Yodogawa-Sagan Line third phase (extension from Toyosaki, Kita-ku, Osaka to Hiejima, Kadoma)
