= Nishi-Ōizumi =

District of Nerima, Tokyo, Japan

Nishiōizumi (西大泉) is a district of Nerima, Tokyo, Japan. It consists of 1-chōme to 6-chōme. As of January 1, 2008, the district has a population of 21,508.

== Geography ==
Nishiōizumi is located in the northwestern part of Nerima. It borders Ōizumigakuenchō on the east; Higashiōizumi and Minamiōizumi on the south; Shimohōya and Kitachō of Nishitōkyō on the west; and Nodera and Katayama of Niiza, Saitama on the north. Note that Nishiōizumimachi, an enclave district located in Katayama 3-chōme, Niiza, is administratively regarded as a different district from Nishiōizumi.
