= Saitama =

Saitama (埼玉, さいたま) may refer to:

- Saitama Prefecture, a prefecture of Japan
  - Saitama (city), the capital of Saitama Prefecture
- Saitama (One-Punch Man), title character of One-Punch Man
- Saitama SC, a football club
- 5618 Saitama, a main-belt asteroid

== See also ==
- Sakitama (disambiguation), a different reading of 埼玉
