= Kan-Etsu Tunnel =

Tunnel on the Kan-Etsu Expressway, Japan

Kan-Etsu Tunnel 関越トンネル
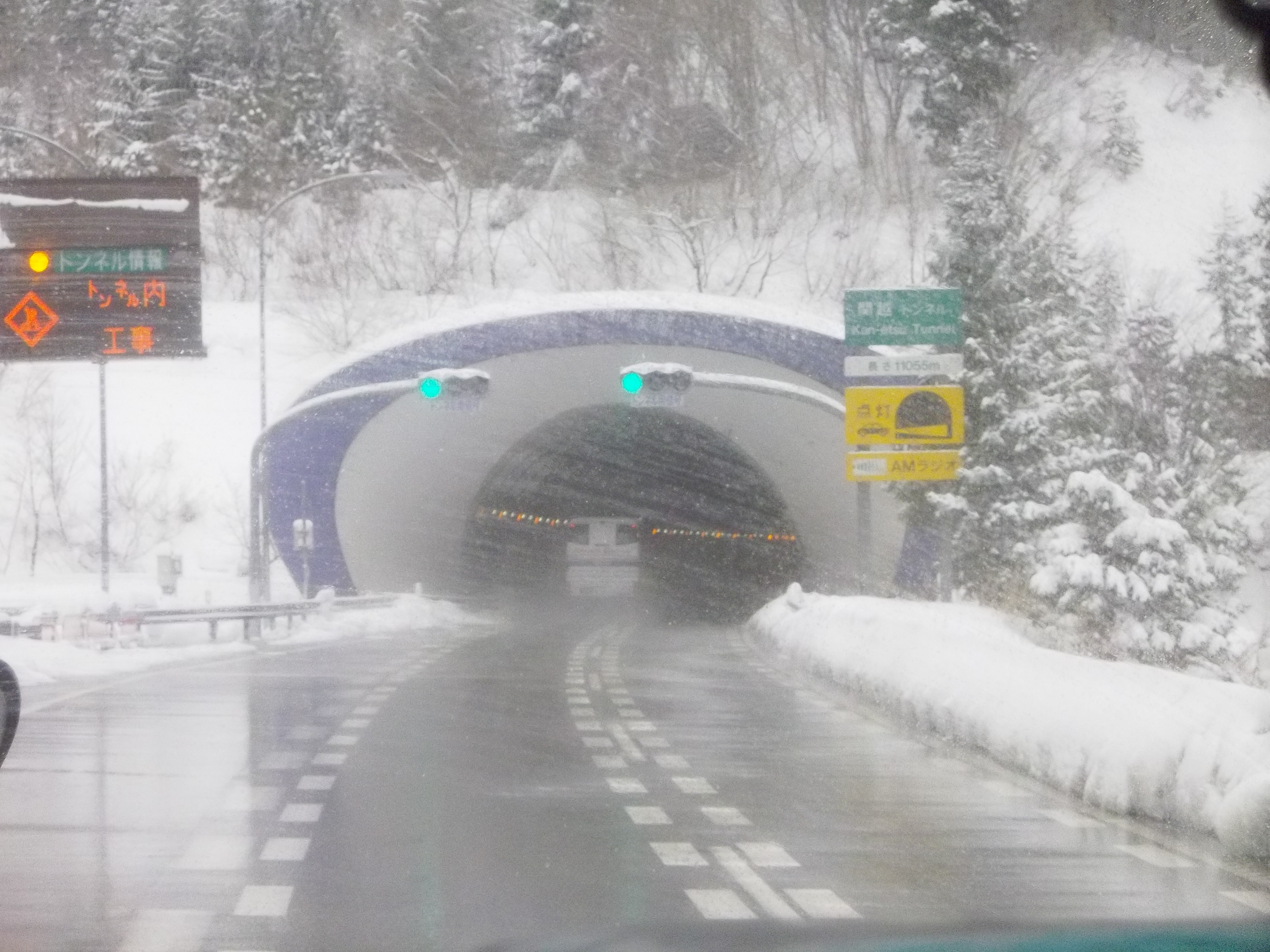
- Nagaoka-bound tunnel entrance at the Yuzawa side
- Interactive map of Kan-Etsu Tunnel 関越トンネル

Overview
- Location: Gunma and Niigata prefectures
- Route: Kan-Etsu Expressway
- Start: Minakami, Gunma (36.7802°N 138.9389°E)
- End: Yuzawa, Niigata (36.8657°N 138.8759°E)

Technical
- Length: 10.926 kilometres (6.789 mi) (Tokyo-bound); 11.055 kilometres (6.869 mi) (Nagaoka-bound)

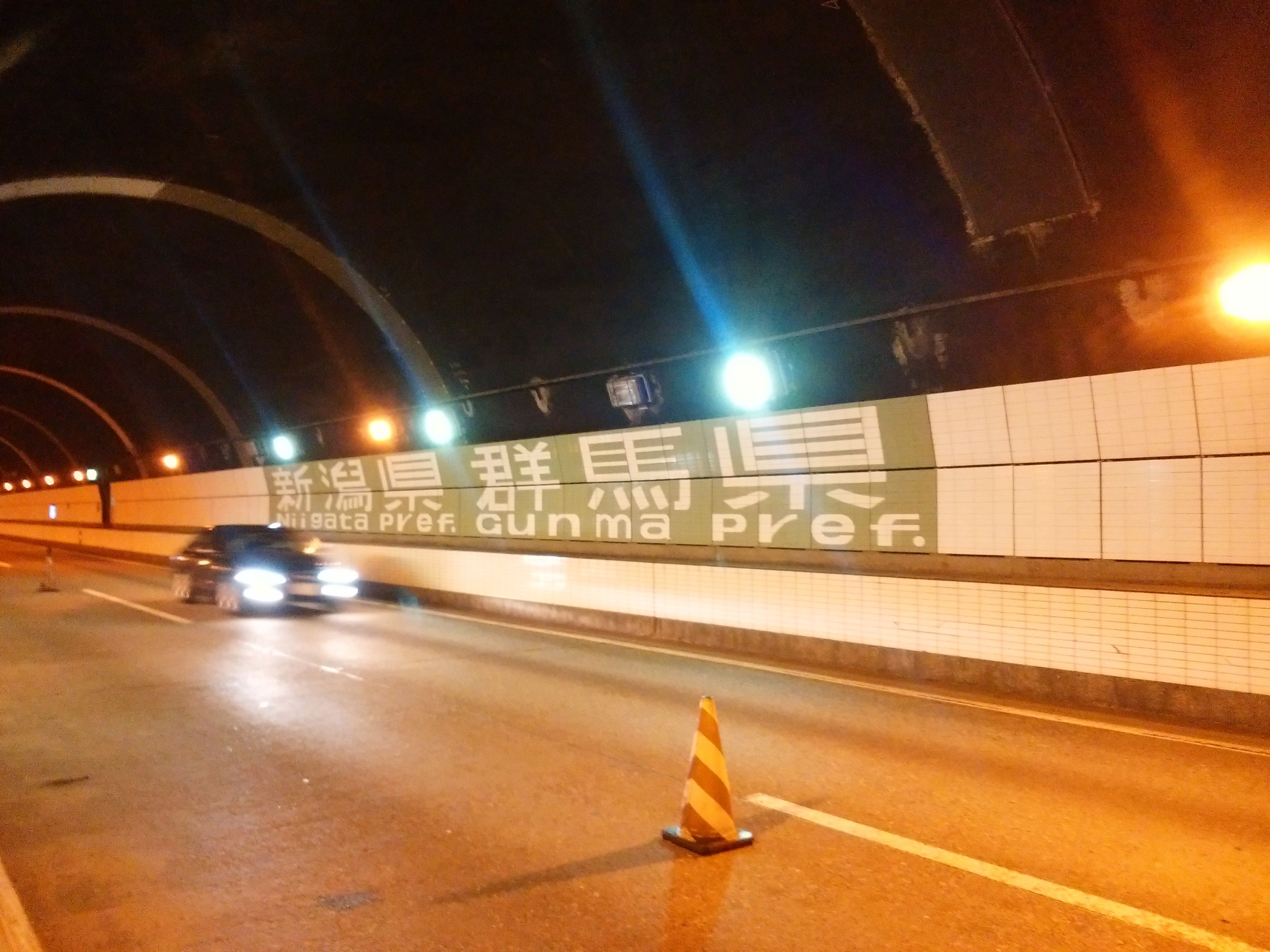
Prefectural border in the tunnel

The Kan-Etsu Tunnel (関越トンネル, Kan'etsu Tonneru) is a tunnel on the Kan-Etsu Expressway in Japan that runs through Mt. Tanigawa from Minakami, Gunma to Yuzawa, Niigata. The northern tube was opened in 1985 and the southern tube was opened in 1991. The older one is used as a tunnel towards Niigata and the newer is towards Gunma.
