= Nerima Interchange =

Road interchange in Nerima, Tokyo, Japan

- Interactive map of Nerima Interchange

Location
- 2-chōme Miharadai, Nerima, Tokyo
- Coordinates: 35°45′18″N 139°36′23″E
- Roads at junction: Kan-etsu Expressway

Construction

Nerima Interchange (練馬インターチェンジ, Nerima-Intāchenji) is a road interchange located in Nerima, Tokyo, Japan.

== Expressway ==
- East Nippon Expressway Company
  - Kan-etsu Expressway

== Adjacent Interchanges ==
←	Service	→
East Expressway Company
Kan-Etsu Expressway
Terminus	-	Ōizumi Junction
