= Higashi-Ōizumi =

Neighborhood in Nerima Ward, Tokyo

Higashi-Ōizumi 東大泉
- Neighborhood (町丁)
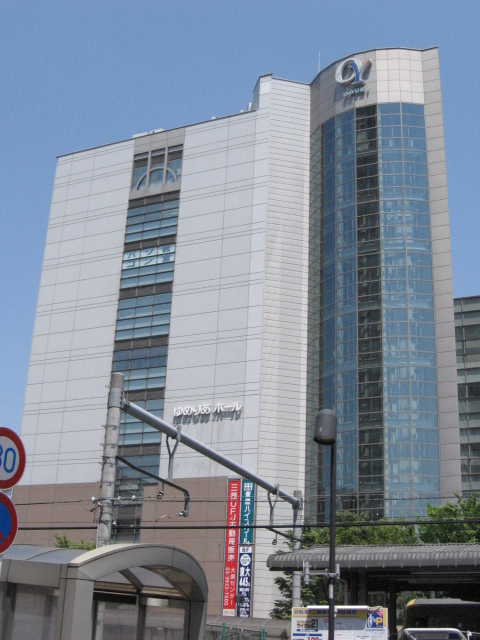
- Yumeria Hall

- Location of Higashi-Ōizumi within the Wards Area of Tokyo
- Coordinates: 35°44′58″N 139°35′12″E
- Country: Japan
- Region: Kantō
- Metropolis: Tokyo
- Ward: Nerima

Area
  - Total: 2.433 km^{2} (0.939 sq mi)

Population (March 1, 2007)
  - Total: 32,634
- Time zone: UTC+9 (JST)
- Zip code: 178-0063
- Area code: 03

Higashi-Ōizumi (東大泉) is a neighborhood of Nerima Ward, Tokyo, Japan, consisting of 1st Street to 7th Street (chōme). The neighborhood has an area of 2.433 km² as of October 10, 2005, and a population of 32,634 as of March 1, 2007. Its postal code is 178-0063.

Located in the western part of Nerima Ward, Higashi-Ōizumi borders Ōizumimachi, Ōizumi-Gakuenchō and Nishi-Ōizumi on the north, Shakujiidai on the south, Miharadai and Shakujiimachi on the east, and Minamiōizumi on the west.

Ōizumi-gakuen Station is situated in this district, around which a commercial and industrial neighborhood has flourished. On the other hand, Higashiōizumi 3-chōme and other areas nearby are known as well-designed, upper-class residential neighborhoods with a number of large stately homes.
