= Kan-etsu Expressway =

National expressway in Japan

Kan-Etsu Expressway
- 関越自動車道

Route information
- Length: 246.3 km (153.0 mi)
- Existed: 1971–present

Major junctions
- From: Tokyo Metropolitan Route 24; Nerima Interchange in Nerima, Tokyo
- To: Hokuriku Expressway; Nagaoka Junction in Nagaoka, Niigata

Location
- Country: Japan
- Major cities: Kawagoe, Fujioka, Takasaki, Maebashi, Ojiya

Highway system
- National highways of Japan; Expressways of Japan

The Kan-Etsu Expressway (関越自動車道, Kan'etsu Jidōsha-dō) is a national expressway in Japan. It is owned and managed by East Nippon Expressway Company.

== Naming ==
Kan-Etsu (関越) is the kanji acronym of Kantō (関東) and the old Echigo Province (越後国) comprising modern-day Niigata Prefecture.

Officially, the Kan-Etsu consists of two routes. Both begin in Tokyo and end in Niigata Prefecture. The Kan-Etsu Expressway Niigata Route consists of the entire Kan-Etsu Expressway from Nerima to Nagaoka, as well as the Hokuriku Expressway beyond Nagaoka to its terminus in the city of Niigata. The Kan-Etsu Expressway Jōetsu Route is concurrent with the Niigata Route until Fujioka Junction, where it branches off as the Jōshin-etsu Expressway and traverses Nagano Prefecture to its terminus in Jōetsu, Niigata.

== Route description ==
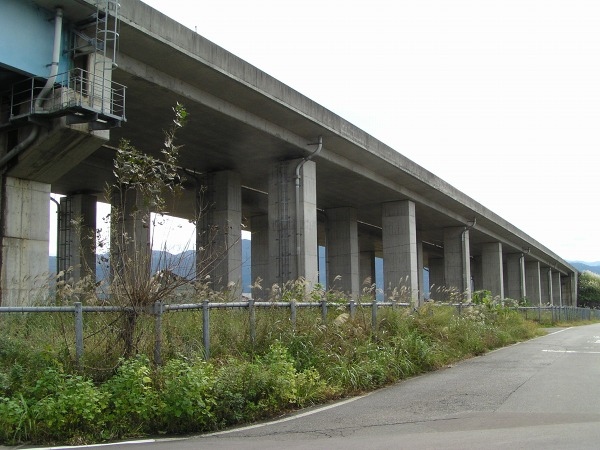
Kan-Etsu Expressway in Minamiuonuma

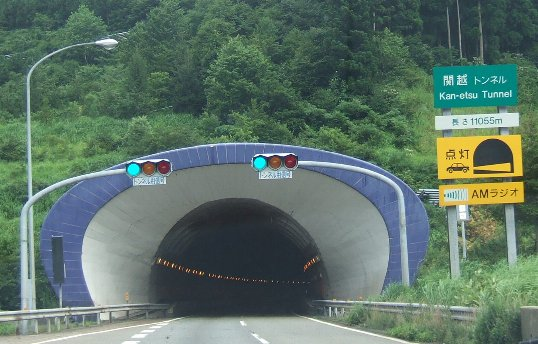
Kan-Etsu Tunnel

The expressway begins in Nerima Ward in the north of Tokyo; the Kan-etsu is the only national expressway linking Tokyo that does not have a direct connection with the urban Shuto Expressway network. A junction with the Tokyo Gaikan Expressway near the origin links the Kan-etsu with other expressways serving northern parts of the Tokyo urban area. From here the expressway follows a roughly northwesterly course to its terminus in Niigata Prefecture, passing through central areas of Saitama Prefecture and Gunma Prefecture. In Gunma the Kan-etsu Expressway provides access to Nagano Prefecture by way of the Jōshin-etsu Expressway at Fujioka Junction, and the completion of the Kita-Kantō Expressway in 2011 facilitated access to Tochigi Prefecture and Ibaraki Prefecture. The mountainous area separating Gunma and Niigata Prefectures is traversed by the Kan-Etsu Tunnel, the second longest road tunnel in Japan. The expressway then passes through southern Niigata Prefecture before terminating at a junction with the Hokuriku Expressway in Nagaoka. The route is six lanes from Ōizumi Junction to Shibukawa-Ikaho Interchange, and all other sections are four lanes. The expressway parallels National Route 17 and the Jōetsu Shinkansen of East Japan Railway Company for most of its length.

== History ==
The first section opened in 1971 and the entire route was opened to traffic in 1985.

On the night of 16 December 2020, about 1,000 vehicles were trapped on the expressway after a trailer blocked it off due to it becoming stuck in the snow. In response, the company that manages the route supplied drivers who were stuck on the road until the next morning. The Japan Ground Self-Defense Force was also deployed to the expressway to aid in the distribution of supplies to the stranded drivers.

In December 2025, a crash involving 50 vehicles in snowy conditions killed 2 people.

== List of interchanges and features ==
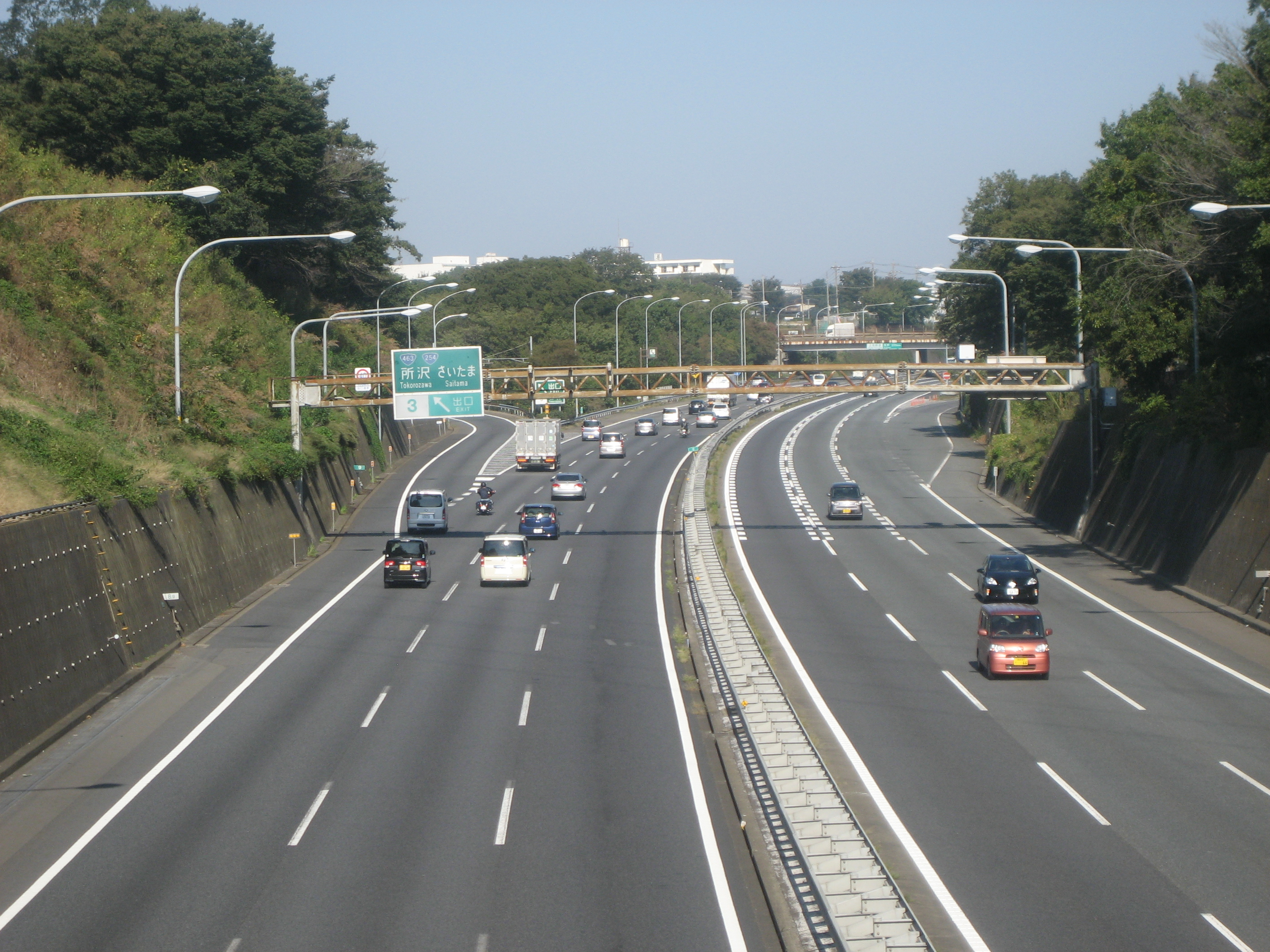
Tokorozawa IC

- IC - interchange, SIC - smart interchange, JCT - junction, SA - service area, PA - parking area, TB - toll gate, BS - bus stop, CB - snow chains, TN - tunnel, BR - bridge

No.	Name	Connections	Dist. from origin	Dist. from terminus	Bus stop	Notes	Speed limit	Location	
1	Nerima IC	Met. Route 24 (Nerima Tokorozawa Route / Mejiro Dōri)	0.0	246.2			80 km/h	Nerima	Tokyo
2	Ōizumi JCT	Tokyo Gaikan Expressway	0.8	245.0		IC entrance: Nagaoka-bound only	80 km/h	Nerima	Tokyo
2	Ōizumi IC	Met. Route 24 (Nerima Tokorozawa Route / Mejiro Dōri)	0.8	245.0		IC entrance: Nagaoka-bound only	80 km/h	Nerima	Tokyo
TB	Niiza Toll Gate		↓	↑			80 km/h	Niiza	Saitama
TB	Niiza Toll Gate		↓	↑			100 km/h	Niiza	Saitama
3	Tokorozawa IC	National Route 463 (Urawa Tokorozawa Bypass)	9.4	237.6			100 km/h	Tokorozawa	Saitama
PA	Miyoshi PA/ SIC		13.9	233.1			100 km/h	Miyoshi	Saitama
4	Kawagoe IC	National Route 16	21.2	225.9			100 km/h	Kawagoe	Saitama
BS	Kawagoe- Matoba BS		↓	↑	○		100 km/h	Kawagoe	Saitama
4-1	Tsurugashima JCT	Ken-Ō Expressway	27.8	219.3			100 km/h	Tsurugashima	Saitama
5	Tsurugashima IC	National Route 407	29.6	217.5			100 km/h	Tsurugashima	Saitama
5-1	Sakado-Nishi SIC	Pref. Route 39 (Kawagoe Sakado Moroyama Route)	32.5	214.6			100 km/h	Sakado	Saitama
SA	Takasaka SA		34.7	212.4			100 km/h	Higashi- matsuyama	Saitama
6	Higashi- matsuyama IC	National Route 254; Pref. Route 47 (Fukaya Higashimatsuyama Route)	39.4	207.7			100 km/h	Higashi- matsuyama	Saitama
6-1	Ranzan-Ogawa IC	Pref. Route 11 (Kumagaya Ogawa Chichibu Route)	47.4	199.7			100 km/h	Ranzan	Saitama
PA	Ranzan PA		50.1	197.0			100 km/h	Ranzan	Saitama
7	Hanazono IC	National Route 140	56.1	191.0			100 km/h	Fukaya	Saitama
7-1 PA	Yorii PA		63.4	183.7		SIC: Nagaoka-bound only	100 km/h	Fukaya/ Yorii	Saitama
8	Honjō-Kodama IC	National Route 462	69.6	177.5			100 km/h	Honjō	Saitama
8-1 SA	Kamisato SA/ SIC		75.5	170.6			100 km/h	Kamisato	Saitama
9	Fujioka JCT	Jōshin-etsu Expressway	78.6	167.5			100 km/h	Fujioka	Gunma
9-1	Takasaki-Tamamura SIC	National Route 354 (Takasaki-Tamamura Bypass)	82.7	163.4			100 km/h	Takasaki	Gunma
9-2	Takasaki JCT	Kita-Kantō Expressway	84.6	161.5			100 km/h	Takasaki	Gunma
10	Takasaki IC	Pref. Route 27 (Takasaki Komagata Route)	87.0	159.1			100 km/h	Takasaki	Gunma
11	Maebashi IC	National Route 17	92.1	154.0			100 km/h	Takasaki/ Maebashi	Gunma
11-1 PA	Komayose PA/ SIC		98.5	147.6			100 km/h	Yoshioka	Gunma
12	Shibukawa-Ikaho IC	National Route 17 (Shibukawa Bypass)	103.4	142.7			100 km/h	Shibukawa	Gunma
12	Shibukawa-Ikaho IC	National Route 17 (Shibukawa Bypass)	103.4	142.7			80 km/h	Shibukawa	Gunma
BR	No.1 Tonegawa Bridge		↓	↑		Length: 784 m	80 km/h	Shibukawa	Gunma
CB	Miharada CB		↓	↑		Nerima-bound only	80 km/h	Shibukawa	Gunma
12-1/ PA	Akagi IC/PA	Pref. Route 70 (Ōmama Kamishiroi Route)	111.2	134.9			80 km/h	Shibukawa	Gunma
SA	Akagi-kōgen SA		118.5	127.6			80 km/h	Shōwa	Gunma
12-2	Showa IC	Pref. Route 65 (Shōwa Inter Route)	120.6	125.5			80 km/h	Shōwa	Gunma
13	Numata IC	National Route 120	125.8	120.3			80 km/h	Numata	Gunma
CB	Numata CB		↓	↑		Nagaoka-bound only	80 km/h	Numata	Gunma
14	Tsukiyono IC	National Route 17	131.1	115.0			80 km/h	Minakami	Gunma
PA	Shimomoku PA		135.5	110.6			80 km/h	Minakami	Gunma
BR	Ōmine Bridge		↓	↑		Length: 784 m	80 km/h	Minakami	Gunma
15	Minakami IC	National Route 291	141.0	105.1			80 km/h	Minakami	Gunma
PA	Tanigawadake PA		146.0	100.1			80 km/h	Minakami	Gunma
TN	Kan-Etsu Tunnel		↓	↑		Nerima-bound 11,055 m Nagaoka-bound 10,926 m	70 km/h	Minakami	Gunma
TN	Kan-Etsu Tunnel		↓	↑		Nerima-bound 11,055 m Nagaoka-bound 10,926 m	70 km/h	Yuzawa	Niigata
PA	Tsuchitaru PA		157.5	88.6			80 km/h	Yuzawa	Niigata
16	Yuzawa IC	National Route 17	167.0	79.1	○		80 km/h	Yuzawa	Niigata
TN	Ishiuchi Tunnel		↓	↑		Nerima-bound 1,590 m Nagaoka-bound 1,502 m	80 km/h	Minami- uonuma	Niigata
SA	Shiozawa- Ishiuchi SA		(173.5)	72.3		Nerima-bound only	80 km/h	Minami- uonuma	Niigata
16-1/ SA	Shiozawa- Ishiuchi IC/SA	Pref. Route 28 (Shiozawa Yamato Route)	175.5	70.6		SA: Nagaoka-bound only	80 km/h	Minami- uonuma	Niigata
BR	Nakanojima Bridge		↓	↑		Length: 460 m	80 km/h	Minami- uonuma	Niigata
17	Muikamachi IC	National Route 253	186.9	59.2	○		80 km/h	Minami- uonuma	Niigata
BR	Hakkai Bridge		↓	↑		Length: 610 m	80 km/h	Minami- uonuma	Niigata
17-1/ PA	Yamato PA/ SIC		198.3	47.8			80 km/h	Minami- uonuma	Niigata
18	Uonuma IC	National Route 291	204.4	41.7	○		80 km/h	Uonuma	Niigata
18-1/ PA	Horinouchi IC/PA	Pref. Route 84 (Horinouchi Inter Route)	212.1	34.0			80 km/h	Uonuma	Niigata
BR	Kawaguchi Bridge		↓	↑			80 km/h	Nagaoka	Niigata
19/SA	Echigo-Kawaguchi IC/SA	Pref. Route 83 (Kawaguchi Shiodono Route)	220.9	25.2	○		80 km/h	Nagaoka	Niigata
TN	Yamamotosan Tunnel		↓	↑		Nerima-bound 1,838 m Nagaoka-bound 1,804 m	80 km/h	Ojiya	Niigata
20	Ojiya IC	National Route 291	228.8	17.3	○		80 km/h	Ojiya	Niigata
20	Ojiya IC	National Route 291	228.8	17.3	○		100 km/h	Ojiya	Niigata
PA	Yamaya PA		230.9	15.2			100 km/h	Ojiya	Niigata
BS	Katakai BS		235.0	11.1	○		100 km/h	Ojiya	Niigata
BS	Koshiji BS		238.5	7.6	○		100 km/h	Nagaoka	Niigata
20-1	Nagaokaminami- Koshiji SIC	Pref. Route 23 (Kashiwazaki Takahama Horinouchi Route)	↓	↑			100 km/h	Nagaoka	Niigata
21	Nagaoka IC	National Route 8 Pref. Route 86 (Nagaoka Inter Route)	244.5	1.6	○		100 km/h	Nagaoka	Niigata
21	Nagaoka IC	National Route 8 Pref. Route 86 (Nagaoka Inter Route)	244.5	1.6	○		80 km/h	Nagaoka	Niigata
(37)	Nagaoka JCT	Hokuriku Expressway	246.1	0.0			80 km/h	Nagaoka	Niigata
Through to Hokuriku Expressway
