= Nishiōizumimachi =

Nishi-Ōizumimachi 西大泉町
- Exclave neighborhood
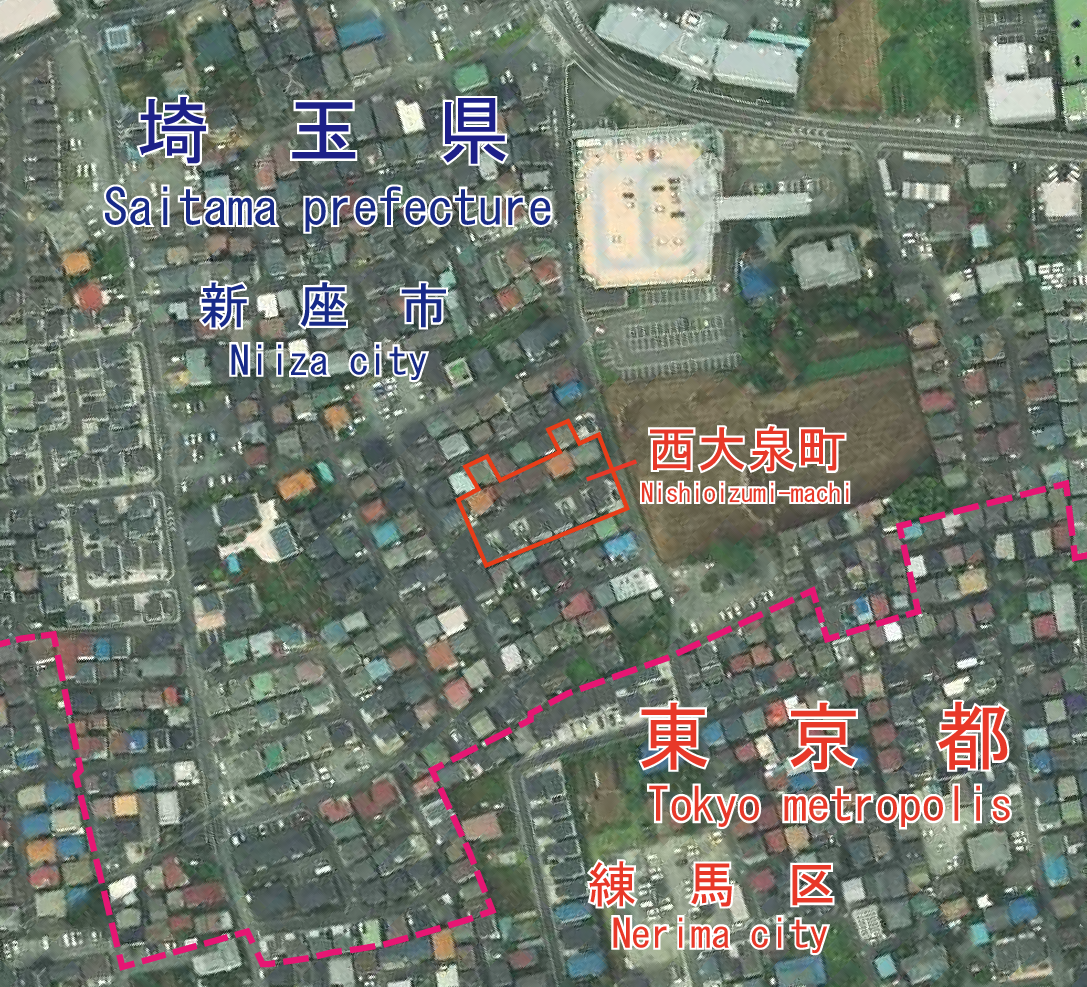

- Location within Special wards of Tokyo
- Coordinates: 35°45′48″N 139°34′01″E
- Country: Japan
- Metropolis: Tokyo
- Ward: Nerima

Population (April 1, 2023)
  - Total: 33

Nishi-Ōizumimachi (西大泉町) is a small exclave neighborhood of Nerima Ward, Tokyo, Japan, that is cut off from the ward, surrounded entirely by the neighborhood of Katayama 3-chōme in the city of Niiza, Saitama Prefecture, approximately 60 metres (200 ft) north of the border between Niiza and Tokyo's neighborhood of Nishi-Ōizumi 6-chōme in Nerima Ward. On April 1, 2023, there were fifteen households in this neighborhood, and its population was 33 (13 male and 20 female). The area contains one small street running through the center. The entire area bears the number 1179 and individual houses are numbered 21, 23 and 25.

== History ==
The exact date or reason for the exclave coming into existence is unknown, however it is theorised that it could be a remnant of a number of municipal mergers since the Meiji era. The exclave went unnoticed until a property developer wanted to turn the then farmland into housing discovered the anomaly in 1974. It is thought that the land may have been a field or falconry whenever the exclave was established.

== Government ==
Administratively, Nishi-Ōizumimachi is looked after by both Nerima Ward and the city of Niiza. Residents pay taxes to Nerima Ward, water and sewage is handled by the city of Niiza, whereas garbage disposal is handled by Nerima Ward. Students in the exclave must also attend elementary and junior high school in Nerima Ward. Residents have called Nishi-Ōizumimachi's governance inconvenient.

== Education ==
As of July 2022, the public schools designated for Nishi-Ōizumimachi residents are as follows:

- Elementary school: Nerima Ward Ōizumi-Nishi Elementary School.
- Junior High School: Nerima Ward Ōizumi-Nishi Junior High School.
