= Ōizumi Junction =

- Interactive map of Ōizumi Junction

Location
- Ōizumi-chō, Nerima, Tokyo
- Coordinates: 35.7589°N 139.599°E
- Roads at junction: Kan-etsu Expressway / Tokyo Gaikan Expressway

Construction

Ōizumi Junction (大泉ジャンクション, Ōizumi Jankushon) is a road interchange located in Nerima, Tokyo, Japan.

== Expressway ==
- East Nippon Expressway Company
  - Kan-etsu Expressway
  - Tokyo Gaikan Expressway

== Adjacent Interchanges ==
←	Service	→
East Expressway Company
Kan-Etsu Expressway
Nerima IC	-	Niiza TB
Gaikan Expressway
Ōizumi IC	-	Wakō IC
