= Japan National Route 298 =

Expressway in the Greater Tokyo area

National Route 298
- 国道298号
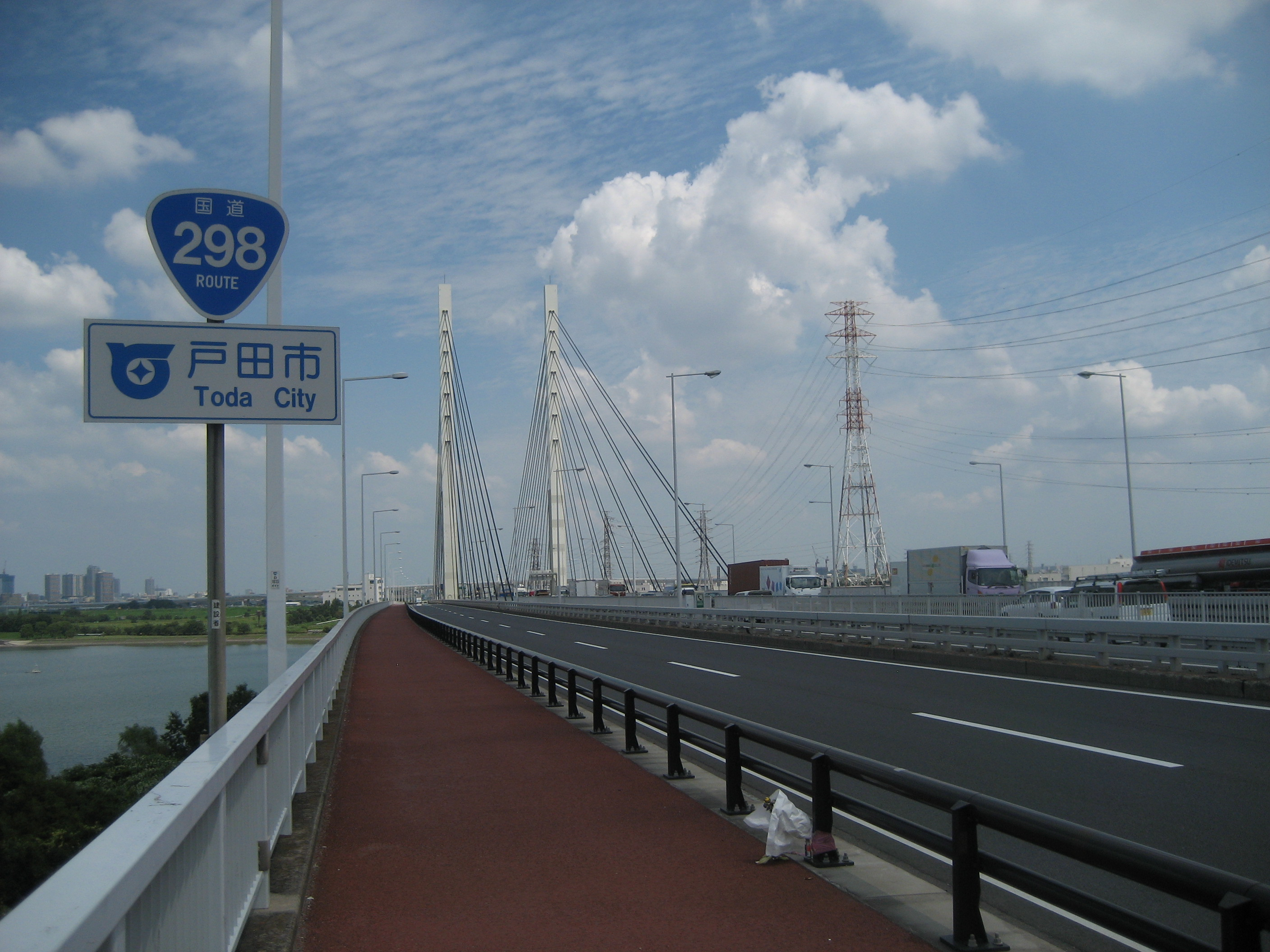
- Route 298 in Toda

Route information
- Length: 43.8 km (27.2 mi)
- Existed: 1970–present

Major junctions
- West end: National Route 254 in Wakō, Saitama
- East end: National Route 357 in Ichikawa, Chiba

Location
- Country: Japan

Highway system
- National highways of Japan; Expressways of Japan
← National Route 297	→ National Route 299

National Route 298 is a national highway of Japan connecting Wakō, Saitama and Ichikawa, Chiba in Japan, with a total length of 43.3 km (26.91 mi). Much of the route is concurrent with the Tokyo Gaikan Expressway, Tokyo's middle ring road.

== History ==
Route 298 was designated on 1 April 1970 from Toda to Ichikawa. On 1 April 1982 the road was extended to Wakō.
