= Tokyo Gaikan Expressway =

Semi-beltway in the Greater Tokyo area

Tokyo-Gaikan Expressway
- 東京外環自動車道

Route information
- Length: 33.7 km (20.9 mi)
- Existed: 1992–present

Major junctions
- From: Tōmei Junction in Setagaya, Tokyo; Tōmei Expressway (planned); Ōizumi Junction in Nerima, Tokyo (current)
- To: Kōya Junction in Ichikawa, Chiba; Higashi-Kantō Expressway; Shuto Expressway Bayshore Route

Location
- Country: Japan
- Major cities: Wakō, Toda, Saitama, Kawaguchi, Sōka, Yashio, Misato

Highway system
- National highways of Japan; Expressways of Japan

The Tokyo Gaikan Expressway (東京外環自動車道, Tōkyō Gaikan Jidōshadō) is a national expressway in Japan. It is owned and operated by East Nippon Expressway Company.

== Overview ==
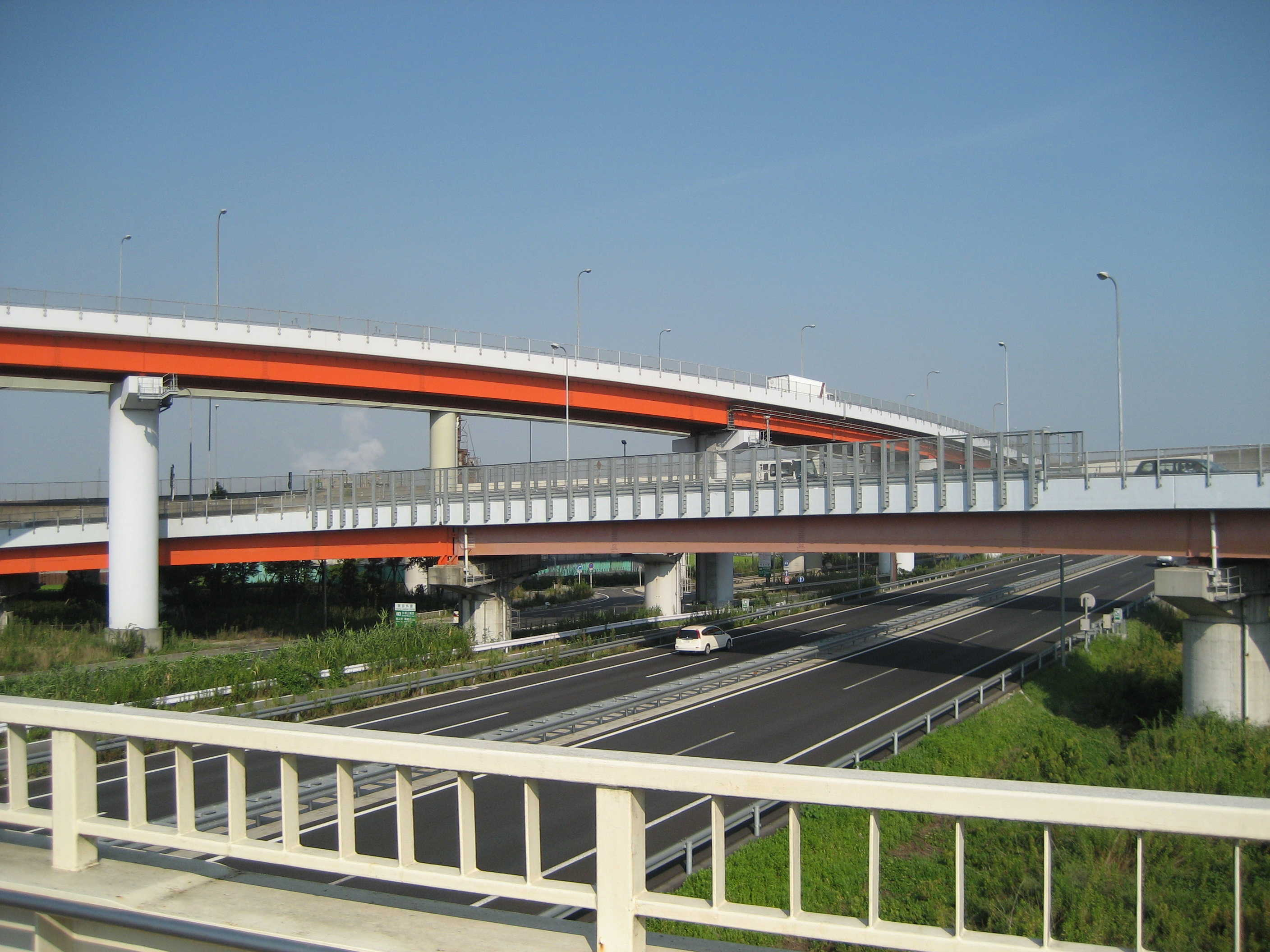
Tokyo Gaikan Expressway at Misato Junction where it crosses the Jōban Expressway.

The name Gaikan refers to the route's status as an outer ring road (beltway) for Tokyo. The expressway is also referred to simply as Gaikan for short. It is the third of four expressway ring routes in the greater Tokyo area, outside the Inner and Central Circular Routes, and inside the Ken-Ō Expressway.

A section of the expressway on the northern side of the Tokyo area was the first to open to traffic (Ōizumi Junction to Misato-minami Interchange). Most of this section is an elevated roadway built on the median of National Route 298 with curved windbreaks on both sides. Most of the roadway has two lanes in each direction (three lanes from Ōizumi Junction to Wakō-kita Interchange).

The eastern section from Misato to Ichikawa was opened to the public on 2 June 2018, three years after schedule. The western section from Izumi to the Chuo expressway is under construction, while the final section linking to the Tomei expressway is still at the planning stage. The western section will pass through the densely populated suburbs of western Tokyo; large parts of it will consist of tunnels constructed at least 40 m underground (deep underground).

The toll for a regular passenger car is currently 500 yen regardless of the distance travelled. Electronic Toll Collection (ETC) is accepted.

== List of interchanges and features ==
- PA - parking area, TB - toll gate

Prefecture	Location	km	mi	Exit	Name	Destinations	Notes
16.2 km section under construction, planned connection to Tōmei Expressway
Tokyo	Nerima	0.0	0.0	50	Ōizumi	Tokyo Metropolitan Route 24 (Nerima Tokorozawa Route); Kan-etsu Expressway north	Current western terminus
Saitama	Wakō	3.4	2.1	51	Wakō	Saitama Prefecture Route 88 (Wakō Inter Route)	
Saitama	Wakō	5.3	3.3	52	Wakō-kita	National Route 298	No through access between exit and PA
Saitama	Wakō	5.3	3.3	PA	Niikura		U-turns possible
Saitama	Wakō / Toda border			Sakitama Bridge			
Saitama	Toda	7.6	4.7	53	Toda-nishi	National Route 298	Misato-bound exit, Ōizumi-bound entrance only
Saitama	Toda	8.5	5.3	60	Bijogi	Ikebukuro Route; Ōmiya Route	Controlled by traffic lights
Saitama	Toda	9.9	6.2	61	Toda-higashi	National Route 298	Ōizumi-bound exit, Misato-bound entrance only
Saitama	Kawaguchi	12.3	7.6	62	Gaikan Urawa	National Route 298	Ōizumi-bound exit, Misato-bound entrance only
Saitama	Kawaguchi	14.0	8.7	63	Kawaguchi-nishi	National Route 298	Misato-bound exit, Ōizumi-bound entrance only
Saitama	Kawaguchi	16.8	10.4	64	Kawaguchi-Chūō	National Route 298	Ōizumi-bound exit, Misato-bound entrance only
Saitama	Kawaguchi	17.6	10.9	70	Kawaguchi	Tōhoku Expressway north Kawaguchi Route south	
Saitama	Kawaguchi	19.0	11.8	71	Kawaguchi-higashi	National Route 298	Ōizumi-bound exit, Misato-bound entrance only
Saitama	Sōka	22.4	13.9	72	Sōka	National Route 298; National Route 4	
Saitama	Yashio			73 / PA	Yashio	National Route 4	Planned
Saitama	Misato	28.4	17.6	74	Gaikan Misato-nishi	National Route 298	Misato-bound exit, Ōizumi-bound entrance only
Saitama	Misato	29.6	18.4	80	Misato	Jōban Expressway; Misato Route	
Saitama	Misato	31.0	19.3	81 / TB	Misato-Chūō	National Route 298	Ōizumi-bound exit, Kōya-bound entrance only
Saitama	Misato	33.7	20.9	82	Misato-minami	National Route 298	Kōya-bound exit, Ōizumi-bound entrance only
Chiba	Matsudo	39.1	24.3	83	Matsudo	National Route 298	Ōizumi-bound exit, Kōya-bound entrance only
Chiba	Ichikawa	40.1	24.9	84	Kita-Chiba	National Route 464 (Kita-Chiba Road)	Planned
Chiba	Ichikawa	41.3	25.7	85	Ichikawa-kita	National Route 298; Chiba Prefecture Route 264 (Takatsuka Shinden Ichikawa Route)	Kōya-bound exit, Ōizumi-bound entrance only
Chiba	Ichikawa	44.7	27.8	86	Ichikawa-Chūō	National Route 298	Ōizumi-bound exit, Kōya-bound entrance only
Chiba	Ichikawa	45.9	28.5	90	Keiyō	Keiyō Road	
Chiba	Ichikawa	47.6	29.6	91	Ichikawa-minami	National Route 298	Kōya-bound exit, Ōizumi-bound entrance only
Chiba	Ichikawa	49.2	30.6	100	Kōya	Higashi-Kantō Expressway; Bayshore Route	Eastern terminus
1.000 mi = 1.609 km; 1.000 km = 0.621 mi: Incomplete access; Unopened

== Gallery ==
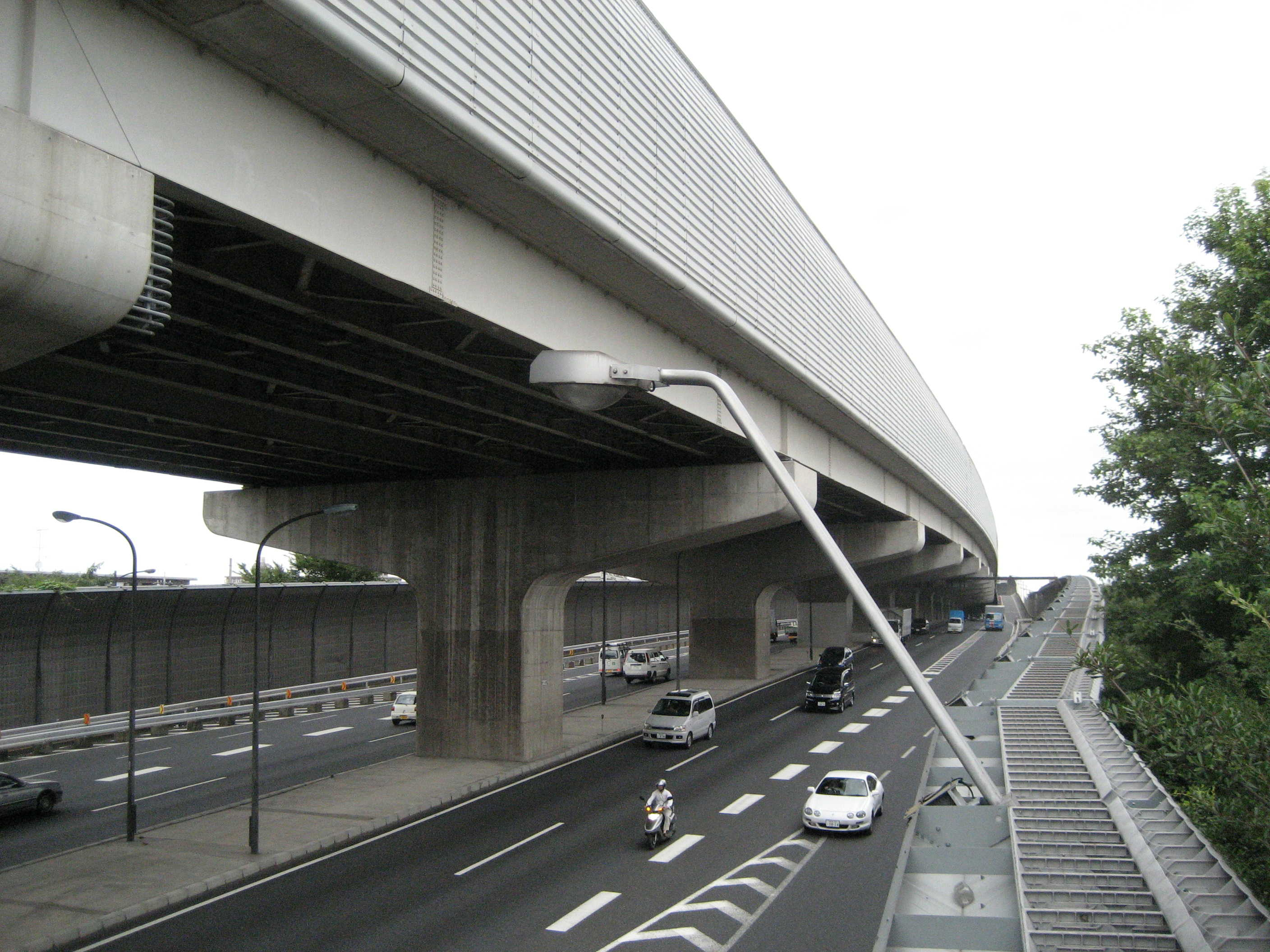
Gaikan above Route 298

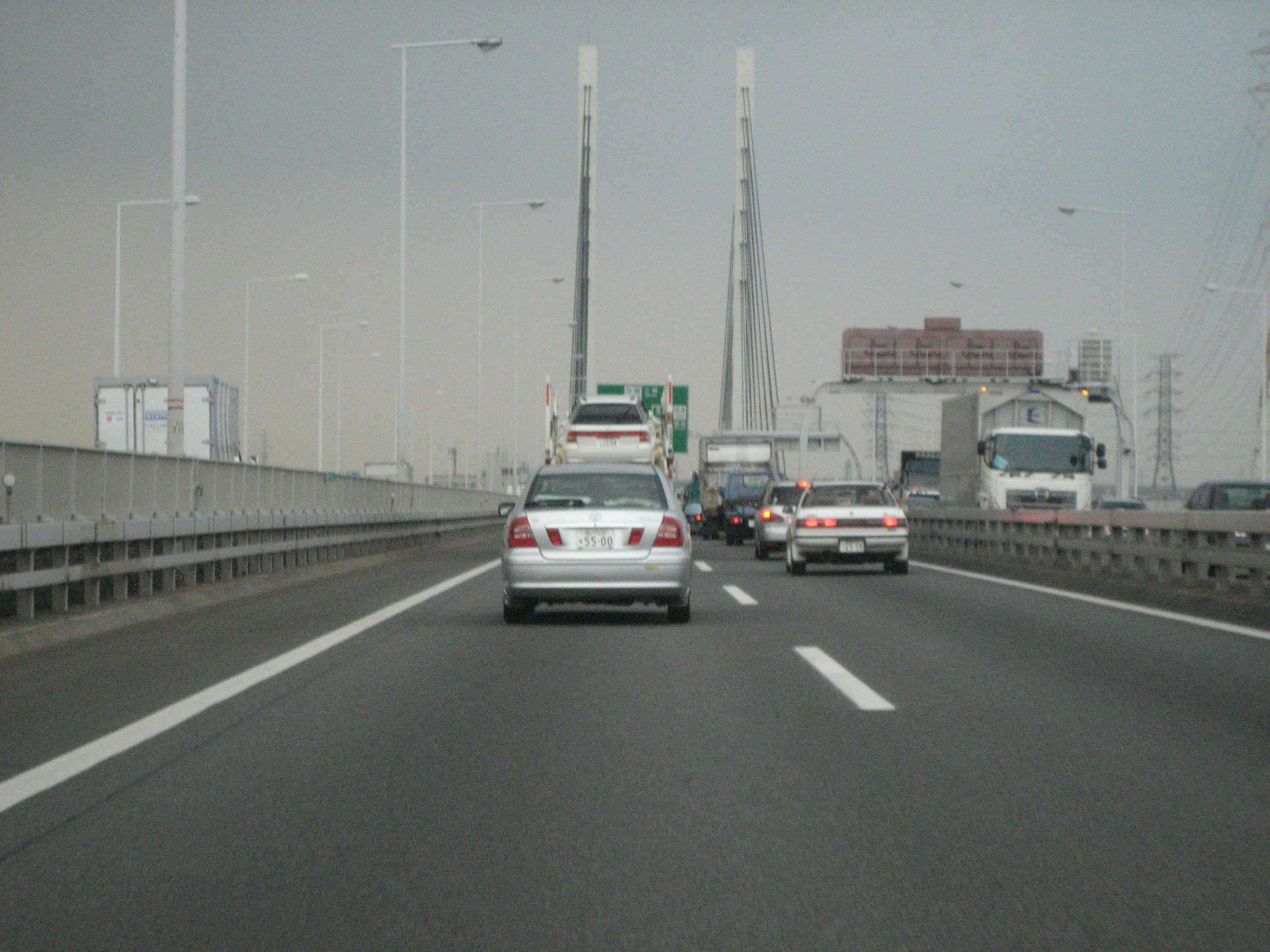
Sakitama Bridge

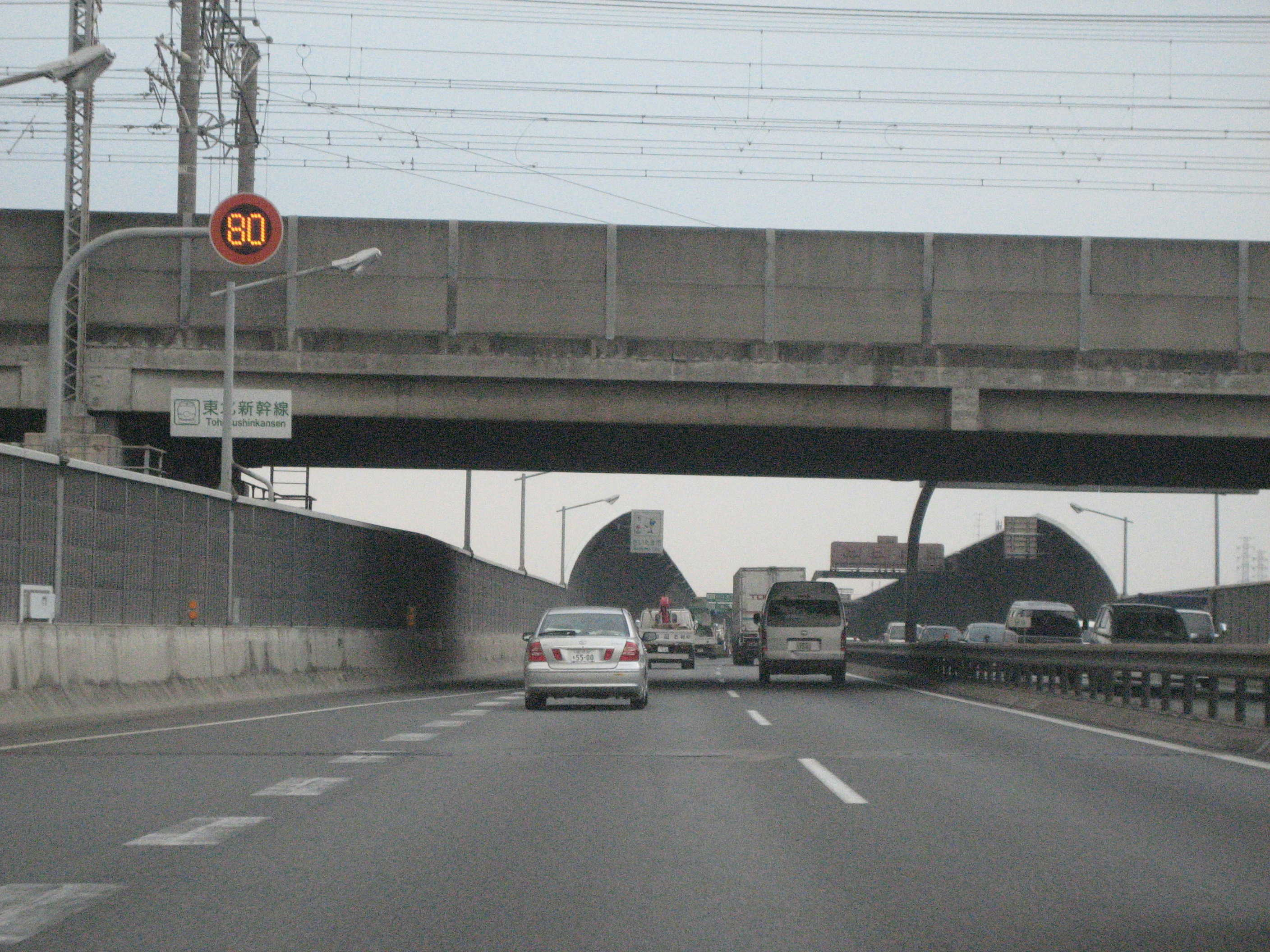
Gaikan passing under Tōhoku Shinkansen

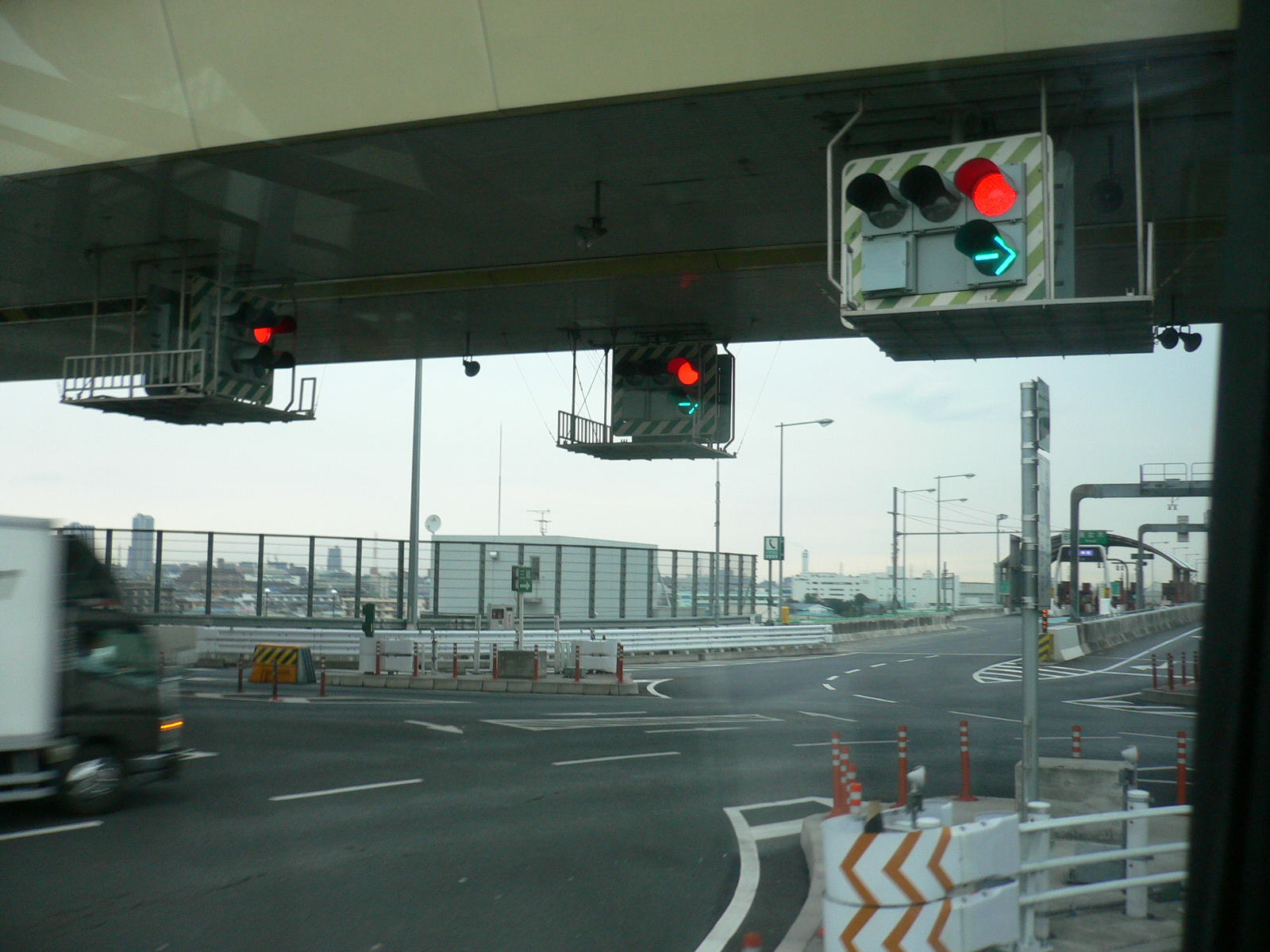
Traffic lights at Bijogi JCT
