= Shingashi River =

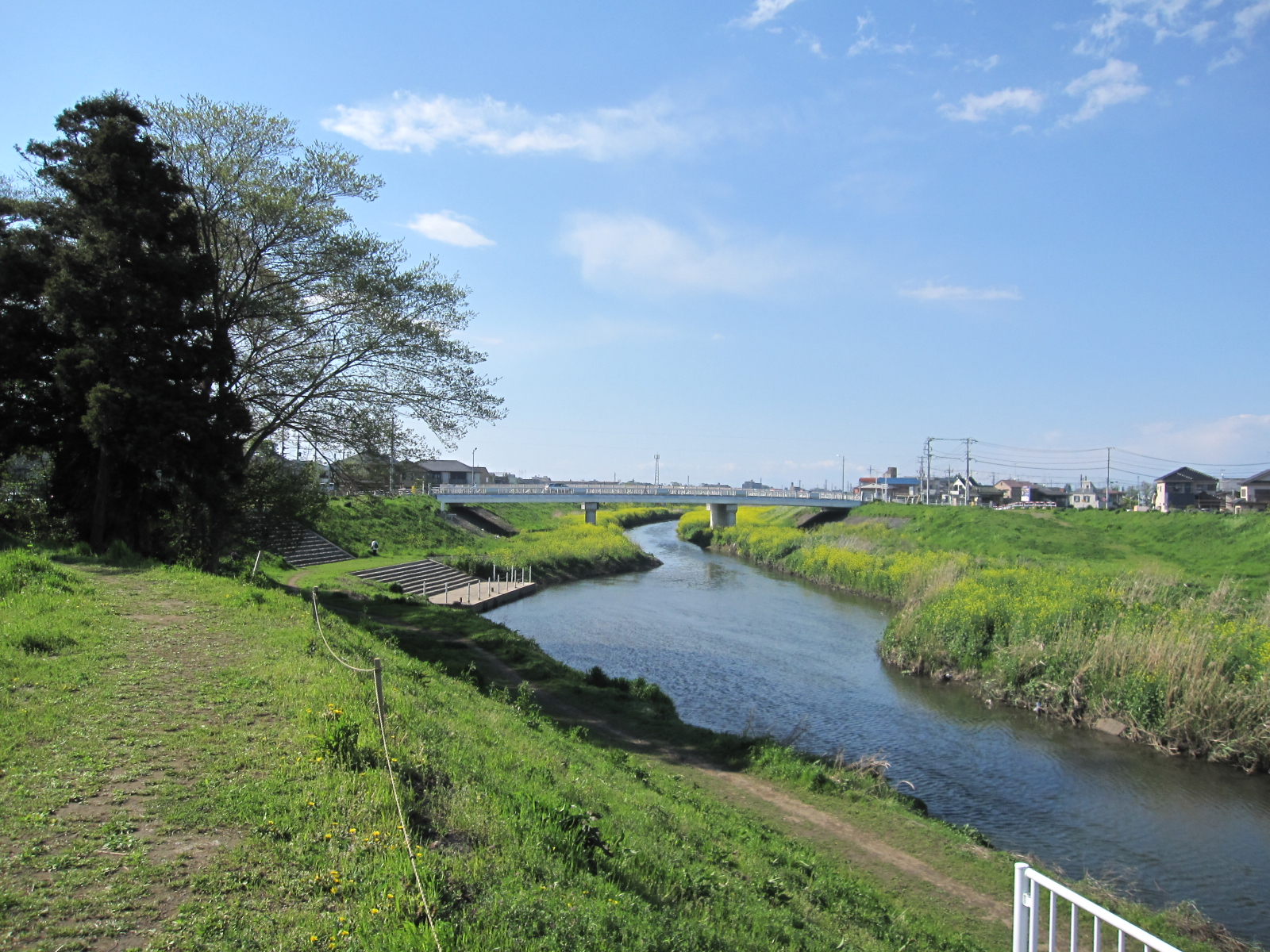
- Shingashi River at Kawagoe

- Native name: 新河岸川 (Japanese)

Location
- Country: Japan

Physical characteristics
- Source
  - location: Musashino Plateau, Saitama
- Mouth
  - location: Sumida River
  - coordinates: 35°47′02″N 139°44′03″E
- Length: 34.6 km (21.5 mi)

The Shingashi River (新河岸川, Shingashi-gawa) is a 34.6-kilometre (21.5 mi) long river that flows through Saitama and Tokyo, Japan. It flows from the Musashino Plateau into the Sumida River at Iwabuchi in Kita, Tokyo.
