= Wakō =

Wakō 和光市
- City
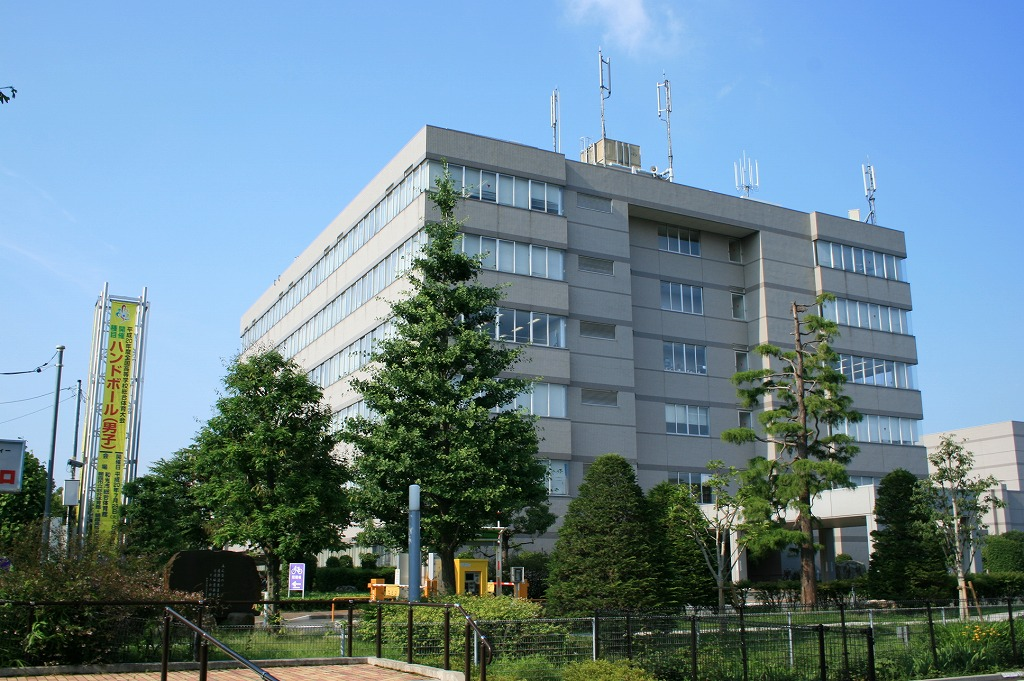
- Wakō City Hall

- Flag Seal

- Location of Wakō (dark pink) in Saitama Prefecture

- Location within Japan
- Coordinates: 35°46′52.4″N 139°36′20.5″E
- Country: Japan
- Region: Kantō
- Prefecture: Saitama

Area
  - Total: 11.04 km^{2} (4.26 sq mi)

Population (January 2021)
  - Total: 84,161
  - Density: 7,623/km^{2} (19,740/sq mi)
- Time zone: UTC+9 (Japan Standard Time)
- Tree: Ginkgo biloba
- Flower: Satsuki azalea
- Phone number: 048-464-1111
- Address: 1-5 Hirosawa, Wako-shi, Saitama-ken 351-0192
- Website: Official website

Wakō (和光市, Wakō-shi) is a city located in Saitama Prefecture, Japan. As of 1 January 2021, the city had an estimated population of 84,161 in 42,434 households and a population density of 7600 persons per km^{2}. The total area of the city is 11.04 square kilometres (4.26 sq mi).

== Geography ==
Wakō is located on the southern border of Saitama Prefecture, bordering Nerima Ward and Itabashi Ward in Tokyo. Topographically, it is located on the Musashino Terrace, with the Shirako River flowing along the border with Itabashi Ward, Tokyo on the east side of the city, and the Arakawa and Shingashi Rivers at the northern end of the city.

=== Surrounding municipalities ===
- Saitama Prefecture
  - Asaka
  - Toda
- Tokyo Metropolis
  - Itabashi
  - Nerima

=== Climate ===
Wakō has a humid subtropical climate (Köppen Cfa) characterized by warm summers and cool winters with light to no snowfall. The average annual temperature in Wakō is 14.4 °C. The average annual rainfall is 1647 mm with September as the wettest month. The temperatures are highest on average in August, at around 26.2 °C, and lowest in January, at around 2.7 °C.

== Demographics ==
Per Japanese census data, the population of Wakō has increased rapidly over the past 80 years.

Historical population
| Year | Pop. | ±% |
|---|---|---|
| 1920 | 4,409 | — |
| 1930 | 4,700 | +6.6% |
| 1940 | 5,572 | +18.6% |
| 1950 | 10,240 | +83.8% |
| 1960 | 17,242 | +68.4% |
| 1970 | 39,512 | +129.2% |
| 1980 | 49,713 | +25.8% |
| 1990 | 56,890 | +14.4% |
| 2000 | 70,170 | +23.3% |
| 2010 | 80,744 | +15.1% |
| 2020 | 83,989 | +4.0% |

== History ==
Archaeological examination of several sites around Wakō has revealed the remains of a number of villages in the area, including a large amount of Jōmon period pottery, stone tools and other remains. Signs of early rice cultivation coinciding with the Yayoi period as well as quantities of Yayoi period pottery and implements have also been found. The area of modern Wakō developed from the Muromachi period as Shirako-juku, a post station on the Kawagoe-kaidō highway.

The villages of Shirako and Niikura were created within Niikura District, Saitama with the establishment of the modern municipalities system on April 1, 1889. Niikura District was abolished in 1894, becoming part of Kitaadachi District. The two villages were merged on April 1, 1943, becoming the town of Yamato. Yamato was elevated to city status on October 31, 1970 and was renamed Wakō.

== Government ==
Wakō has a mayor-council form of government with a directly elected mayor and a unicameral city council of 18 members. Wakō contributes one member to the Saitama Prefectural Assembly. In terms of national politics, the city is part of Saitama 4th district of the lower house of the Diet of Japan.

== Economy ==
Since it is adjacent to Tokyo metropolis, the population of Wakō rapidly increased as a commuter town after World War II. It developed as an industrial city due to the construction of a factory of Honda Motor Company, (since closed, but Honda's R&D Center remains in Wakō). The head offices of RIKEN, a large natural sciences research institute in Japan, are also located in the city.

== Education ==
Wakō has eight public elementary schools and three public middle schools operated by the city government, and two public high schools operated by the Saitama Prefectural Board of Education. In addition, the prefecture also operates two special education schools for the handicapped.

== Transportation ==
=== Railway ===
Tōbu Railway - Tōbu Tōjō Line

- Wakōshi

Tokyo Metro - Yūrakuchō Line/Fukutoshin Line

- Wakōshi

=== Highway ===
- Tokyo Gaikan Expressway
- National Route 254
- National Route 298

== Sister cities ==
- Longview, Washington, United States, since October 1, 1999

== Local attractions ==
=== Myoten-ji ===
This temple was consecrated by Sudagoro Tokimitsu, the local administrator of Shimoniikura (1278–1287). A statue of Nichiren and a wooden plaque with the inscription: "Namu myoho rengekyo" reside in the temple. They are important treasures of Wakō city.

=== Koyasu no Shimizu (Temple for safe childbirth) ===
Per local legend, Nichiren called at the house of his old friend, Tokimitsu while on his way to exile in Sado. Tokimitsu's wife was going through a difficult childbirth. When Nichiren prayed for a safe delivery and made a blessing with a willow twig a spring of pure water sprang up on the spot. Nichiren then had Tokimitu's wife hold the willow twig while water from the spring was poured into her mouth whereupon she soon gave birth to a healthy baby boy. There used to be a large willow tree beside the pond at the temple, and it is said that this tree grew from the twig that Nichiren used to bless the birth. The tree is no longer there today.

=== Kawagoe Kaidō ===
The Kawagoe Kaidō was a highway completed in 1633 when the third shōgun Tokugawa Iemitsu visited Kawagoe Senpa Tōshōgū (Shinto shrine). At that time, Kawagoe Castle played an important role in governing the northern part of Musashi Province. Kawagoe was 10 Ri (about 40 kilometres (25 mi)) from Nihonbashi in the old part of Edo and there were six shukuba along the way, namely: Kamiitabashi, Shimonerima, Shirako, Hizaori, Ōwada, and Ōi. These post stations were officially regulated settlements catering to travelers. Shirako-juku was 20 kilometres (12 mi) from Edo and travelers often stopped there for lunch. After a steep winding hill and with ample spring water, Shirako-juku was a good rest stop. Travelers came from the direction of Nittazaka then went up O-saka and down Kurayami-zaka, which was dark even in the daytime.

=== Choshōji (Temple of the Shingon Sect) ===
The origin of this Shingon sect temple pre-dates the Edo period. The temple was dedicated to the Juichimen Kannon (Kannon with eleven faces). The wooden statue may have been made at the beginning of the Edo period. There is a huge Ginkgo tree in the temple grounds. The tree is estimated to be over 700 years old, has a diameter of more than 7.5 meters and stands nearly 30 meters tall. It is designated as a natural monument of the Wako City.

=== Ikkan-ji, Gorintō Pagoda ===
Ikkan-ji is a Sōtō sect temple built during the Kan'ei era (1624–43) and was consecrated by Sakai Tadashige, a local administrator of Shimoniikura in the Edo period. It served as the family temple of the Sakai clan. Gorintō, or stone five level pagodas were placed at graves as a memorial and to console the spirits of the departed. Three gorinto can be found at Ikkan-ji at the graves of Tadashige Sakai, his wife, and a former administrator's wife.

== Notable people ==
- Yumi Kajihara, cyclist
- Keisuke Kato, actor
- Toshio Kayama, politician
- Kaori Matsumura, tarento, former idol
