= Ōizumi-Gakuenchō =

Coordinates: 35°45′59″N 139°35′15″E

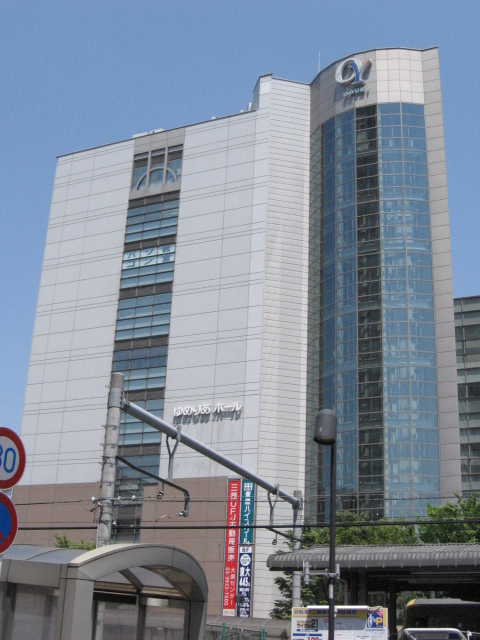
Yumeria Hall

Ōizumi-Gakuenchō (大泉学園町, Ōizumi-gakuen-chō) is a neighborhood of Nerima Ward, Tokyo, Japan. It is located around 1.5 kilometers north of Ōizumi-gakuen Station of Seibu Railway Seibu Ikebukuro Line and consists of nine chōme or Streets. Its total area is 3.211 km^{2}.

The neighborhood is colloquially simply called Ōizumi-gakuen. However, the simplified term is often used to refer to the area around Ōizumi-gakuen Station, which is located in the Higashi-Ōizumi neighborhood.

== History ==
Historically, the main industry of the Ōizumi-Gakuenchō area was agriculture, but after the establishment of Higashi-Ōizumi Station (now Ōizumi-gakuen Station) in 1924, its surrounding area saw a great development as a commercial neighborhood and, consequently, Ōizumi-Gakuenchō grew to be a quiet residential neighborhood for a number of upper-income earners.

== Notable people ==
- Natsuki Ozawa, Japanese singer, actress and AV actress
