= Japan National Route 17 =

Road in Japan

National Route 17
- 国道17号
- Japan National Route 17 highlighted in red

Route information
- Length: 350.3 km (217.7 mi)
- Existed: 4 December 1952–present

Major junctions
- National Route 7 / National Route 8 / National Route 49 / National Route 113 / National Route 116 in Chūō-ku, Niigata
- South end: National Route 1 / National Route 4 / National Route 6 / National Route 14 / National Route 15 / National Route 20 in Nihonbashi, Chūō, Tokyo

Location
- Country: Japan

Highway system
- National highways of Japan; Expressways of Japan
← National Route 16	→ National Route 18

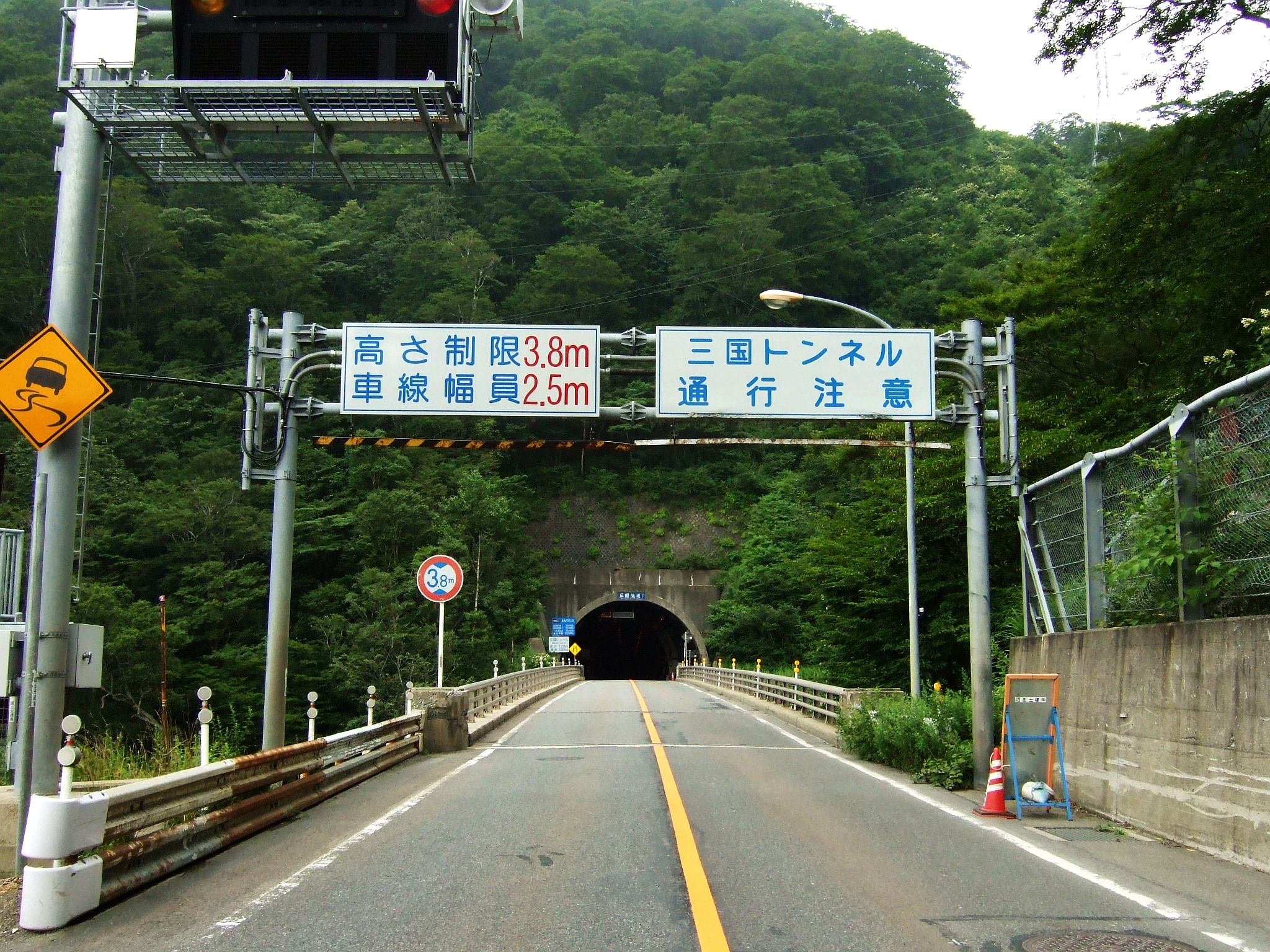
Mikuni Tunnel

National Route 17 (国道17号, Kokudō Jū-nana-gō) is a highway on the island of Honshu in Japan. It originates at Nihonbashi in Chūō, Tokyo, and terminates in the city of Niigata (the capital of Niigata Prefecture), where it meets National Routes 7, 8, 49, 113 and 116).

National Route 17 measures 350.3 km in length. It incorporates parts of two ancient highways, the Nakasendō and Mikuni Kaidō. The newer Kan-Etsu Expressway parallels National Route 17.

In addition to Chūō, National Route 17 passes through Itabashi. It links the prefectural capitals of Saitama (Saitama Prefecture) and Maebashi (Gunma Prefecture).

== Route data ==
- Length: 351.1 km (217.7 mi)
- Origin: Nihonbashi, Chūō, Tokyo (originates at junction with Routes 1, 4, 6, 14, 15 and 20)
- Terminus: Chuo-ku, Niigata (ends at Junction with Routes 7, 8, 49, 113 and 116)
- Major cities: Saitama, Kumagaya, Takasaki, Maebashi, Shibukawa, Numata, Minami-Uonuma, Nagaoka, Sanjo

== Other names ==
- 4 December 1952: First Class National Highway 17 (Tokyo to Niigata)
- 1 April 1965: General National Highway 17 (Tokyo to Niigata)

== Gallery ==
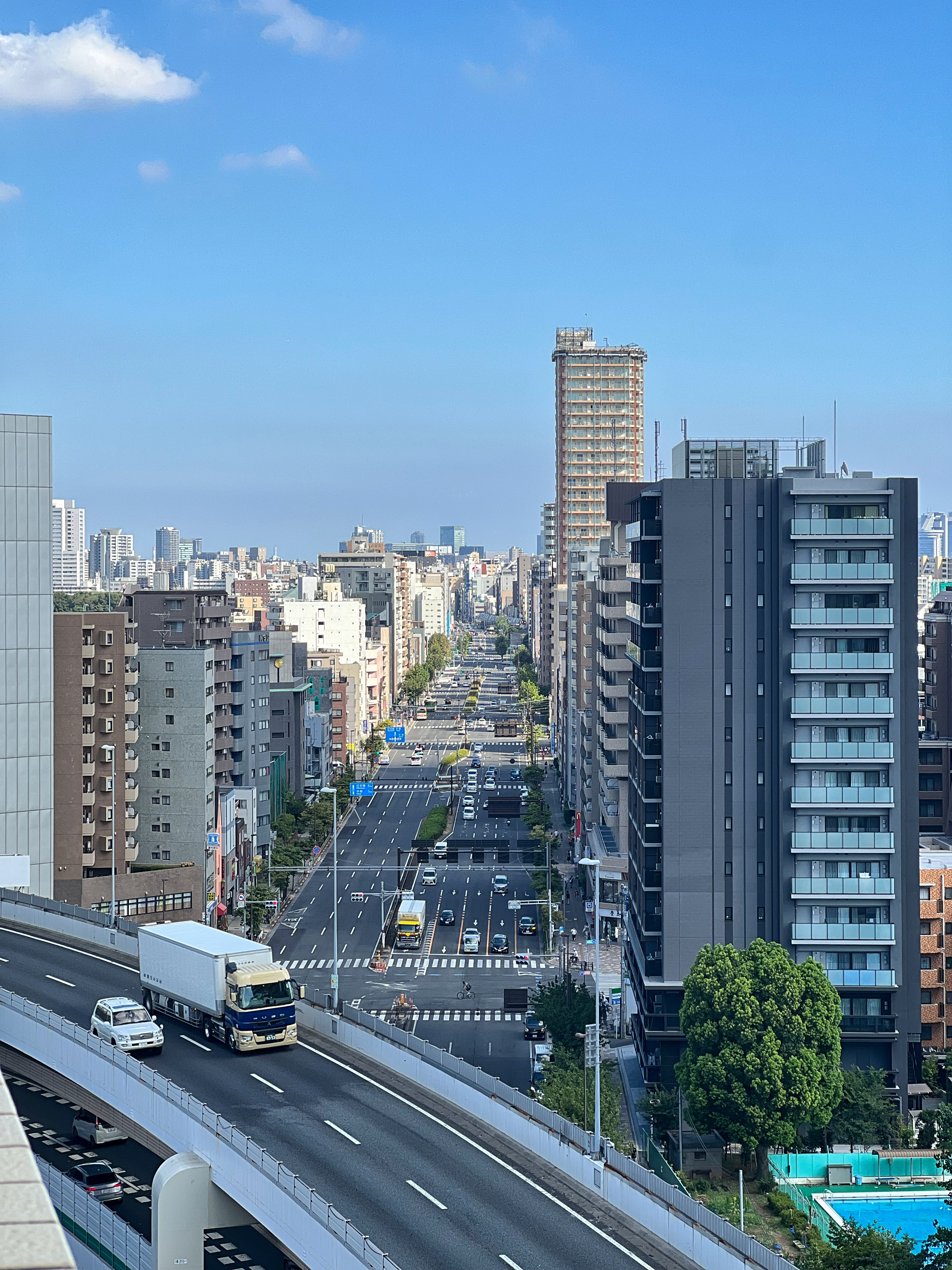
Route 17 intersects with the C2 Central Circular Route of the Shuto Expressway near Nishi-Sugamo Station

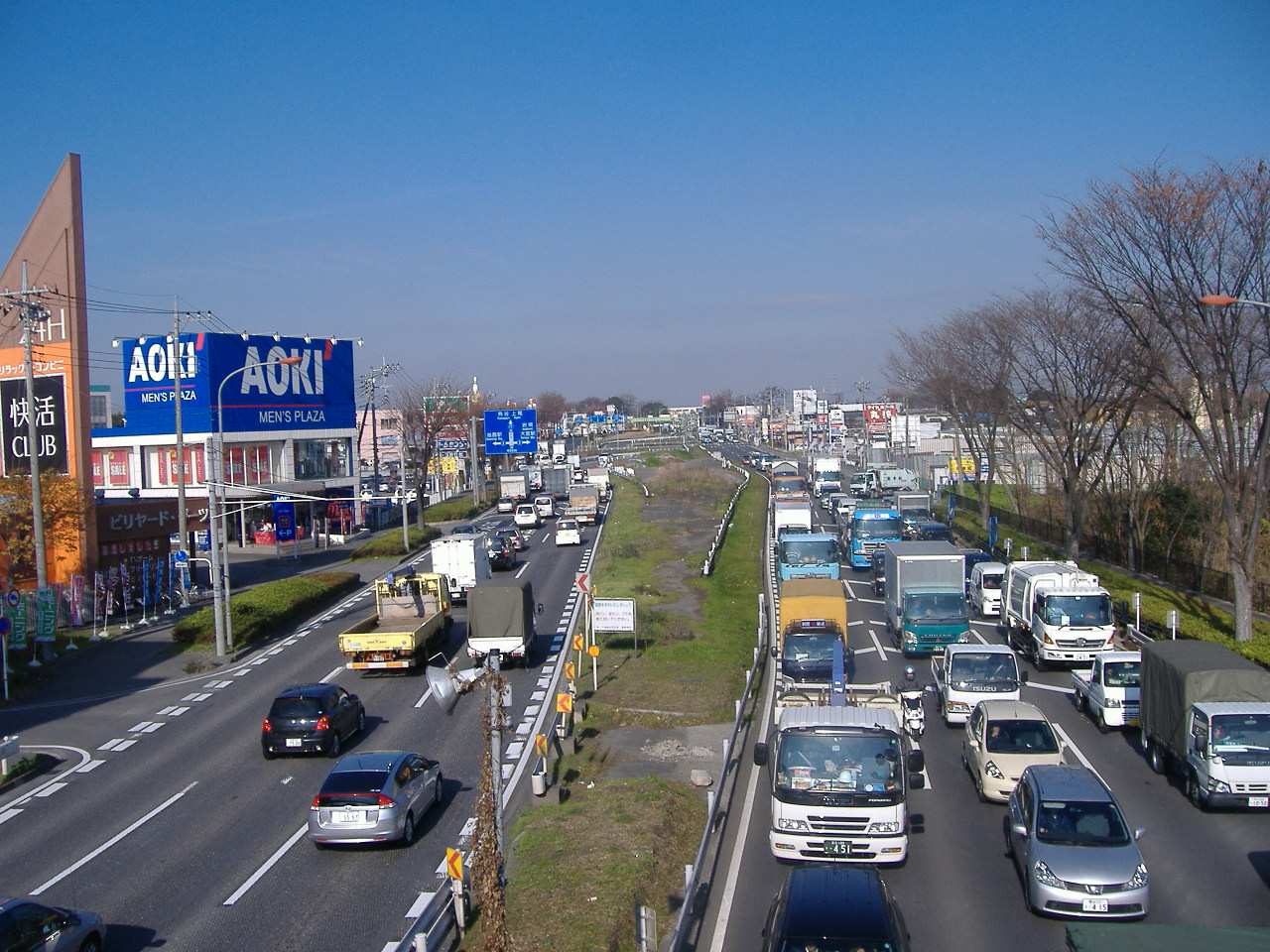
Shin-Omiya bypass in Saitama City

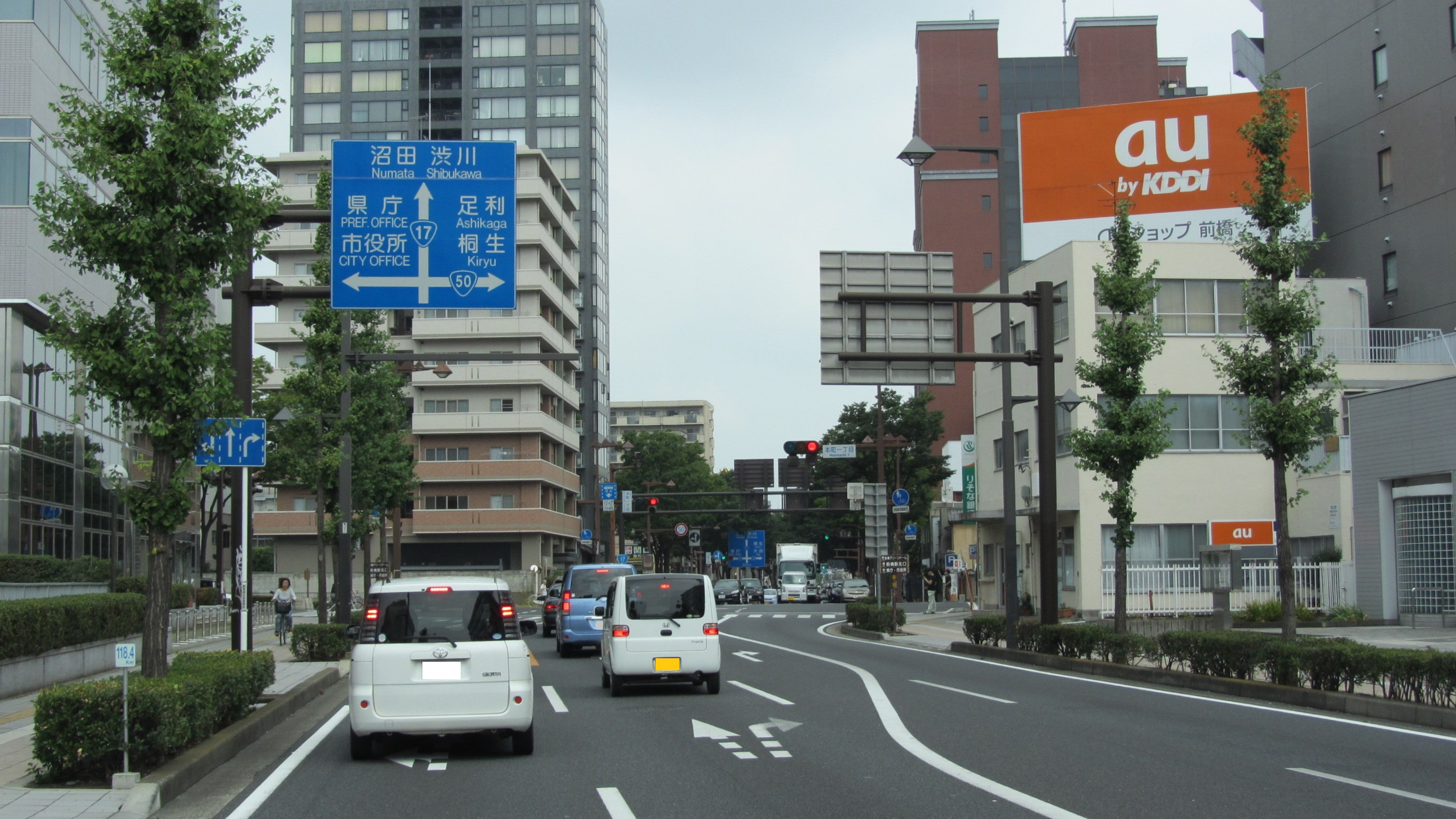
Route 17 in Maebashi, Gunma Prefecture

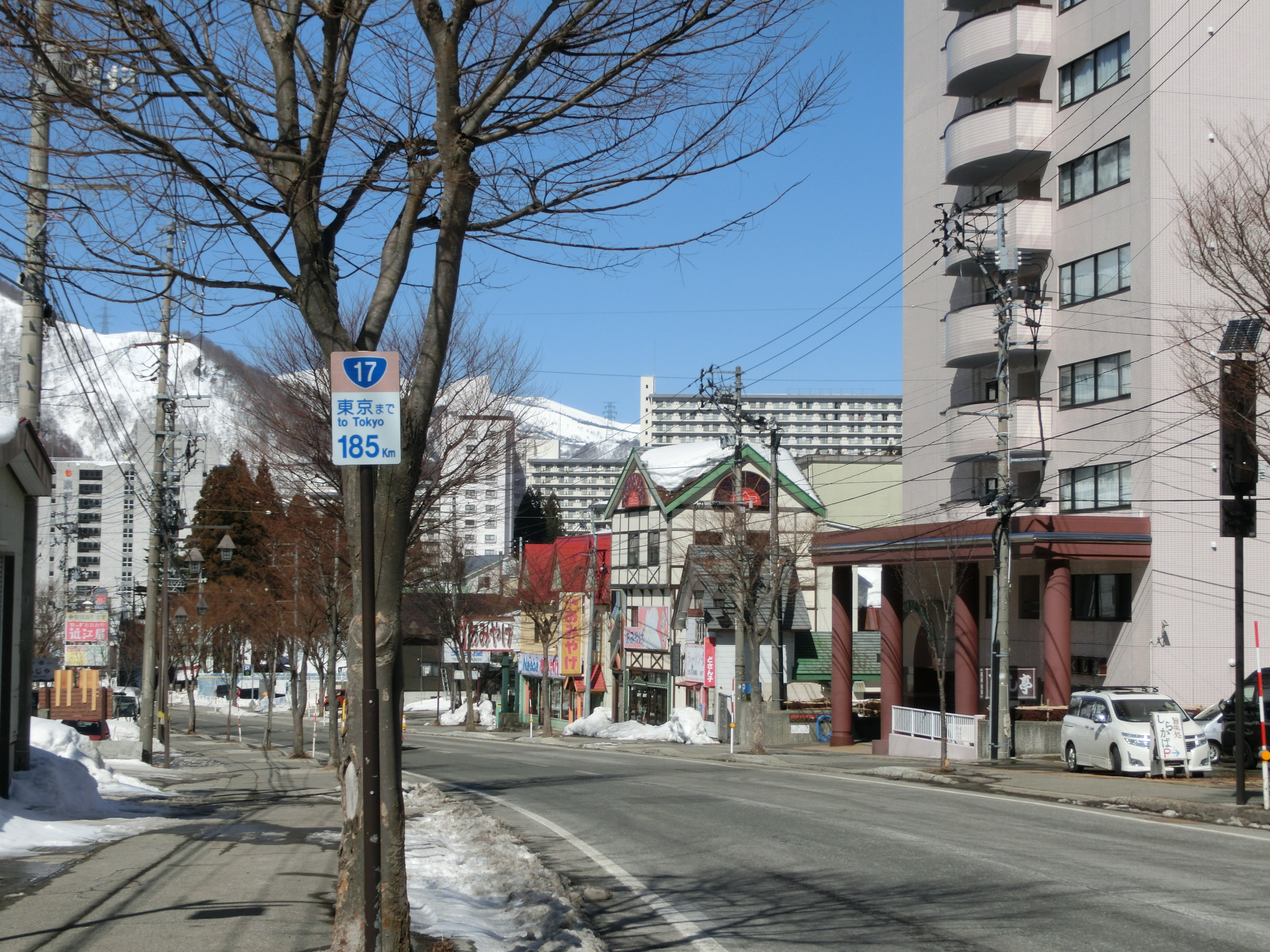
Route 17 in Yuzawa, Niigata Prefecture
