= Nishi-Kyūshū Expressway =

Expressway in Japan

Nishi-Kyūshū Expressway
- 西九州自動車道

Route information
- Length: 150 km (93 mi)
- Existed: 1988–present
- Component highways: National Route 497

Major junctions
- From: Fukushige Junction in Nishi-ku, Fukuoka; Fukuoka Expressway Circular Route
- To: Takeo Junction in Takeo; Nagasaki Expressway

Location
- Country: Japan
- Major cities: Karatsu, Imari, Matsuura; Sasebo

Highway system
- National highways of Japan; Expressways of Japan

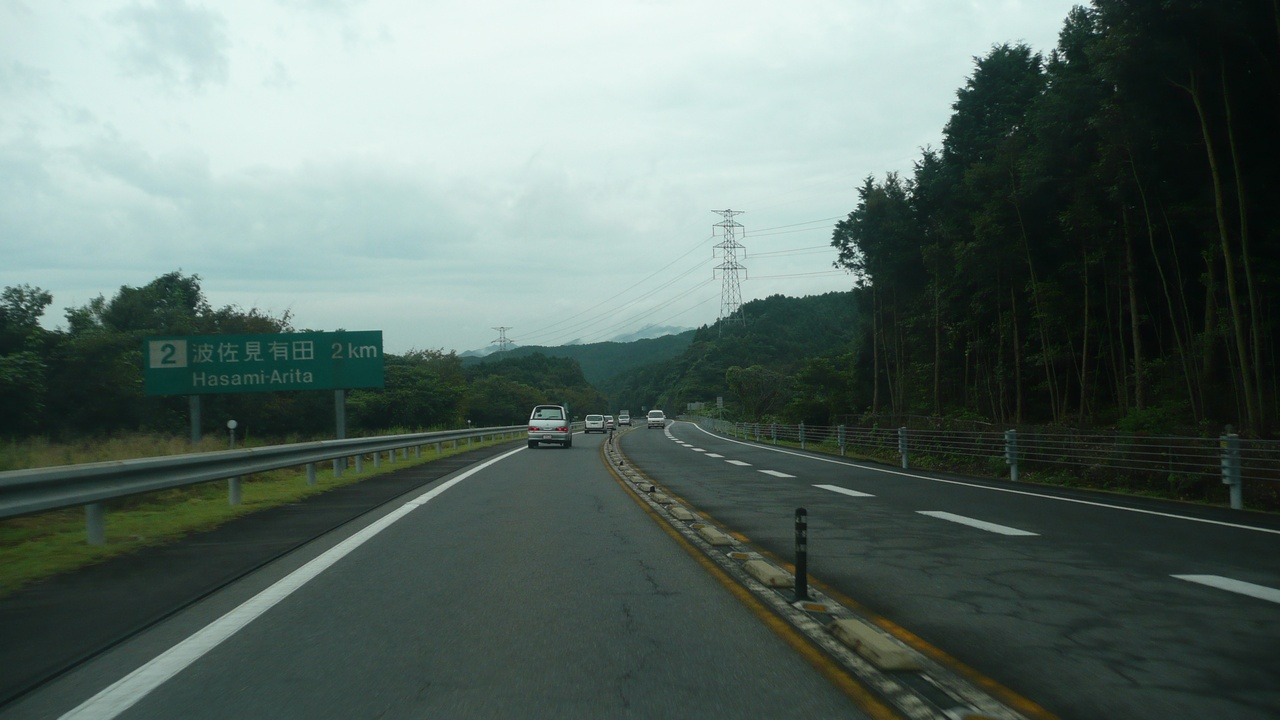
Hasami, Nagasaki, Japan

The Nishikyushu Expressway (西九州自動車道, Nishi-Kyūshū jidōshadō) is one of the expressways of Japan which goes from Fukuoka to Takeo, running through the prefecture of Saga and the northern half of the Nagasaki Prefecture. The total length is 150 km.

Part of the road is specified as Route 497. This road has two toll zones. The Fukuoka and Maebaru toll zone is managed by Fukuoka Prefectural Road Public Corporation. The Takeo and Sasebo toll zone is managed by West Nippon Expressway Company. The other roadway is managed by MLIT. This road is connected to Fukuoka Expressway Circular Route in Nishi-ku, Fukuoka, and to Nagasaki Expressway in Takeo. From Nijō to Nijō Shika Interchange this expressway overlaps a section of Nijō Hamatama road.

== Overview ==
The first section of the expressway was opened to traffic in 1988. As of April 2016 the expressway was incomplete in many areas. The next sections were scheduled to open in 2017 (Minamihata Taniguchi Interchange to Imari Higashi Interchange) and (Imabuku Interchange to Tsukinokawa Interchange). After this, most of the incomplete areas were to be built according to the New Direct Control System, whereby the burden for construction costs will be shared by the national and local governments and no tolls were to be collected. Currently the section between Nijō Shikaka Interchange and Minamihata Taniguchi Interchange, Yamashiro Kubara Interchange and Imabuku Interchange, and Saza Interchange and Sasebo Daitō Interchange operates according to this principle.

The expressway is four lanes wide from Fukushige Junction to Higashi Intersection (temporary interchange) and Saza Interchange to Sasebo Chūō Interchange, and two lanes for all remaining sections.

== History ==
- March 24, 1988, a section from Sasebo Daitō to Hasami Arita Interchanges was opened to traffic.
- November 30, 1989, a section from Hasami Arita to Takeo Minami Interchange was opened to traffic.
- January 26, 1990, a section from Takeo Minami Interchange to Takeo Junction was opened to traffic with another freeway.
- March 26, 1993, a section from Susenji Interchange to Higashi Intersection (temporary interchange) was opened to traffic.
- April 17, 1998, a section from Sasebo Minato to Sasebo Daitō Interchange was opened to traffic.
- September 26, 1998, a section from Jyūrokuchō to Susenji Interchanges was opened to traffic.
- October 13, 2001, a section from Fukushige Junction to Jyūrokuchō Interchange was opened to traffic with another freeway.
- November 2003, a section from Fukushige Junction to Maebaru Interchange which made with four lanes.
- December 18, 2005, a section from Hamatama to Karatsu Interchange was opened to traffic.
- December 12, 2009, a section from Nijō Shikaka to Hamatama Interchange was opened to traffic with another freeway.
- March 20, 2010, a section from Ainoura Nakazato to Sasebo Minato Interchanges was opened to traffic.
- February 26, 2011, a section from Fukushige Junction to the east was opened with other freeway.
- September 13, 2011, a section from Saza to Ainoura Nakazato Interchange was opened to traffic.
- March 24, 2012, a section from Karatsu to Karatsu Chichika Yamada Interchange was opened to traffic.
- March 23, 2013, a section from Karatsu Chichika Yamada to Kitahata Interchange was opened to traffic.
- February 1, 2015, a section from Kitahata to Minamihata Taniguchi Interchange was opened to traffic.
- March 14, 2015, a section from Yamashiro Kubara to Imabuku Interchange was opened to traffic.
- November 5, 2017, a section from Imabuku to Tsukinokawa Interchange was opened to traffic.
- March 31, 2018, a section from Minamihata Taniguchi to Imari Higashi Interchange was opened to traffic.
- December 15, 2018, a section from Tsukinokawa to Matsuura Interchange was opened to traffic.

== Interchanges ==
- IC - interchange, SIC - smart interchange, JCT - junction, SA - service area, PA - parking area, BS - bus stop, TN - tunnel, BR - bridge, TB - toll gate
- Bus stops labeled "○" are currently in use; those marked "◆" are closed.

No.	Name	Connections	Dist. from Origin	Bus stop	Notes	Location	
JCT	Fukushige JCT	Fukuoka Expressway Circular Route	0.0			Fukuoka	Nishi-ku, Fukuoka
	Jyūrokuchō IC	National Route 202 (Imajuku Road)	0.8		Sasebo-bound entrance	Fukuoka	Nishi-ku, Fukuoka
	Jyūrokuchō IC	National Route 202 (Imajuku Road)	2.0		Sasebo-bound exit	Fukuoka	Nishi-ku, Fukuoka
TB/PA	Fukuoka Nishi TB/PA		2.1			Fukuoka	Nishi-ku, Fukuoka
	Imajuku IC	National Route 202 (Imajuku Road)	3.5		For Fukuoka only	Fukuoka	Nishi-ku, Fukuoka
	Susenji IC	National Route 202 (Imajuku Road)	6.6		For Sasebo only	Fukuoka	Nishi-ku, Fukuoka
TB	Maebaru TB		12.1			Fukuoka	Itoshima
	Maebaru IC		12.6		For Fukuoka only	Fukuoka	Itoshima
	Higashi Intersection (temporary interchange)	National Route 202 (Imajuku Road); Pref. Route 573 (Hon Kafuri Teishajō Route)	14.2			Fukuoka	Itoshima
	Nijō IC	Pref. Route 49 (Onojō Nijō Route)			Planned	Fukuoka	Itoshima
Planned route Through to National Route 202 Nijō Hamatama Road						Fukuoka	Itoshima
	Nijō Shikaka IC		0.0			Fukuoka	Itoshima
	Hamatama IC	National Route 323	3.8			Saga	Karatsu
	Karatsu IC	Pref. Route 40 (Hamatama Ōchi Route); Pref. Route 258 (Handa Onizuka Route); Saga Karatsu Road (planned)	10.4			Saga	Karatsu
	Karatsu Chichika Yamada IC	Pref. Route 320 (Chichika Kōda Route)	14.9			Saga	Karatsu
	Kitahata IC	Pref. Route 50 (Karatsu Kitahata Route)	18.4			Saga	Karatsu
	Minamihata Taniguchi IC	Pref. Route 297 (Shioya Omagari Route)	23.2			Saga	Imari
	Imari Hagashi IC	National Route 202	28.5			Saga	Imari
Planned route						Saga	Imari
	Imari Naka IC				Planned	Saga	Imari
	Imari Nishi IC	National Route 204			Planned	Saga	Imari
	Kusuku IC	Pref. Route 5 (Imari Matsuura Route)			Planned	Saga	Imari
	Yamashiro Kubara IC	National Route 204	0.0			Saga	Imari
	Imabuku IC	National Route 204	5.5			Nagasaki	Matsuura
	Tsukinokawa IC		8.1		For Fukuoka only	Nagasaki	Matsuura
	Matsuura IC	National Route 204 (Matsuura Bypass)	10.3			Nagasaki	Matsuura
Planned route
	Hirado Mikuriya Emukae IC				Planned	Nagasaki	Sasebo
	Emukae Shikamachi IC				Planned	Nagasaki	Sasebo
8	Saza IC		38.9			Nagasaki	Saza
7	Ainoura Nakazato IC	Pref. Route 11 (Sasebo Hino Matsuura Route)	34.9			Nagasaki	Sasebo
6	Sasebo Chūō IC	Pref. Route 11 (Sasebo Hino Matsuura Route)	29.9			Nagasaki	Sasebo
5	Sasebo Minato IC	Pref. Route 11 (Sasebo Hino Matsuura Route); Pref. Route 26 (Sasebo Port Route)	27.0		For Takeo only	Nagasaki	Sasebo
4	Sasebo Daitō IC/TB	National Route 205 (Hario Bypass)	22.1			Nagasaki	Sasebo
3	Sasebo Mikawachi IC/TB	National Route 35	14.8			Nagasaki	Sasebo
2	Hasami Arita IC	Pref. Route 4 (Kawatana Arita Route)	10.1	○		Nagasaki	Hasami
1	Takeo Minami IC/TB	National Route 34	0.0		For Fukuoka only	Saga	Takeo
6	Takeo JCT	Nagasaki Expressway	0.7			Saga	Takeo
