= E50 =

E50 or E-50 may refer to:

- Nimzo-Indian Defence, Encyclopaedia of Chess Openings code
- E-50 Standardpanzer, a German World War II tank model in the Entwicklung series
- European route E50, a road connecting Brest in France with Makhachkala in the Russian Republic of Dagestan
- M113 E50, a version of the Mercedes-Benz M113 engine
- M2 E-50, a version of the M2 Browning machine gun
- Nokia E50, a smartphone
- HMS E50, a British E class submarine of the First World War
- E50, a road route in Japan:
  - Kita-Kantō Expressway
  - Higashi-Mito Road
  - Hitachinaka Road
