= Japan National Route 497 =

Road in Japan

National Route 497
- 国道497号

Route information
- Length: 63.5 km (39.5 mi)

Location
- Country: Japan

Highway system
- National highways of Japan; Expressways of Japan
← National Route 496	→ National Route 498

National Route 497 is a national highway of Japan connecting between Hakata-ku, Fukuoka and Takeo, Saga in Japan, with total length has 63.5 km (39.5 mi).

A major part of the road is known as the Nishikyūshū Expressway (西九州自動車道, Nishi Kyūshū Jidōshadō), a toll road connecting Fukuoka and Takeo, Saga managed by West Nippon Expressway Company.
