= Meishin Expressway =

National expressway on the island of Honshū in Japan

Meishin Expressway
- 名神高速道路

Route information
- Part of AH1
- Maintained by the Central Nippon Expressway Company and the West Nippon Expressway Company
- Length: 193.9 km (120.5 mi)
- Existed: July 16, 1963–present

Major junctions
- East end: Tōmei Expressway in Komaki, Aichi (35.3031°N 136.9072°E)
- West end: Kobe Route in Nishinomiya, Hyōgo (34.7273°N 135.3562°E)

Location
- Country: Japan

Highway system
- National highways of Japan; Expressways of Japan

The Meishin Expressway (名神高速道路, Meishin Kōsoku-dōro), or Nagoya-Kōbe Expressway 193.9 kilometres (120.5 mi) is a toll expressway in Japan. It runs from a junction with the Tōmei Expressway in Komaki, Aichi (outside Nagoya) west to Nishinomiya, Hyōgo (between Osaka and Kobe). It is the main road link between Osaka and Nagoya, and, along with the Tōmei Expressway, forms the main road link between Osaka and Tokyo. East of the Chūgoku Expressway near Osaka, it is part of Asian Highway Network ( AH1).

The part east of interchange 29 (Yōkaichi) is owned by the Central Nippon Expressway Company; the rest is owned by the West Nippon Expressway Company.

== History ==
The Meishin Expressway was the first expressway in Japan, with a section near Osaka and Kyoto opening on July 16, 1963.

The Meishin Expressway parallels the old Nakasendō between Kyoto and Nagoya, now Route 8 and Route 21. The Meihan National Highway is a mostly non-tolled freeway between Osaka and Nagoya, lying further south and built to lower standards. The Shin-Meishin Expressway is an under-construction route between Osaka and Nagoya, lying between the two other high-speed roads, that will connect to the Shin-Tōmei Expressway (via the Isewangan Expressway) and the Sanyō Expressway. It roughly parallels the old Tōkaidō (Route 1).

During the Great Hanshin earthquake of January 17, 1995, the Meishin Expressway suffered light damage but could only be used by emergency vehicles for weeks after the earthquake. It was the only remaining link between Osaka and Kobe for some time after the quake.

== List of interchanges and features ==
Interchanges not yet opened, closed, or abandoned are shown with a gray background. Exit numbers continue from the sequence of the Tomei Expressway.

- IC - interchange, SIC - smart interchange, JCT - junction, PA - parking area, SA - service area, TN - tunnel, BS - Bus stop (S - open, X - closed)

No.	Name	Connections	Dist. (km) from Tokyo	Bus Stop	Notes	Location	
Through to Tōmei Expressway
24	Komaki IC	National Route 41 (Meinō Bypass); Nagoya ExpresswayRoute 11 (Komaki Route)	346.7			Komaki	Aichi
BS	Iwakura Bus stop		350.7	X		Iwakura	Aichi
PA	Owari-Ichionomiya PA		353.2; 352.4			Ichinomiya	Aichi
25	Ichinomiya IC	National Route 22 (Meigi Bypass); Nagoya ExpresswayRoute 16 (Ichinomiya Route)	355.0			Ichinomiya	Aichi
25-1	Ichinomiya JCT	Tōkai-Hokuriku Expressway; Ichinomiya Nishikō Road (Planned)	359.4			Ichinomiya	Aichi
BS	Bisai Bus stop		362.9	X		Ichinomiya	Aichi
BR	Kisogawa Bridge				1,014 m (3,327 ft)	Ichinomiya	Aichi
BR	Kisogawa Bridge				1,014 m (3,327 ft)	Hashima	Gifu
PA	Hashima PA		366.0	X	PA: westbound only	Hashima	Gifu
25-2	Gifu-Hashima IC	Pref. Route 46 (Gifu-Hashima Interchange Route)	368.1			Hashima	Gifu
BR	Nagaragawa Bridge				630 m (2,070 ft)	Hashima	Gifu
BR	Nagaragawa Bridge				630 m (2,070 ft)	Anpachi	Gifu
BS	Ampachi Bus stop		371.3	X		Anpachi	Gifu
25-3	Ampachi SIC		371.6			Anpachi	Gifu
BR	Kisogawa Bridge				349 m (1,145 ft)	Anpachi	Gifu
BR	Kisogawa Bridge				349 m (1,145 ft)	Ogaki	Gifu
26	Ogaki IC	National Route 258	374.9	S		Ogaki	Gifu
26-1	Yoro JCT	Tōkai-Kanjō Expressway	378.5			Yoro	Gifu
BS	Yoroguchi Bus stop		379.6	X		Yoro	Gifu
26-2	Yoro SA/SIC		381.7			Yoro	Gifu
PA	Kami-Ishizu PA		388.1		westbound only abandoned on December 20, 2001	Ogaki	Gifu
27	Sekigahara IC	National Route 365	389.4			Sekigahara	Gifu
TN	Imasu Tunnel				eastbound: 380 m (1,250 ft) westbound: 400 m (1,300 ft)	Sekigahara	Gifu
TN	Sekigahara Tunnel				eastbound: 223 m (732 ft) westbound: 240 m (790 ft)	Sekigahara	Gifu
TN	Sekigahara Tunnel				eastbound: 223 m (732 ft) westbound: 240 m (790 ft)	Maibara	Shiga
BS	Santo Bus stop		396.8	X		Maibara	Shiga
PA	Ibuki PA		398.0; 398.8			Maibara	Shiga
BS	Maibara Bus stop		403.7	X		Maibara	Shiga
27-1	Maibara JCT	Hokuriku Expressway	405.5			Maibara	Shiga
TN	Maibara Tunnel				eastbound: 170 m (560 ft) westbound: 150 m (490 ft)	Maibara	Shiga
TN	Maibara Tunnel				eastbound: 170 m (560 ft) westbound: 150 m (490 ft)	Hikone	Shiga
TN	Hikone Tunnel				eastbound: 430 m (1,410 ft) westbound: 427 m (1,401 ft)	Hikone	Shiga
28	Hikone IC	National Route 306	413.4	X		Hikone	Shiga
SA	Taga SA		418.0	S		Taga	Shiga
PA	Kora PA		421.3	X	abandoned on September 29, 2005	Kora	Shiga
28-1	Koto-Sanzan PA/SIC	Pref. Route 344 (Koto-Sanzan Interchange Route)	424.6; 424.3	X		Aisho	Shiga
BS	Hyakusaiji Bus stop		428.2	S		Higashiomi	Shiga
29	Yokaichi IC	National Route 421; Pref. Route 327 (Koto-Yokaichi Route)	434.6	S		Higashiomi	Shiga
PA	Kuromaru PA		438.0			Higashiomi	Shiga
BS	Gamo Bus stop		440.4	X		Higashiomi	Shiga
29-1	Gamo SIC	Pref. Route 41 (Tsuchiyama Gamo Omihachiman Route)	441.2			Higashiomi	Shiga
BS	Ryuo Bus stop		443.6	X		Ryuo	Shiga
29-2	Ryuo IC	National Route 477	447.2			Ryuo	Shiga
PA	Bodaiji PA		451.7; 451.9	S		Konan	Shiga
BR	Yasugawa Bridge					Konan	Shiga
BR	Yasugawa Bridge					Ritto	Shiga
29-3	Ritto-Konan IC	Koka Konan Road	457.0		Koka Konan Road←→Nagoya: no access	Ritto	Shiga
30	Ritto IC	National Route 8 Yasu Ritto Bypass (planned); National Route 1 Pref. Route 55 (Kamitoyama Kamimagari Route)	458.2	X	Japan's first expressway route (to Amagasaki): opened on July 16, 1963	Ritto	Shiga
BS	Kusatsu Bus stop		461.7	X		Kusatsu	Shiga
30-1	Kusatsu JCT	Shin-Meishin Expressway Otsu Connection Route	464.4			Kusatsu	Shiga
PA	Kusatsu PA		465.6			Kusatsu	Shiga
PA	Kusatsu PA		465.6			Otsu	Shiga
30-2	Seta-higashi JCT/IC	Keiji Bypass (toll route); National Route 1 (Keiji Bypass free route)	467.5		westbound exit, eastbound entrance	Otsu	Shiga
30-2	Seta-nishi IC/Bus stop	Pref. Route 57 (Seta-nishi Interchange Route)	469.0	X	eastbound exit, westbound entrance	Otsu	Shiga
BR	Setagawa Bridge				500 m (1,600 ft)	Otsu	Shiga
31	Otsu IC/SA	Pref. Route 56 (Otsu Interchange Route)	474.6	X		Otsu	Shiga
TN	Otsu Tunnel				eastbound: 430 m (1,410 ft) westbound: 418 m (1,371 ft)	Otsu	Shiga
BR	Semimaru Bridge				62 m (203 ft)	Otsu	Shiga
TN	Semimaru Tunnel				eastbound: 387 m (1,270 ft) westbound: 376 m (1,234 ft)	Otsu	Shiga
32	Kyoto-higashi IC	Pref. Route 143 (Shinomiya Yotsuzuka Route, Sanjo Street); National Route 1 (Gojo Bypass); National Route 161 (Nishi-Otsu Bypass)	477.9			Yamashina-ku, Kyoto	Kyoto
BS	Yamashina Bus stop		481.0	X		Yamashina-ku, Kyoto	Kyoto
BS	Fukakusa Bus stop		486.0	S		Fushimi-ku, Kyoto	Kyoto
-	Kyoto-minami JCT	Second Keihan Highway			planned for 2021	Fushimi-ku, Kyoto	Kyoto
33	Kyoto-minami IC	National Route 1 (Keihan National Road)	487.6		entrances, westbound exit	Fushimi-ku, Kyoto	Kyoto
33-1	Kyoto-minami IC	National Route 1 (Keihan National Road)	487.6		eastbound 1st exit	Fushimi-ku, Kyoto	Kyoto
33-2	Kyoto-minami IC	National Route 1 (Keihan National Road)	487.6		eastbound 2nd exit	Fushimi-ku, Kyoto	Kyoto
BR	Katsuragawa Bridge					Fushimi-ku, Kyoto	Kyoto
PA	Katsuragawa PA		490.4			Fushimi-ku, Kyoto	Kyoto
33-3	Oyamazaki JCT/IC	Kyoto Jukan Expressway; Keiji Bypass; National Route 171	495.7	S	Left Route	Oyamazaki	Kyoto
TN	Tennozan Tunnel				eastbound Right Route: 1,718 m (5,636 ft) eastbound Left Route: 2,010 m (6,590 ft) westbound Right Route: 1,488 m (4,882 ft) westbound Left Route: 1,440 m (4,720 ft)	Oyamazaki	Kyoto
TN	Tennozan Tunnel				eastbound Right Route: 1,718 m (5,636 ft) eastbound Left Route: 2,010 m (6,590 ft) westbound Right Route: 1,488 m (4,882 ft) westbound Left Route: 1,440 m (4,720 ft)	Shimamoto	Osaka
TN	Kajiwara Tunnel				Kajiwara Daini Tunnel eastbound Right Route: 180 m (590 ft); Kajiwara Daini Tunnel eastbound Left Route: 180 m (590 ft); Kajiwara Daini Tunnel westbound Right Route: 150 m (490 ft); Kajiwara Tunnel westbound Left Route: 870 m (2,850 ft); Kajiwara Daiichi Tunnel eastbound Right Route: 740 m (2,430 ft); Kajiwara Daiichi Tunnel eastbound Left Route: 700 m (2,300 ft); Kajiwara Daiichi Tunnel westbound Right Route: 820 m (2,690 ft)	Shimamoto	Osaka
TN	Kajiwara Tunnel				Kajiwara Daini Tunnel eastbound Right Route: 180 m (590 ft); Kajiwara Daini Tunnel eastbound Left Route: 180 m (590 ft); Kajiwara Daini Tunnel westbound Right Route: 150 m (490 ft); Kajiwara Tunnel westbound Left Route: 870 m (2,850 ft); Kajiwara Daiichi Tunnel eastbound Right Route: 740 m (2,430 ft); Kajiwara Daiichi Tunnel eastbound Left Route: 700 m (2,300 ft); Kajiwara Daiichi Tunnel westbound Right Route: 820 m (2,690 ft)	Takatsuki	Osaka
PA	Sakurai PA		503.5		Abandoned in March 1998	Takatsuki	Osaka
11	Takatsuki JCT/IC	Shin-Meishin Expressway; Osaka Pref. Route 79 (Fushimi-Yanagitani-Takatsuki Route)	504.0			Takatsuki	Osaka
BS	Takatsuki Bus stop		506.3	S		Takatsuki	Osaka
34	Ibaraki IC	National Route 171	511.7	S		Ibaraki	Osaka
35	Suita JCT/IC	Chugoku Expressway; Kinki Expressway; Pref. Route 2 (Osaka Chuo Kanjosen)	514.5		Chugoku Expwy←→Nishinomiya: no access	Suita	Osaka
SA	Suita SA		517.8			Suita	Osaka
TN	Senriyama Tunnel				508 m (1,667 ft)	Suita	Osaka
TN	Senriyama Tunnel				508 m (1,667 ft)	Toyonaka	Osaka
36	Toyonaka IC	Hanshin Expressway Route 11 Ikeda Line; Pref. Route 10 (Osaka Ikeda Route)	524.5			Toyonaka	Osaka
BR	Inagawa Bridge					Amagasaki	Hyogo
37	Amagasaki IC	Pref. Route 13 (Amagasaki Ikeda Route)	529.4		Japan's first expressway route (to Ritto): opened on July 16, 1963	Amagasaki	Hyogo
BR	Mukogawa Bridge					Amagasaki	Hyogo
BR	Mukogawa Bridge					Nishinomiya	Hyogo
38	Nishinomiya IC	Hanshin Expressway Kobe Route (for Kobe); National Route 43	536.2			Nishinomiya	Hyogo
Meishin-Wangan Connection Route (planned)
