= Hitachinaka Road =

Road in Ibaraki Prefecture, Japan

Hitachinaka Road
- 常陸那珂道路

Route information
- Length: 2.9 km (1.8 mi) Tolled section
- Existed: 1999–present

Major junctions
- From: Hitachinaka Interchange in Hitachinaka, Ibaraki; National Route 245 / Higashi-Mito Road
- To: Hitachinaka Port Interchange in Hitachinaka, Ibaraki; Ibaraki Prefecture Route 6

Location
- Country: Japan

Highway system
- National highways of Japan; Expressways of Japan

The Hitachinaka Road (常陸那珂道路, Hitachinaka Dōro) is a 4-laned expressway-standard road in Hitachinaka, Ibaraki, Japan. The section from the origin to Hitachinaka Kaihin Kōen Interchange is a toll road operated by Ibaraki Prefecture Road Public Corporation, and the remaining section from Hitachinaka Kaihin Kōen Interchange to the terminus is a free road managed by Ibaraki Prefecture.

The road is officially designated as Ibaraki Prefecture Route 57, however it is functionally an extension of the Kita-Kantō Expressway and Higashi-Mito Road. As such it is classified as a road for motor vehicles only (自動車専用道路, Jidōsha Senyō Dōro) (motor vehicles must have a displacement of at least 125 cc) with the same design standard as other national expressways and is also signed E50 in conjunction with those routes under the Ministry of Land, Infrastructure, Transport and Tourism's "2016 Proposal for Realization of Expressway Numbering."

== Route description ==
As of April 2014 the fare on the tolled section is 100 yen for cars and 160 yen for large trucks and buses. Tolls are collected at 2 stations at Hitachinaka Interchange. Through traffic to and from the Higashi-Mito Road pay at a toll gate on the main route (managed by East Nippon Expressway Company), while traffic leaving and entering the Hitachinaka Road via the interchange use separate toll booths on the entrance/exit ramps (these toll booths do not accept ETC). The speed limit is 80 km/h.

== History ==
Construction on the toll road was completed on 22 July 1999. ETC collection systems were installed at the transition point of the toll road to Higashi-Mito Road In April 2014 tolls on large trucks increased by 10 yen to 160 yen for usage of the toll road.

== Junction list ==
The entire toll road is in Ibaraki Prefecture. The route is a direct extension of the Kita-Kantō Expressway. Therefore, the distance and exit numbers continue from the sequence of the Kita-Kantō Expressway and Higashi-Mito Road, starting at 90.8 kilometres (56.4 mi). TB = toll gate.

Location	km	mi	Exit	Name	Destinations	Notes
Through to Higashi-Mito Road
Hitachinaka	90.8	56.4	19/TB	Hitachinaka	National Route 245	Southern terminus; TB collects tolls for through traffic to Higashi-Mito Road; ETC payment isn't accepted on traffic entering or exiting from Route 245 to Hitachinaka Road
Hitachinaka	93.7	58.2	20	Hitachinaka Seaside Park	Ibaraki Prefecture Route 247 (Hitachinaka Seaside Park Route)	
Hitachinaka	95.3	59.2	21	Hitachinaka Port	Ibaraki Prefecture Route 6 (Mito Naka Minato Route)	Northern terminus
Through to Ibaraki Prefecture Route 62
1.000 mi = 1.609 km; 1.000 km = 0.621 mi: Route transition
