= Speed limits in Japan =

A standard sign indicating a speed limit of 60 km/h (37 mph) and a minimum speed limit of 50 km/h (31 mph)

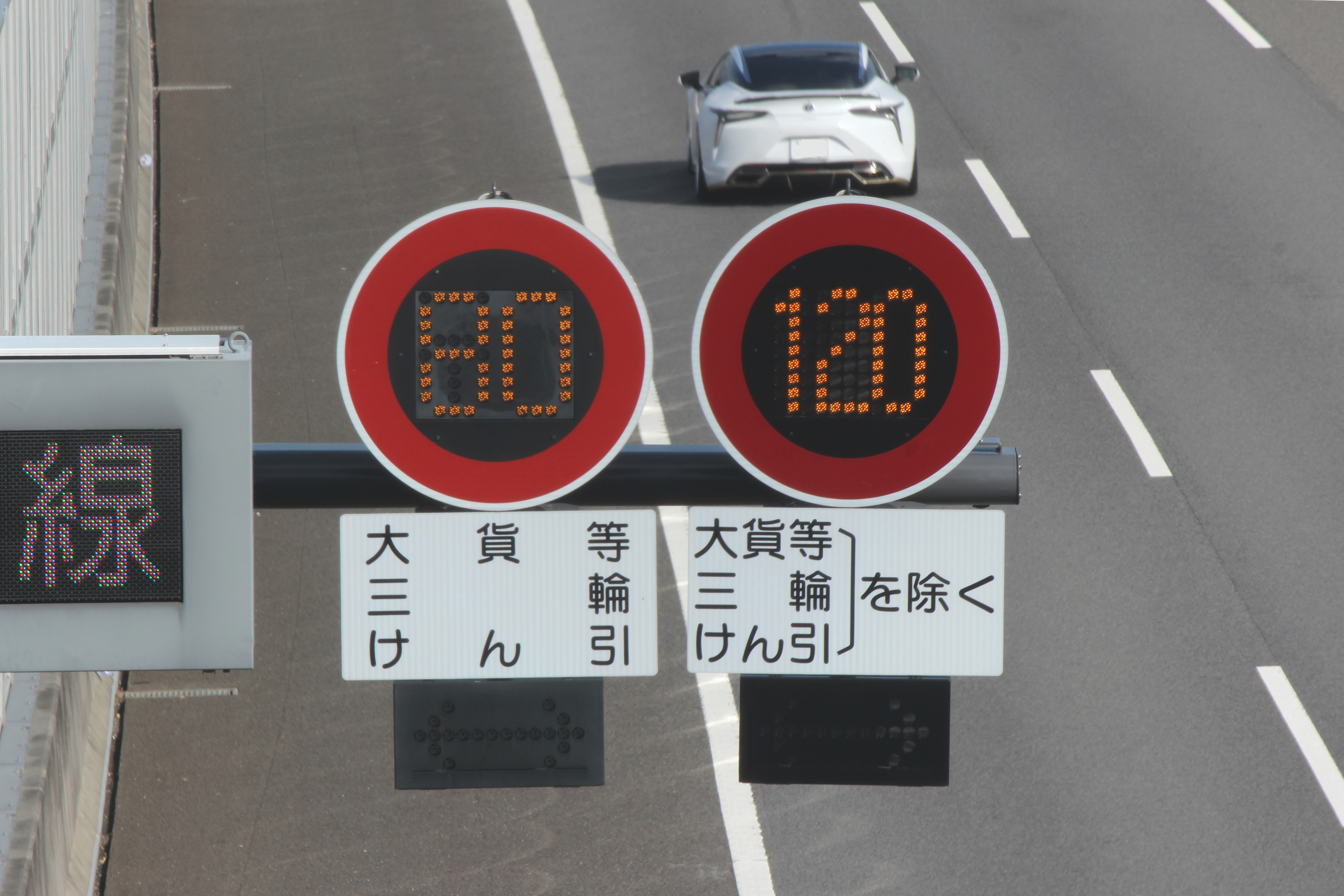
Variable speed limit signs used on expressways. Sign on the left denotes the limit for motor vehicles with a trailer, heavy trucks over 8 t and three wheelers

The highest speed limit in Japan is 120 km/h (75 mph), which applies to sections of the Shin-Tōmei Expressway (E1A) and Tōhoku Expressway (E4), as well as expressways in the Kantō Plain leading to Tokyo.

Where no speed limit is posted, the statutory default limit is 100 km/h (62 mph) on national divided expressways and 60 km/h (37 mph) on other roads. A lower statutory default of 30 km/h (19 mph) applies to roads without a center line or traffic lanes, where opposing directions of traffic are not physically separated. This effectively applies to most residential streets.

Certain vehicle types are subject to lower statutory speed limits on national divided expressways. The limit is 90 km/h (56 mph) for a truck with GVWR over 8 t (17,640 lb) and a maximum load over 5 t (11,020 lb), and 80 km/h (50 mph) for motor vehicles towing a trailer and for three-wheelers.

There are no separate statutory speed limits for urban and rural areas. The applicable limit is determined by the posted regulatory speed limit.

Implementation of speed limits in Japan can be summarized as:

- a statutory speed limit of 30 km/h applies to most residential streets.
- 40 km/h regulatory speed limits are common on urban two-lane roads with a marked center line.
- regulatory speed limit of 40 or 50 km/h is common in rural areas due to rugged mountainous terrain.
- the maximum regulatory speed limit in practice is 60 km/h on roads where at-grade intersections exist or pedestrians and cyclists are permitted.
- the maximum regulatory speed limit on undivided roads is 70 km/h.
- variable speed limits are in effect on most national expressways.
- emergency vehicles are not exempt but have speed limit of 80 km/h on most roads and 100 km/h on divided national expressways, unless higher speed limit is posted. Police vehicles are exempt during speeding enforcement.

== Enforcement ==
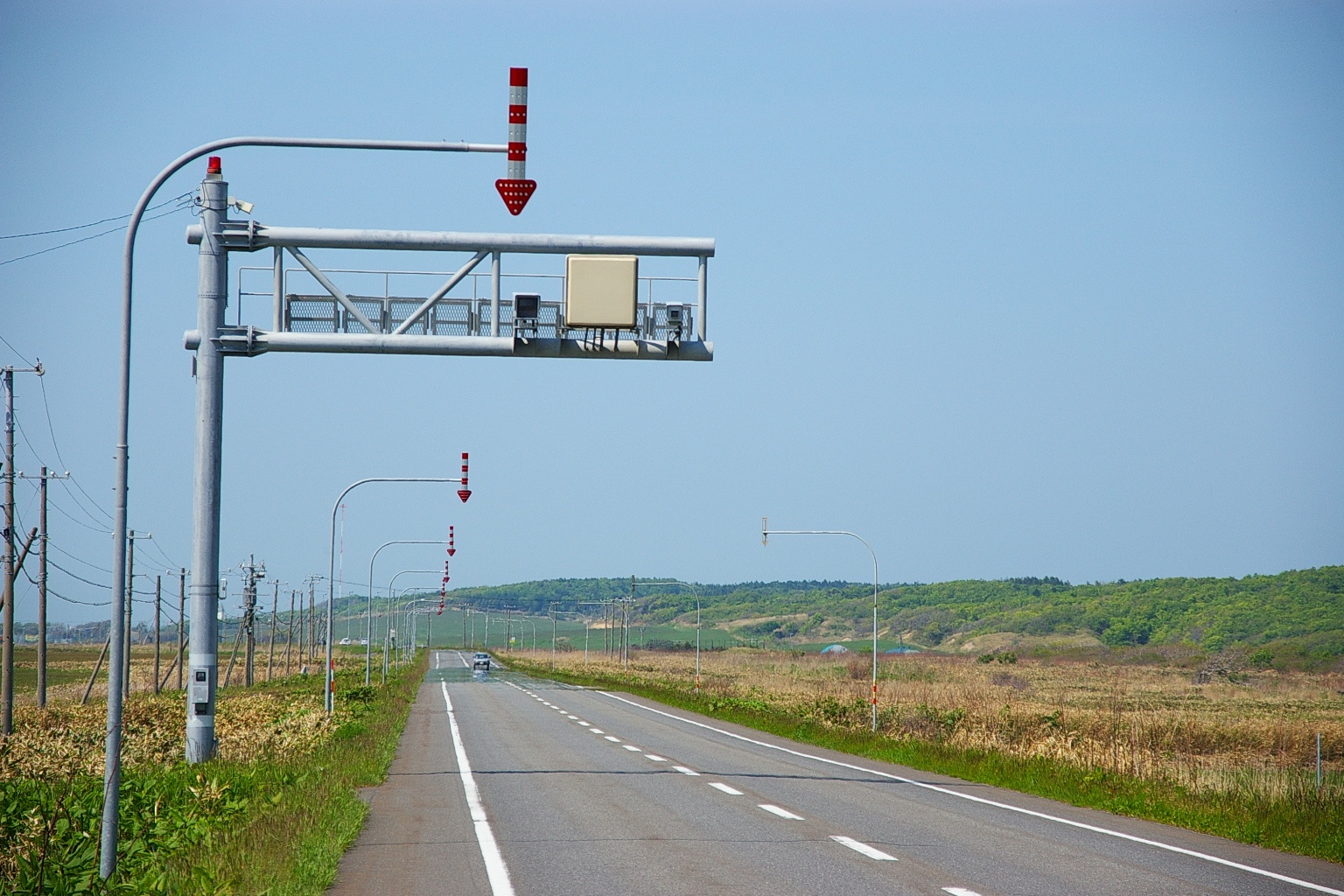
Speed camera installed on a rural street. The minimum threshold for the speed camera is 29 km/h (18 mph) but the speed limit cannot be set higher than 60 km/h (37 mph) as the street is not a controlled-access highway. The red and white arrows marks the road edges in snowy conditions.

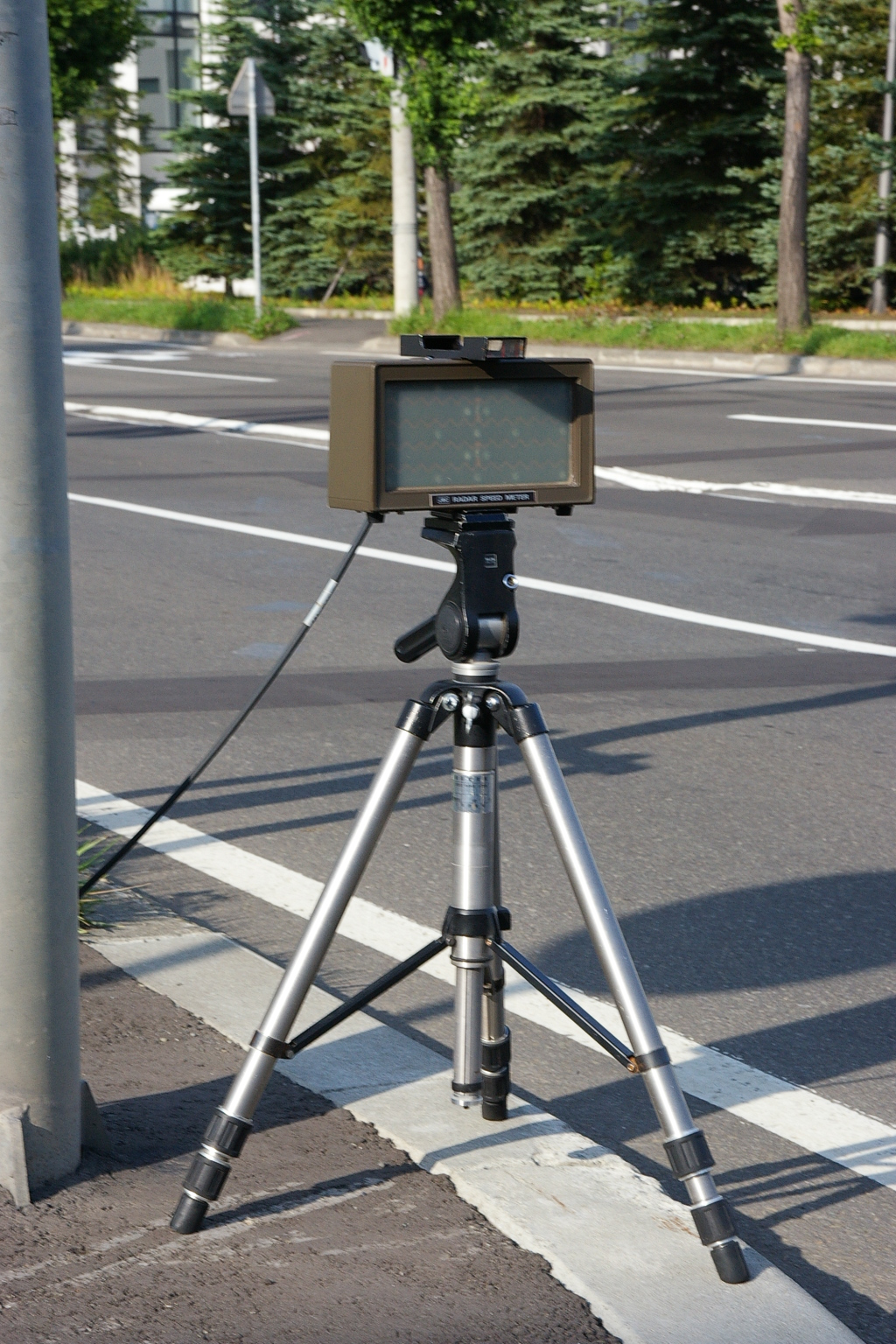
Radar unit used by police speed enforcement

=== Speed camera ===
A threshold for speed cameras in Japan is set at a minimum of 39 km/h (24 mph) above the limit on an expressway and a minimum of 29 km/h (18 mph) above the limit on other streets, where drivers will face criminal charges instead of traffic infractions. This is due to legal precedents dating back to 1969 restricting police from filming an individual unless a criminal offence is immediately being committed.

=== Police enforcement ===
Although there is no official tolerance for exceeding the speed limit, most drivers in Japan tend to drive over the speed limit on major roads. Police enforcement varies depending on the jurisdiction, officers, traffic flow and street types, but 19 km/h (12 mph) above the speed limit on an expressway and 14 km/h (8.7 mph) above the limit are generally tolerated on other streets.

In 2020, a total of 1,162,420 speeding tickets were issued across Japan, and only 199 tickets were issued for speeding between 0 and 14 km/h (0.0 and 8.7 mph) over the limit. Of the 199 tickets for speeding 0–14 km/h (0.0–8.7 mph) over the limit, Iwate Prefectural Police alone issued 166 tickets. For speeding between 15 and 19 km/h (9.3 and 11.8 mph) over the limit, Hokkaido, Aichi, Kyoto, Osaka and Fukuoka had the largest shares of tickets issued.

In contrast, Okinawa did not issue any tickets for speeding between 0 and 19 km/h (0 and 12 mph) over the limit. Tokyo Metropolitan Police issued a total of 68,693 speeding tickets, but gave out only seven tickets for speeding between 0 and 19 km/h (0 and 12 mph) over the limit. Some jurisdictions, such as Tokyo Metropolitan Police, release traffic enforcement locations on their websites.

== Speed limit criteria ==
Statutory speed limits provide the default limits, but posted regulatory speed limits are determined separately according to the design and use of the road. Japan distinguishes between surface streets (一般道路, ippan dōro) and expressways (高速道路, kōsoku dōro) in terms of speed limit regulations, with different criteria used to determine their regulatory speed limits.

Although some surface streets such as viaducts, trunk and bypass roads are built to expressway standards, many are not legally classified as expressways. They can generally be distinguished by the colour of direction signs: surface streets use blue direction signs while expressways use green signs.

=== Surface streets ===
Speed limits for surface streets are set within ±10 km/h (6.2 mph) of the reference speed limit below. Reference speed limits do not apply to expressways.

A speed limit may not exceed 60 km/h for streets with at-grade intersections or where pedestrians or cyclists are permitted. To exceed the 60 km/h threshold, the street must undergo costly grade separation to be a controlled-access highway.

Reference Speed Limit for Surface Streets
Class	Area	Travel Lanes	Divided	Pedestrian Volumes	85th Percentile Speed	Reference Speed Limit	Factors affecting the Reference Speed Limit (Reason for deviating from 85th speed)
1	Urban	2 lanes	-	High	51.9 km/h	40 km/h	Urban and high pedestrian volumes
2	Urban	2 lanes	-	Low	57.1 km/h	50 km/h	Urban
3	Urban	4+ lanes	Yes	High	59.0 km/h	50 km/h	Urban and high pedestrian volumes
4	Urban	4+ lanes	Yes	Low	64.1 km/h	60 km/h	Urban
5	Urban	4+ lanes	No	High	58.7 km/h	50 km/h	Urban, high pedestrian volumes, and undivided
6	Urban	4+ lanes	No	Low	63.9 km/h	50 km/h	Urban and undivided
7	Rural	2 lanes	-	High	58.2 km/h	50 km/h	High pedestrian volumes
8	Rural	2 lanes	-	Low	63.3 km/h	60 km/h	Maximum speed set by police
9	Rural	4+ lanes	Yes	High	65.3 km/h	60 km/h	Pedestrian
10	Rural	4+ lanes	Yes	Low	70.4 km/h	60 km/h	Maximum speed set by police
11	Rural	4+ lanes	No	High	65.0 km/h	50 km/h	High pedestrian volumes and undivided
12	Rural	4+ lanes	No	Low	70.1 km/h	60 km/h	Undivided
	Residential Streets Narrow streets primarily used by local residents, often without a sidewalk, where the safety of pedestrians and cyclists should be warranted over travel speed of vehicles.: Note: Not to set within ±10 km/h (6.2 mph)					30 km/h (±0 km/h)	20 km/h limit may be set on case-by-case basis for the following: Street has a higher percentage of vulnerable road users, such as seniors.; School zones, but only where specifically needed.; Strong requests from local residents.; Street not designed for motorized vehicles but still permitted due to unavoidable circumstances.
	Roads Structure Emphasizing the Traffic Function of Automobiles Ordinary roads (excluding expressways and motorways) that satisfy the following conditions: 1. Minimum design speed of 60 km/h 2. No at-grade intersection 3. Divided; and has low crash rates: Note: Not to set within ±10 km/h (6.2 mph)					70 km/h or 80 km/h (±0 km/h)	For speed limits 70 km/h and above, the road should be closed to pedestrians, cyclists, and mopeds in principle. Note: This criterion only applies to ordinary roads and does not apply to expressways and motorways. See Speed limits in Japan#Expressways for expressway adaptation speeds.
Definitions: Urban: DID (Densely Inhabited Districts), defined as at least two adjacent census districts with a population density of 4,000/km^{2} and a combined population greater than 5,000.; Rural: non-DID; Divided: Road must be separated by solid physical structures such as raised curb or fence. Roads divided by raised pavement markers or delineator posts are classified as "undivided".; High Pedestrian Volumes; Urban: 701 people/12 hr; Rural: 101 people/12 hr; Low Pedestrian Volumes; Urban: ≤ 700 people/12 hr; Rural: ≤ 100 people/12 hr

=== Expressways ===
Although the speed limit on a divided expressway is normally subject to a maximum of 100 km/h (62 mph), a limit of up to 120 km/h (75 mph) may be set if it has low crash rates, both the lowest adaptation speed and design speed are 120 km/h, and the qualifying section is at least 20 km (12 miles) long. On an undivided expressway, the maximum speed limit set is 70 km/h (43 mph).

Expressway speed limits are determined using the lowest applicable "structure compatible speed" (構造適合速度, kōzō tekigō sokudo) criteria below, which is based on factors such as design speed and road geometry. Unlike surface streets, expressways are not subject to fixed range such as ±10 km/h around a reference speed. Regulatory limits may exceed the statutory limit where permitted by the road's criteria.

Intercity expressways typically have higher speed limits, while urban expressways within major cities often have a speed limit of 60 km/h (37 mph). Two-lane expressways, which are typically found in rural and remote areas, commonly have speed limits of 70 km/h (43 mph) where opposing traffic is separated only by delineator posts or similar devices, and 80 km/h (50 mph) where opposing traffic is physically separated.

Most expressways outside cities have active variable speed limit signs, with lower limits applied during congestions, accidents, constructions, severe weather, and other adverse conditions. When the statutory limit applies, the variable speed limit signs are left blank. Where the regulatory limit exceeds the statutory limit, separate variable speed limit signs may be used to display the lower limits applicable to certain vehicle types, including vehicles towing trailers and three-wheeled vehicles.

The speed limit is determined by the lowest applicable speed among the criteria below. Consequently, some four-lane expressways also have speed limits as low as 70 km/h.

Curve Radius and Superelevation
Curve Radius (m)							Adaptation Speed	Design standard	Exceptional
Superelevation (%) Inclusive-Exclusive							Adaptation Speed	Design standard	Exceptional
0 - 1	1 - 2	2 - 3	3 - 4	4 - 5	5 - 6	6 - 7	Adaptation Speed	Curve radius (m)	
1134	1031	945	872	810	756	709	120 km/h	(710)	(570)
716	656	606	562	525	492	463	100 km/h	(460)	(380)
420	388	360	336	315	296	280	80 km/h	(280)	(230)
218	202	189	177	167	157	149	60 km/h	(150)	(120)
141	131	123	116	109	104	98	50 km/h	(100)	(80)
84	79	74	70	66	63	60	40 km/h	(60)	(50)
47	44	42	39	37	35	34	30 km/h	(30)	
21	20	19	17	17	16	15	20 km/h	(15)	

Sight Distance
Sight distance	Adaptation Speed
210 m ≤	120 km/h
160 m - 210 m	100 km/h
110 m - 160 m	80 km/h
75 m - 110 m	60 km/h
55 m - 75 m	50 km/h
40 m - 55 m	40 km/h
30 m - 40 m	30 km/h
< 30 m	20 km/h

Combined Superelevation/Slope Gradient
Combined Gradient	Adaptation Speed
Below 10%	120 km/h
10% but below 10.5%	80 km/h
Above 10.5% but below 11.5%	50 km/h

Road Slope
Slope	Adaptation Speed
5% and below	120 km/h
Above 5% but less than 6%	100 km/h
Above 6% but less than 7%	80 km/h
Above 7% but less than 8%	60 km/h
Above 8% but less than 9%	50 km/h
Above 9% but less than 10%	40 km/h

Lane Width
Width	Adaptation Speed
Above 3.5 m	120 km/h
Below 3.5 m	80 km/h

Shoulder Width
Width	Adaptation Speed
Above 1.75 m	120 km/h
Below 1.75 m	80 km/h
