= Kyoto-higashi Interchange =

Interchange in Kyoto, Japan

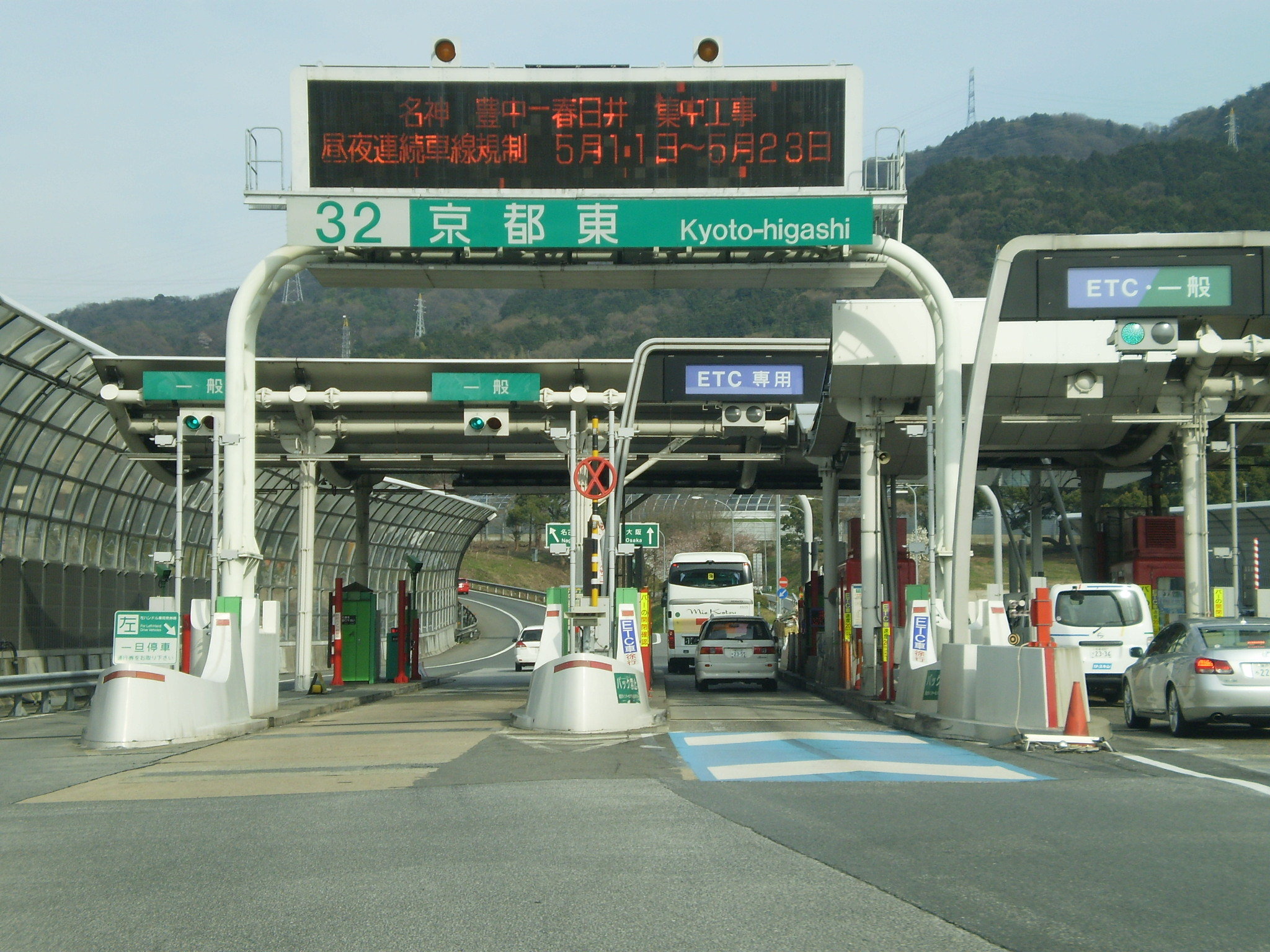

Location
- Yamashina-ku, Kyoto, Japan
- Coordinates: 34°59′17.6″N 135°50′11.7″E
- Roads at junction: Meishin Expressway

Construction
- Maintained by: West Nippon Expressway Company

The Kyoto-higashi Interchange (京都東インターチェンジ) is an interchange of the Meishin Expressway in Kyoto, Japan. This is located near the boundary with Otsu, Shiga.

In addition, it is directly connected to the Fujio-minami ramp of the Nishi-otsu Bypass.

== Roads ==
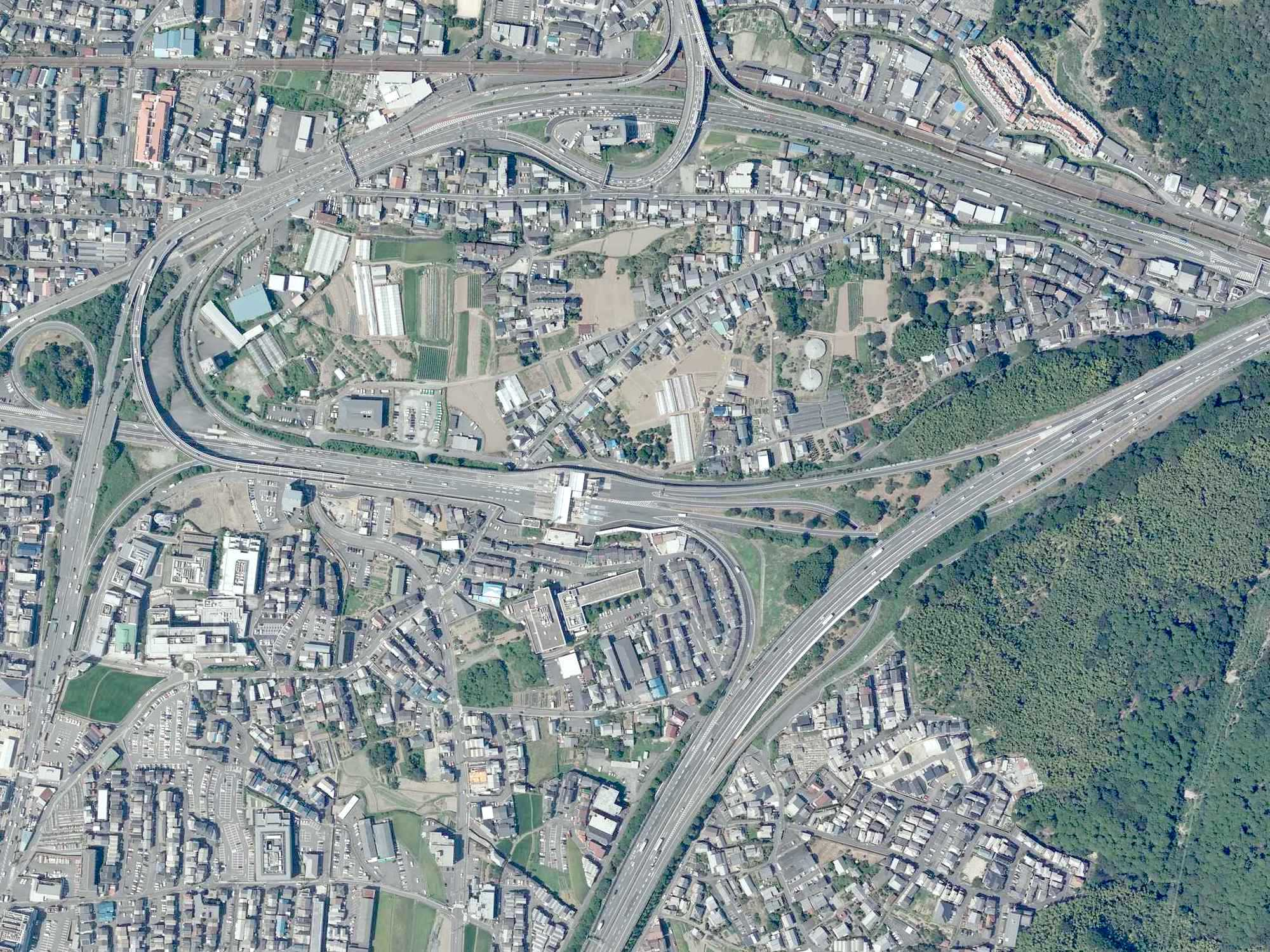
Aerial photograph

- Tōmei Expressway
- National Route 1
- National Route 8
- Nishi-otsu Bypass (National Route 161)
- Kyoto prefectural route 143

== History ==
The interchange opened on July 16, 1963. In the initial plan, it was planned as the eastern end of National Route 1 "Kyoto Bypass", and the connection with National Route 1 was also planned to be established in Otsu City Oiwake. It was designed as a "Otsu Interchange" because it was designed to span the Otsu city area. After that, the originally planned "Kyoto Bypass" was transferred to the Meishin Expressway, and a new Gojo Bypass was constructed, so it was planned that a connection with National Route 1 would be established in Kyoto City as well. Then, due to the linear problem at the time of connection, the plan was changed to a doorway only on the Kyoto city side, and a trumpet interchange that was different from the actual one was planned. However, the residents of Otsu City objected to the fact that the doorway was only facing Kyoto, and had to severely cut down the mountain due to construction costs, making it difficult to construct a trumpet interchange, Japan Highway Public Corporation has decided to radically review the plan. Due to this plan change, an interchange will be added to the Otsu service area, and the shape has also been changed to a Y-interchange.

== Around ==
- Yamashina Station
- Yamashina Mido
- Kiyomizu-dera
- Lake Biwa
