= Japan National Route 496 =

Road in Japan

National Route 496
- 国道496号
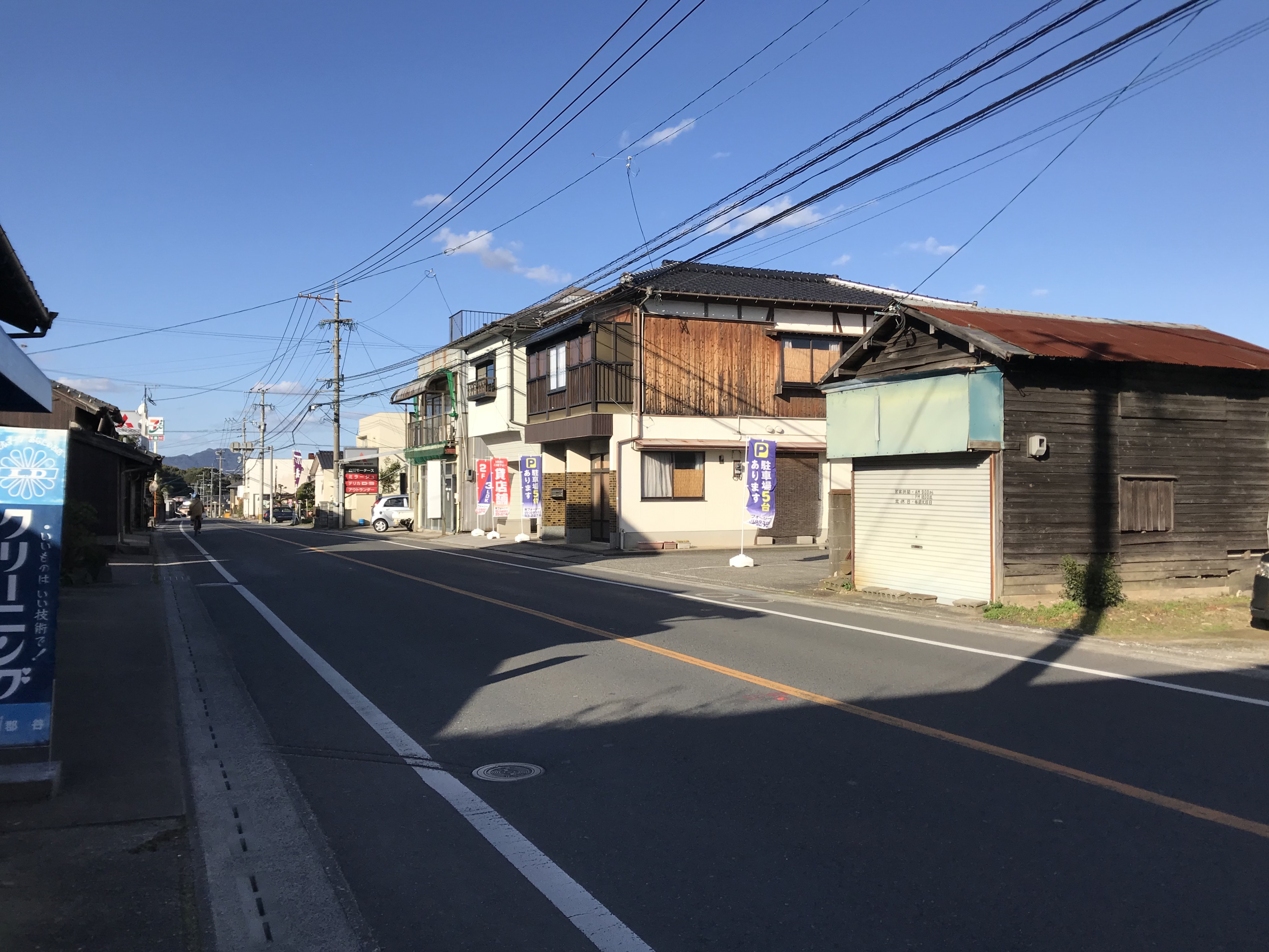

Route information
- Length: 68.9 km (42.8 mi)

Location
- Country: Japan

Highway system
- National highways of Japan; Expressways of Japan
← National Route 495	→ National Route 497

National Route 496 is a national highway of Japan connecting between Yukuhashi, Fukuoka and Hita, Oita in Japan, with total length has 68.9 km (42.8 mi).
