= Nishinomiya Interchange =

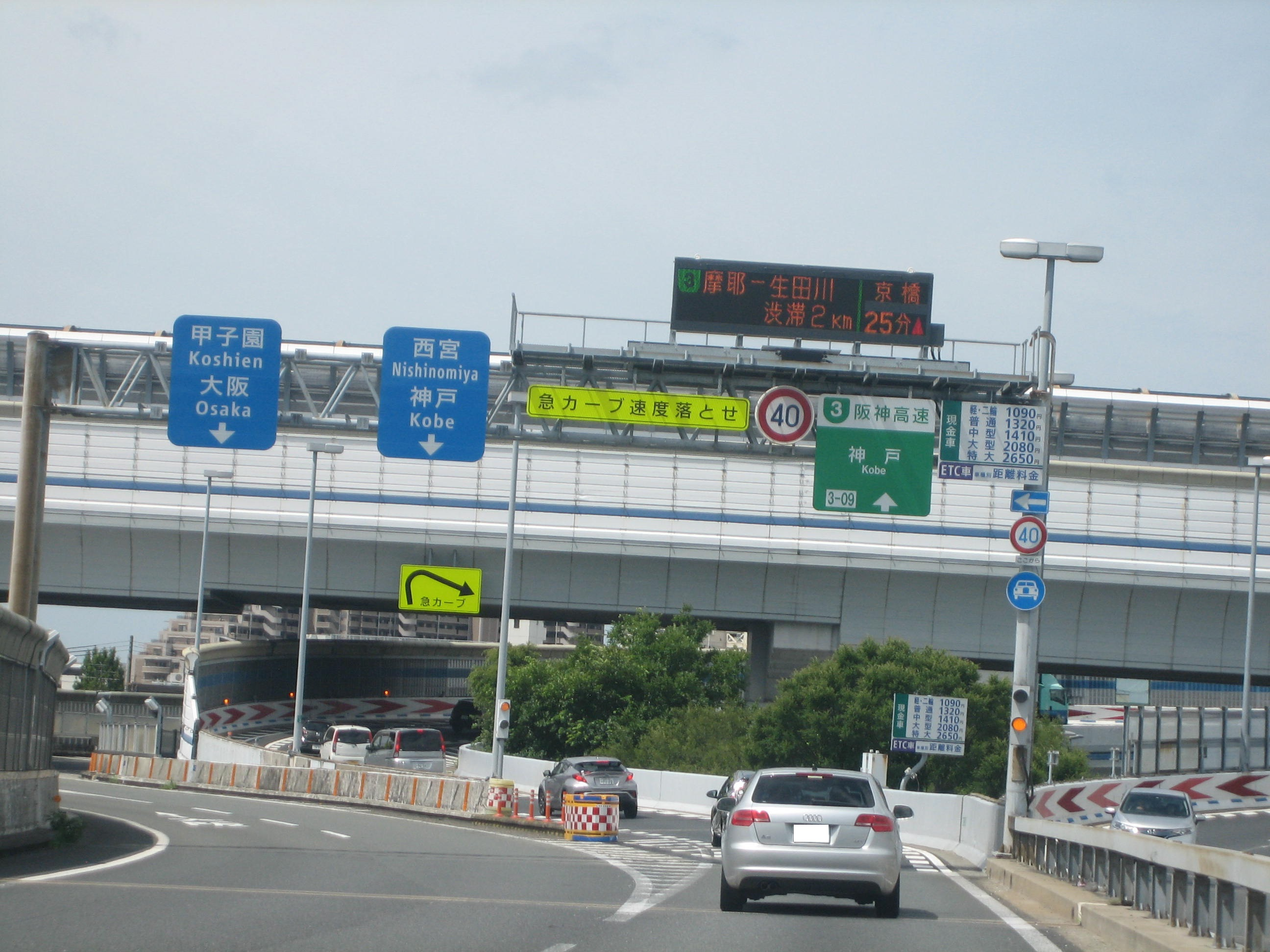
- Interactive map of Nishinomiya Interchange

Location
- Nishinomiya, Hyogo, Japan
- Coordinates: 34°43′35.8″N 135°21′17.7″E
- Roads at junction: Meishin Expressway; Hanshin Expressway Kobe Route

Construction
- Maintained by: West Nippon Expressway Company

The Nishinomiya Interchange (西宮インターチェンジ) is an interchange of the Hanshin Expressway Kobe Route in Nishinomiya, Hyōgo, Japan. This is the ending point of the Meishin Expressway.

When the Meishin Expressway was first opened, interchange numbers were assigned in order from Nishinomiya, and this interchange was number one.

A route connecting the Meishin Expressway and Hanshin Expressway Bayshore Route is planned as "Meishin-Wangan Connection Route", and Ministry of Land, Infrastructure, Transport and Tourism proposes a route connecting this Interchange and Bayshore Route near Nishinomiya-hama Interchange.

== Roads ==
- Meishin Expressway
- Hanshin Expressway Kobe Route (for Kobe)
- National Route 43

== History ==
- September 6, 1964: Nishinomiya Interchange opened on the Meishin Expressway
- February 23, 1970: Hanshin Expressway Kobe Route between Maya Interchange and Nishimiya Interchange was opened and connected.
- June 27, 1980: Hanshin Expressway Kobe Route between Awaza Junction and Nishinomiya was opened and connected.

== Around ==
- Nishinomiya Shrine
- Koshien Stadium
