= Japan National Route 498 =

National highway in Japan

National Route 498
- 国道498号
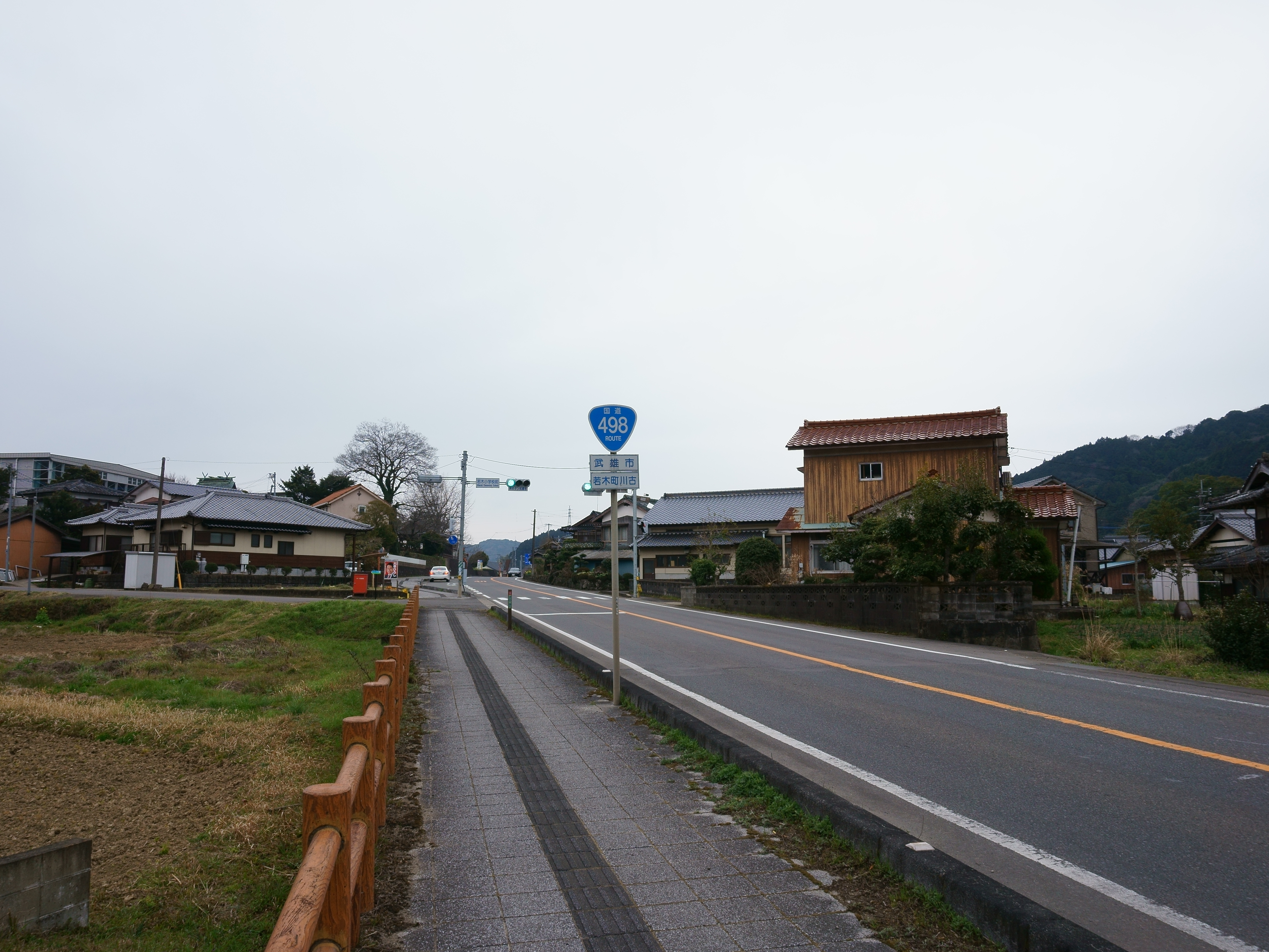

Route information
- Length: 56.6 km (35.2 mi)

Location
- Country: Japan

Highway system
- National highways of Japan; Expressways of Japan
← National Route 497	→ National Route 499

National Route 498 is a national highway of Japan connecting between Kashima, Saga and Sasebo, Nagasaki in Japan, with total length has 56.6 km (35.2 mi).
