= Japan National Route 499 =

Road in Japan

National Route 499
- 国道499号
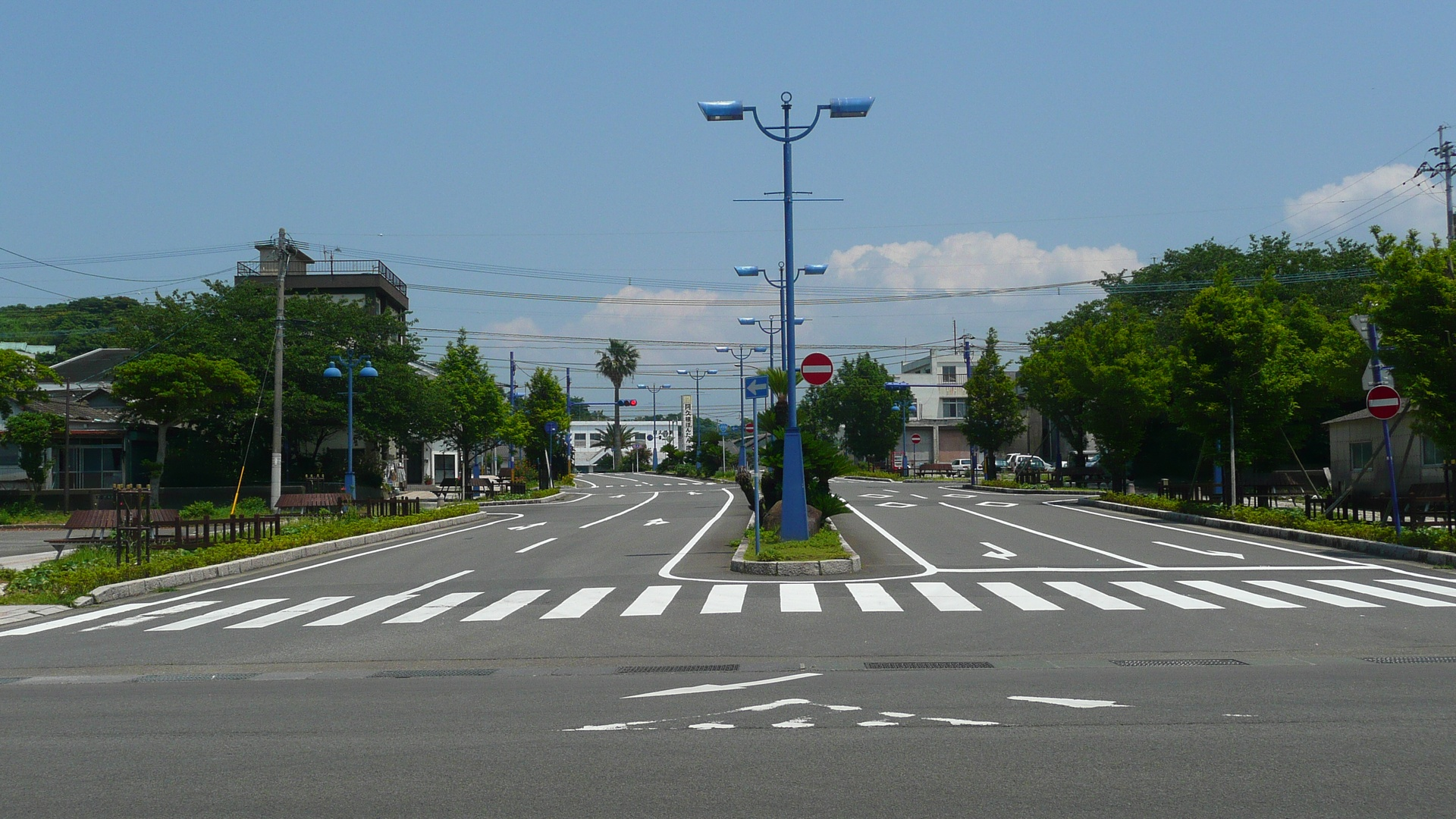

Route information
- Length: 27.7 km (17.2 mi)

Location
- Country: Japan

Highway system
- National highways of Japan; Expressways of Japan
← National Route 498	→ National Route 500

National Route 499 is a national highway of Japan connecting between nagasaki and Akune, Kagoshima on the island of Kyushu, with total length has 27.7 km (17.2 mi).
