= Higashi-Mito Road =

Road in Japan

Higashi-Mito Road
- 東水戸道路

Route information
- Length: 10.2 km (6.3 mi)
- Existed: 1996–present
- Component highways: National Route 6

Major junctions
- West end: Mito-minami Interchange in Mito, Ibaraki; Kita-Kantō Expressway; National Route 6
- East end: Hitachinaka Interchange in Hitachinaka, Ibaraki; Hitachinaka Road; National Route 245

Location
- Country: Japan

Highway system
- National highways of Japan; Expressways of Japan

The Higashi-Mito Road (東水戸道路, Higashimito Dōro) is a four-lane toll road in Ibaraki Prefecture, Japan. It is owned and operated by East Nippon Expressway Company.

== Route description ==
The route is officially designated as a bypass for National Route 6; however, it is functionally an extension from the eastern terminus of the Kita-Kantō Expressway. As such it is classified as a national highway for motor vehicles only with national expressway concurrency (高速自動車国道に並行する一般国道自動車専用道路, Kōsoku Jidōsha Kokudō ni Heikōsuru Ippan Kokudō Jidōsha Senyō Dōro) with the same design standard as other national expressways.

== History ==
The first section was opened to traffic in 1996. A bridge spanning the Naka River was completed in 1999, completing the route. The road was expanded from 2 to 4 lanes in 2000.

== Junction list ==
The entire expressway is in Ibaraki Prefecture. The sequence of kilometer posts and exits continue from the eastern terminus of the Kita-Kantō Expressway.

Location	km	mi	Exit	Name	Destinations	Notes
Mito	180.4	112.1	17	Mito-minami	National Route 6 (Mito Bypass) – Central Mito, Ōarai; Kita-Kantō Expressway west	E50 continues west as the Kita-Kantō Expressway
Mito	185.9	115.5	18	Mito-Ōarai	National Route 51 – Kashima, Ōarai, Kasama, Central Mito	
Naka River	187.6 188.1	116.6 116.9	Shinnakagawao Bridge			
Hitachinaka	190.6	118.4	19	Hitachinaka	National Route 245 – Hitachi, Central Hitachinaka, Kashima, Ōarai; Hitachinaka Road east – Hitachinaka Port	E50 continues east as Hitachinaka Road
1.000 mi = 1.609 km; 1.000 km = 0.621 mi
