= Fukuoka Expressway Circular Route =

Expressway in the Fukuoka area

Fukuoka Expressway Circular Route 福岡高速環状線

Route information
- Maintained by Fukuoka-Kitakyushu Expressway Public Corporation
- Length: 34.9 km (21.7 mi)
- Existed: 1983–present

Major junctions
- Beltway around Fukuoka

Location
- Country: Japan

Highway system
- National highways of Japan; Expressways of Japan

The Fukuoka Expressway Circular Route (福岡高速環状線, Fukuoka kōsoku kanjō-sen), also commonly known as the Circle Route, is a route of the Fukuoka Expressway system serving Fukuoka–Kitakyushu. The route runs through the city of Fukuoka and it is displayed as a "ring road" on information signs. Although it was once referred to as the city high ring road, it is now generally dubbed as the "ring road".

== History ==
The expressway was built between 1983 and 2012.
