= Kita-Kantō Expressway =

4-landed national expressway in Kita-Kantō region, Japan

Kita-Kantō Expressway
- 北関東自動車道

Route information
- Length: 87.3 km (54.2 mi)
- Existed: 2000–present

Major junctions
- From: Takasaki Junction in Takasaki, Gunma; Kan-Etsu Expressway
- To: Mito-minani Interchange in Mito, Ibaraki; Higashi-Mito Road; National Route 6

Location
- Country: Japan
- Major cities: Maebashi, Isesaki, Ōta, Shimotsuke, Utsunomiya, Mooka, Sakuragawa, Kasama

Highway system
- National highways of Japan; Expressways of Japan

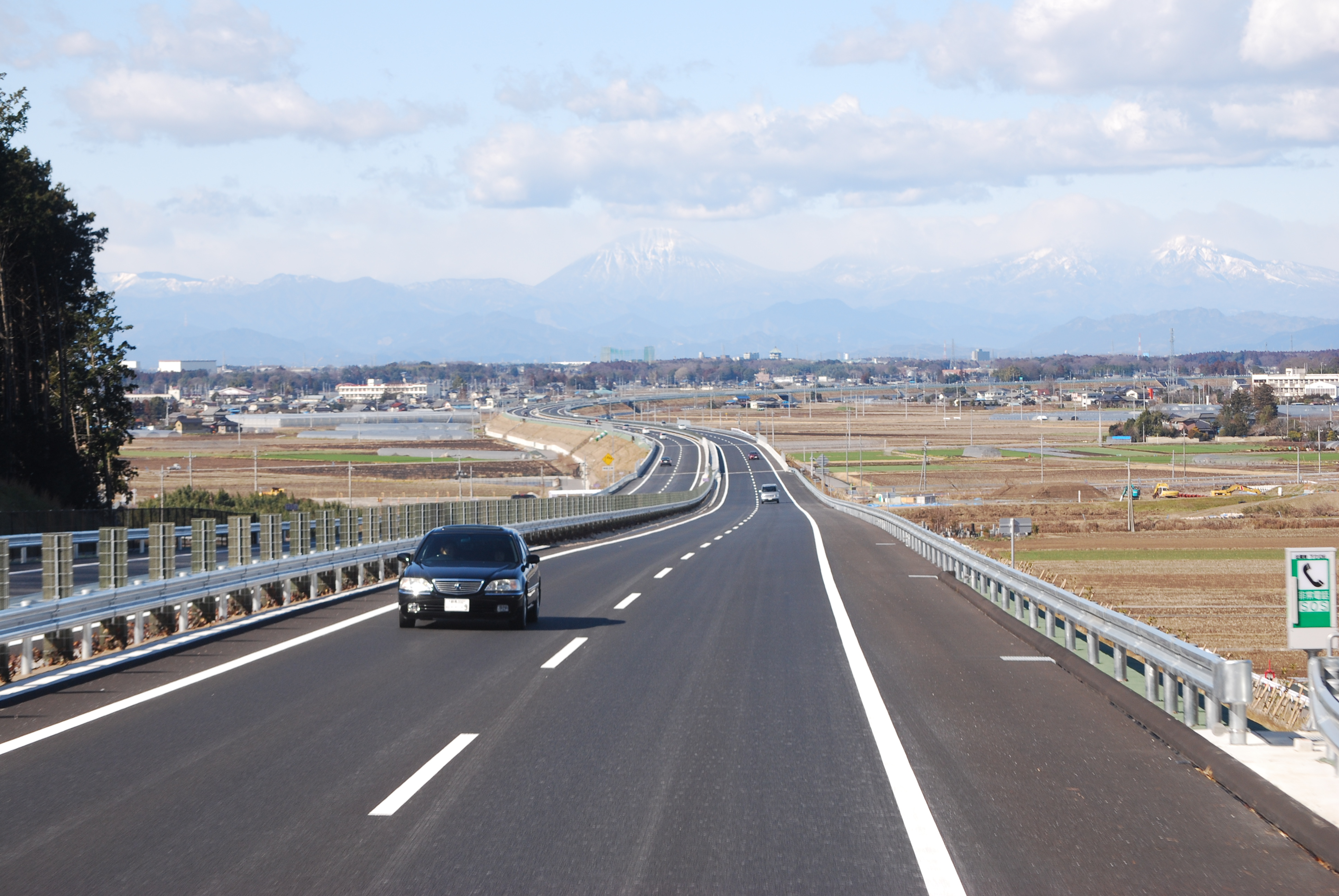
Expressway and Mt. Nikko

The Kita-Kantō Expressway (北関東自動車道, Kita-Kantō Jidōsha-dō) (lit. North Kantō Expressway) is a 4-laned national expressway in Japan. It is owned and operated by East Nippon Expressway Company.

== Overview ==
The route connects the capitals of the three northern prefectures in the Kantō region: Maebashi, Utsunomiya, and Mito.

The expressway begins at a junction with the Kan-etsu Expressway in Gunma Prefecture and heads east along the southern edge of the prefecture. The route ends abruptly in the city of Ōta, however the route will be extended to a junction with the Tōhoku Expressway in Tochigi Prefecture by 2011. The expressway then follows the route of the Tōhoku Expressway northward for about 13 km, then diverges from this expressway following an easterly course once more. It runs through the southern areas of Utsunomiya and heads into eastern areas of Tochigi Prefecture, where the route terminates once again in the city of Mooka. The section connecting Tochigi and Ibaraki Prefectures was scheduled to be completed in 2009. From Sakuragawa in western Ibaraki, the route continues towards a junction with the Jōban Expressway and runs along the southern edge of the Mito city area, where the expressway has its final terminus. At the terminus, the Higashi-Mito Road continues towards the Pacific Ocean coastline using the same roadway.

The route runs parallel to National Route 50 for most of its length.

== List of interchanges and features ==
- IC - interchange, SIC - smart interchange, JCT - junction, SA - service area, PA - parking area, BR - bridge

| Prefecture | Location | km | mi | Exit | Name | Destinations | Notes |
|---|---|---|---|---|---|---|---|
| Gunma | Takasaki | 0.0 | 0.0 | 9-2 | Takasaki JCT | Kan-etsu Expressway | Roadway continues as Kan-etsu Expressway |
| Gunma | Takasaki | | | Tonegawa Bridge over the Tone River | | | |
| Gunma | Maebashi | 3 | 1.9 | 1 | Maebashi-minami IC | Prefecture Route 11 (Maebashi Tamamura Route) | |
| Gunma | Maebashi | 7.5 | 4.7 | 2 | Komagawa IC | Prefecture Route 2 (Maebashi Tatebayashi Route) | |
| Gunma | Isesaki | 11.7 | 7.3 | 2-1; PA | Hashie PA/SIC | | Convenience store attached |
| Gunma | Isesaki | 14.5 | 9.0 | 3 | Isesaki IC | National Route 17 | |
| Gunma | Ōta | 19.9 | 12.4 | 4 | Ōta-Yabuzuka IC | Prefecture Route 315 (Ōhara Sakai Mitsugi Route) | |
| Gunma | Ōta | 26.6 | 16.5 | 4-1; PA | Ōta-Gōdo PA/SIC | | Gas station attached |
| Gunma | Ōta | 30.5 | 19.0 | 5 | Ōta-Kiryū IC | National Route 122 | |
| Tochigi | Ashikaga | 34.3 | 21.3 | - | Ashikaga SIC | | Scheduled to open in 2028 |
| Tochigi | Ashikaga | 40.8 | 25.4 | 6 | Ashikaga IC | National Route 293 | |
| Tochigi | Ashikaga | 47 | 29 | 6-1; PA | Izuruhara PA/SIC | Prefecture Route 175 (Yamagata Teraoka Route) | |
| Tochigi | Sano | 49.1 | 30.5 | 7 | Sano-Tanuma IC | Prefecture Route 347 | |
| Tochigi | Tochigi | 54.4 | 33.8 | 7-1 | Iwafune JCT | Tōhoku Expressway | |
| Tochigi | Tochigi | 68 | 42 | 8-1 | Tochigi-Tsuga JCT | Tōhoku Expressway | |
| Tochigi | Tochigi | 71.8 | 44.6 | 8 | Tsuga IC | Prefecture Route 3 (Utsunomiya Kamewada Tochigi Route) | |
| Tochigi | Mibu | 76.6 | 47.6 | PA | Mibu PA | | |
| Tochigi | Mibu | 78.1 | 48.5 | 9 | Mibu IC | Prefecture Route 71 | Hanyūda Kamikamou Route |
| Tochigi | Shimotsuke | 82.3 | 51.1 | - | Shimotsuke SIC | | Expected to open FY2025 |
| Tochigi | Utsunomiya | 86.5 | 53.7 | 10 | Utsunomiya-Kaminokawa IC | National Route 4 | |
| Tochigi | Mooka | 94.2 | 58.5 | 11 | Mooka IC | National Route 408 | |
| Tochigi | Mooka | | | - | Gogyo River PA | | (Provisional name) |
| Ibaraki | Sakuragawa | 108.9 | 67.7 | 12 | Sakuragawa-Chikusei IC | National Route 50 | |
| Ibaraki | Kasama | 117.8 | 73.2 | 13 | Kasama-nishi IC | Prefecture Route 64 | Tsuchiura Kasama Route Bypass |
| Ibaraki | Kasama | 125.5 | 78.0 | PA | Kasama PA/SIC | | |
| Ibaraki | Kasama | 126.9 | 78.9 | 14 | Tomobe IC | National Route 355 Prefecture Route 16 (Ōarai Tomobe Route) | |
| Ibaraki | Kasama | 134.3 | 83.5 | 8-2 | Tomobe JCT | Jōban Expressway | |
| Ibaraki | Ibaraki | 138.4 | 86.0 | 15 | Ibarakimachi-nishi IC | Prefecture Route 59 (Tamari Mito Route) | |
| Ibaraki | Ibaraki | 140.6 | 87.4 | 15-1 | Ibaraki JCT | Higashi-Kantō Expressway | |
| Ibaraki | Ibaraki | 145.2 | 90.2 | 16 | Ibarakimachi-higashi IC | National Route 6 | |
| Ibaraki | Mito | 148.6 | 92.3 | 17 | Mito-minami IC | National Route 6 | |
Through to Higashi-Mito Road
1.000 mi = 1.609 km; 1.000 km = 0.621 mi: Concurrency terminus; Electronic toll collection; Proposed
