= Urban Expressways (Japan) =

Road system in many Japanese urban areas

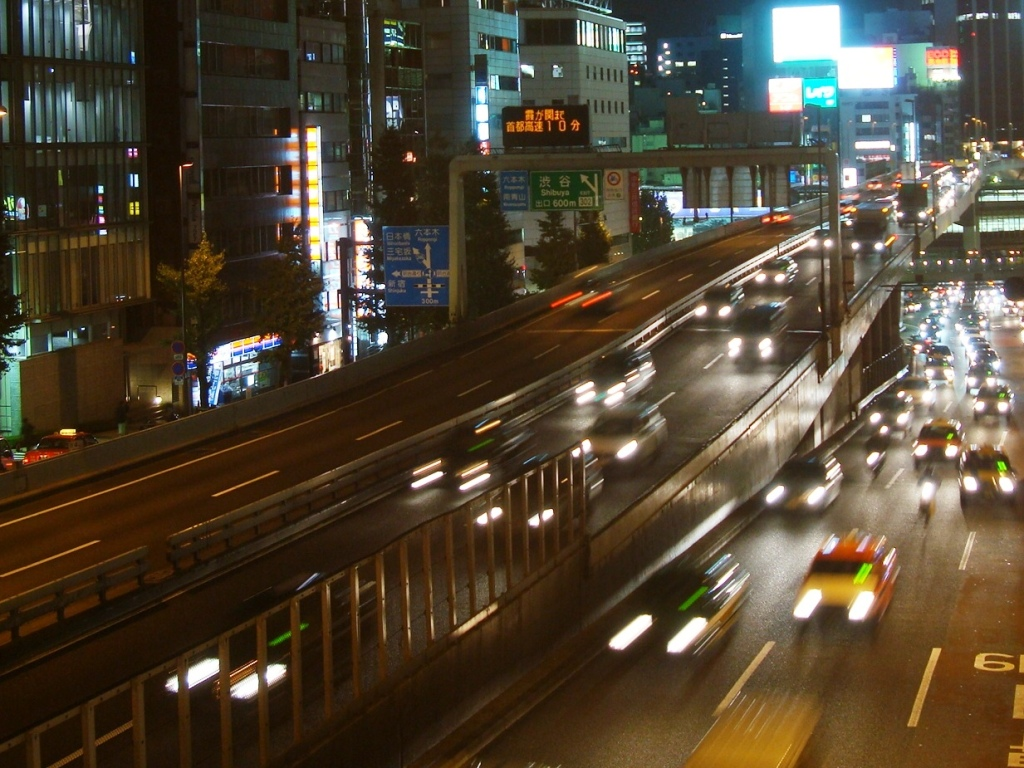
Shuto Expressway in Tokyo

Urban expressways (都市高速道路, Toshi Kōsokudōro) are intra-city expressways which are found in many of Japan's largest urban areas. Due to lack of space many of these expressways are constructed as viaducts running above local roads. The two largest networks are the Shuto Expressway in the Tokyo area and the Hanshin Expressway in the Osaka area. There are other smaller networks in Nagoya, Hiroshima, Kitakyūshū, and Fukuoka. Each network is managed separately from each other (the Fukuoka and Kitakyūshū Expressways are managed by the same company but are not physically connected to each other).

Currently half of the tolled urban expressways operate on a flat-rate toll system (the toll is the same regardless of the distance travelled on the network), however the Shuto Expressway, Hanshin Expressway and Nagoya Expressway have moved to a distance-based toll system for vehicles equipped with ETC. Vehicles travelling on these roads not equipped with ETC, must now pay the maximum toll achievable from the entrance the vehicle enters from.

== Urban Expressways in Japan ==
- Shuto Expressway
- Tokyo Expressway (Interconnected to the Shuto Expressway on both ends. Toll free.)
- Hanshin Expressway
- Nagoya Expressway
- Fukuoka Expressway
- Hiroshima Expressway
- Kitakyūshū Expressway
