= Central Nippon Expressway Company =

Japanese road maintenance company

Central Nippon Expressway Company Limited

- Map of Nexco System territories. Central Nippon is shown in orange.
- Native name: 中日本高速道路株式会社
- Romanized name: Naka-nihon Kōsoku-dōro Kabushiki-gaisha
- Company type: State-owned KK
- Industry: Expressway management
- Predecessor: Japan Highway Public Corporation
- Founded: October 1, 2005; 20 years ago
- Headquarters: Nagoya, Japan
- Areas served: Tōkai and Hokuriku regions
- Key people: Yoshihito Miyaike (President and CEO)
- Owner: Government of Japan
- Number of employees: 9,804 (2019)
- Parent: Japan Expressway Holding and Debt Repayment Agency (Ministry of Land, Infrastructure, Transport and Tourism)
- Website: www.c-nexco.co.jp

The Central Nippon Expressway Company Limited (中日本高速道路株式会社, Naka-nihon Kōsoku-dōro Kabushiki-gaisha), abbreviated as NEXCO Central (NEXCO中日本, NEXCO Naka-Nihon), is one of the main operators of expressways and toll roads in Japan. It is headquartered in Nagoya, Aichi Prefecture.

The company was established on October 1, 2005 as a result of the privatization of Japan Highway Public Corporation. The company manages roadways mainly in the Tōkai and Hokuriku regions. Roadways in other regions of Japan are managed by East Nippon Expressway Company and West Nippon Expressway Company.
