= Fukuoka-Kitakyushu Expressway Public Corporation =

Japanese road maintenance company

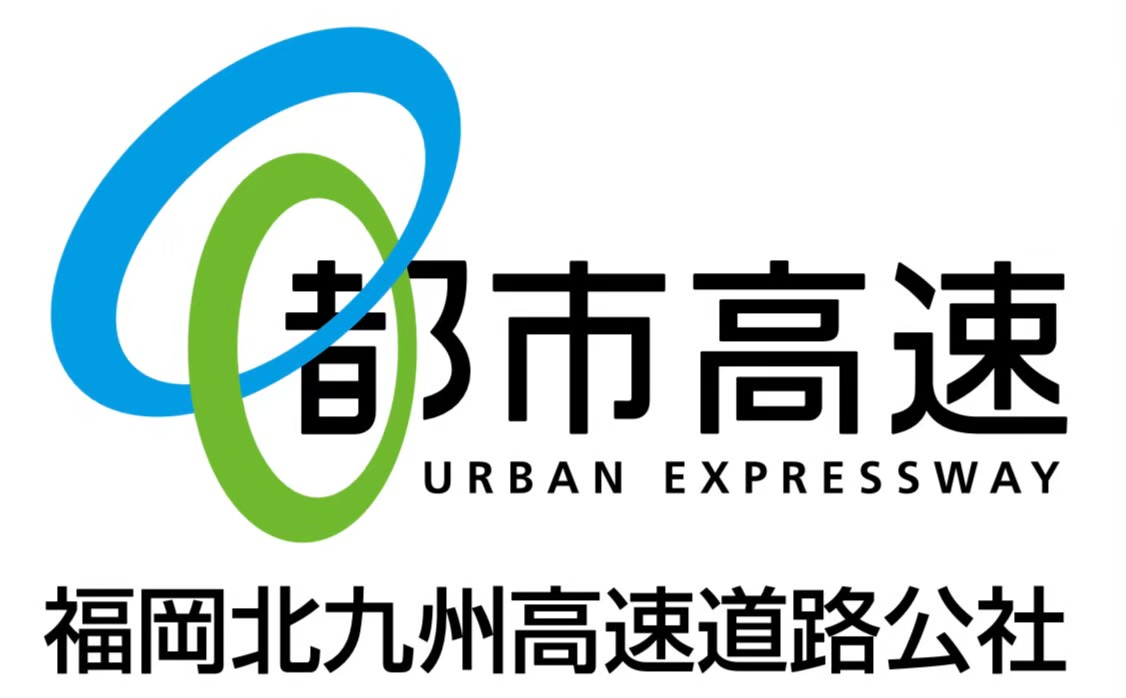
Fukuoka-Kitakyushu Expressway Public Corporation logo

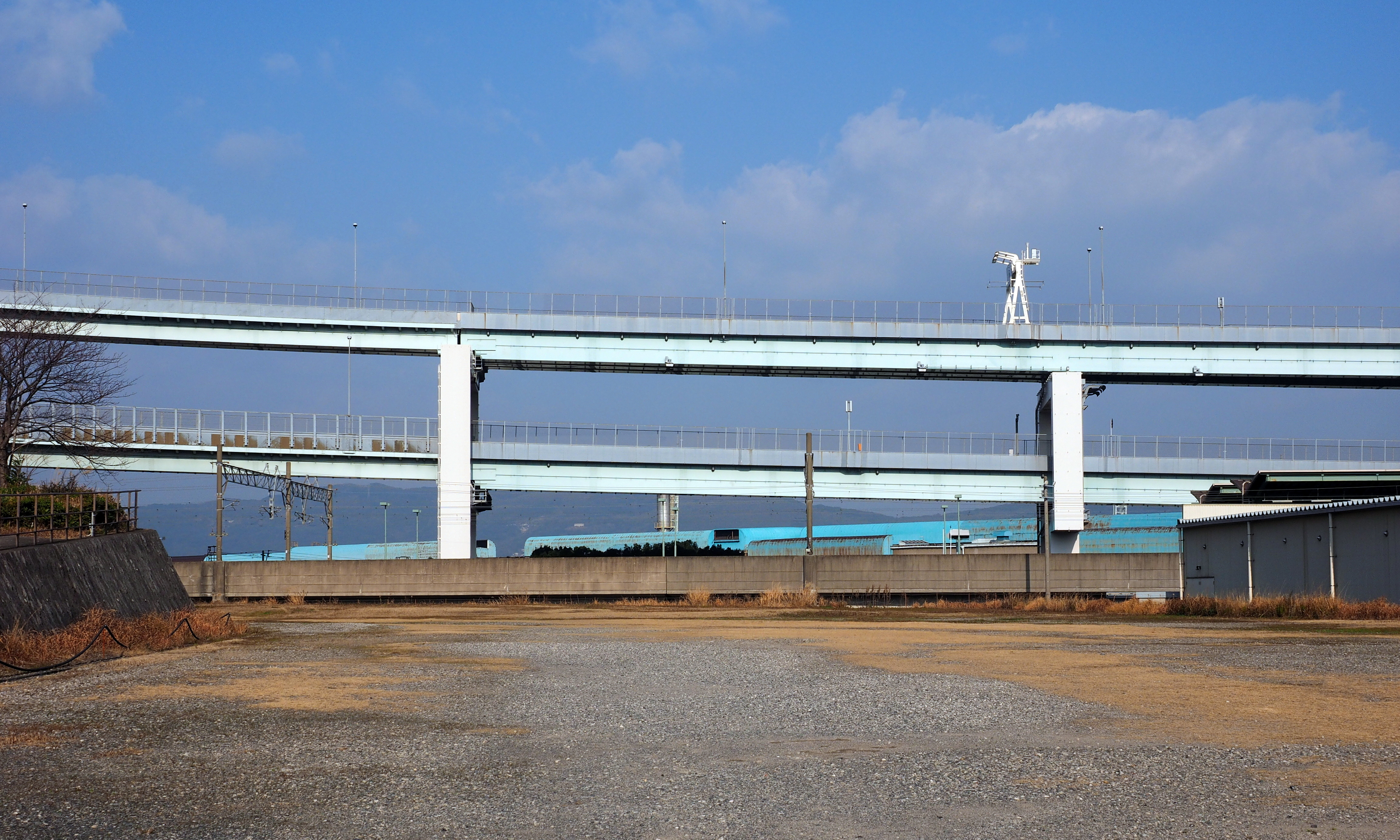
An elevated section of the Kitakyushu Expressway in Yahatahigashi-ku, Kitakyushu

The Fukuoka-Kitakyushu Expressway Public Corporation (福岡北九州高速道路公社, Fukuoka-kitakyūshū-kōsoku-dōro-kōsha) owns and maintains the Fukuoka and Kitakyūshū expressways in Fukuoka Prefecture, Japan. It is headquartered in Higashi-ku, Fukuoka, Fukuoka Prefecture. The company was established on November 1, 1971 to manage the urban expressways built in the Fukuoka and Kitakyūshū areas.

== Routes ==
=== Fukuoka Expressways ===
- Fukuoka Expressway Circular Route
- Route 1 Kashi Line
- Route 2 Dazaifu Line
- Route 3 Airport Line
- Route 4 Kasuya Line
- Route 6 Island City Line

=== Kitakyushu Expressways ===
- Route 1
- Route 2
- Route 3
- Route 4
- Route 5
