= Japan Highway Public Corporation =

Former government agency in Japan

- Logo used from 1991 until 2005
- Native name: 日本道路公団
- Romanized name: Nihon Dōro Kōdan
- Type: Statutory corporation
- Founded: April 16, 1956; 70 years ago in Kasumigaseki, Tokyo, Japan
- Defunct: October 1, 2005
- Fate: Corporatized and separated into three state-owned companies
- Successors: Central Nippon Expressway Company; East Nippon Expressway Company; West Nippon Expressway Company
- Headquarters: Kasumigaseki, Tokyo, Japan
- Key people: Takeshi Kondo (last CEO)
- Revenue: ▲¥2,108,914 million (2004)
- Net income: ▼¥1,344 million (2004)
- Owner: Government of Japan
- Number of employees: 8,500 (2004)
- Website: www.jhnet.go.jp

Japan Highway Public Corporation (日本道路公団, Nihon Dōro Kōdan), or JH, was a public company established after World War II to construct and manage highway networks in Japan, founded in 1956.

On October 1, 2005, JH was divided into three private enterprises, East Nippon Expressway Company Limited (NEXCO East), Central Nippon Expressway Company Limited (NEXCO Central), and West Nippon Expressway Company Limited (NEXCO West).
