= East Nippon Expressway Company =

Japanese road maintenance company

East Nippon Expressway Company Limited

- Map of Nexco System territories. East Nippon is shown in green.
- Native name: 東日本高速道路株式会社
- Romanized name: Higashi-nihon Kōsoku-dōro Kabushiki-gaisha
- Type: State-owned KK
- Industry: Fixed facilities for road transport
- Predecessor: Japan Highway Public Corporation
- Founded: October 1, 2005; 20 years ago
- Headquarters: Kasumigaseki, Chiyoda, Tokyo, Japan
- Area served: Kantō, Tōhoku and Hokkaido
- Key people: Hiroshi Hirose (President and CEO)
- Owner: Government of Japan
- Number of employees: 2,216 (2016)
- Parent: Japan Expressway Holding and Debt Repayment Agency (Ministry of Land, Infrastructure, Transport and Tourism)

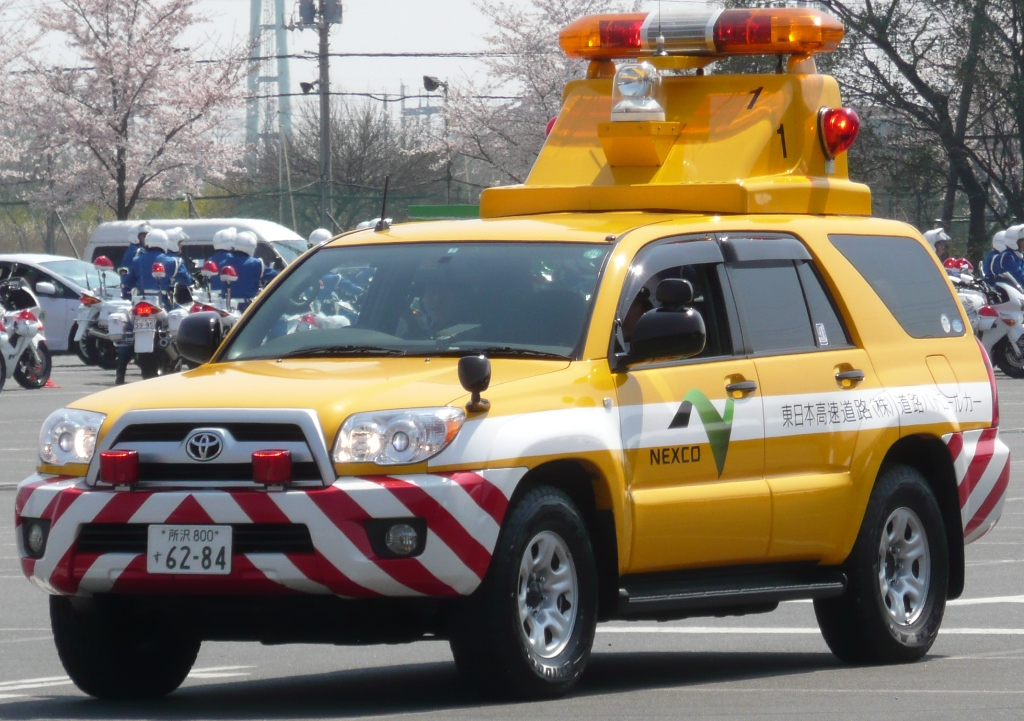
Toyota Hilux Surf NEXCO East Japan patrol car.

The East Nippon Expressway Company Limited (東日本高速道路株式会社, Higashi-nihon Kōsoku-dōro Kabushiki-gaisha), abbreviated as NEXCO East (NEXCO東日本, NEXCO Higashi-Nihon), is one of the main operators of expressways and toll roads in Japan. It is headquartered in Kasumigaseki, Chiyoda, Tokyo.

The company was established on October 1, 2005 as a result of the privatization of Japan Highway Public Corporation. The company manages roadways mainly in the Kantō and Tōhoku regions as well as on Hokkaido. Roadways in other regions of Japan are managed by Central Nippon Expressway Company and West Nippon Expressway Company.
