= West Nippon Expressway Company =

Japanese road maintenance company

West Nippon Expressway Company Limited

- Map of Nexco System operations. West Nippon is shown in blue.
- Native name: 西日本高速道路株式会社
- Romanized name: Nishi-nihon Kōsoku-dōro Kabushiki-gaisha
- Company type: State-owned KK
- Industry: Fixed facilities for road transport
- Predecessor: Japan Highway Public Corporation
- Founded: October 1, 2005; 20 years ago
- Headquarters: Kita-ku, Osaka, Osaka, Japan
- Area served: Kansai, Chūgoku, Kyūshū, Shikoku and Okinawa
- Key people: Yoshinari Ishizuka (President)
- Owner: Government of Japan
- Number of employees: 2,374 (2016)
- Parent: Japan Expressway Holding and Debt Repayment Agency (Ministry of Land, Infrastructure, Transport and Tourism)
- Website: www.w-nexco.co.jp

The West Nippon Expressway Company Limited (西日本高速道路株式会社, Nishi-nihon Kōsoku-dōro Kabushiki-gaisha), abbreviated as NEXCO West (NEXCO西日本, NEXCO Nishi-Nihon), is one of the main operators of expressways and toll roads in Japan. It is headquartered on the 19th floor of Dojima Avanza in Kita-ku, Osaka. The company was established on October 1, 2005, as a result of the privatization of Japan Highway Public Corporation. The company manages roadways mainly in the Kansai and Chūgoku regions as well as on Kyūshū, Shikoku, and Okinawa Island. Roadways in other regions of Japan are managed by East Nippon Expressway Company and Central Nippon Expressway Company.
