= Expressways of Japan =

Expressways of Japan 高速道路 自動車道
- Expressway number signs for the Tōhoku Expressway, its parallel expressways, and the circular Ken-Ō Expressway

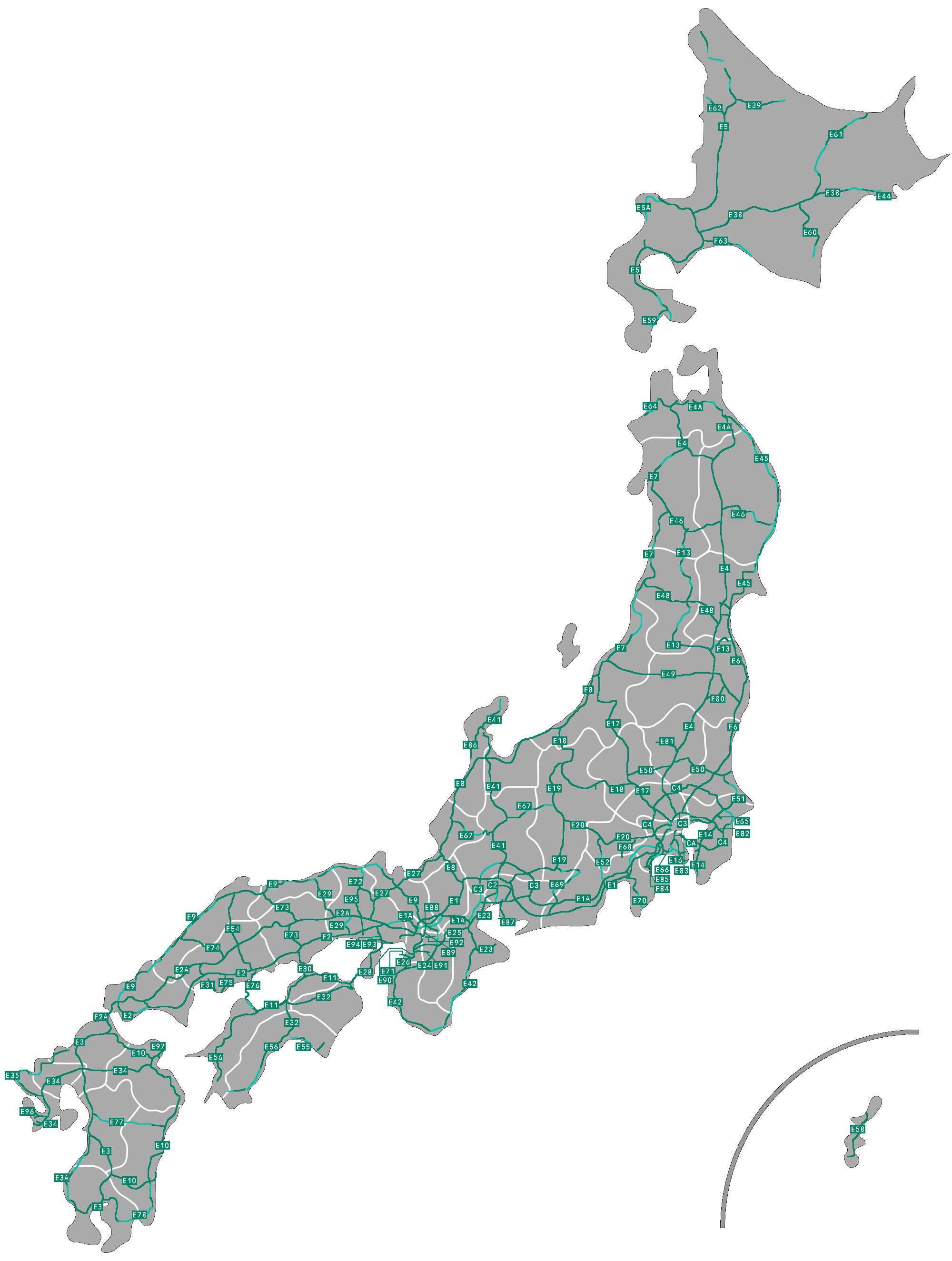

System information
- Maintained by the Japan Expressway Holding and Debt Repayment Agency, through its subsidiaries (East, Central, West Nippon Expressway Company Limited), the Metropolitan Expressway Company Limited, and others
- Formed: 1963

Highway names
- Expressways: Enn Expressway (E1) (primary route); EnnA Expressway (E1A) (parallel route); Cn Expressway (C1) (circular route)

System links
- National highways of Japan; Expressways of Japan

The expressways (高速道路, kōsoku-dōro; lit. "high-speed road", also jidōsha-dō (自動車道), lit. "automobile road", "freeway", "expressway", or "motorway") of Japan make up a large network of controlled-access toll expressways.

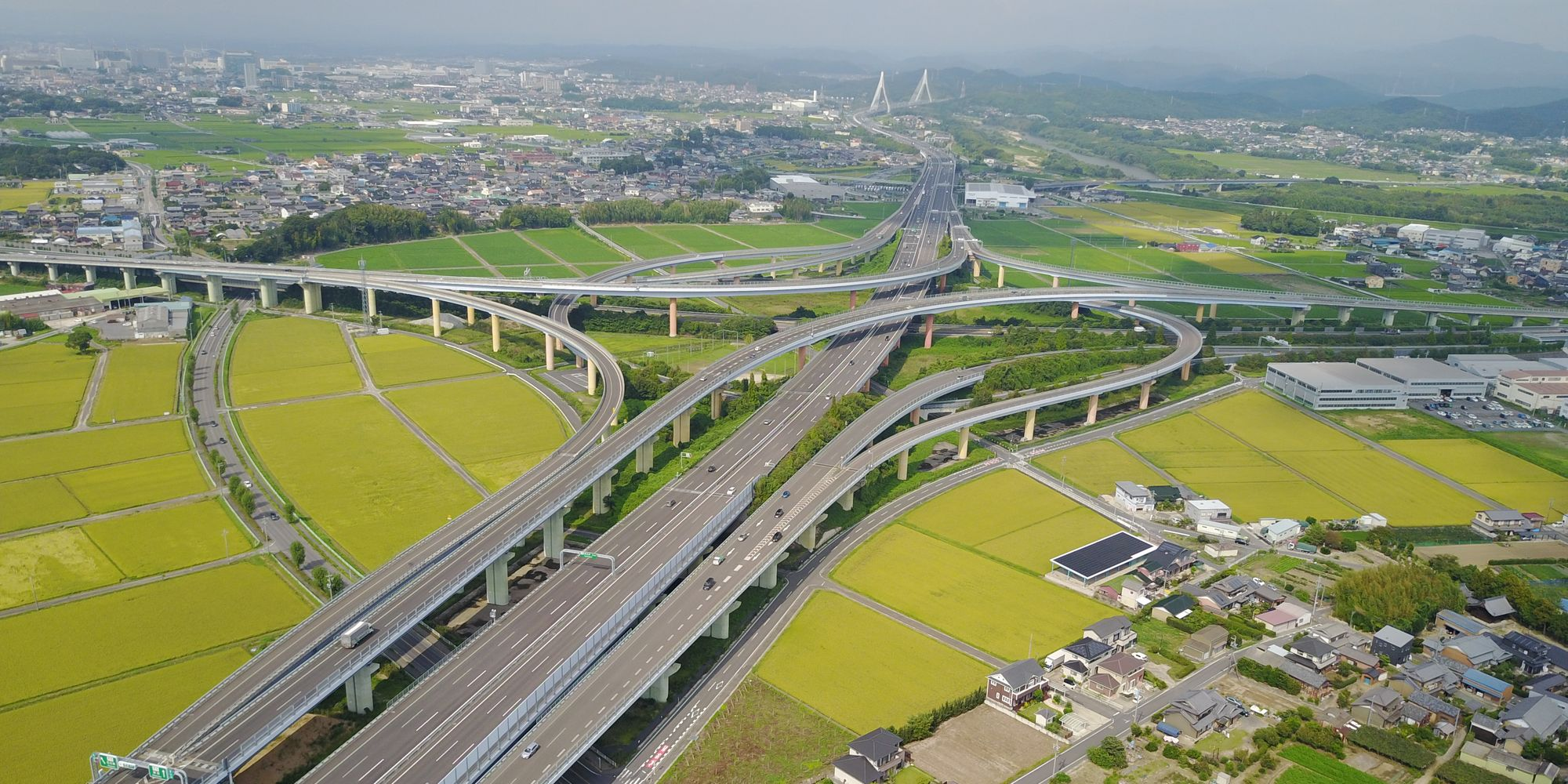
Junction of E1 and E1A, major expressways linking Tokyo and Nagoya in Central Japan

== History ==
Following World War II, Japan's economic revival led to a massive increase in personal automobile use. However the existing road system was inadequate to deal with the increased demand; in 1956 only 23% of national highways were paved, which included only two thirds of the main Tokyo-Osaka road (National Route 1).

In April 1956 the Japan Highway Public Corporation (JH) was established by the national government with the task of constructing and managing a nationwide network of expressways. In 1957 permission was given to the corporation to commence construction of the Meishin Expressway linking Nagoya and Kobe, the first section of which opened to traffic in 1963.

In addition to the national expressway network administered by JH, the government established additional corporations to construct and manage expressways in urban areas. The Metropolitan Expressway Public Corporation (responsible for the Shuto Expressway) was established in 1959, and the Hanshin Expressway Public Corporation (responsible for the Hanshin Expressway) was established in 1962. By 2004 the lengths of their networks had extended to 283 kilometres (175.8 mi) and 234 kilometres (145.4 mi) respectively.

In 1966 a plan was formally enacted for a 7,600 kilometres (4,722.4 mi) national expressway network. Under this plan construction of expressways running parallel to the coastlines of Japan would be given priority over those traversing the mountainous interior. In 1987, the plan was revised to extend the network to 14,000 kilometres (8,699.2 mi). In April 2018, completed sections of the network totaled 9,429 kilometres (5,858.9 mi)

In October 2005 JH, the Metropolitan Expressway Public Corporation, the Hanshin Expressway Public Corporation, and the Honshū-Shikoku Bridge Authority (managing three fixed-link connections between Honshu and Shikoku) were privatized under the reform policies of the government of Prime Minister Junichiro Koizumi. These privatizations are technically converting the corporations into stock companies with no stock sold to the general public, since the Government of Japan hold controlling shares in the successor companies. The expressway network of JH was divided into three companies based on geography - East Nippon Expressway Company (E-NEXCO), Central Nippon Expressway Company (C-NEXCO), and West Nippon Expressway Company (W-NEXCO). The Metropolitan Expressway Public Corporation transferred its authority to the Metropolitan Expressway Company, while the Hanshin Expressway Public Corporation transferred its authority to the Hanshin Expressway Company. The Honshu-Shikoku Bridge Authority became the Honshu-Shikoku Bridge Expressway Company, whose operations are planned to eventually be absorbed into those of W-NEXCO.

The act authorizing the privatization, the Act on Expressway Companies (高速道路株式会社法, Kōsoku-dōro kabushiki gaisha-hō; Act No. 99 of 2004), was modeled on similar acts authorizing the privatization of the Japanese National Railways into the Japan Railways Group (JR Group). However, unlike the JR Group acts:

- The government (or, in the case of Metropolitan Expressway Company, Hanshin Expressway Company, and Honshu-Shikoku Bridge Expressway Company, the government and local governments collectively) must own at least one-third of all shares; and
- The business goals of the companies are strictly defined.

== Finances ==
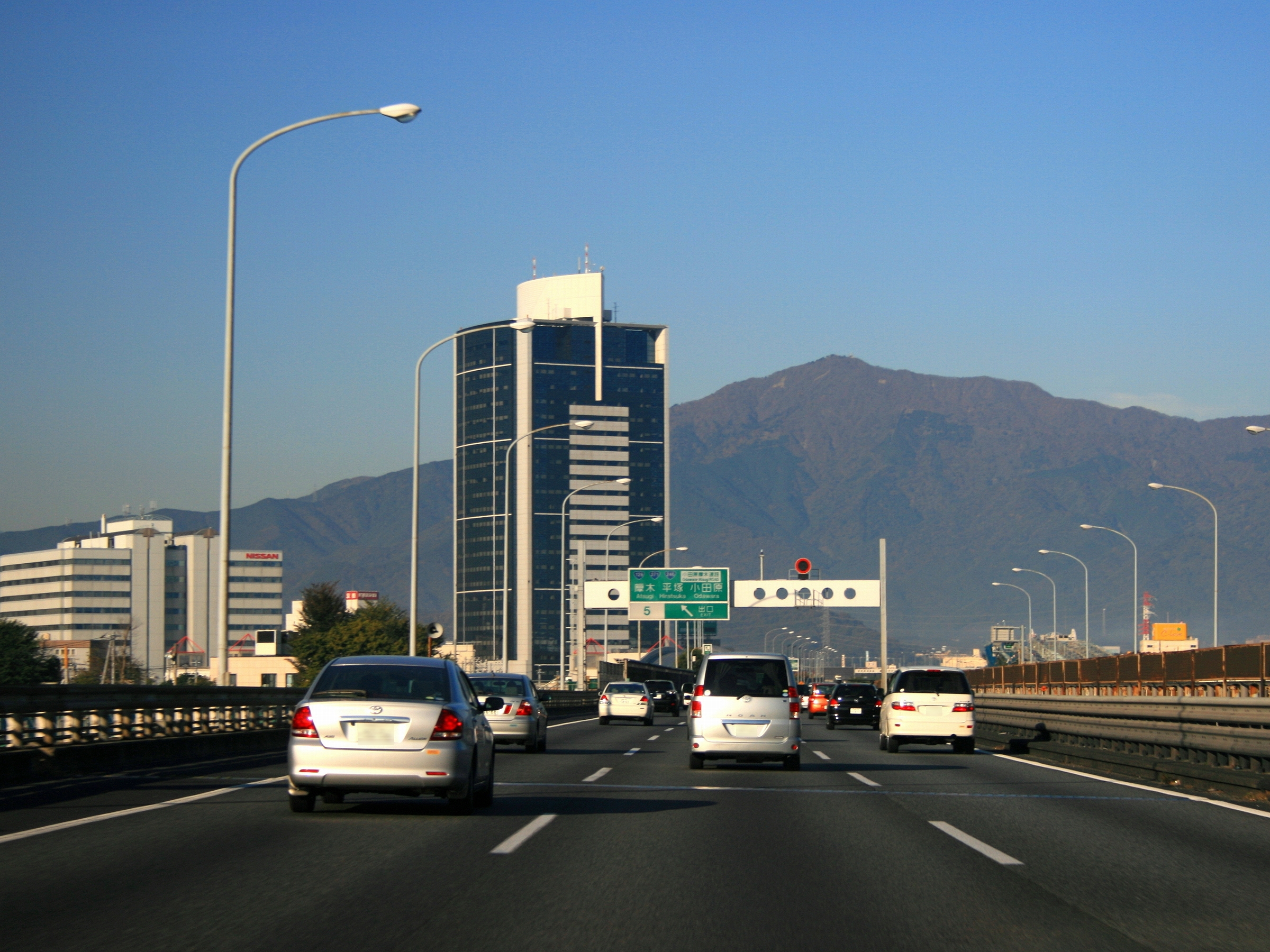
E1 Tōmei Expressway near Atsugi

Japan's expressway development has been financed largely with debt. It was intended to make the expressways free when they are paid off. The Meishin Expressway and Tomei Expressway debt has been fully paid off since 1990. It was decided in 1972 that tolls would be pooled from all expressways to provide a single source of operating funds, since some sections were little used. Earthquake resistant construction methods have added to costs, as well as extensive soundwalling. In March 2009 (then) Prime Minister Taro Aso unveiled a plan to reduce tolls to ¥1,000 on weekends and national holidays. Tolls on weekdays would be cut by around 30 percent. According to the National Expressway Construction Association, 4.41 million vehicles use the expressways daily, driving an average of 43.7 kilometres (27.2 mi).

== National expressways ==
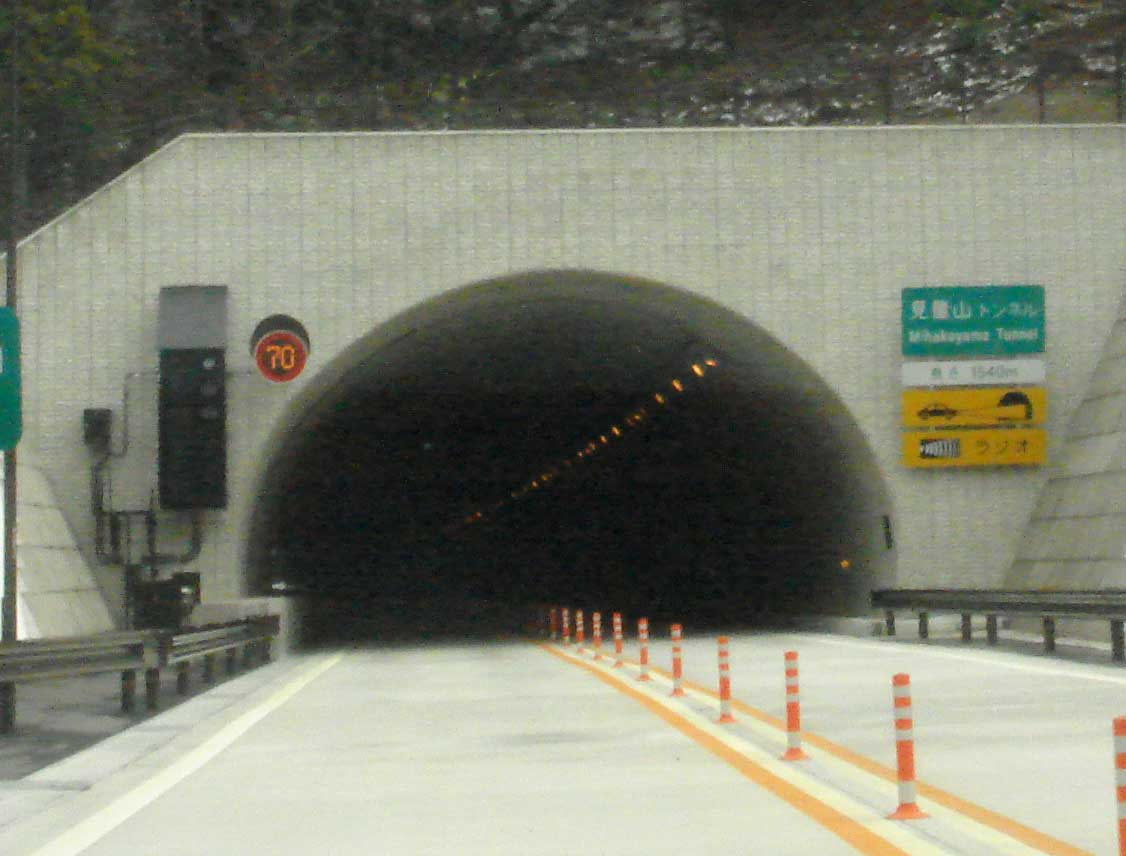
A typical tunnel entrance for rural two-lane expressways with electronic speed limit and notice signs

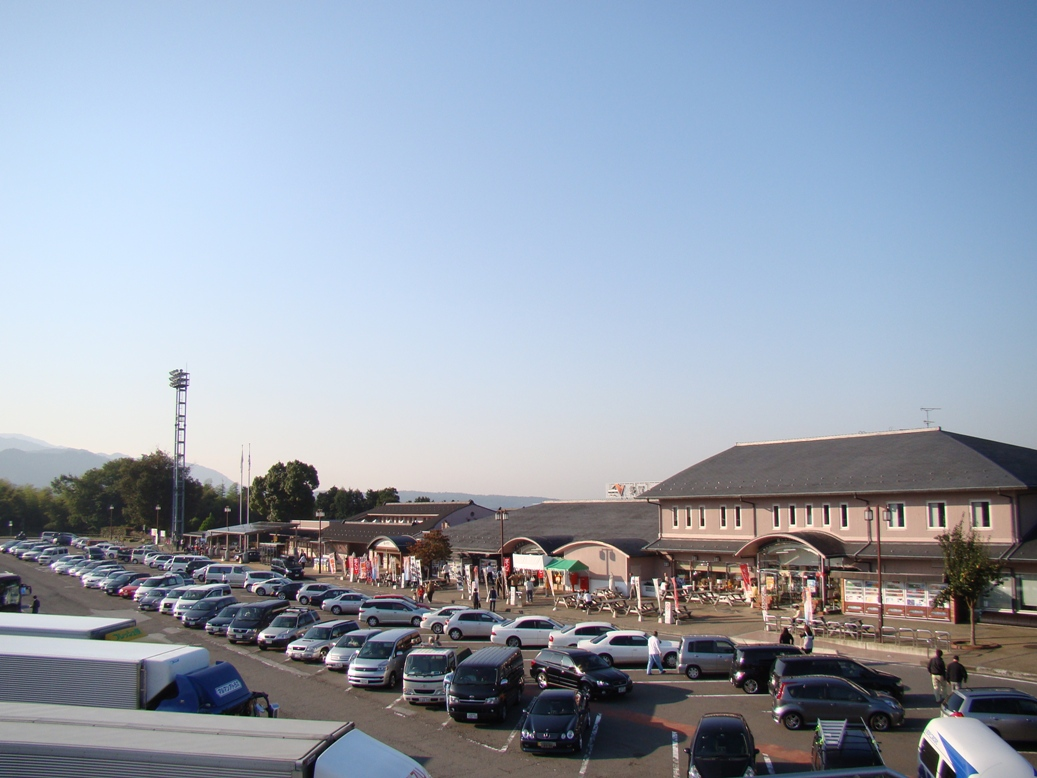
Taga Service Area

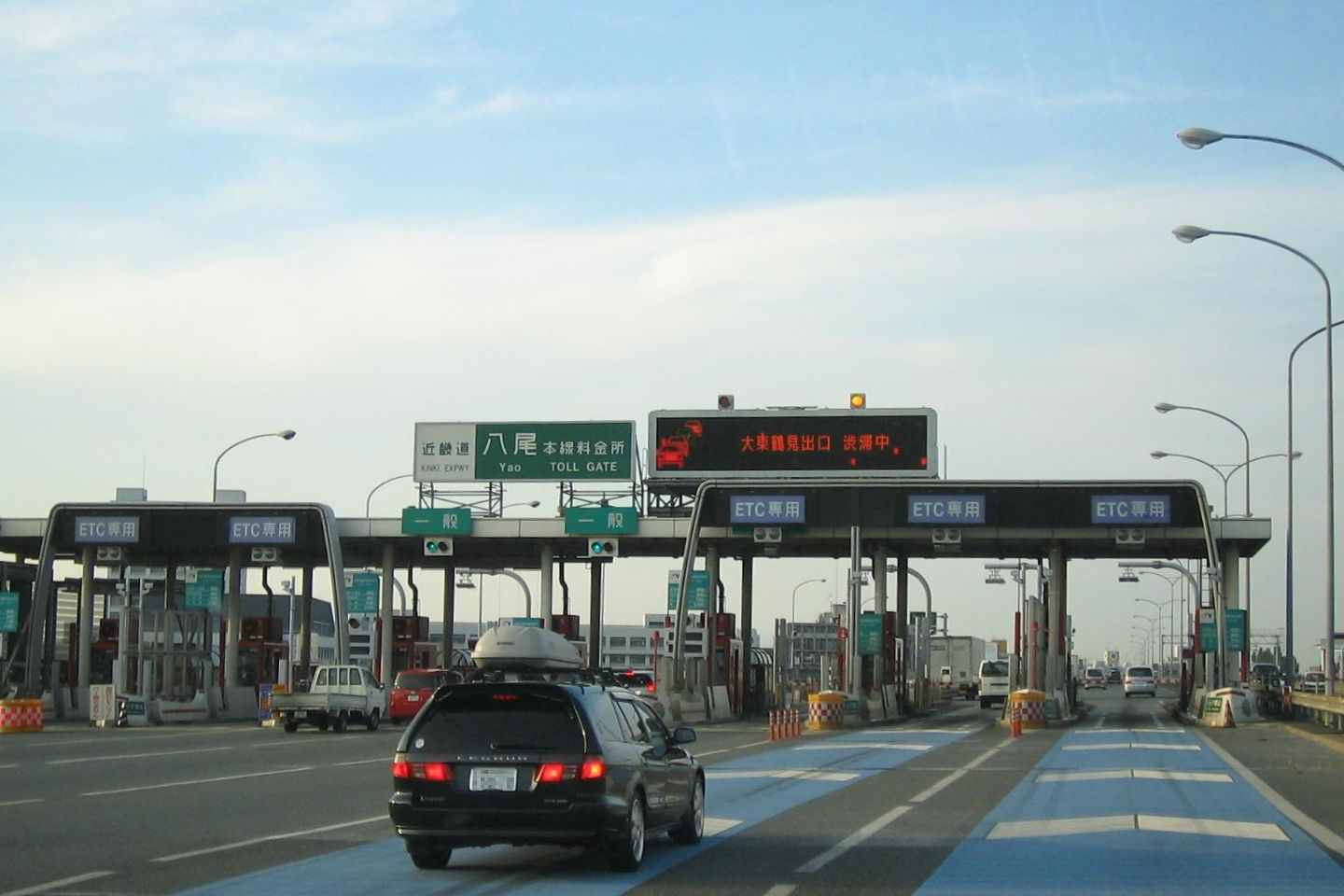
Toll gate on the E26 Kinki Expressway. The lanes under the arches are designated for ETC-capable vehicles only.

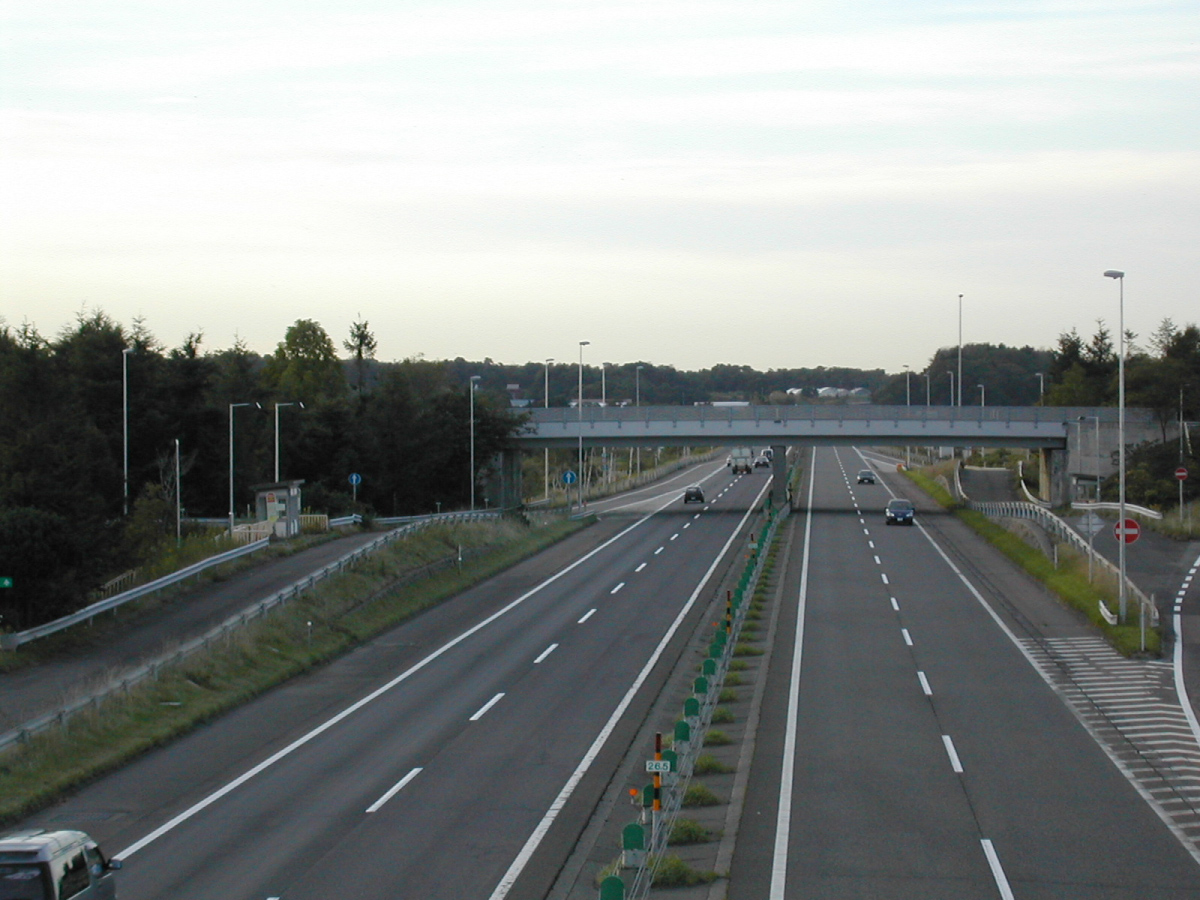
E5 Hokkaido Expressway

National expressways (高速自動車国道, Kōsoku Jidōsha Kokudō) make up the majority of expressways in Japan. This network boasts an uninterrupted link between Aomori Prefecture at the northern part of Honshu and Kagoshima Prefecture at the southern part of Kyushu, linking Shikoku as well. Additional expressways serve travellers in Hokkaido and on Okinawa Island, although those are not connected to the Honshu-Kyushu-Shikoku grid.

=== Features ===
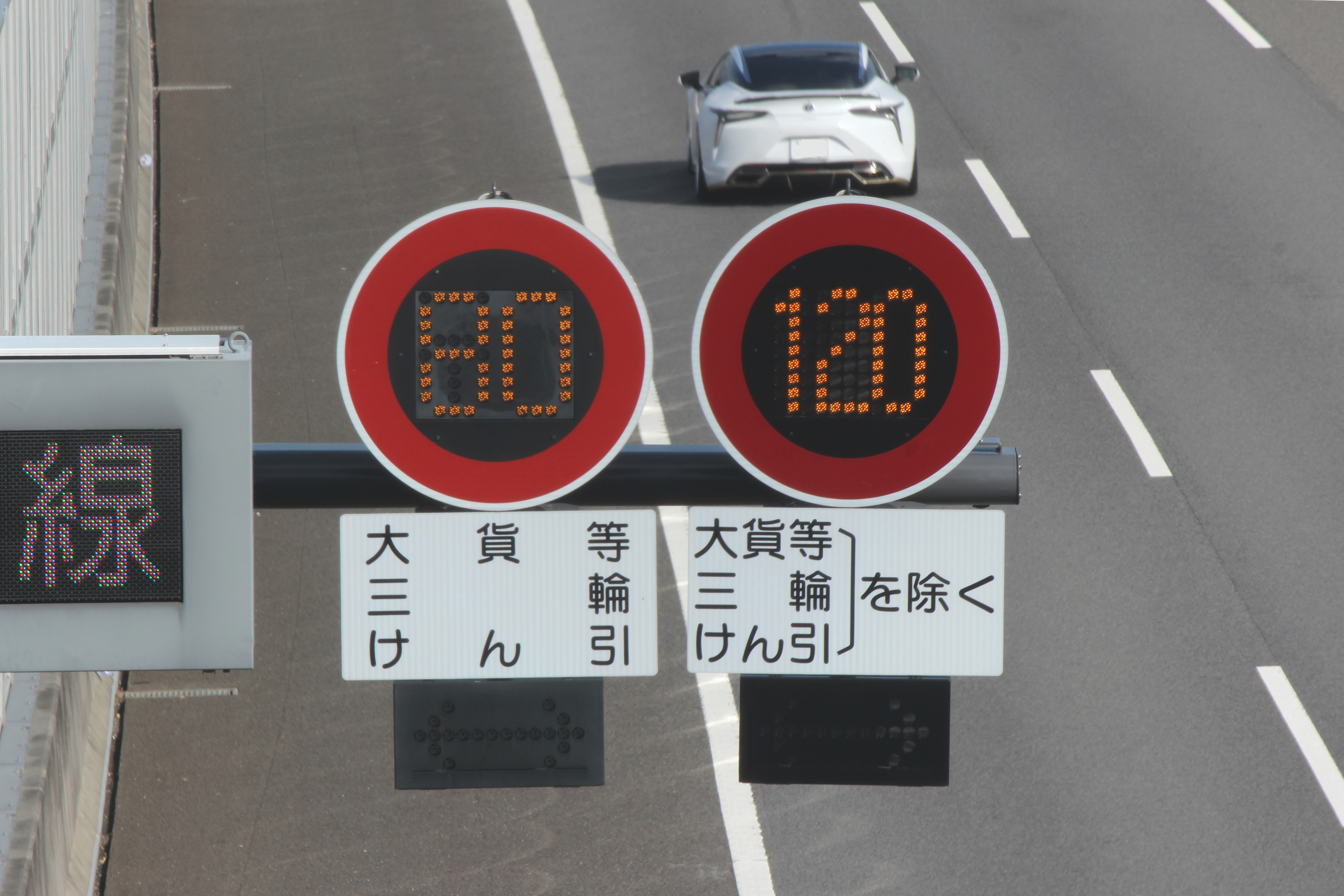
Variable speed limit signs used on expressways. Sign on the left denotes the limit for heavy trucks, motor vehicles with a trailer and three-wheelers; however, the speed limit for a heavy truck is since April 2024 raised from 80 to 90 km/h.

Most Japanese expressways are dual carriageways with 2-3 lanes per side, while in rural areas are constructed as undivided two-lane expressway. Two-lane expressway sections are built to a standard that allows for the addition of another parallel carriageway in the future.

The default speed limit is 70 km/h (approximately 45 mph) on a two-lane expressways, rising to 80 km/h (approximately 50 mph) on two-lane roads divided by a cable barrier. The speed limit on a divided expressway is 120 km/h (approximately 75 mph) unless a lower speed limit is posted.

Buses with a GVWR over 3.5 t and trucks with a GVWR between 3.5 t and 8 t are limited to 100 km/h (approx. 62 mph) even where a higher limit applies to other vehicle types. Similarly, a maximum speed limit of 80 km/h always applies to a motor vehicle with a trailer and three-wheeled vehicles. This limit also applied to trucks with a GVWR over 8 t and maximum load over 5 t, until April 2024, when the speed limit for heavy trucks was raised from 80 to 90 km/h (approximately 55 mph). Vehicles that are unable to reach a speed over 50 km/h (approx. 30 mph), such as tractors or mopeds, are not permitted on an expressway.

Variable speed limits are also in effect on most expressways and speeds are temporarily reduced when adverse driving conditions are present.

Many rest facilities such as parking areas (usually only with toilets or small shops) and service areas (usually with many more amenities such as restaurants and gas stations) serve travellers along national expressways.

=== Route numbering ===
On October 24, 2016, the Japanese Ministry of Land, Infrastructure, Transport and Tourism had introduced a new format of route numbering system for national expressways. Expressway route numbers begin with the prefix E or C (for circular route) followed by their respective numbers. Expressway routes are numbered according to the parallel national highway routes; for example, the E1 Tomei Expressway runs parallel with the National Route 1. However, there are exceptions in this rule, and some expressways that are assigned with the two-digit numbers greater than 59 which are not used for the national highway route numbers. The E64 Tsugaru Expressway is an example of this exception as it parallels National Route 101.

If more than one expressway runs parallel with a national highway route, the newer expressway within the corridor or one that deviates further from the national highway route may carry the suffix A at the end of its route number. For example, the Chūgoku Expressway and San'yō Expressway both run in parallel along the National Route 2 corridor. The San'yō Expressway is assigned the route code of E2 for running closer to the path of National Route 2 through the coastal cities, and the Chūgoku Expressway which runs further inland is assigned the route number of E2A.

=== Tolls ===
National expressways are often tolled, with the 325.5 kilometres (202.3 mi) journey from Tokyo to Nagoya on the Tōmei Expressway costing ¥7,100 in tolls for an ordinary car. According to the Japan Times, expressway tolls in Japan are three times as high as in France.

With a few exceptions, tolls on national expressways are based on distance travelled. When entering the expressway, one collects a ticket, which can be inserted along with the fare into a machine or handed to an attendant upon exiting the expressway. There is also an Electronic Toll Collection (ETC) card system installed in many cars which automatically pays at the toll gate. As of 2001 toll fees consist of a 150 yen terminal charge plus a fee which depends on the distance travelled. The rate of this fee depends on the type of vehicle as shown in the following table.

Type of vehicle	Rate in yen/km	Rate in yen/mile
Light car and motorcycle	19.68	31.49
Ordinary passenger car	24.60	39.36
Small and medium-sized truck	29.52	47.23
Large-sized truck	40.59	64.94
Special large-sized full trailer	67.65	108.24

Tolls are always rounded to the nearest 10 yen and include consumption tax. If there are two or more possible routes from the entrance to the exit, the toll will be calculated based on the shortest (cheapest) route.

Tolls collected from all routes are pooled into a single fund and are used to repay the entire network. It is expected that all national expressways in Japan will be fully repaid 45 years after privatization (2050).

Some future national expressways are planned to be built according to the New Direct Control System, whereby national and local governments will absorb the burden for expressway construction and operate toll-free upon completion.

== Urban expressways ==
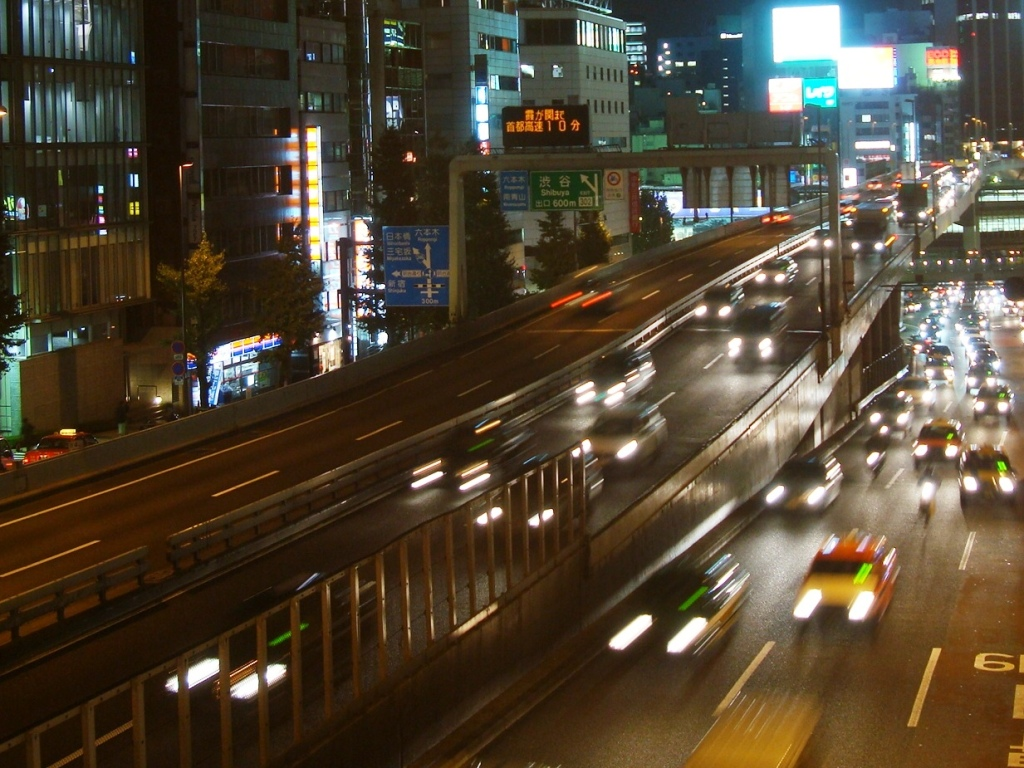
Shuto Expressway in Tokyo

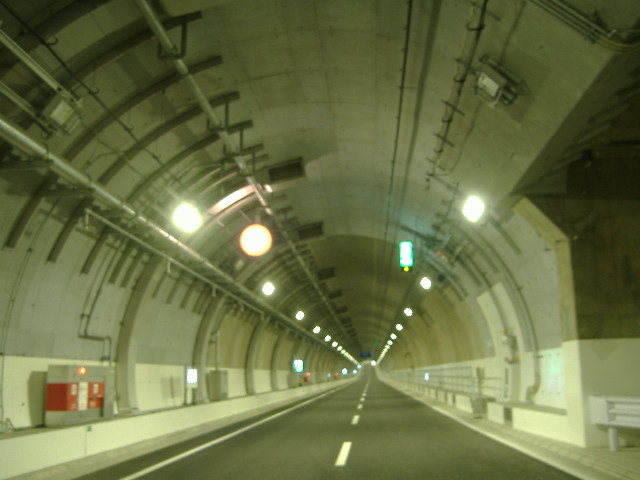
Yamate Tunnel in Tokyo is the world's third longest road tunnel.

Urban expressways (都市高速道路, Toshi Kōsokudōro) are intra-city expressways that are found in many of Japan's largest urban areas. Due to the nature of urban expressways going through dense urban areas combined with weak eminent domain powers in Japan, urban expressways have much lower design speed compared to national expressways and are constructed as viaducts or as underground tunnels along existing arterial roads.

The two largest urban expressway networks are the Shuto Expressway in the Tokyo area and the Hanshin Expressway in the Osaka area. There are other smaller networks in Nagoya, Hiroshima, Kitakyūshū, and Fukuoka. Each network is managed separately from each other (the Fukuoka and Kitakyūshū Expressways are managed by the same company but are not physically connected to each other).

== Safety ==
In 2019, there were 163 fatalities, 527 serious injuries and 11,702 minor injuries on all expressways, all of which were lower than in 2018.

View source data.
View source data.

== Others ==
This sign indicates entrances to expressway-standard roads.

All roads in Japan that are built to expressway standards (including national and urban expressways themselves) are known as Roads for motor vehicles only (自動車専用道路, Jidōsha Senyō Dōro). If a road for motor vehicles only cannot be classified as a national or urban expressway, it may be classified into one of the following categories.

- National highway for motor vehicles only with national expressway concurrency (高速自動車国道に並行する一般国道自動車専用道路, Kōsoku Jidōsha Kokudō ni Heikōsuru Ippan Kokudō Jidōsha Senyō Dōro)
  - Roads in this category are built to facilitate future incorporation into the main route of a national expressway. Examples include the Michinoku Toll Road, the Higashi-Mito Road and the Futtsu Tateyama Road.
- National highway for motor vehicles only (一般国道の自動車専用道路, Ippan Kokudō no Jidōsha Senyō Dōro)
  - Roads in this category are national highways built to expressway standards as designated by the Minister of Land, Infrastructure and Transport. Examples include the Ken-Ō Expressway and the Tōkai-Kanjō Expressway.
