= Mei-Nikan Expressway =

Expressway in Aichi Prefecture, Japan

Mei-Nikan Expressway
- 名古屋第二環状自動車道 (Nagoya Daini-Kanjō Jidōsha-dō)

Route information
- Maintained by Central Nippon Expressway Company
- Length: 43.7 km (27.2 mi)
- Existed: 1988–present
- Component highways: National Route 302

Major junctions
- From: Nagoya-minami Junction in Nagoya; Isewangan Expressway; Nagoya Expressway Ōdaka Route
- To: Nagoya-nishi Junction in Nagoya; Higashi-Meihan Expressway; Nagoya Expressway Mamba Route

Location
- Country: Japan
- Major cities: Kasugai, Kiyosu, Ama, Oharu

Highway system
- National highways of Japan; Expressways of Japan

The Mei-Nikan Expressway (名二環, Mei-Nikan), or Nagoya Daini Kanjō Expressway (名古屋第二環状自動車道, Nagoya Daini-Kanjō Jidōsha-dō), is a partially completed tolled expressway in Japan. It is owned and operated by the Central Nippon Expressway Company. Upon completion, the expressway will form a second ring road around Nagoya in conjunction with the Isewangan Expressway. It is signed as C2 under the "2016 Proposal for Realization of Expressway Numbering."

== Route description ==
The Mei-Nikan is a ring-shaped high-speed national expressway built around 10 kilometres (6.2 mi) from the city center of Nagoya. It is a 43.7 kilometres (27.2 mi) long second ring road for the city, the outer ring road is the incompleted 152.4 kilometres (94.7 mi) long Tōkai-Kanjō Expressway, and the inner ring route is the 10.3 kilometres (6.4 mi) long Nagoya Expressway Ring Route. Upon completion, the Mei-Nikan Expressway will have a total length of 55.9 kilometres (34.7 mi). The Mei-Nikan runs concurrent to Japan National Route 302, the only exception to this concurrency is the branch route that connects the ring road to the Tōmei Expressway.

The section between Hikiyama Interchange and Ōmori Interchange consists of tunnels that run underneath waterways; vehicles carrying dangerous goods are forbidden from travelling through these tunnels and must use alternate routes.

== History ==
The first section of what would become the Mei-Nikan Expressway was opened on 23 March 1988 between Kiyosu-higashi Interchange and Nagoya-nishi Interchange as part of the Higashi-Meihan Expressway. The expressway was opened in phases since then as part of the Higashi-Meihan until 2011, when it was redesignated as the Mei-Nikan Expressway.

== Future ==
Construction is underway to extend the expressway 12.2 kilometres (7.6 mi) south to the Isewangan Expressway southwest of Nagoya by 2020. Upon completion, this would complete the loop made around the city by the two expressways.

== List of interchanges and features ==
- IC - interchange, SIC - smart interchange, JCT - junction, PA - parking area, SA - service area, TB - toll gate, TN - tunnel
- The expressway is located entirely in Aichi Prefecture

No.	Name	Connections	Dist. from Nagoya-minami JCT	Notes	Location	
(5)	Nagoya-minami JCT	Isewangan Expressway; Nagoya Expressway Ōdaka Route	0.0		Midori-ku	Nagoya
1	Arimatsu IC	National Route 1	2.4	Nagoya-nishi-bound exit, Nagoya-minami-bound entrance	Midori-ku	Nagoya
1	Arimatsu IC	National Route 1	3.5	Nagoya-minami-bound exit, Nagoya-nishi-bound entrance	Midori-ku	Nagoya
2	Narumi IC	Tōkaidō; Pref. Route 56 (Nagoya Okazaki Route)	6.5	Nagoya-nishi-bound exit, Nagoya-minami-bound entrance	Midori-ku	Nagoya
2	Narumi IC	Tōkaidō; Pref. Route 56 (Nagoya Okazaki Route)	7.6	Nagoya-minami-bound exit, Nagoya-nishi-bound entrance	Midori-ku	Nagoya
3	Ueta IC	National Route 153 (Toyota-nishi Bypass)	11.0	Nagoya-nishi-bound exit, Nagoya-minami-bound entrance	Tempaku-ku	Nagoya
3	Ueta IC	National Route 153 (Toyota-nishi Bypass)	12.0	Nagoya-minami-bound exit, Nagoya-nishi-bound entrance	Tempaku-ku	Nagoya
4	Takabari JCT	Nagoya Expressway Higashiyama Route	12.7		Meito-ku	Nagoya
5	Kamiyashiro-minami IC		14.9	Nagoya-nishi-bound exit, Nagoya-minami-bound entrance only	Meito-ku	Nagoya
5-1	Kamiyashiro JCT	Mei-Nikan Expressway (Nagoya Connecting Road)	15.4		Meito-ku	Nagoya
6	Kamiyashiro IC		15.9	in Meitō Tunnel; Nagoya-minami-bound exit, Nagoya-nishi-bound entrance only	Meito-ku	Nagoya
7	Hikiyama IC		17.1	in Meitō Tunnel; Nagoya-nishi-bound exit, Nagoya-minami-bound entrance only	Meito-ku	Nagoya
TN	Meitō Tunnel			Dangerous goods forbidden	Moriyama-ku	Nagoya
TN	Moriyama Tunnel			Dangerous goods forbidden	Moriyama-ku	Nagoya
8	Ōmori IC		19.3	in Moriyama Tunnel; Nagoya-minami-bound exit, Nagoya-nishi-bound entrance only	Moriyama-ku	Nagoya
9	Obata IC	Pref. Route 15 (Nagoya Tajimi Route)	20.2	in Moriyama Tunnel; Nagoya-nishi-bound exit, Nagoya-minami-bound entrance only	Moriyama-ku	Nagoya
10	Matsukawado IC	Pref. Route 30 (Sekida Nagoya Route)	22.5	Nagoya-minami-bound exit, Nagoya-nishi-bound entrance only	Kasugai	
11	Kachigawa IC	Pref. Route 508 (Utsutsu Kachigawa Route)	23.5	Nagoya-nishi-bound exit, Nagoya-minami-bound entrance	Kasugai	
11	Kachigawa IC	Pref. Route 508 (Utsutsu Kachigawa Route)	25.2	Nagoya-minami-bound exit, Nagoya-nishi-bound entrance	Kasugai	
12	Kusunoki IC		26.9	Nagoya-nishi-bound exit, Nagoya-minami-bound entrance only	Kita-ku	Nagoya
13	Kusunoki JCT	Nagoya Expressway Kusunoki Route; Nagoya Expressway Komaki Route	27.8		Kita-ku	Nagoya
14	Yamada-higashi IC		28.9	Exits only	Nishi-ku	Nagoya
15	Yamada-nishi IC		30.2	Entrances only	Nishi-ku	Nagoya
16	Hirata IC		31.8	Nagoya-minami-bound exit, Nagoya-nishi-bound entrance only	Nishi-ku	Nagoya
17	Kiyosu-higashi IC	National Route 22 (Meigi Bypass)	32.4	Nagoya-nishi-bound exit, Nagoya-minami-bound entrance only	Nishi-ku	Nagoya
17	Kiyosu-higashi IC	National Route 22 (Meigi Bypass)	32.4	Nagoya-nishi-bound exit, Nagoya-minami-bound entrance only	Kiyosu	
17-1	Kiyosu JCT	Nagoya Expressway Kiyosu Route; Nagoya Expressway Ichinomiya Route	33.0		Kiyosu	
17	Kiyosu-higashi IC	National Route 22 (Meigi Bypass)	33.8	Nagoya-minami-bound exit, Nagoya-nishi-bound entrance only	Kiyosu	
18	Kiyosu-nishi IC		36.0	Nagoya-nishi-bound exit, Nagoya-minami-bound entrance only	Kiyosu	
19	Jimokuji-kita IC		37.6	Nagoya-minami-bound exit, Nagoya-nishi-bound entrance only	Ama	
20	Jimokuji-minami IC		38.9	Nagoya-nishi-bound exit, Nagoya-minami-bound entrance only	Ama	
21	Ōharu-kita IC		39.9	Nagoya-minami-bound exit, Nagoya-nishi-bound entrance only	Ōharu	
22	Ōharu-minami IC	National Route 1	41.5	Nagoya-nishi-bound exit, Nagoya-minami-bound entrance only	Ōharu	
TB	Ōharu Toll Plaza			Nagoya-minami-bound only	Ōharu	
23	Nagoya-nishi JCT	Higashi-Meihan Expressway; Nagoya Expressway Manba Route	42.3		Nakagawa-ku	Nagoya
24	Sennonji-minami IC	Pref. Route 115 (Tsushima Shippō Nagoya Route); Pref. Route 40 (Nagoya Kanie Yatomi Route)			Nakagawa-ku	Nagoya
25	Tomida IC	National Route 1			Nakagawa-ku	Nagoya
26	Nan-yo IC				Minato-ku, Nagoya	Nagoya
27	Tobishima-kita IC	National Route 23 (Meishi Highway)			Tobishima	
(10-1)	Tobishima IC/JCT	Isewangan Expressway; Pref. Rout 71 (Nagoya-nishiko Route)			Tobishima	

=== Nagoya Connecting Road ===
- Located in Meito-ku, Nagoya

No.	Name	Connections	Dist. from Nagoya IC	Notes
(21)	Nagoya IC	Tōmei Expressway	0.0	Entrance/exit for local roads only accessible from Tōmei Expressway
5-2	Hongō IC	Pref. Route 60 (Nagoya Nagakute Route)	0.5	Nagoya IC-bound exit, Kamiyashiro-bound entrance only
5-1	Kamiyashiro JCT	Mei-Nikan Expressway (Mei-Nikan Expressway Main Route)	1.4	
