= Japan National Route 19 =

National highway in Japan

National Route 19
- 国道19号

Route information
- Length: 272.7 km (169.4 mi)
- Existed: 4 December 1952–present

Major junctions
- South end: National Route 1 / National Route 247 in Atsuta-ku, Nagoya
- North end: National Route 18 in Nagano

Location
- Country: Japan

Highway system
- National highways of Japan; Expressways of Japan
← National Route 18	→ National Route 20

National Route 19 (国道19号, Kokudō jūkyū-gō) is a national highway connecting Nagoya and Nagano in Japan.

== Route data ==
- Length: 272.7 km (169.4 mi)
- Origin: Atsuta-ku, Nagoya, Nagoya (originates at junction with Route 1)
- Terminus: Nagano City (ends at junction with Route 18)
- Major cities: Kasugai, Tajimi, Toki, Mizunami, Ena, Nakatsugawa, Shiojiri, Matsumoto, Azumino

== History ==
- 4 December 1952 - Designation as First Class National Highway 19 (from Nagoya to Nagano, Nagano)
- 1 April 1965 - Designation as General National Highway 19 (from Nagoya to Nagano, Nagano)

== Overlapping sections ==
- From Atsuta-ku, Nagoya (Atsuta Shrine South intersection) to Naka-ku, Nagoya (Bank of Japan (Nichigin) intersection): Route 22
- From Toki (Odomi intersection) to Mizunami (Yamanouchi intersection): Route 21
- From Ena (Shoke intersection) to Sendambayashi, Nakatsugawa: Route 257
- From Nakatsugawa (Iyasaka-bashi intersection) to Nagiso Town (Azuma-bashi intersection): Route 256
- In Kiso Town, from Kiso-ohashi intersection to Hiyoshi-Ozawabara intersection: Route 361

== Municipalities passed through ==
- Aichi Prefecture
  - Nagoya - Kasugai
- Gifu Prefecture
  - Tajimi - Toki - Mizunami - Ena - Nakatsugawa
- Nagano Prefecture
  - Nagiso - Okuwa - Agematsu - Kiso town - Kiso Village - Shiojiri - Matsumoto - Azumino - Ikusaka - Ōmachi - Nagano

== Intersects with ==
Prefecture	Location	Destinations	Notes
Aichi Prefecture	Nagoya	National Route 1, National Route 247	At the origin, in Atsuta-ku
Aichi Prefecture	Nagoya	National Route 22	From the origin to Naka-ku; overlapping section
Aichi Prefecture	Higashi-ku, Nagoya	National Route 41, National Route 153	
Aichi Prefecture	Kasugai	National Route 155	
Gifu Prefecture	Tajimi	National Route 248	
Gifu Prefecture	Toki – Mizunami	National Route 21	Overlapping section
Gifu Prefecture	Ena	National Route 418	
Gifu Prefecture	Ena – Nakatsugawa	National Route 257	Overlapping section
Gifu Prefecture	Nakatsugawa	National Route 363	
Gifu Prefecture	Nakatsugawa – Nagiso	National Route 256	Overlapping section
Nagano Prefecture	Kiso	National Route 361	Overlapping section
Nagano Prefecture	Shiojiri	National Route 20, National Route 153	
Nagano Prefecture	Matsumoto	National Route 143, National Route 147, National Route 158, National Route 254	
Nagano Prefecture	Azumino	National Route 403	
Nagano Prefecture	Nagano	National Route 117	
Nagano Prefecture	Nagano	National Route 18	At the terminus

== Detail ==
"int." means intersection.

Aichi Prefecture

Road facilities	Explanation		Remarks	Name
Nagoya City
Atsuta Shrine South int.	The origin		Atsuta Ward	Fushimi Street
Atsuta Shrine South int.	Intersects with National Route 1, 247		Overlaps with National Route 22	Fushimi Street
Atsuta Shrine South int.	Intersects with National Route 1, 247		Heading north	Fushimi Street
	West Gate of Atsuta Shrine			Fushimi Street
Hataya-cho int.	Intersects with Aichi Prefectural Road Route 224			Fushimi Street
Hataya-cho int.	Atsuta Jingu Nishi Station (Subway Meijo Line) underground			Fushimi Street
Nishi Takakura int.	Nishi Takakura Station (Subway Meijo Line) underground			Fushimi Street
Shin'oto 2-chome int.				Fushimi Street
Shin'oto int.	Intersects with Aichi Prefectural Road Route 29			Fushimi Street
Kanayama-Shimbashi; Bridge South int.	Intersects with Aichi Prefecrural Road Route 115			Fushimi Street
Kanayama-Shimbashi; Bridge South int.	Kanayama Station is to the east			Fushimi Street
Kanayama-Shimbashi Bridge	Cross over the JR Tokaido Line, the Meitetsu Nagoya Line, and the JR Chuo Line		into Naka Ward	Fushimi Street
Kyuchobori int.				Fushimi Street
Furuwatari-cho int.	Intersects with Sanno Street			Fushimi Street
Furuwatari-cho int.	Pass under the Nagoya Expressway Route C1			Fushimi Street
Matsubara int.				Fushimi Street
Nishi Osu int.	Intersects with Osu Street			Fushimi Street
	Osu Kannon Station (Subway Tsurumai Line) underground			Fushimi Street
Wakamiya South int.	Intersects with Wakamiya-odori Street (westbound)			Fushimi Street
	Pass under the Nagoya Expressway Route 2			Fushimi Street
Wakamiya North int.	Intersects with Wakamiya-odori Street (eastbound)			Fushimi Street
Mitsukura int.	Intersects with Mitsukura Street			Fushimi Street
Hirokoji-Fushimi int.	Intersects with Hirokoji Street (Aichi Prefectural; Road Route 60)	Fushimi Station (Subway; Tsurumai Line, Subway; Higashiyama Line) underground		Fushimi Street
Nishikidori-Fushimi int.	Intersects with Nishikidori Street	Fushimi Station (Subway; Tsurumai Line, Subway; Higashiyama Line) underground		Fushimi Street
Fushimi-Fukuromachi int.	Intersects with Fukuromachi Street			Fushimi Street
Bank of Japan (Nichigin) int.	National Route 22 branches off		Heading east	
Bank of Japan (Nichigin) int.	Intersects with Aichi Prefectural Road Route 68		Heading east	
Bank of Japan (Nichigin) int.	Marunouchi Station (Subway Tsurumai Line, Subway Sakuradori Line) underground		Heading east	
Sakuradori-Nagashimacho int.	Intersects with Nagashimacho Street			Sakuradori; Street
Sakuradori-Chojamachi int.	Intersects with Chojamachi Street			Sakuradori; Street
Sakuradori-Honmachi int.	Intersects with Honmachi Street			Sakuradori; Street
Sakuradori-Gofuku int.	Intersects with Gofukucho Street			Sakuradori; Street
Sakuradori-Otsu int.	Intersects with Otsu Street			Sakuradori; Street
Sakuradori-Hisaya West int.	Intersects with Hisaya-odori Street (northbound)			Sakuradori; Street
	Hisaya-odori Station (Subway Sakuradori Line, Subway Meijo Line) underground			Sakuradori; Street
Sakuradori-Hisaya East int.	Intersects with Hisaya-odori Street (southbound)			Sakuradori; Street
Sakuradori-Izumi 1-chome int.			into Higashi Ward	Sakuradori; Street
Sakuradori-Izumi 1-chome East int.				Sakuradori; Street
Takaoka int.	The origin of National Route 41			Sakuradori; Street
Takaoka int.	Intersects with Airport Route			Sakuradori; Street
Takaoka int.	Pass under the Nagoya Expressway Route C1			Sakuradori; Street
	Takaoka Station (Subway Sakuradori Line) underground			Sakuradori; Street
Sakuradori-Izumi 2-chome int.				Sakuradori; Street
Ogawa int.	The origin of National Route 153		Heading northeast	
Izumi 3-chome int.				Aoi-cho Route
Daikan-cho int.				Aoi-cho Route
Heiden-cho int.	Intersects with Sotobori Street			Aoi-cho Route
Heiden-cho North int.				Aoi-cho Route
Akatsuka int.	Intersects with Aichi Prefectural Road Route 215 (Dekimachidori Street)			Aoi-cho Route
Tokugawa 2-chome int.				Aoi-cho Route
	Pass under the Meitetsu Seto Line		into Kita Ward	Aoi-cho Route
	Morishita Station (Meitetsu Seto Line) is to the east		into Kita Ward	Aoi-cho Route
Ozone South int.				Aoi-cho Route
Ozone int.				Aoi-cho Route
Ozone 4-chome int.	Intersects with Aichi Prefectural Road Route 15		Heading north	
Rokugo Elementary School; West int.				
Heian 2-chome int.	Intersects with Nagoya Loop Route			
Yamada 2-chome int.				
Yamada Post Office North int.				
Yamada 4-chome int.				
Tenjin Bridge South int.				
Tenjin Bridge	Crossing the Yada River		into Moriyama Ward	
Sekoguchi int.				
Machikuchi Bridge	Crossing the Furukawa River			
Machikuchi Bridge int.				
Sekonakashima int.				
Seko int.	Intersects with Aichi Prefectural Road Route 202			
Koshin int.	Intersects with Aichi Prefectural Road Route 59		Overlaps with Aichi Prefectural; Road Route 59	
Kachigawa Bridge South int.				
Kachigawa Bridge	Crossing the Shonai River			
Kasugai City
Kachigawa Bridge North int.	Intersects with Aichi Prefectural Road Route 162		Overlaps with Aichi Prefectural; Road Route 162	
Kachigawacho 1-chome int.				
Jizo Bridge	Crossing the Jizo River			
Kachigawachonishi 2-chome int.	Aichi Prefectural Road; Route 59 and 162 branch off			
Kachigawacho 3-chome int.				
Kachigawacho 4-chome int.	Intersects with National Route 302		Heading northeast	
Kachigawacho 4-chome int.	Pass under the Nagoya Second Ring; Expressway (Mei-Nikan Exp) and Johoku Line		Heading northeast	
Kachigawacho 4-chome int.	The Kachigawa Underpass runs beneath this intersection		Heading northeast	
Yamatodori 1-chome int.				
Yamatodori 2-chome int.	Intersects with Aichi Prefectural Road Route 62			
Yamatodori 2-chome East int.				
Wakakusadori 1-chome int.	Intersects with Aichi Prefectural Road Route 201			
Wakakusadori 3-chome int.				
Mizuhodori 1-chome int.				
Mizuhodori 3-chome int.				
City Office North int.				
Mizuhodori 5-chome int.	Intersects with Aichi Prefectural Road Route 25			
Mizuhodori 7-chome int.				
Umegatsubocho int.	Intersects with Tokadai-Kasugai Line			
Rokkenyacho int.				
Higashinocho int.				
Kasugai I.C West int.	Intersects with Aichi Prefectural Road Route 451			
	Pass under the Tomei Expressway			
Kasugai I.C	Interchange of the Tomei Expressway			
Kasugai I.C East int.	Intersects with National Route 155			

It enters Tajimi City, Gifu Prefecture, at the Utsutsu Pass which is about 250m above sea level.

Gifu Prefecture
It enters the urban area of Tajimi City around the point where it crosses the JR Taita Line at the Ikeda Overpass. It intersects with National Route 248 at the Otowa-cho intersection. This intersection is a chronic cause of traffic congestion. It passes under the elevated tracks of the JR Chuo Line, crosses the Toki River at the Kokei-Ōhashi Bridge, and then enters Toki City. It crosses the Shinmei Pass, passes under the Tokai-Kanjo Expressway, crosses the Toki River again at the Toki-Ōhashi Bridge, and enters the urban area of Toki City. It merges with National Route 21 at the Ōtomi intersection, and National Route 21 overlaps with it until its origin at the Yamanouchi intersection in Mizunami City. After the merge, It runs parallel to the JR Chuo Line until it enters the Mizunami Bypass. Immediately upon entering Mizunami City, there is the Yamanouchi intersection, where the old road (Gifu Prefectural Road Route 352 Ōnishi-Mizunami Line) branches off and the Mizunami Bypass begins. It crosses the JR Chuo Line via an elevated bridge, and then crosses the Toki River yet again via the Oda-Ōhashi Bridge. The bypass makes a large detour south through the urban area of Mizunami City. It crosses the Toki River and the JR Chuo Line at the Kōno-Ōhashi Bridge, and reaches the Tsurushiro intersection. This is the point where it merges with the old road and the end of the Mizunami Bypass. It narrows to one lane in each direction, and after passing through the Kamado-cho area of Mizunami City, it enters Ena City. This is the Takenami-cho area, and it intersects with National Route 418 at the Mukainagare intersection. It passes above the Shin-Makigane Tunnel on the downbound line of the JR Chuo Line, and a little later above the Makigane Tunnel on the upbound line of JR Chuo Line. It enters Ena Bypass just before reaching the urban area of Ena City. It intersects with Gifu Prefectural Road Route 66 at the Nagata Interchange, and when it reaches almost the halfway point of the bypass, it widens to two lanes in each direction. It merges with National Route 257 coming from the south at the Shōge intersection, and crosses the Agigawa River, a tributary of the Kiso River, at the Ena-Ōhashi Bridge. It passes under the elevated tracks of the Akechi Railway and merges with the old road (the end of the Ena Bypass). After that, it immediately passes under the Chuo Expressway and runs parallel to it until the Nakatsugawa Interchange. After passing the entrance and exit to Nakatsugawa Interchange, National Route 257 branches off to the north. It enters the Nakatsugawa Bypass here, and about 1.5 km further on, it crosses the Nakatsugawa River, a tributary of the Kiso River, via the Nakatsugawa-Ōhashi Bridge. It intersects with Registro Street (Gifu Prefectural Road Route 71 Nakatsugawa Sta. Line), which extends from Nakatsugawa Station on the JR Chuo Line, via an overpass. The Nakatsugawa Bypass ends at the Okita intersection, approximately 3km ahead, and narrows to one lane in each direction.

== Bypasses ==
- Kasugai Bypass (春日井バイパス) L=about 18km
  Section within Kasugai City
- Utsutsu Bypass (内津バイパス) L=3.5km
  Utsutsu-cho, Kasugai City, Aichi - Ikeda-cho, Tajimi City, Gifu
- Tajimi Bypass (多治見バイパス) L=4.5km
  Ikeda-cho, Tajimi City - Ikuta-cho, Tajimi City
- Toki Bypass (土岐バイパス) L=7.9km
  Tokiguchi, Tokitsu-cho, Toki City - Kawai, Izumi-cho, Toki City
- Mizunami Bypass (瑞浪バイパス) L=7.9km
  Yamanouchi, Akiyo-cho, Mizunami City, Toki-cho, Mizunami City
- Ena Bypass (恵那バイパス) L=4.47km
  Nakano, Nagashima-cho, Ena City - Ōi-cho, Ena City
- Nakatsugawa Bypass (中津川バイパス) L=7.7km
  Sendambayashi, Nakatsugawa City - Ochiai, Nakatsugawa City
- Agematsu Bypass (上松バイパス) L=2.7km
  Ogawa, Agematsu Town - Agematsu, Agematsu Town
- Kakehashi Improvement (桟改良) L=2.7km
  Agematsu, Agematsu Town - Fukushima, Kiso Town
- Sakurazawa Improvement (桜沢改良) L=2.1km
  Niekawa, Shiojiri City - Sōga, Shiojiri City
- Matsumoto Bypass (松本バイパス) L=6.1km
  Hiratahigashi, Matsumoto City - Shinbashi, Matsumoto City
- Naganominami Bypass (長野南バイパス) L=6.9km
  Komatsubara, Shinonoi, Nagano City - Ōtsuka, Aokijima-cho, Nagano City
