= Route 4 (Nagoya Expressway) =

Road in Aichi Prefecture, Japan

Nagoya Expressway No.4 Tōkai Route
- 名古屋高速道路4号東海線
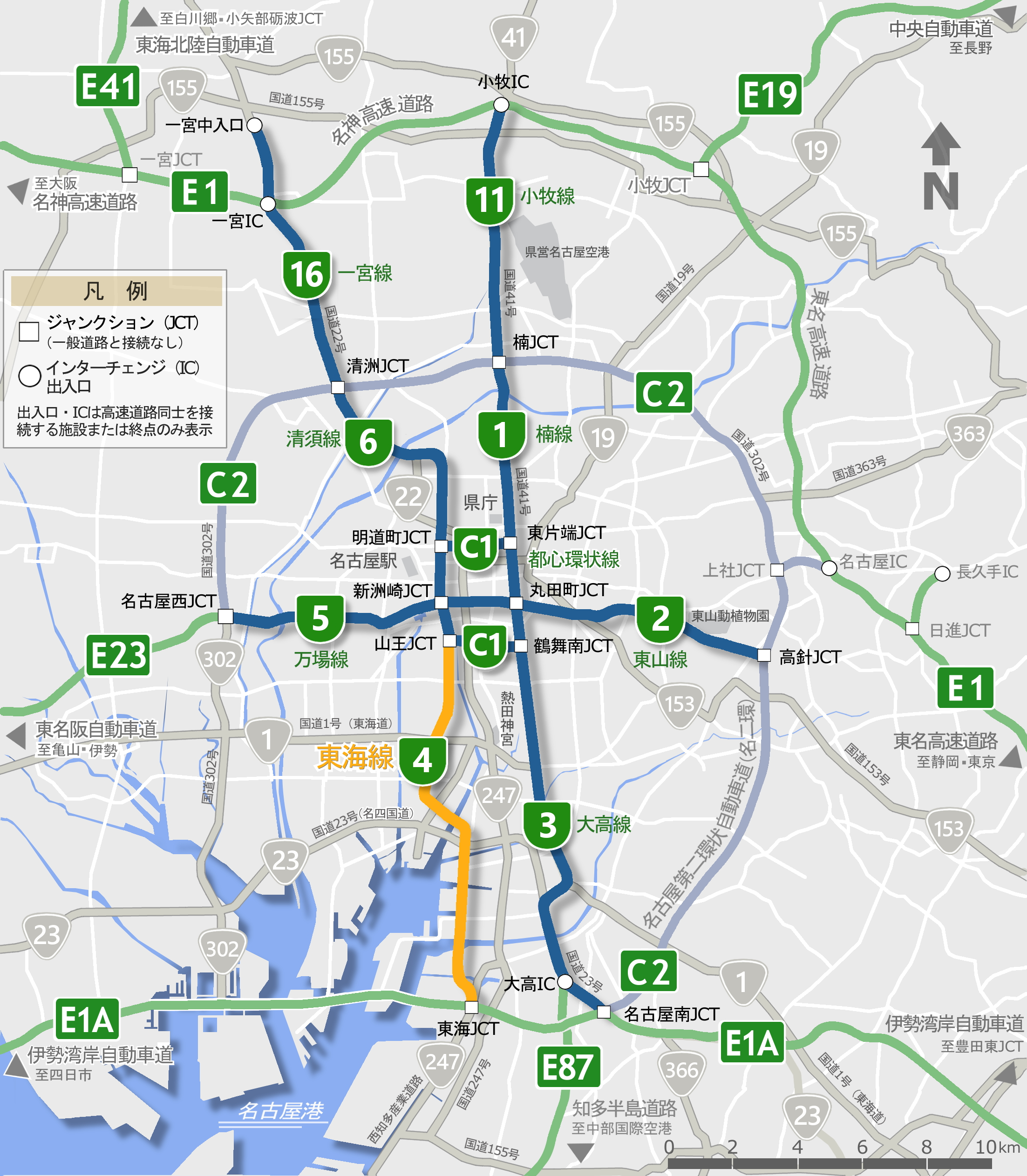

Route information
- Length: 12.0 km (7.5 mi)
- Existed: 2010–present

Major junctions
- From: Sannō Junction in Nakagawa-ku, Nagoya; Nagoya Expressway Ring Route
- To: Tōkai Junction in Tōkai, Aichi; National Route 247 / Isewangan Expressway

Location
- Country: Japan

Highway system
- National highways of Japan; Expressways of Japan

Nagoya Expressway Route 4 Tōkai Route (名古屋高速道路4号東海線, Nagoya Kōsokudōro Yongō Tōkaisen) is an urban expressway in Nagoya and Tōkai, Aichi, Japan. It is a part of the Nagoya Expressway network and is owned and operated by Nagoya Expressway Public Corporation.

== Route description ==
Originating from a junction with the Ring Route, it extends southward to the city of Tōkai and the Isewangan Expressway. The route serves as an alternate access route to Chubu International Airport and was built to reduce traffic congestion on Route 3. The expressway has 2 lanes in each direction for its entire length.

== History ==
The expressway was completed in stages between 2010 and 2013. During the COVID-19 pandemic, six tollgates were closed along the Tōkai and Manba routes after a tollgate operator was found to be infected with the virus.

== Junction list ==
Note: All exit numbers and names are provisional.

- JCT - junction, TB - toll gate

No.	Name	Connections	Notes	Location (all in Aichi)
JCT	Sannō JCT	Nagoya Expressway Ring Route		Nakagawa-ku, Nagoya
401 411	Otōbashi Interchange	Pref. Route 107 (Nakagawa Nakamura Route)	401 - South-bound entrance 411 - North-bound exit	Nakagawa-ku, Nagoya
402 412	Saikōtoori Interchange		402 - South-bound exit 412 - North-bound entrance	Atsuta-ku, Nagoya
403 413	Rokubanchō Interchange		403 - South-bound entrance 413 - North-bound exit	Atsuta-ku, Nagoya
404 414	Kōmeichō Interchange		404 - South-bound exit 414 - North-bound entrance	Minato-ku, Nagoya
405 415	Ryūguchō Interchange		405 - South-bound entrance 415 - North-bound exit	Minato-ku, Nagoya
406 416	Funamichō Interchange		406 - South-bound exit 416 - North-bound entrance	Minato-ku, Nagoya
407 417	Tōkai Interchange	Pref. Route 55 (Nagoya Handa Route)	407 - South-bound exit 417 - North-bound entrance	Tōkai
TB	Tōkai Toll Gate		North-bound only	Tōkai
JCT	Tōkai JCT	National Route 247 / Isewangan Expressway		Tōkai
