= Route 1 (Nagoya Expressway) =

Road in Nagoya, Japan

Nagoya Expressway No.1 Kusunoki Route
- 名古屋高速道路1号楠線

Route information
- Length: 5.6 km (3.5 mi)
- Existed: 1988–present

Major junctions
- From: Higashi-Kataha Junction in Higashi-ku, Nagoya; Nagoya Expressway Ring Route
- To: Kusunoki Junction in Kita-ku, Nagoya; Nagoya Expressway Komaki Route; Mei-Nikan Expressway

Location
- Country: Japan

Highway system
- National highways of Japan; Expressways of Japan

Nagoya Expressway Route 1 Kusunoki Route (名古屋高速道路1号楠線, Nagoya Kōsokudōro Ichigō Kusunokisen) is an urban expressway in Nagoya, Japan. It is a part of the Nagoya Expressway network and is owned and operated by Nagoya Expressway Public Corporation.

== Overview ==
The route extends northward from its junction with the Ring Route and continues until its junction with the Higashi-Meihan Expressway. It is 4 lanes for its entire length and was built as an elevated expressway above the median of National Route 41. The first section of the route was opened to traffic in 1988 and the entire route was completed in 1995.

NEX Plaza, an information center run by Nagoya Expressway Public Corporation, is sandwiched in the middle of a looping ramp that makes up part of Kurokawa Interchange.

== Interchange list ==
- JCT - junction, TB - toll gate

No.	Name	Connections	Notes	Location (all in Nagoya)
JCT	Higashi-Kataha JCT	Nagoya Expressway Ring Route		Higashi-ku
101	Higashi-Kataha Entrance	National Route 41	North-bound only	Higashi-ku
102 103 112 113	Kurokawa Interchange		102 - North-bound exit 103 - North-bound entrance 112 - South-bound entrance 113 - South-bound exit	Kita-ku
TB	Kusunoki Toll Gate		South-bound only	Kita-ku
104 114	Kusunoki Interchange	National Route 41; National Route 302	104 - North-bound exit 114 - South-bound entrance	Kita-ku
(13)	Kusunoki JCT	Mei-Nikan Expressway		Kita-ku
Through to Nagoya Expressway Komaki Route
