= Isewangan Expressway =

Expressway in Aichi and Mie Prefectures, Japan

Isewangan Expressway
- 伊勢湾岸自動車道

Route information
- Length: 56.4 km (35.0 mi)
- Existed: 1985–present

Major junctions
- From: Toyota-higashi Junction in Toyota, Aichi (35.0441°N 137.1911°E) Shin-Tōmei Expressway; Tōkai-Kanjō Expressway
- To: Yokkaichi-kita Junction in Yokkaichi, Mie (35.0378°N 136.6304°E) Shin-Meishin Expressway; Tōkai-Kanjō Expressway

Location
- Country: Japan
- Major cities: Nagoya, Kuwana

Highway system
- National highways of Japan; Expressways of Japan

The Isewangan Expressway (伊勢湾岸自動車道, Isewangan Jidōshadō) is a national expressway in the Tōkai region of Japan. It is owned and operated by Central Nippon Expressway Company.

== Naming ==
The route primarily follows the north shore of Ise Bay (wangan means bayshore in Japanese).

Officially, the route has three designations. The section from Toyota-higashi Junction to Tōkai Junction is referred to as part of the Second Tōkai Expressway. The section from Tōkai Junction to Tobishima Interchange is referred to as part of National Route 302. This section is not classified as a national expressway but rather as a national highway for motor vehicles only with national expressway concurrency. There is no difference in the design standard of this section compared with the rest of the expressway. Finally, the section from Tobishima Interchange to Yokkaichi-kita Junction is referred to as part of the Kinki Expressway Nagoya Kobe Route.

== Overview ==
The Isewangan is planned to link the future Shin-Tōmei Expressway to the east and Shin-Meishin Expressway to the west. These 3 expressways will replace the Tōmei Expressway and Meishin Expressway as the primary roadway linking Tokyo, Nagoya, and Osaka.

The first segment (Meikō-Chūō Interchange to Tobishima Interchange) was opened in 1985 as the Isewangan Road and the most recent addition was opened in 2005. The final segment (Yokkaichi Junction to Yokkaichi-kita Junction) is planned to connect with extensions to the Shin-Meishin Expressway and Tōkai-Kanjō Expressway. The route is 6 lanes for its entire length.

The expressway features several bridges. Three bridges span the Nagoya Port area (collectively known as the Meikō Triton) and two bridges span the Kiso River and Ibi River (collectively known as the Twinkle Bridges).

== List of interchanges and features ==
- IC - interchange, JCT - junction, PA - parking area, BR - bridge

No.	Name	Connections	Dist. from Origin	Dist. from Terminus	Notes	Location	
Through to Shin-Tōmei Expressway
1	Toyota-higashi JCT	Tōkai-Kanjō Expressway	0.0	56.4		Toyota	Aichi
BR	Toyota Arrows Bridge		↓	↑	Yahagi River crossing Cable-stayed bridge, Length - 820 m	Toyota	Aichi
2	Toyota-higashi IC	National Route 248	3.1	53.3		Toyota	Aichi
(19-1)	Toyota JCT	Tōmei Expressway	5.0	51.4		Toyota	Aichi
3	Toyota-minami IC	Pref. Route 56 (Nagoya Okazaki Route)	12.6	43.8		Toyota	Aichi
PA	Kariya PA		15.9	40.5	Highway Oasis	Kariya	Aichi
4	Toyoake IC	National Route 1 National Route 23 (Meishi Highway/Chiryū Bypass); Pref. Route 57 (Seto Ōbu Tōkai Route)	20.2	36.2		Toyoake	Aichi
5	Nagoya-minami JCT	Mei-Nikan Expressway; Nagoya Expressway Ōdaka Route	25.5	30.9		Midori-ku, Nagoya	Aichi
5	Nagoya-minami IC	National Route 23 (Meishi Highway)	25.5	30.9	Toyota-bound exit, Yokkaichi-bound entrance only	Midori-ku, Nagoya	Aichi
6	Ōbu IC	Chitahantō Road (Ōbu-nishi IC); National Route 302	27.0	29.4		Ōbu	Aichi
6	Ōbu IC	Chitahantō Road (Ōbu-nishi IC); National Route 302	27.0	29.4		Tōkai	Aichi
7	Tōkai IC	National Route 302; National Route 247	29.9	26.5		Tōkai	Aichi
7-1	Tōkai JCT	Nagoya Expressway Tōkai Route	29.9	26.5		Tōkai	Aichi
BR	Meikō-higashi Bridge		↓	↑	Cable-stayed bridge Length - 700 m	Tōkai	Aichi
BR	Meikō-higashi Bridge		↓	↑	Cable-stayed bridge Length - 700 m	Minato-ku, Nagoya	Aichi
8	Meikō-Shiomi IC	Pref. Route 225 (Nagoya Higashi Kō Route)	32.4	24.0		Minato-ku, Nagoya	Aichi
BR	Meikō-chūō Bridge		↓	↑	Cable-stayed bridge Length - 1,170 m	Minato-ku, Nagoya	Aichi
9	Meikō-chūō IC		34.8	21.6		Minato-ku, Nagoya	Aichi
BR	Meikō-nishi Bridge		↓	↑	Cable-stayed bridge Length - 758 m	Minato-ku, Nagoya	Aichi
BR	Meikō-nishi Bridge		↓	↑	Cable-stayed bridge Length - 758 m	Tobishima	Aichi
10	Tobishima IC	National Route 302	37.6	18.8		Tobishima	Aichi
10-1	Tobishima JCT	Mei-Nikan Expressway	-	-		Tobishima	Aichi
11	Wangan-Yatomi IC	Pref. Route 71 (Nagoya Nishi Kō Route)	40.5	15.9	Yokkaichi-bound exit, Toyota-bound entrance only	Yatomi	Aichi
12	Yatomi-Kisozaki IC	Pref. Route 103 (Yokkaichi Suzuka Route)	43.3	13.1	Toyota-bound exit, Yokkaichi-bound entrance only	Yatomi	Aichi
BR	Kisogawa Bridge		↓	↑	Length - 1,145m	Yatomi	
BR	Kisogawa Bridge		↓	↑	Length - 1,145m	Kuwana	Mie
13/PA	Wangan-Nagashima IC/PA	Pref. Route 7 (Suigō Kōen Route)	45.9	10.5		Kuwana	Mie
BR	Ibigawa Bridge		↓	↑	Length - 1,397m	Kuwana	Mie
14	Wangan-Kuwana IC	Pref. Route 69 (Wangan-Kuwana Inter Route)	48.4	8.0		Kuwana	Mie
BR	Inabegawa Bridge		↓	↑		Kuwana	Mie
BR	Inabegawa Bridge		↓	↑		Kawagoe	Mie
15	Mie-Kawagoe IC	National Route 23 (Meishi Highway); Pref. Route 401 (Kuwana Yokkaichi Route)	50.2	6.2		Kawagoe	Mie
16	Mie-Asahi IC	Pref. Route 66 (Yokkaichi Asahi Route)	54.2	2.2	Toyota-bound exit, Yokkaichi-bound entrance only	Yokkaichi	Mie
(29-1)	Yokkaichi JCT	Higashi-Meihan Expressway	56.4	0.0		Yokkaichi	Mie
Through to Shin-Meishin Expressway

== Gallery ==
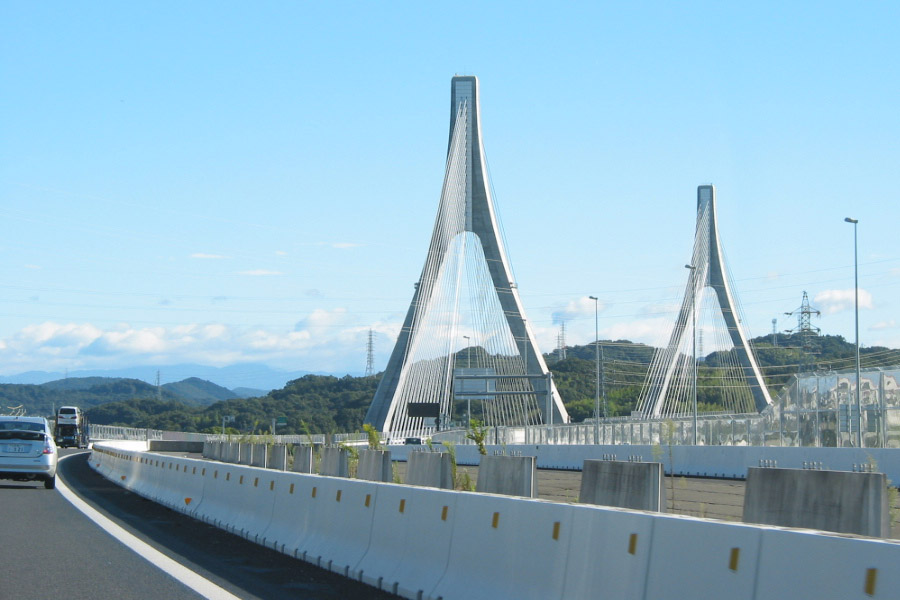
Toyota Arrows Bridge

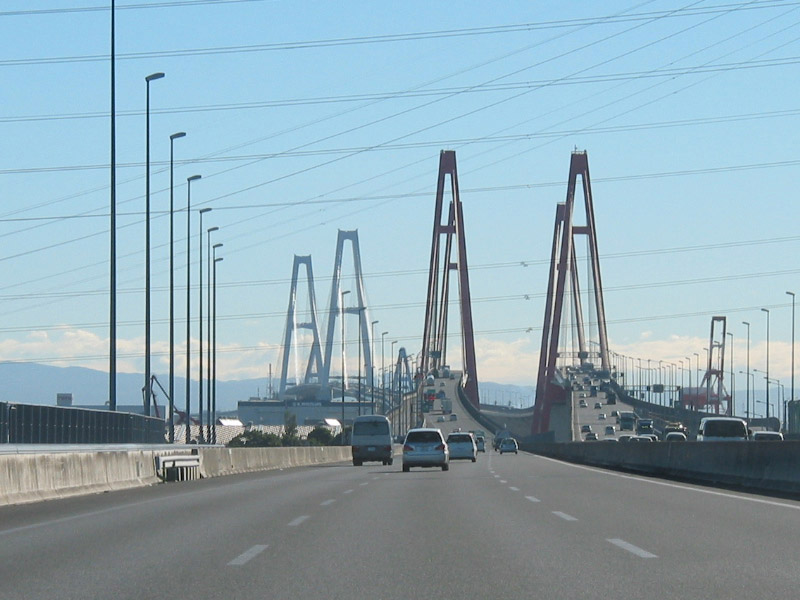
Meikō Triton view from the west

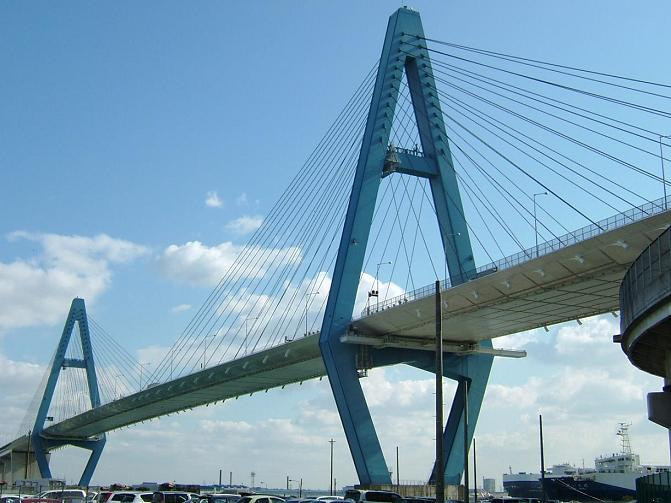
Meikō-higashi Bridge

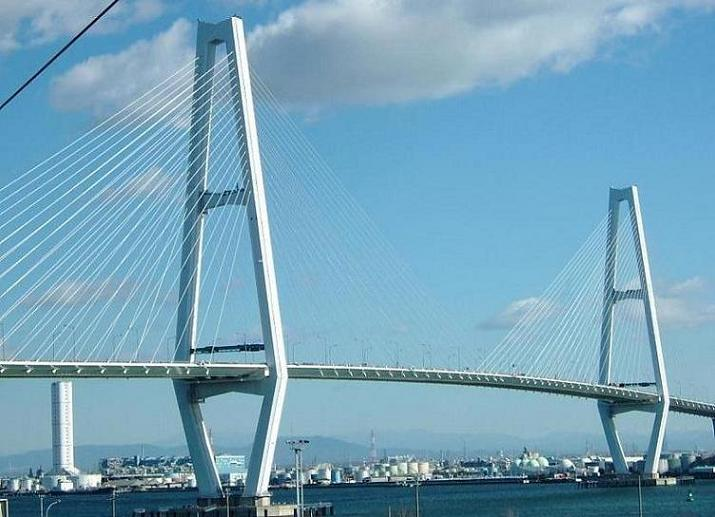
Meikō-chūō Bridge

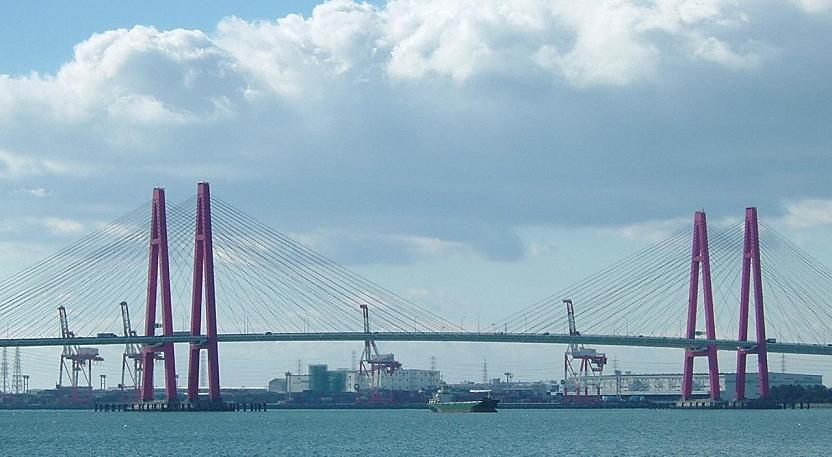
Meikō-nishi Bridge

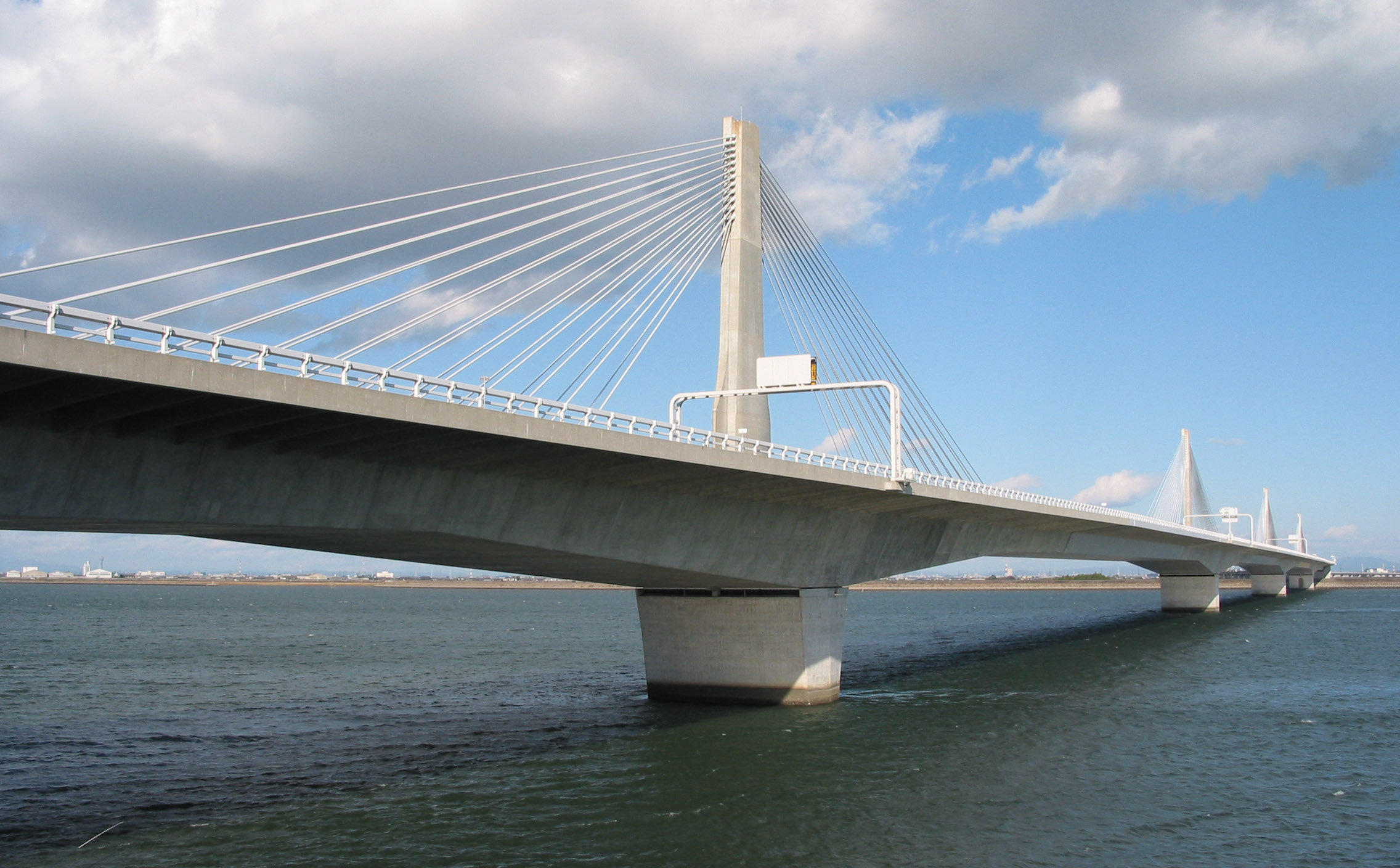
Twinkle Kisogawa Bridge

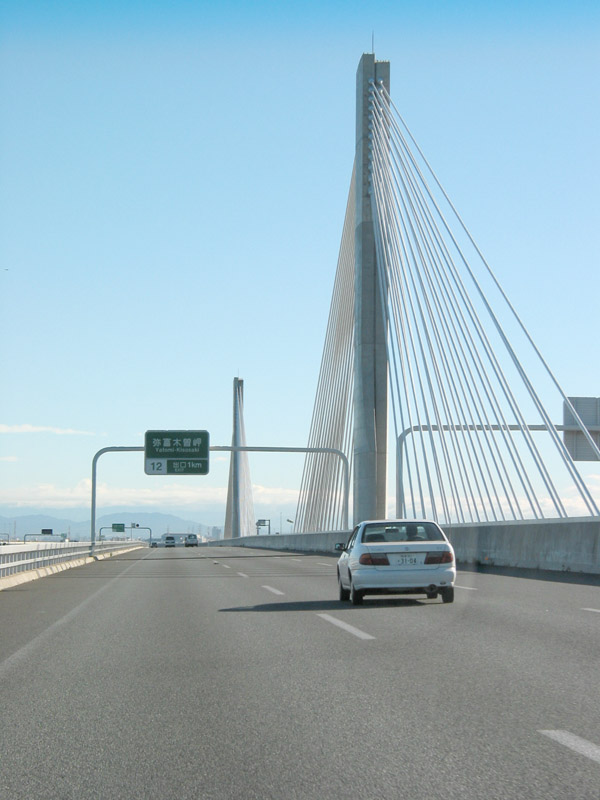
Twinkle Kisogawa Bridge

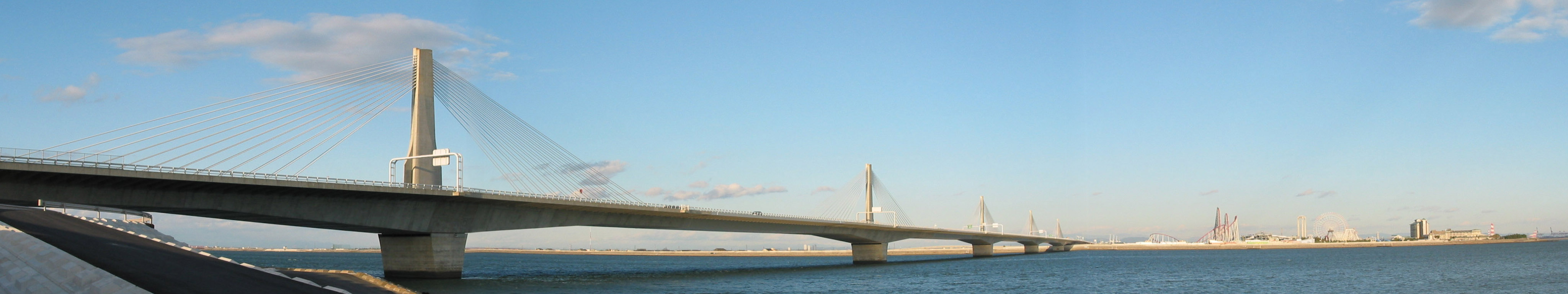
Twinkle Ibigawa Bridge and Nagashima Spaland

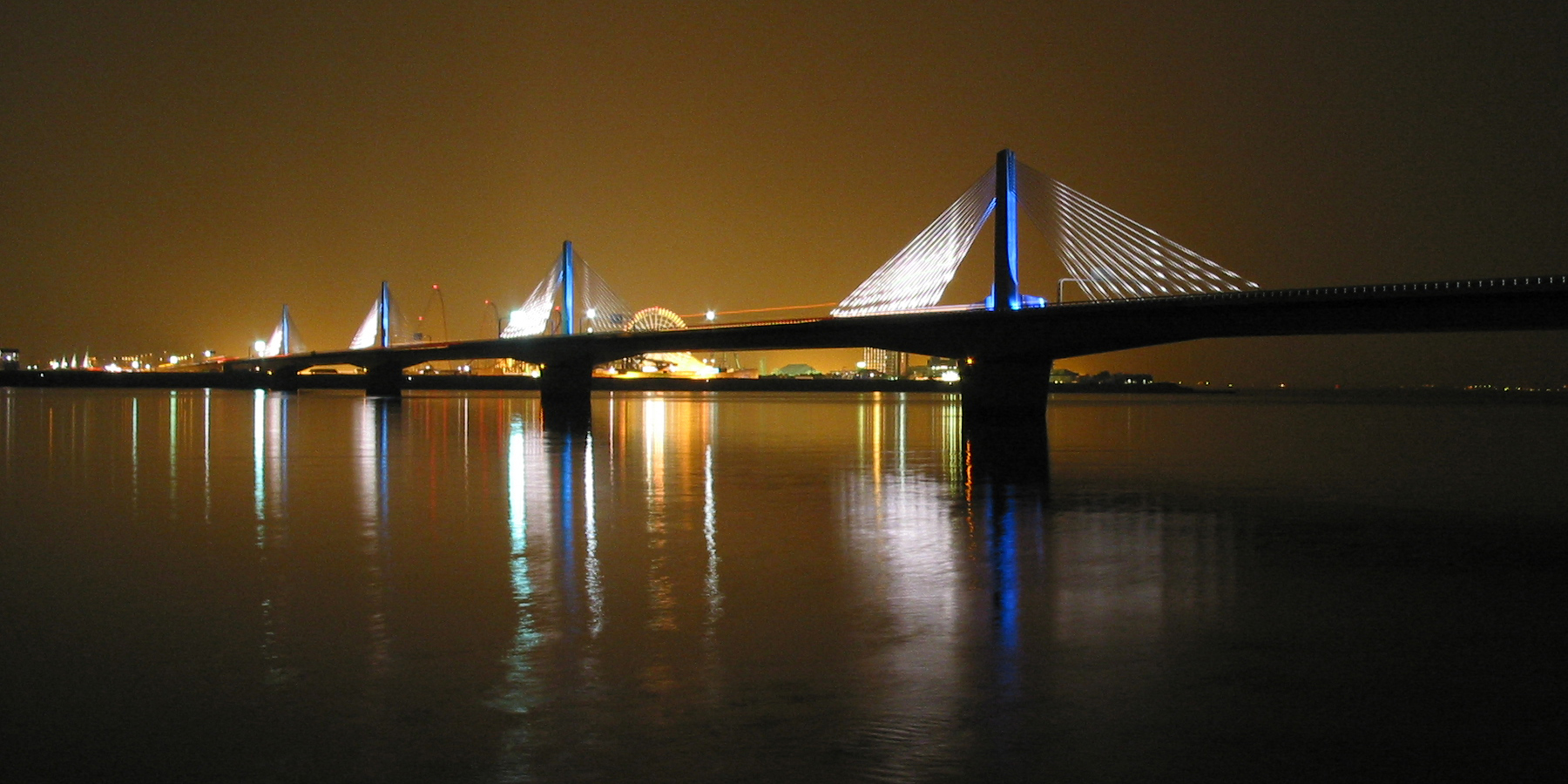
Twinkle Ibigawa Bridge at night

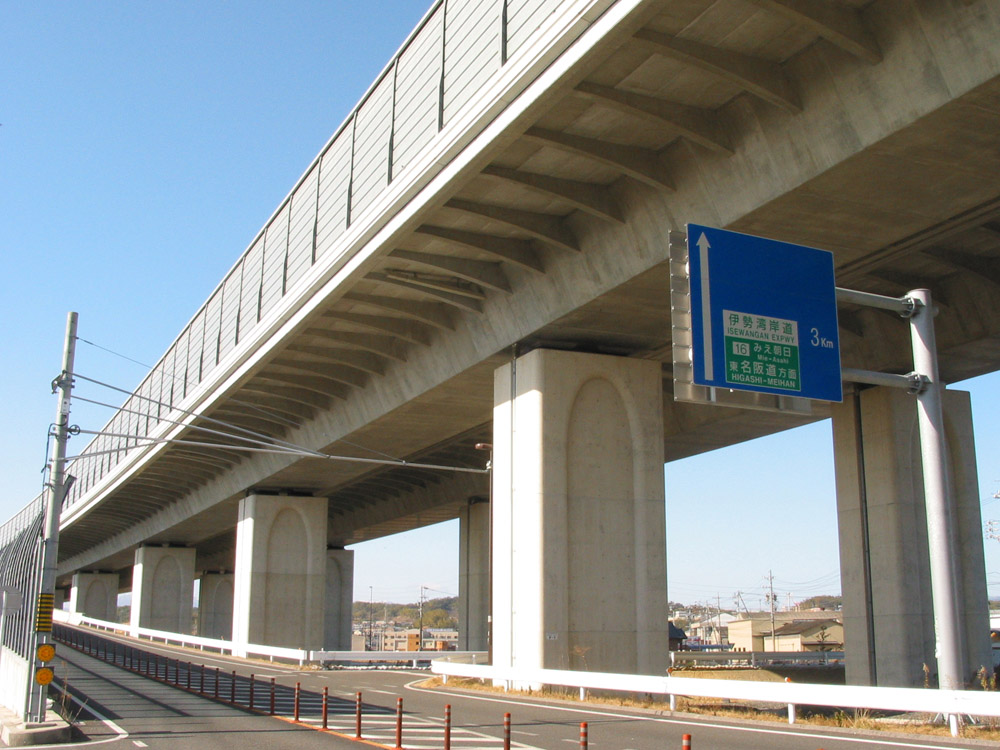
Furukawa Viaduct
