= Route 11 (Nagoya Expressway) =

Road in Aichi Prefecture, Japan

Nagoya Expressway No.11 Komaki Route
- 名古屋高速道路11号小牧線
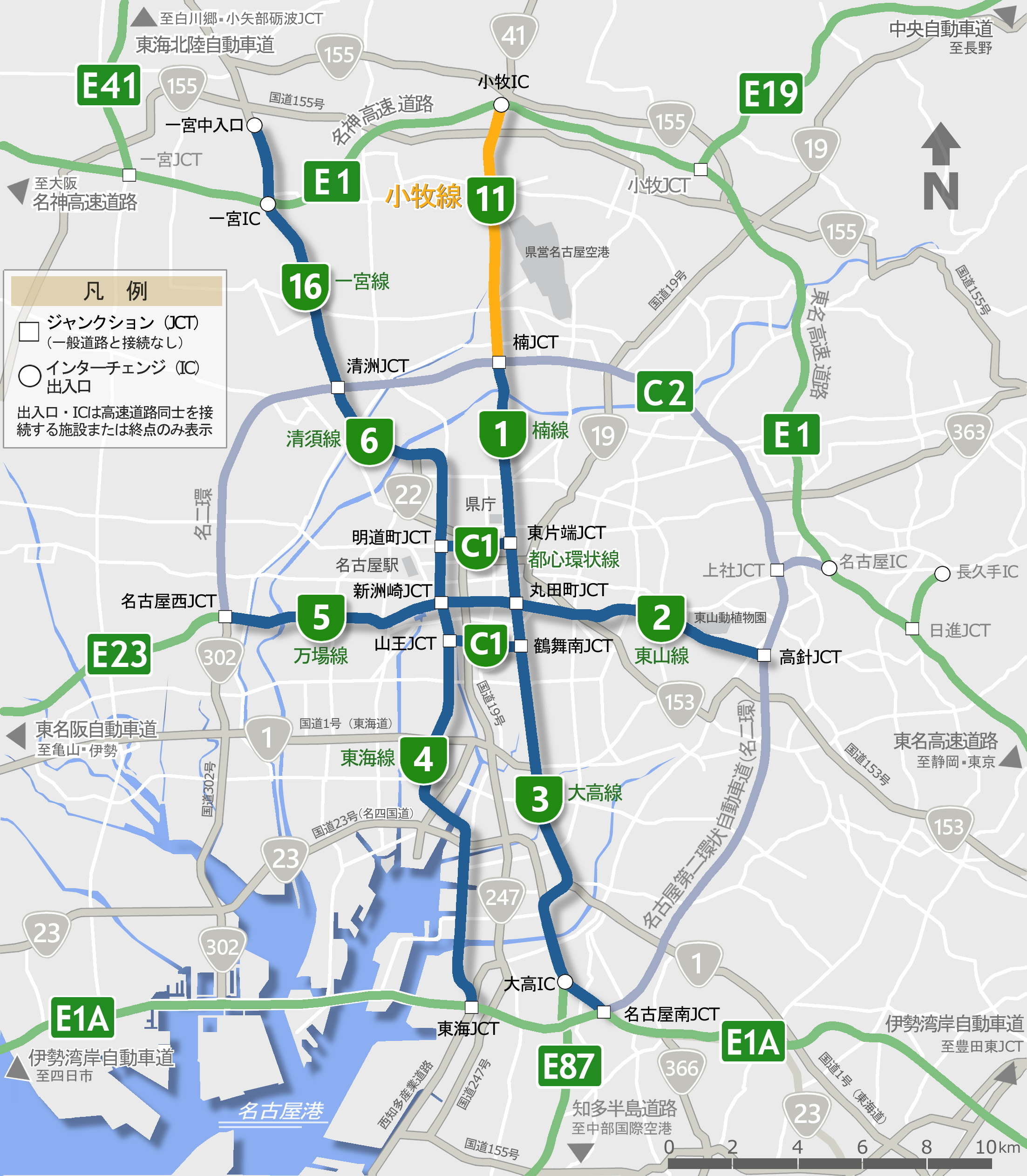

Route information
- Length: 8.2 km (5.1 mi)
- Existed: 2001–present

Major junctions
- From: Kusunoki Junction in Kita-ku, Nagoya; Nagoya Expressway Kusunoki Route; Higashi-Meihan Expressway
- To: Komaki-kita Interchange in Komaki, Aichi; Meishin Expressway; Tōmei Expressway; National Route 41

Location
- Country: Japan

Highway system
- National highways of Japan; Expressways of Japan

Nagoya Expressway Route 11 Komaki Route (名古屋高速道路11号小牧線, Nagoya Kōsokudōro Jūichigō Komakisen) is an urban expressway in Nagoya and Komaki, Aichi, Japan. It is a part of the Nagoya Expressway network and is owned and operated by Nagoya Expressway Public Corporation.

== Overview ==
The route is a northward extension of Route 1 which terminates at its junction with the Higashi-Meihan Expressway. Route 11 continues as an elevated expressway above the median of National Route 41. The terminus is at Komaki-kita Interchange, which also provides direct access to the Meishin Expressway and Tōmei Expressway

The expressway is 4 lanes for its entire length and was opened to traffic in 2001. The toll is 350 yen for passenger cars and light trucks (including 2-wheeled vehicles) and 700 yen for large trucks and buses.

Electronic Toll Collection (ETC) is not accepted at the entrance of Horinouchi Interchange. However, the toll at this entrance is only 200 yen for passenger cars. The same discounted toll applies to vehicles entering or exiting the route from Toyoyama-minami Interchange at the southern end of the route, however these toll booths accept ETC.

== Interchange list ==
- JCT - junction, TB - toll gate

No.	Name	Connections	Notes	Location (all in Aichi)
Through to Nagoya Expressway Kusunoki Route
(13)	Kusunoki JCT	Mei-Nikan Expressway		Kita-ku, Nagoya
1101 1111	Toyoyama-minami Interchange	National Route 41	1101 - North-bound exit 1111 - South-bound entrance	Kita-ku, Nagoya
1102	Ōyamagawa Toll Gate		North-bound only	Toyoyama
1103 1113	Toyoyama-kita Interchange	National Route 41	1103 - North-bound entrance 1113 - South-bound exit	Toyoyama
1104 1114	Komaki-minami Interchange	National Route 41	1104 - North-bound exit 1114 - South-bound entrance	Komaki
1105 1115	Horinouchi Interchange	National Route 41	1105 - North-bound entrance (Discounted toll, cash only); 1115 - South-bound exit	Komaki
TB	Komaki Toll Gate		South-bound only	Komaki
1106 1116	Komaki Interchange / Komaki-kita Interchange	Meishin Expressway (Komaki Interchange); Tōmei Expressway (Komaki Interchange); National Route 41	1106 - North-bound exit 1116 - South-bound entrance	Komaki
