= Route 5 (Nagoya Expressway) =

Road in Nagoya, Japan

Nagoya Expressway No.5 Manba Route
- 名古屋高速道路5号万場線

Route information
- Length: 6.8 km (4.2 mi)
- Existed: 1986–present

Major junctions
- From: Shinsuzaki Junction in Nakamura-ku, Nagoya; Nagoya Expressway Higashiyama Route; Nagoya Expressway Inner circle route
- To: Nagoya-nishi Junction in Nakagawa-ku, Nagoya; Mei-Nikan Expressway; National Route 302

Location
- Country: Japan

Highway system
- National highways of Japan; Expressways of Japan

Nagoya Expressway Route 5 Manba Route (名古屋高速道路5号万場線, Nagoya Kōsokudōro Gogō Manbasen) is an urban expressway in Nagoya, Japan. It is a part of the Nagoya Expressway network and is owned and operated by Nagoya Expressway Public Corporation.

== Route description ==
The route originates from a junction with the Ring Route and extends westward; Route 2 also originates from this same point and extends eastward. The route eventually terminates at a junction with the Higashi-Meihan Expressway.

The expressway is 4 lanes for its entire length.

== History ==
During the COVID-19 pandemic, six tollgates were closed along the Manba and Tōkai routes after a tollgate operator was found to be infected with the virus.

== Interchange list ==
- JCT - junction, TB - toll gate

| No. | Name | Connections | Notes | Location (all in Nagoya) |
Through to Nagoya Expressway Higashiyama Route
| JCT | Shinsuzaki JCT | Nagoya Expressway Ring Route | | Nakamura-ku |
| 501 511 | Kogane Interchange | | 501 - West-bound exit 511 - East-bound entrance | Nakagawa-ku |
| 502 512 | Kasumori Interchange | Pref. Route 115 (Tsushima Shippō Nagoya Route) | 502 - West-bound entrance 512 - East-bound exit | Nakamura-ku |
| TB | Sennonji Toll Gate | | East-bound only | Nakagawa-ku |
| 503 513 | Sennonji Interchange | Pref. Route 115 (Tsushima Shippō Nagoya Route); National Route 302 | 503 - East-bound exit 513 - West-bound entrance | Nakagawa-ku |
| (23) | Nagoya-nishi JCT | Mei-Nikan Expressway | | Nakagawa-ku |
Through to Higashi-Meihan Expressway
