= E1A =

E1A may refer to:

- Adenovirus early region 1A, a gene
- Haplogroup E1a
- Shin-Tōmei Expressway (main route), Isewangan Expressway and Shin-Meishin Expressway, route E1A in Japan.
