= Route 6 (Nagoya Expressway) =

Road in Aichi Prefecture, Japan

Nagoya Expressway No.6 Kiyosu Route
- 名古屋高速道路6号清須線
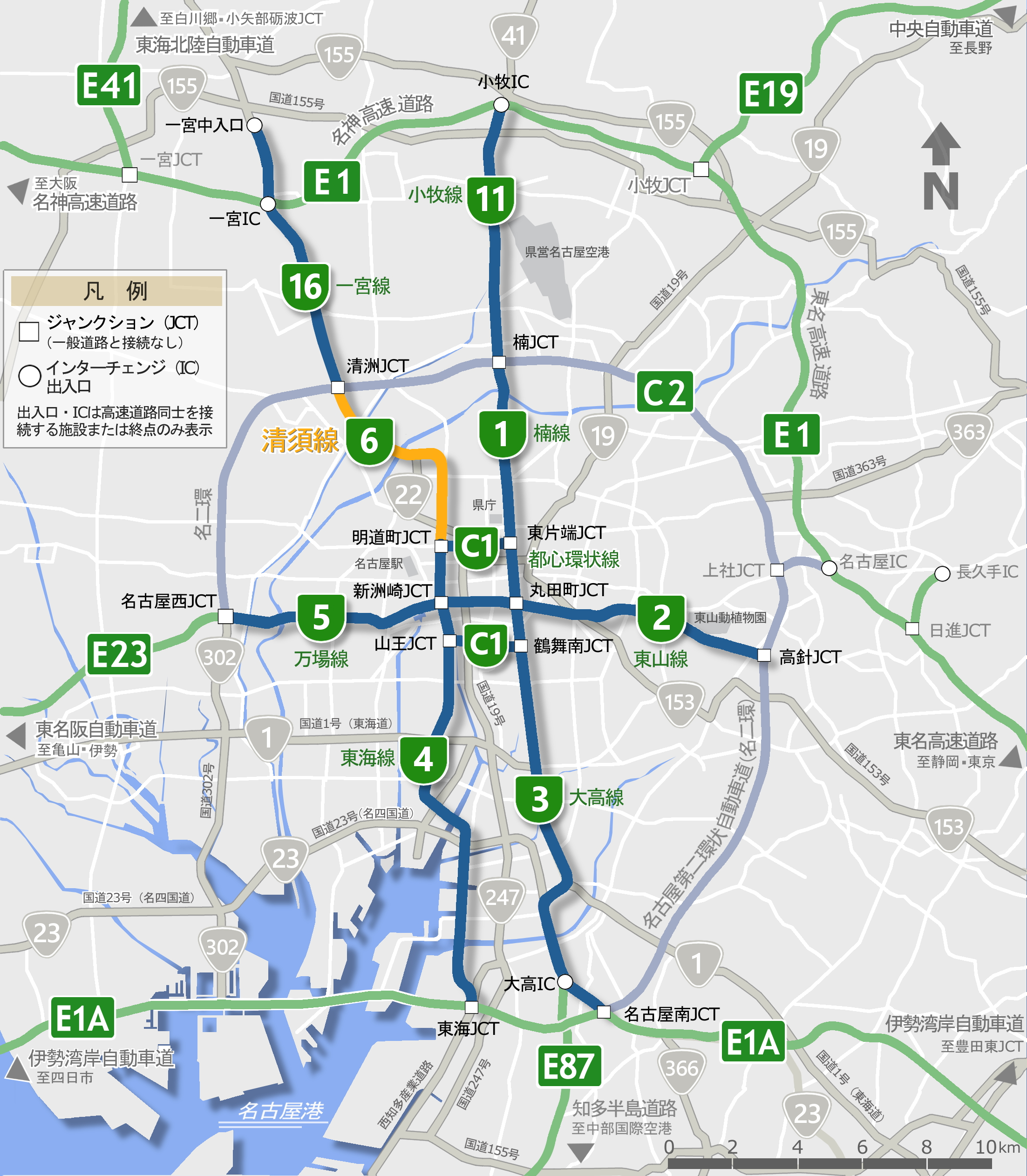

Route information
- Length: 7 km (4.3 mi)
- Existed: 2007–present

Major junctions
- From: Meidōchō Junction in Nishi-ku, Nagoya; Nagoya Expressway Ring Route
- To: Kiyosu Junction in Kiyosu, Aichi; Nagoya Expressway Ichinomiya Route; Higashi-Meihan Expressway

Location
- Country: Japan

Highway system
- National highways of Japan; Expressways of Japan

Nagoya Expressway Route 6 Kiyosu Route (名古屋高速道路6号清須線, Nagoya Kōsokudōro Rokugō Kiyosusen) is an urban expressway in Nagoya and Kiyosu, Aichi, Japan. It is a part of the Nagoya Expressway network and is owned and operated by Nagoya Expressway Public Corporation.

== Overview ==
The route originates from a junction with the Ring Route and extends northward to a junction with the Higashi-Meihan Expressway. Past this junction, Route 16 serves as an extension of Route 6 to Ichinomiya (a separate toll is required).

The route was completed in December 2007. As of March 2008 it is the most recent addition to the Nagoya Expressway network. It is 4 lanes for its entire length.

== Interchange list ==
- JCT - junction, TB - toll gate

No.	Name	Connections	Notes	Location (all in Aichi)
JCT	Meidōchō JCT	Nagoya Expressway Ring Route		Nishi-ku, Nagoya
601 611	Meidōchō Interchange	Pref. Route 63 (Nagoya Kōnan Route)	601 - North-bound entrance 611 - South-bound exit	Nishi-ku, Nagoya
602 612	Shōnaidōri Interchange	Pref. Route 63 (Nagoya Kōnan Route)	602 - North-bound exit 612 - South-bound entrance	Nishi-ku, Nagoya
603 613	Torimichō Interchange	National Route 22 (Meigi Bypass)	603 - North-bound entrance 613 - South-bound exit	Nishi-ku, Nagoya
TB	Kiyosu Toll Gate		South-bound only	Kiyosu
604 614	Kiyosu Interchange	National Route 22 (Meigi Bypass)	604 - North-bound exit 614 - South-bound entrance	Kiyosu
(17-1)	Kiyosu JCT	Mei-Nikan Expressway		Kiyosu
Through to Nagoya Expressway Ichinomiya Route
