= Oharu =

Oharu may refer to:

- Ōharu, Aichi, a place in Japan
- The Life of Oharu, a film
