= Route 2 (Nagoya Expressway) =

Road in Nagoya, Japan

Nagoya Expressway No.2 Higashiyama Route
- 名古屋高速道路2号東山線

Route information
- Length: 10.2 km (6.3 mi)
- Existed: 1988–present

Major junctions
- From: Shinsuzaki Junction in Nakamura-ku, Nagoya; Nagoya Expressway Manba Route
- To: Takabari Junction in Meitō-ku, Nagoya; Mei-Nikan Expressway

Location
- Country: Japan

Highway system
- National highways of Japan; Expressways of Japan

Nagoya Expressway Route 2 Higashiyama Route (名古屋高速道路2号東山線, Nagoya Kōsokudōro Nigō Higashiyamasen) is an urban expressway in Nagoya, Japan. It is a part of the Nagoya Expressway network and is owned and operated by Nagoya Expressway Public Corporation.

== Overview ==
The first section was opened to traffic in 1988 and the entire route was completed in 2003. The expressway is 4 lanes for its entire length.

The route runs from west to east through the center of the city of Nagoya. It begins at Shinsuzaki Junction where it meets the Ring Route and Route 5. Route 2 then bisects the Ring Route, meets it once again at Marutamachi Junction, and continues eastward. The route eventually terminates at a junction with the Higashi-Meihan Expressway.

Originally it was planned that Route 2 would connect to the Higashi-Meihan at Kamiyashiro Junction which connects directly to the Tōmei Expressway. However, local opposition led to the route being moved a short distance south to Takabari Junction. This forces users to pay a relatively expensive toll to access the Tōmei by way of the Higashi-Meihan (500 yen for 2.7 km). A description of the planning of Route 2 can be found here.

In order to combat congestion on the Ring Route, a plan to divert traffic to Route 2 and local roads has been implemented. Vehicles using Electronic Toll Collection (ETC) are permitted use the exit at Fukiage-higashi Interchange and use local roads to reach the entrance of the same interchange without incurring an additional toll, provided exit and re-entry occurs within 15 minutes. Diagrams explaining how to take advantage of the plan can be found here.

== Interchange list ==
- JCT - junction, TB - toll gate

No.	Name	Connections	Notes	Location (all in Nagoya)
Through to Nagoya Expressway Manba Route
JCT	Shinsuzaki JCT		No Route 2 ←→ Ring Route access	Nakamura-ku
201 211	Shirakawa Interchange	National Route 19	201 - East-bound exit 211 - West-bound entrance	Naka-ku
-	Shirakawa-higashi Interchange		Planned	Naka-ku
JCT	Marutamachi JCT	Nagoya Expressway Ring Route	Ring Route inaccessible to east-bound traffic	Naka-ku
202 212	Fukiage-higashi Interchange		202 - East-bound exit 212 - West-bound entrance	Chikusa-ku
203 213	Fukiage-nishi Interchange		203 - East-bound entrance 213 - West-bound exit	Chikusa-ku
204 214	Haruoka Interchange		204 - East-bound entrance 214 - West-bound exit	Chikusa-ku
205 215	Yotsuya Interchange		205 - East-bound exit 215 - West-bound entrance	Shōwa-ku
TB	Takabari Toll Gate		West-bound only	Meitō-ku
206 216	Takabari Interchange	Pref. Route 59 (Nagoya Daini Kanjō Route)	206 - East-bound exit 216 - West-bound entrance	Meitō-ku
(4)	Takabari Junction	Mei-Nikan Expressway		Meitō-ku
