= Komaki Interchange =

Interchange in Komaki, Aichi prefecture, Japan

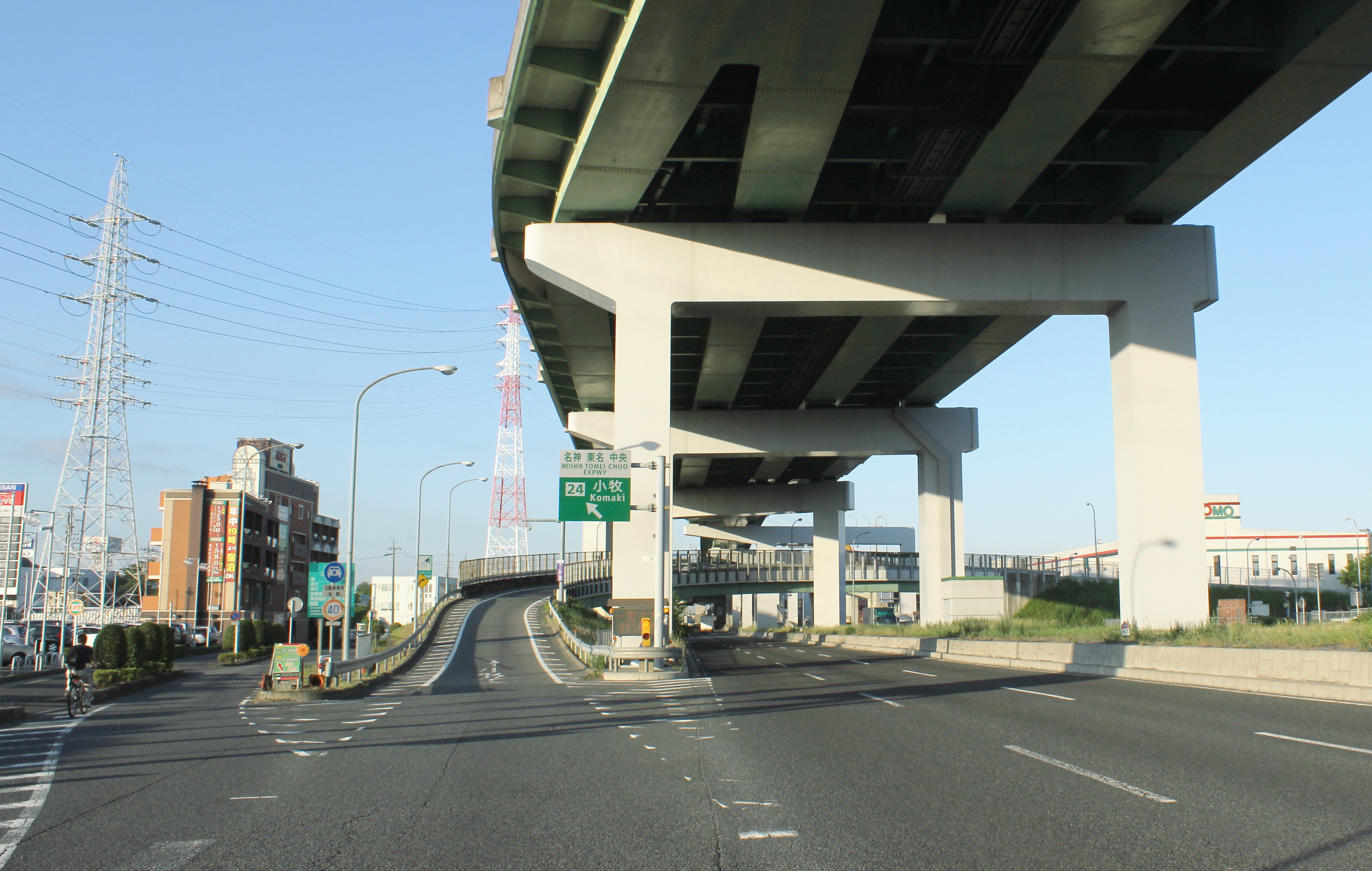

Location
- Komaki, Aichi, Japan
- Coordinates: 35°18′5.7″N 136°54′30.2″E
- Roads at junction: Tōmei Expressway; Meishin Expressway; Nagoya Expressway Route 11

Construction
- Maintained by: Central Nippon Expressway Company

The Komaki Interchange (小牧インターチェンジ) is an interchange of the Tōmei Expressway, Meishin Expressway and Nagoya Expressway Route 11 in Komaki, Aichi, Japan. This is the ending point of the Tomei Expressway and the starting point of the Meishin Expressway.

This is one of the closest interchanges to Nagoya.

== Roads ==
- Tōmei Expressway (Asian Highway Network)
- Meishin Expressway (Asian Highway Network)
- Nagoya Expressway Route 11 (Komaki Route)
- National Route 41
- National Route 155

== History ==
- July 1, 1965: The interchange opened.
- April 25, 1968: Tomei Expressway was opened and connected.
- October 19, 2001: Nagoya Expressway Route 11 was opened and connected.

== Around ==
- Mount Komaki
- Nagoya Airfield
- Park Arena Komaki
