= Ōharu =

Ōharu 大治町
- Town
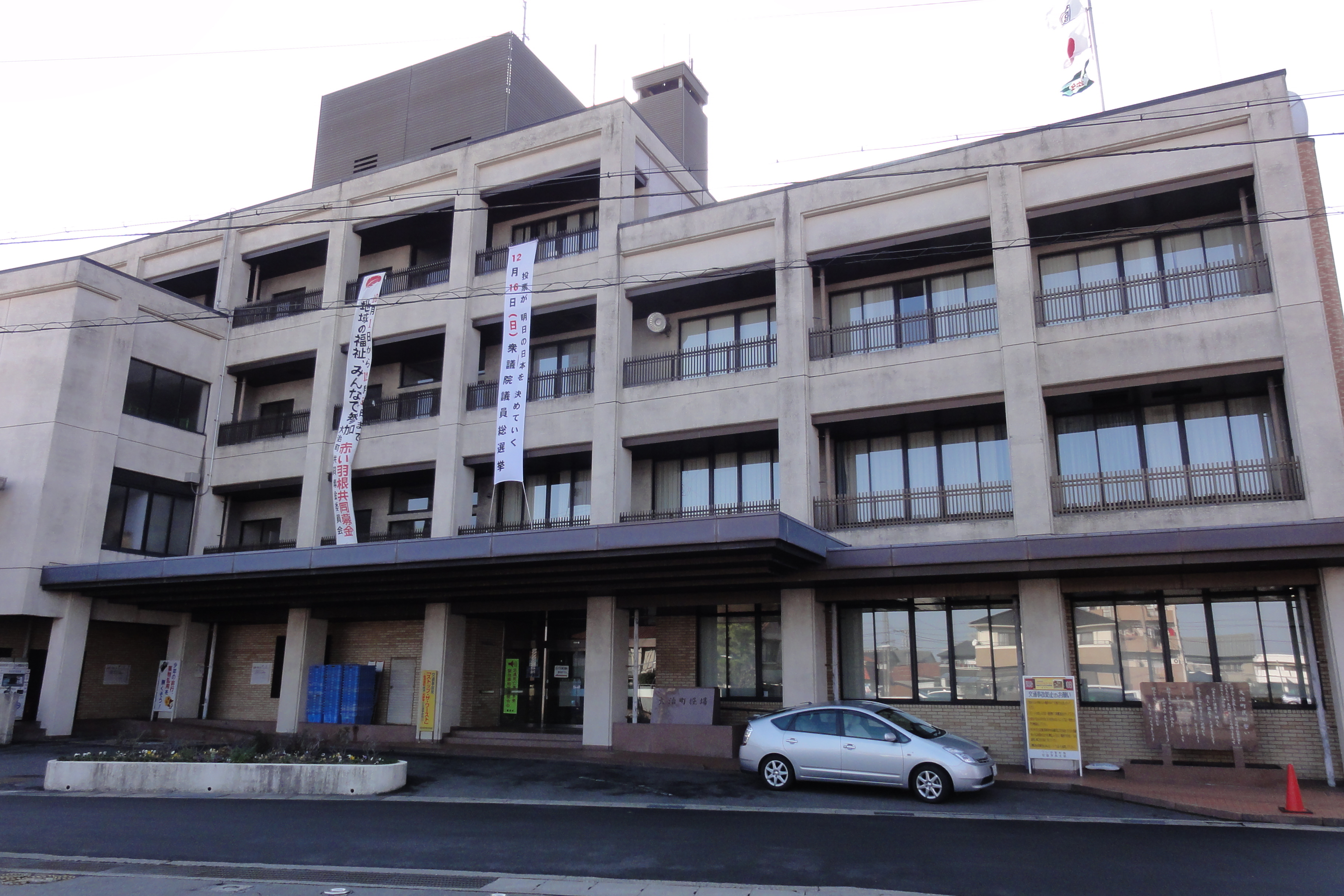
- Ōharu Town hall

- Flag Coat of arms

- Location of Ōharu in Aichi Prefecture

- Coordinates: 35°10′30.2″N 136°49′12.3″E
- Country: Japan
- Region: Chūbu region Tōkai region
- Prefecture: Aichi
- District: Ama

Area
  - Total: 6.59 km^{2} (2.54 sq mi)

Population (October 1, 2019)
  - Total: 32,318
  - Density: 4,900/km^{2} (12,700/sq mi)
- Time zone: UTC+9 (Japan Standard Time)
- Tree: Chinaberry
- Flower: Satsuki azalea
- Phone number: 052 (444) 2711
- Address: 1-1 Daimon-Nishi, Ōharu-chō, Ama-gun, Aichi-ken 490-1192
- Website: Official website

Ōharu (大治町, Ōharu-chō) is a town located in Ama District, Aichi Prefecture, Japan. As of 1 October 2019, the town had an estimated population of 32,318 in 13,683 households, and a population density of 4,904 persons per km². The total area of the town is 6.59 square kilometres (2.54 sq mi).

== Geography ==
Ōharu is located in western Aichi Prefecture, and has developed largely as a commuter town for the neighboring Nagoya metropolis.

=== Neighboring municipalities ===
- Aichi Prefecture
  - Ama
  - Nakagawa-ku, Nagoya
  - Nakamura-ku, Nagoya

== Demographics ==
Per Japanese census data, the population of Ōharu has increased dramatically over the past 50 years.

Historical population
Year	Pop.	±%
1940	5,068	—
1950	6,287	+24.1%
1960	6,455	+2.7%
1970	13,709	+112.4%
1980	19,939	+45.4%
1990	22,598	+13.3%
2000	27,073	+19.8%
2010	29,897	+10.4%

=== Climate ===
The town has a climate characterized by hot and humid summers, and relatively mild winters (Köppen climate classification Cfa).

== History ==
The village of Ōharu was established in 1889 with the establishment of the modern municipalities system. It was raised to town status in 1975. In 2008, discussions were held to merge Ōharu with neighboring Shippō, Jimokuji and Miwa towns. Later three municipalities formed the new city of Ama, but Ōharu withdrew from the negotiations, and remains an independent municipality.

== Education ==
Ōharu has three public elementary schools and one public junior high school operated by the town government. The town does not have a high school.

== Transportation ==
=== Railway ===
Ōharu is not served by any passenger rail transport. The nearest train station is Nakamura Kōen on the Nagoya Municipal Subway’s Higashiyama Line in neighboring Nakamura-ku, Nagoya.

=== Highway ===
- Nagoya Daini Kanjo Expressway
- National Route 302

== Noted people from Ōharu ==
- Kaneyoshi Muto, naval aviator
