= Route 16 (Nagoya Expressway) =

Road in Aichi Prefecture, Japan

Nagoya Expressway No.16 Ichinomiya Route
- 名古屋高速道路16号一宮線
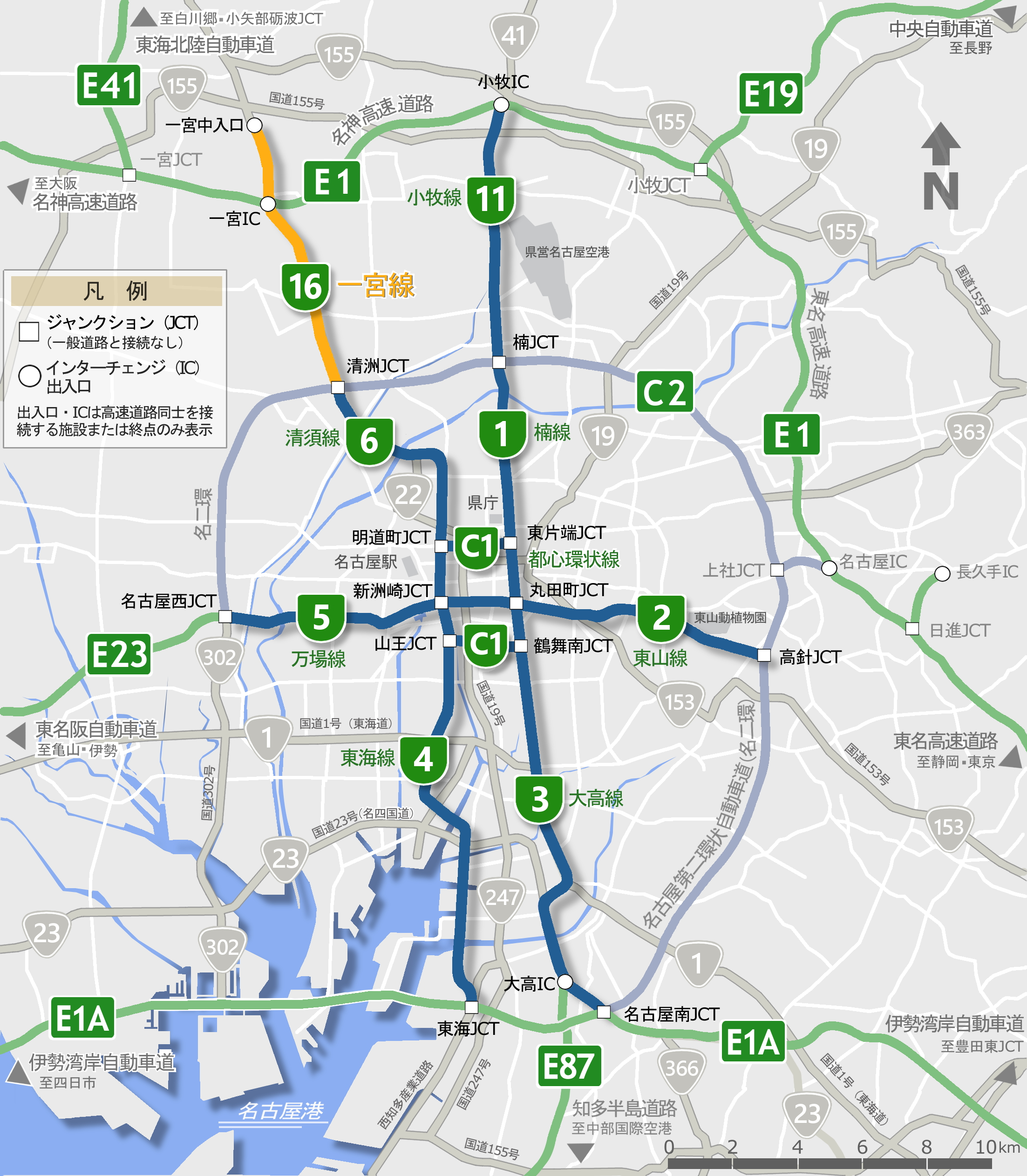

Route information
- Length: 8.9 km (5.5 mi)
- Existed: 2005–present

Major junctions
- From: Kiyosu Junction in Kiyosu, Aichi; Nagoya Expressway Kiyosu Route; Higashi-Meihan Expressway
- To: Ichinomiya-naka Entrance in Ichinomiya, Aichi; National Route 22

Location
- Country: Japan

Highway system
- National highways of Japan; Expressways of Japan

Nagoya Expressway Route 16 Ichinomiya Route (名古屋高速道路16号一宮線, Nagoya Kōsokudōro Jūrokugō Ichinomiyasen) is an urban expressway in Aichi Prefecture, Japan. It is a part of the Nagoya Expressway network and is owned and operated by Nagoya Expressway Public Corporation.

== Overview ==
The route serves as an extension of Route 6, extending northward from its terminus at the Higashi-Meihan Expressway to the city of Ichinomiya. The entire route is built as an elevated expressway above the median of National Route 22 and links to the Meishin Expressway at Ichinomiya Interchange. The north-bound lanes terminate at Ichinomiya-higashi Interchange, while the south-bound lanes continue up to Ichinomiya-naka Entrance.

The route is 4 lanes for its entire length.

The toll is 350 yen for passenger cars and light trucks (including 2-wheeled vehicles). Tolls are collected at each north-bound exit and south-bound entrance. At Ichinomiya Interchange, payment for both the Nagoya Expressway and Meishin Expressway is made at the same toll booth.

== Interchange list ==
- JCT - junction

No.	Name	Connections	Notes	Location (all in Aichi)
Through to Nagoya Expressway Kiyosu Route
(17-1)	Kiyosu JCT	Higashi-Meihan Expressway		Kiyosu
1601 1611	Haruhi Interchange	National Route 22 (Meigi Bypass)	1601 - North-bound entrance 1611 - South-bound exit	Kiyosu
1602 1612	Nishiharu Interchange	National Route 22 (Meigi Bypass)	1602 - North-bound exit 1612 - South-bound entrance	Kitanagoya
1603 1613	Ichinomiya-Nishiharu Interchange	National Route 22 (Meigi Bypass)	1603 - North-bound entrance 1613 - South-bound exit	Ichinomiya
1604	Ichinomiya-minami Exit	National Route 22 (Meigi Bypass)	North-bound only	Ichinomiya
1605 1615	Ichinomiya Interchange	Meishin Expressway	1605 - North-bound exit 1615 - South-bound entrance	Ichinomiya
1606 1616	Ichinomiya-higashi Interchange	National Route 22 (Meigi Bypass)	1606 - North-bound exit, expressway ends 1616 - South-bound entrance	Ichinomiya
1617	Ichinomiya-naka Entrance	National Route 22 (Meigi Bypass)	South-bound only	Ichinomiya
