= Tōkai-Kanjō Expressway =

Road in Aichi Prefecture, Gifu Prefecture and Mie Prefecture in Japan

Tōkai-Kanjō Expressway
- 東海環状自動車道

Route information
- Length: 152.7 km (94.9 mi)
- Existed: 2005–present
- Component highways: National Route 475

Major junctions
- From: Toyota-higashi Junction in Toyota, Aichi; Shin-Tōmei Expressway; Isewangan Expressway
- To: Yokkaichi-kita Junction' in Yokkaichi, Mie; Isewangan Expressway; Shin-Meishin Expressway

Location
- Country: Japan
- Major cities: Seto, Toki, Minokamo

Highway system
- National highways of Japan; Expressways of Japan
← National Route 474	→ National Route 476

The Tōkai-Kanjō Expressway (東海環状自動車道, Tōkaikanjō Jidōsha-dō) (lit. Tōkai Ring Expressway) is a toll road in the Tōkai region of Japan. It is owned and managed by Central Nippon Expressway Company.

== Naming ==
Officially, the route is designated as National Route 475. On some signs, the expressway is represented in Japanese as 東海環状道; this is done to prevent confusion with the Tōkai-Hokuriku Expressway.

Although the road is named as an expressway, it is not recognized as a national expressway. Officially it is a national highway for motor vehicles only (一般国道の自動車専用道路, Ippan Kokudō no Jidōsha Senyō Dōro) (motor vehicles must have a displacement of at least 125 cc). However, the design standard of the Tōkai-Kanjō Expressway is similar to most national expressways.

== Overview ==
Once completed, the expressway will form a 160 km ring road for the Tōkai Region. It is hoped that the expressway will reduce traffic congestion, link important industrial and manufacturing centers in the region, and facilitate access to Chubu International Airport and tourist areas in rural Gifu Prefecture.

Currently 134.6 km of the route has been opened to traffic. This section was opened in 2005 to coincide with the opening of Expo 2005 in Aichi Prefecture. There are 4 lanes of traffic from Toyota-higashi Junction to Toki Junction, and 2 lanes from Toki Junction to Mino-Seki Junction.

== List of interchanges and features ==
- IC - interchange, SIC - smart interchange, JCT - junction, SA - service area, PA - parking area

No.	Name	Connections	Dist. from Origin	Notes	Location	
1	Toyota-higashi JCT	Shin-Tōmei Expressway; Isewangan Expressway	0.0		Toyota	Aichi
2	Toyota-Matsudaira IC	National Route 301	3.4		Toyota	Aichi
2-1 PA	Kuragaike PA/SIC	Pref. Route 343 (Norisada Toyota Route)	6.3	Highway Oasis	Toyota	Aichi
3	Toyota-Kanpachi IC	National Route 153 (Toyota-kita Bypass)	9.7		Toyota	Aichi
4	Toyota-Fujioka IC	Pref. Route 13 (Toyota Tajimi Route)	15.4		Toyota	Aichi
5 PA	Seto-Akazu IC/PA	National Route 248; Pref. Route 22 (Seto Kanjō Route); Pref. Route 33 (Seto Shitara Route)	23.2		Seto	Aichi
6	Seto-Shinano IC	National Route 363	26.0		Seto	Aichi
7	Toki-minami Tajimi IC	Pref. Route 382 (Toki-minami Tajimi Inter Route)	36.9		Toki	Gifu
30-1	Toki JCT	Chūō Expressway	39.8		Toki	Gifu
7-1 PA	Gotomaki PA/SIC	Pref. Route 84 (Toki Kani Route)	41.5	Smart Interchange Opened on February 28, 2013	Toki	Gifu
8	Kani-Mitake IC	National Route 21 (Kani-Mitake Bypass)	50.3		Kani	Gifu
8	Kani-Mitake IC	National Route 21 (Kani-Mitake Bypass)	50.3		Mitake	Gifu
9 SA	Minokamo IC/SA	National Route 41 (Minokamo Bypass); Pref. Route 342 (Heisei Kinen Kōen Route)	59.7	Highway Oasis	Minokamo	Gifu
10	Tomika-Seki IC	Pref. Route 58 (Seki Kanayama Route); Pref. Route 343 (Tomika Mino Route)	66.0		Tomika	Gifu
5-1	Mino-Seki JCT	Tōkai-Hokuriku Expressway	73.0			Gifu
5-1	Mino-Seki JCT	Tōkai-Hokuriku Expressway	73.0		Mino	Gifu
11	Seki-Hiromi IC	National Route 418	75.9	Opened on April 18, 2009	Seki	Gifu
11-1 PA	Gifu-Miwa PA/SIC	Pref. Route 59 (Kitano Otogari Route)	79.9	Opened on March 20, 2020	Gifu	Gifu
12	Yamagata IC	National Route 256 (Takatomi Bypass)	84.9	Opened on March 20, 2020	Yamagata	Gifu
13	Gifu IC	Pref. Route 208 (Gifu Sekigahara Route)	91.7	Opened on April 4, 2025	Gifu	Gifu
14	Motosu IC	National Route 157	96.8	Opened on April 4, 2025	Motosu	Gifu
-	Motosu PA		98.4	Opened on August 30, 2025	Motosu	Gifu
15	Ōno-Gōdo IC	Pref. Route 53 (Gifu Sekigahara Route)	103.6	Opened on December 14, 2019	Ōno	Gifu
16	Ōgaki-nishi IC	National Route 21 (Gidai Bypass); Pref. Route 50 (Ōgaki Kanjō Route)	111.1	Opened on September 15, 2012	Ōgaki	Gifu
26-1	Yōrō JCT	Meishin Expressway	117.2	Opened on September 15, 2012	Yōrō	Gifu
17	Yōrō IC	Pref. Route 213 (Yōrō Hirata Route)	120.3	Opened on October 22, 2017	Yōrō	Gifu
<17-1 PA>	Kaizu PA/SIC	-	-	Planned	Kaizu	Gifu
<17-2 PA>	Hokusei PA/SIC	-	-	Planned	Inabe	Mie
18	Inabe IC	Pref. Route 5 (Hokusei Tado Route)	138.4	Opened on March 29, 2025	Inabe	Mie
19	Daian IC	National Route 365 (Inabe Bypass)	144.9	Opened on March 17, 2019	Inabe	Mie
20	Tōin IC	National Route 365 (Inabe Bypass)	151.3	Opened on August 11, 2016	Tōin	Mie
1	Shin-Yokkaichi JCT	Isewangan Expressway; Shinmeishin Expressway	152.7	Opened on August 11, 2016	Yokkaichi	Mie
