= Route 3 (Nagoya Expressway) =

Road in Nagoya, Japan

Nagoya Expressway No.3 Ōdaka Route
- 名古屋高速道路3号大高線
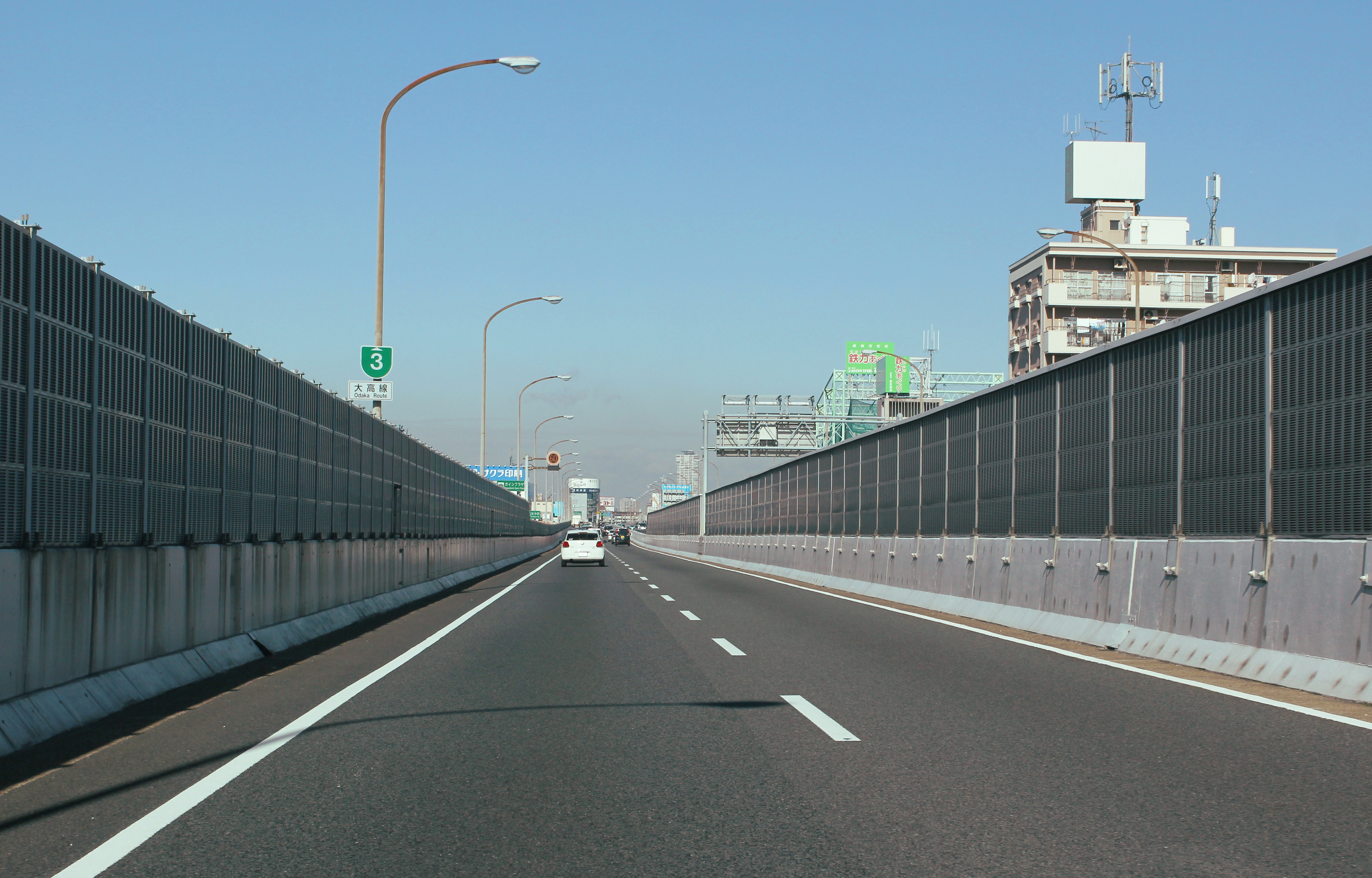

Route information
- Length: 12.1 km (7.5 mi)
- Existed: 1979–present

Major junctions
- From: Tsurumai-minami Junction in Shōwa-ku, Nagoya; Nagoya Expressway Ring Route
- To: Nagoya-minami Junction in Midori-ku, Nagoya; Mei-Nikan Expressway; Isewangan Expressway

Location
- Country: Japan

Highway system
- National highways of Japan; Expressways of Japan

Nagoya Expressway Route 3 Ōdaka Route (名古屋高速道路3号大高線, Nagoya Kōsokudōro Sangō Ōdakasen) is an urban expressway in Nagoya, Japan. It is a part of the Nagoya Expressway network and is owned and operated by Nagoya Expressway Public Corporation.

== Overview ==
The first section was opened to traffic in 1979 (also the first segment of the entire Nagoya Expressway Network) and the entire route was completed in 1985. The expressway is 4 lanes for its entire length.

The route originates from its junction with the Ring Route and extends southward. At its southern terminus it connects to the Isewangan Expressway and Chitahantō Road. Together with the Chitahantō Road, it forms the main road link connecting Chubu International Airport with central Nagoya.

== Interchange list ==
- JCT - junction, TB - toll gate

No.	Name	Connections	Notes	Location (all in Nagoya)
JCT	Tsurumai-minami JCT	Nagoya Expressway Ring Route		Shōwa-ku
301 311	Takatsuji Interchange		301 - South-bound entrance 311 - North-bound exit	Shōwa-ku
302 312	Horida Interchange		302 - South-bound exit 312 - North-bound entrance	Mizuho-ku
303 313	Yobitsuki Interchange	National Route 1	303 - South-bound entrance 313 - North-bound exit	Mizuho-ku
304 314	Kasadera Interchange	National Route 1	304 - South-bound exit 314 - North-bound entrance	Minami-ku
TB	Hoshizaki Toll Gate		North-bound only	Minami-ku
315	Hoshizaki Entrance		North-bound only	Minami-ku
308 318	Ōdaka Interchange	Chitahantō Road; National Route 23 (Meishi Highway)	308 - South-bound exit 318 - North-bound entrance	Midori-ku
(5)	Nagoya-minami JCT	Mei-Nikan Expressway; Isewangan Expressway		Midori-ku
