= Shin-Meishin Expressway =

Expressway in Japan

Shin-Meishin Expressway
- 新名神高速道路

Route information
- Length: 49.7 km (30.9 mi)

Location
- Country: Japan

Highway system
- National highways of Japan; Expressways of Japan

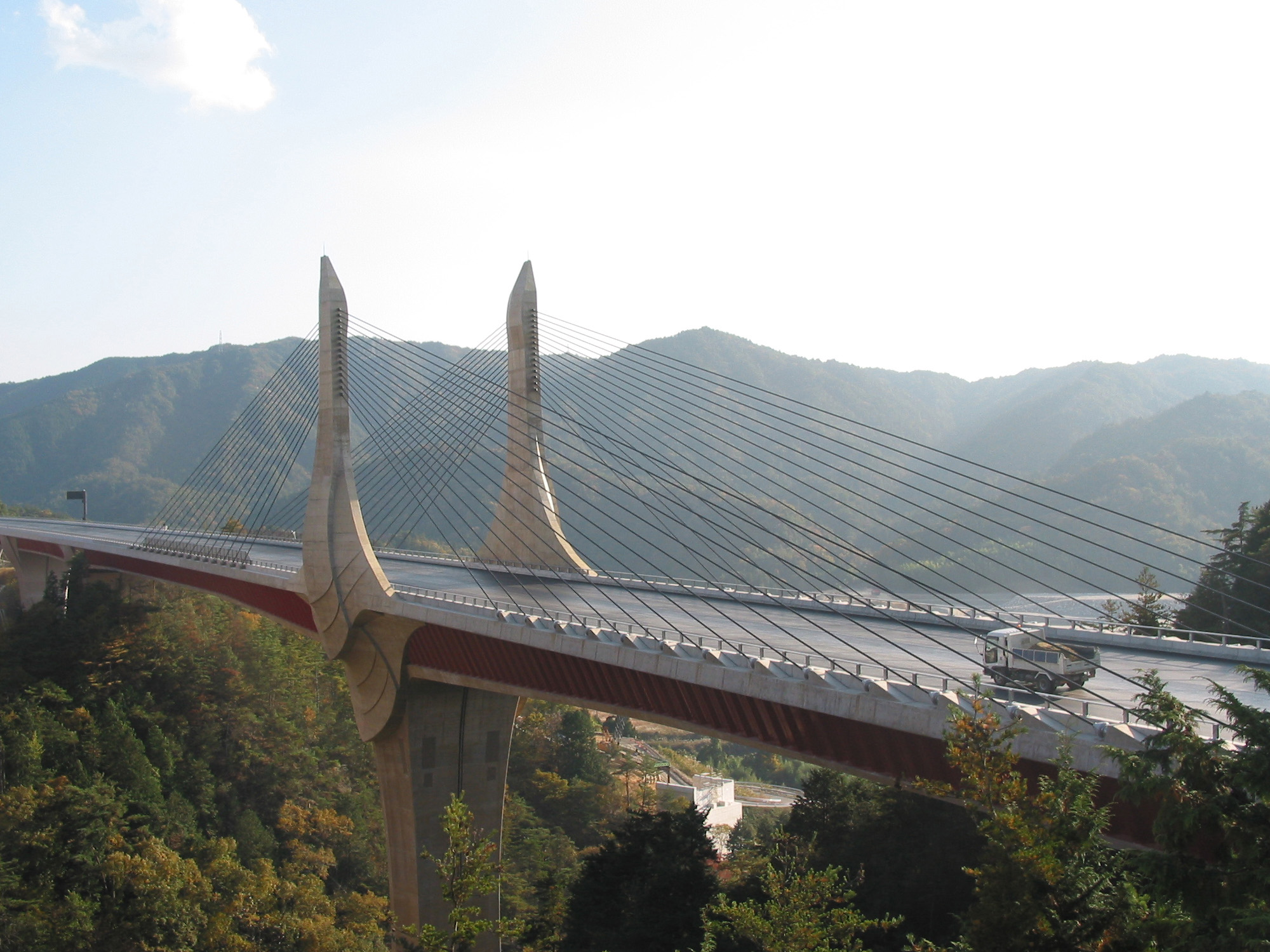
Omi-Odori Bridge on Shin-Meishin Expressway

The Shin-Meishin Expressway (新名神高速道路, Shin Meishin Kōsokudōro) or simply Shin-Meishin for short is an expressway, linking Mie prefecture to Hyōgo Prefecture, which is partially open and partially under construction. The expressways current length as of February 2008 is 49.7 km. It connects to the Isewangan Expressway.

== Interchanges, junctions, service areas and parking areas ==
- IC: interchange
- SIC: smart interchange
- JCT: junction
- SA: service area
- PA: parking area
- BS: bus stop
- TN: tunnel

=== Main route ===
No.	Name	Connections	Dist. from start (km)	Bus stop	Notes	Location	
Isewangan Expressway
(29-1)	Yokkaichi JCT	Higashi-Meihan Expressway	0.0			Yokkaichi	Mie Prefecture
1	Shin-Yokkaichi JCT	Tokai-Kanjo Expressway	4.4			Yokkaichi	Mie Prefecture
2	Komono IC	National Route 477	12.6			Komono	Mie Prefecture
2-1	Suzuka PA/SIC		20.6			Suzuka	Mie Prefecture
3	Kameyama-nishi JCT	Kameyama Connection Route (to Higashi-Meihan Expressway)	27.8			Kameyama	Mie Prefecture
TN	Suzuka TN					Kameyama	Mie Prefecture
–	Tsuchiyama SA/BS		38.3	S		Koka	Shiga Prefecture
4	Koka-Tsuchiyama IC	Shiga Pref. Route 340 (Koka-Tsuchiyama Interchange Route)	41.3			Koka	Shiga Prefecture
5	Konan IC/PA	Shiga Pref. Route 343 (Konan Interchange Route)	51.5			Koka	Shiga Prefecture
6	Shigaraki IC	Shiga Pref. Route 341 (Shigaraki Interchange Route)	58.2			Koka	Shiga Prefecture
7	Otsu JCT	Otsu Connection Route (to Meishin Expressway)	69.8			Otsu	Shiga Prefecture
–	Shin Otsu SA/Shin Otsu SIC	Shiga Pref. Route 782 (Ujitawara Ōishihigashi Route)		–	Opening Year Undecided	Otsu	Shiga Prefecture
–	Ujitawara IC	National Route 307	87.8	–	Opening Year Undecided	Ujitawara	Kyoto Prefecture
–	Shin Joyo SA	–		–	Opening Year Undecided	Joyo	Kyoto Prefecture
9	Joyo JCT/IC	Keinawa Expressway; National Route 24 (Okubo Bypass)	94.9			Joyo	Kyoto Prefecture
10	Yawata-Kyotanabe JCT/IC	Daini Keihan Road; Kyoto Pref. Route 284 (Yawata Interchange Route)	98.4			Yawata	Kyoto Prefecture
Opening Year Undecided
11	Takatsuki JCT/IC	Meishin Expressway; Osaka Pref. Route 79 (Fushimi-Yanagitani-Takatsuki Route)	109.1	–		Takatsuki	Osaka Prefecture
12	Ibaraki-Sendaiji IC/PA	Osaka Pref. Route 1 (Ibaraki-Settsu Route)	119.0	–		Ibaraki	Osaka Prefecture
13	Minō-Todoromi IC	National Route 423; Minō Toll Road	127.1	–		Minoh	Osaka Prefecture
14	Kawanishi IC	Hyogo Pref. Route 721 (Kawanishi Interchange Route)	132.7	–		Kawanishi	Hyogo Prefecture
14-1	Takarazuka-kita SA/SIC	Hyogo Pref. Route 33 (Shiose Takarazuka Route)	141.5	–		Takarazuka	Hyogo Prefecture
(5-1)	Kobe JCT	Chugoku Expressway	149.6	–		Kita-ku, Kobe	Hyogo Prefecture
Sanyo Expressway

=== Kameyama connection route ===
No.	Name	Connections	Dist. from start (km)	Notes	Location
(32-1)	Kameyama JCT	Higashi-Meihan Expressway	0.0		Kameyama, Mie Prefecture
3	Kameyama-nishi JCT	Main Route	5.3	tentative name	Kameyama, Mie Prefecture

=== Otsu connection route ===
No.	Name	Connections	Dist. from start (km)	Notes	Location	
(30-1)	Kusatsu JCT	Meishin Expressway	0.0		Kusatsu	Shiga Prefecture
7-1	Kusatsu-Tanakami IC	Shiga Pref. Route 342 (Kusatsu-Tanakami Interchange Route)	1.2		Kusatsu	Shiga Prefecture
7	Otsu JCT	Main Route	3.6	tentative name	Otsu	Shiga Prefecture

== See also ==
- Central Nippon Expressway Company
- West Nippon Expressway Company
