= Japan National Route 301 =

Road in Japan

National Route 301
- 国道301号

Route information
- Length: 99.2 km (61.6 mi)
- Existed: 1 April 1970–present

Major junctions
- West end: National Route 153 / National Route 248 in Toyota, Aichi
- East end: National Route 1 in Chūō-ku, Hamamatsu

Location
- Country: Japan

Highway system
- National highways of Japan; Expressways of Japan
← National Route 300	→ National Route 302

National Route 301 is a national highway of Japan connecting Chūō-ku, Hamamatsu and Toyota, Aichi in Japan, with a total length of 99.2 km (61.6 mi).
