= Ring Route (Nagoya Expressway) =

Urban expressway in Nagoya, Japan

Route information
- Length: 10.3 km (6.4 mi)
- Existed: 1985–present

Major junctions
- From: Higashi-Kataha Junction in Higashi-ku, Nagoya; Nagoya Expressway Kusunoki Route
- To: Higashi-Kataha Junction in Higashi-ku, Nagoya; Nagoya Expressway Kusunoki Route

Location
- Country: Japan

Highway system
- National highways of Japan; Expressways of Japan

The Nagoya Expressway Ring Route (名古屋高速道路都心環状線, Nagoya Kōsokudōro Toshinkanjōsen) is an urban expressway in Nagoya, Japan. It is a part of the Nagoya Expressway network and is owned and operated by Nagoya Expressway Public Corporation.

== Overview ==
The Ring Route forms a rectangular loop around downtown Nagoya. It is one-way only and flows clockwise with 2 to 4 lanes of traffic. Routes 1 through 6 of the Nagoya Expressway network extend radially from the Ring Route (Route 2 bisects it). The Ring Route also serves as the origin point for these expressways.

The first section of the route was opened to traffic in 1985 and the route was completed in 1995. The future Sannō Junction will link the Ring Route to Route 4 which is under construction.

== In Gaming ==
The Nagoya Expressway Ring Route is used in Wangan Midnight Maximum Tune 6 as the Nagoya Area map, or the Nagoya Speed Ring. However, when playing on this map you race for 14.9 km, going around the Ring Route more than one time but less than twice. Around the Marunouchi Exit, there are orange lights on the border of the roadway that illuminate at night, just like the actual expressway.

== Interchange list ==
- JCT - junction

No.	Name	Connections	Notes	Location (all in Nagoya)
JCT	Higashi-Kataha JCT	Nagoya Expressway Kusunoki Route		Higashi-ku
C01	Tōshinchō Exit			Higashi-ku
C02	Tōshinchō Entrance			Higashi-ku
JCT	Marutamachi JCT	Nagoya Expressway Higashiyama Route	Marutamachi JCT ←→ Takabari JCT access only	Naka-ku
JCT	Tsurumai-minami JCT	Nagoya Expressway Ōdaka Route		Shōwa-ku
C03	Higashibetsuin Exit			Naka-ku
C04	Higashibetsuin Entrance			Naka-ku
JCT	Sannō JCT	Nagoya Expressway Tōkai Route	Under construction	Nakagawa-ku
JCT	Shinsuzaki JCT	Nagoya Expressway Manba Route	Shinsuzaki JCT ←→ Nagoya-nishi JCT access only	Nakamura-ku
C05	Nishikibashi Exit			Naka-ku
C06	Meieki Entrance		Meieki is the area around Nagoya Station.	Nakamura-ku
JCT	Meidōchō JCT	Nagoya Expressway Kiyosu Route		Nishi-ku
C07	Marunouchi Exit	National Route 22	On the sides of the roadway, there are orange lights that illuminate when it is dark	Naka-ku
C08	Marunouchi Entrance	National Route 22		Naka-ku
JCT	Higashi-Kataha JCT	Nagoya Expressway Kusunoki Route		Higashi-ku
