= Japan National Route 302 =

National highway in Japan

National Route 302
- 国道302号

Route information
- Length: 54.0 km (33.6 mi)
- Existed: 1970–present

Major junctions
- Loop around Nagoya
- National Route 1; National Route 22; National Route 41; National Route 19; National Route 363; National Route 153; National Route 23; National Route 247

Location
- Country: Japan

Highway system
- National highways of Japan; Expressways of Japan
← National Route 301	→ National Route 303

National Route 302 is a national highway of Japan connecting Nakagawa-ku, Nagoya and Nakagawa-ku, Nagoya in Japan, with a total length of 54 km (33.55 mi). Route 302 serves as Nagoya's inner loop and runs concurrent with much of the Mei-Nikan Expressway.
