= Nagoya Expressway =

Road network in Nagoya, Japan

The Nagoya Expressway (名古屋高速道路, Nagoya Kōsokudōro) is a network of urban expressways in Japan serving the greater Nagoya area. It is owned and managed by Nagoya Expressway Public Corporation.

== Overview ==
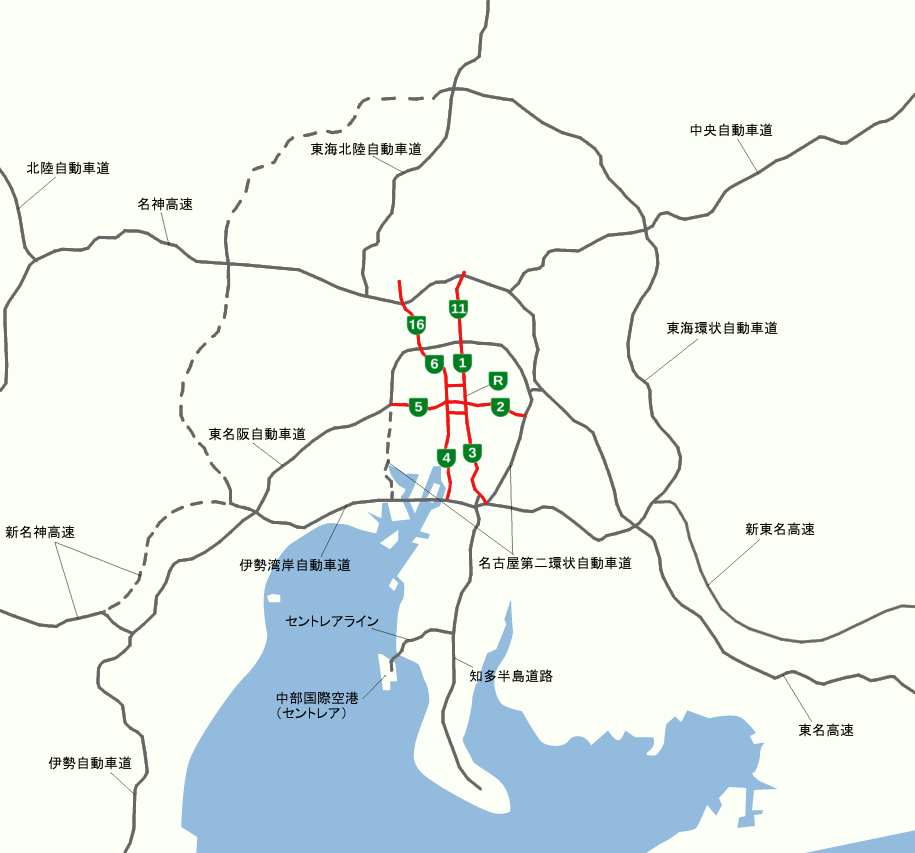
Nagoya Expressway map

The first section of the Nagoya Expressway network opened to traffic in 1979. As of 2008, 69.2 kilometres (43.0 mi) of the network has been completed.

The Ring Route at the center of Nagoya is one-way, flowing clockwise. Routes 1 through 6 extend radially from the Ring Route, with Route 2 bisecting the Ring Route. Routes 11 and 16 are extensions of Routes 1 and 6 respectively; a separate toll is required for these routes.

Nagoya Expressway faces competition from the expressways operated by Central Nippon Expressway Company in the greater Nagoya area. Discount policies on these expressways are much more significant than those on the Nagoya Expressway network, which leads to reduced revenue for the Nagoya Expressway and reduced efficiency of the entire road network in the region.

== Routes ==
The company operates the following 9 lines.

- Ring Route
- Route 1（Higashi-Kataha Junction〈Higashi-ku〉 - Kusunoki Junction〈Kita-ku〉）
- Route 2（Shin-Suzaki Junction〈Nakamura-ku〉 - Takabari Junction〈Meitō-ku〉）
- Route 3（Tsurumai-Minami Junction〈Shōwa-ku〉 - Nagoya-Minami Junction〈Midori-ku〉）
- Route 4 (Sannou Junction〈Nakagawa-ku〉 - Tōkai Junction〈Tōkai〉）
- Route 5（Shin-Suzaki Junction〈Nakamura-ku〉 - Nagoya-Nishi Junction〈Nakagawa-ku〉）
- Route 6（Meidōchō Junction〈Nishi-ku〉 - Kiyosu Junction〈Kiyosu〉）
- Route 11（Kusunoki Junction〈Kita-ku〉 - Komaki Interchange〈Komaki〉）
- Route 16（Kiyosu Junction〈Kiyosu〉 - Ichinomiya-Naka Interchange〈Ichinomiya〉）
