= Japan National Route 247 =

National highway in Japan

National Route 247
- 国道247号
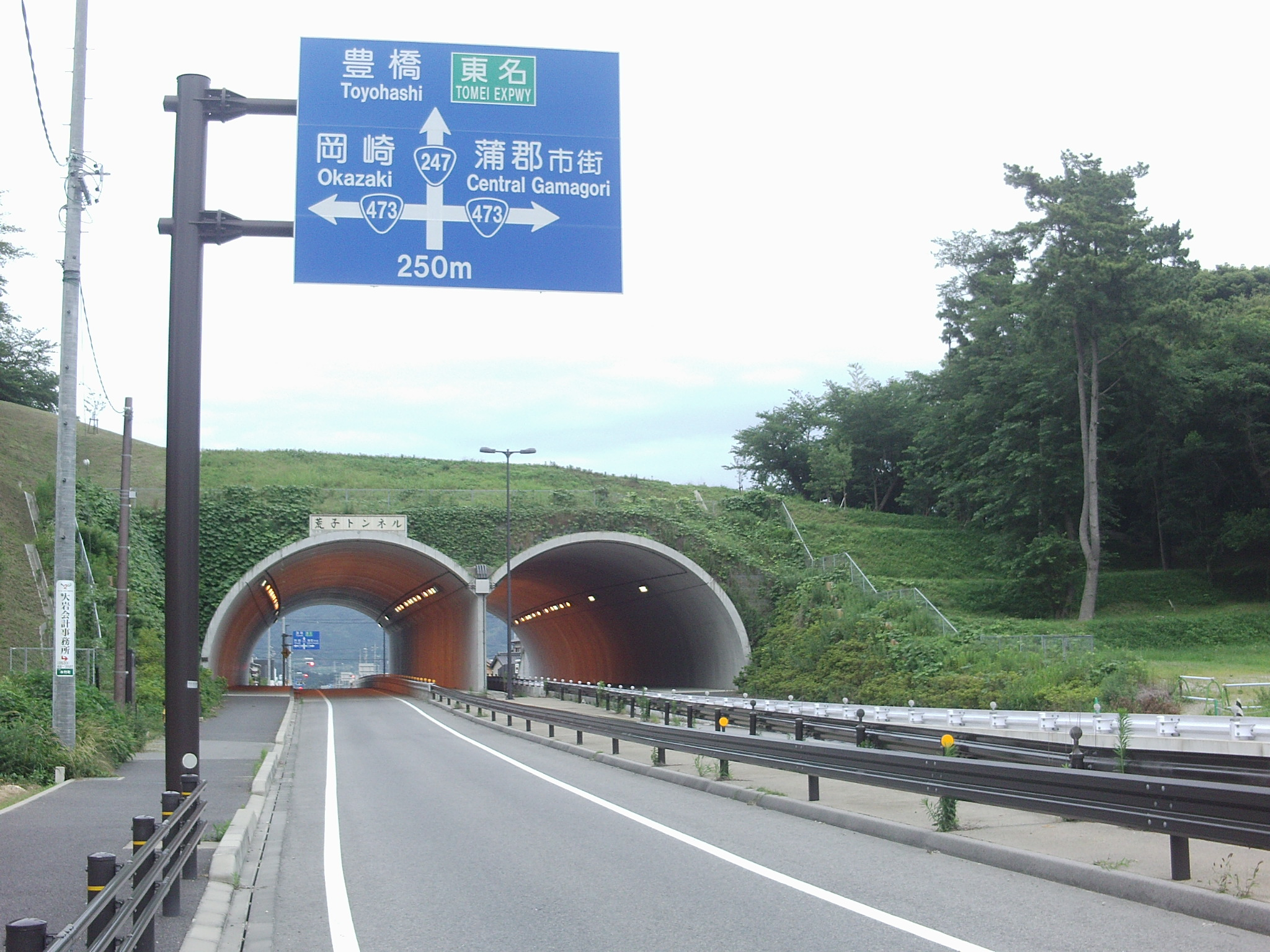

Route information
- Length: 150.8 km (93.7 mi)
- Existed: 10 July 1956–present

Major junctions
- North end: National Route 1 / National Route 19 in Atsuta-ku, Nagoya
- South end: National Route 1 / National Route 151 in Toyohashi

Location
- Country: Japan

Highway system
- National highways of Japan; Expressways of Japan
← National Route 246	→ National Route 248

National Route 247 is a national highway of Japan connecting Atsuta-ku, Nagoya and Toyohashi in Japan, with a total length of 150.8 km (93.7 mi).
