= Higashi-Meihan Expressway =

Expressway in Aichi and Mie Prefectures, Japan

Higashi-Meihan Expressway
- 東名阪自動車道

Route information
- Length: 55.1 km (34.2 mi)
- Existed: 1970–present

Major junctions
- From: Nagoya-nishi Junction in Nagoya; Nagoya Expressway Mamba Route; Mei-Nikan Expressway
- To: Ise-Seki Interchange in Tsu, Mie; Ise Expressway

Location
- Country: Japan
- Major cities: Ama, Aisai, Yatomi, Kuwana, Yokkaichi, Suzuka, Kameyama

Highway system
- National highways of Japan; Expressways of Japan

The Higashi-Meihan Expressway (東名阪自動車道, Higashimeihan Jidōshadō) is a four lane national expressway in the Tōkai region of Japan. It is owned and operated by Central Nippon Expressway Company.

== Naming ==
Meihan is a kanji acronym of two characters. The first character represents Nagoya (名古屋) and the second character represents Osaka (大阪). Higashi (東) means east; together with the Meihan Expressway and Nishi-Meihan Expressway, it forms a corridor linking the greater Nagoya and Osaka areas.

Officially, the route is designated as the Kinki Expressway Nagoya Osaka Route, however this designation does not appear on any signage. In some areas, signs on the route are written in Japanese as 東名阪道 or ひがし名阪道; this is to prevent confusion with the Tōmei Expressway which looks similar when written in Japanese.

== Route description ==
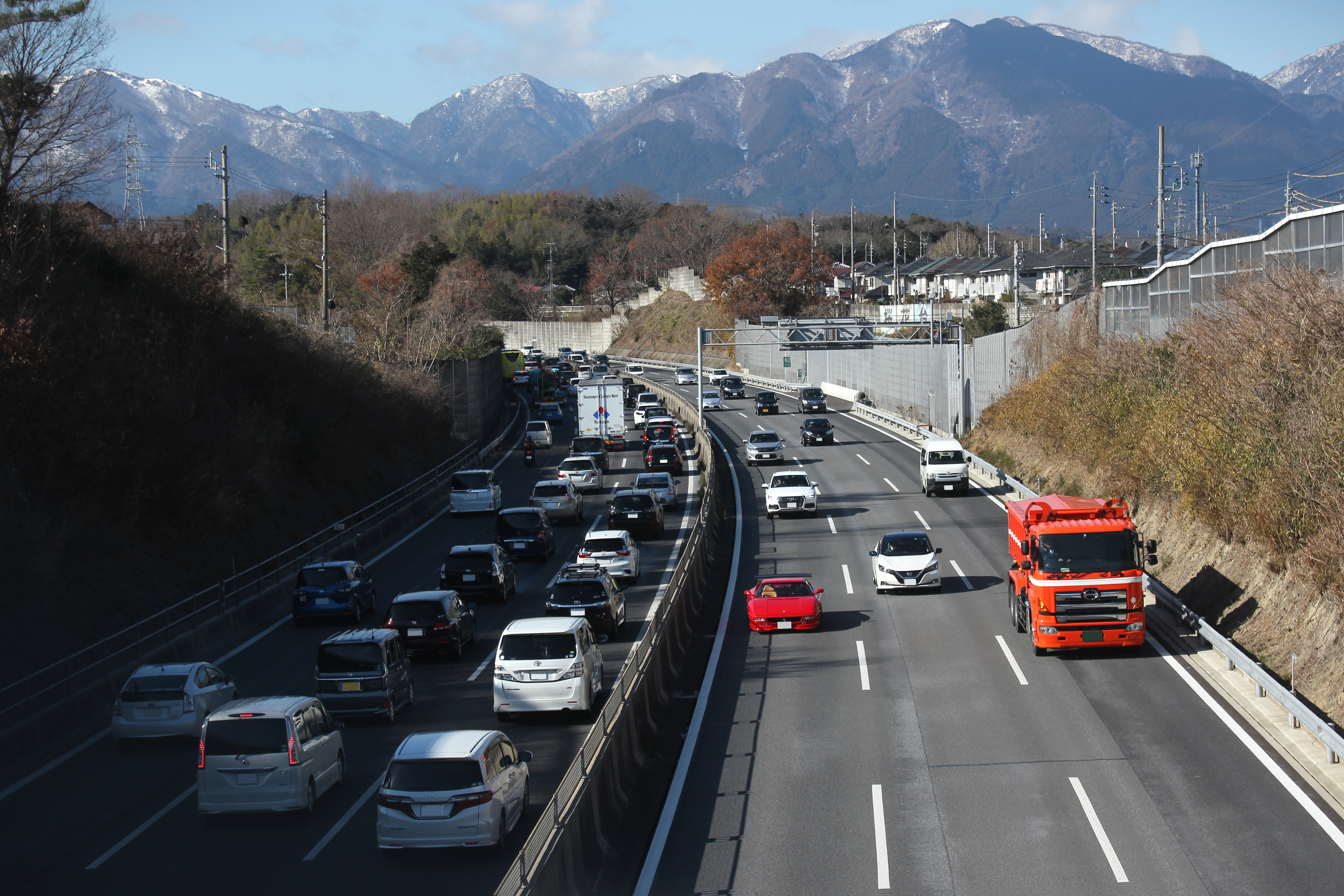
Higashi-Meihan Expressway in Yokkaichi.

The expressway runs from Nagoya-nishi Junction in Nakagawa-ku, Nagoya to Ise-Seki Interchange in Tsu. The expressway is built to the same standards as most other national expressways, with tolls being charged according to the distance traveled. It has at least two lanes in each direction, with three in some sections.

== History ==
The first section of what would later become the Higashi-Meihan Expressway opened to traffic in 1970.

In March 2023, a "Higashi-Meihan car crash" occurred near the Kameyama Junction in Kameyama City, Mie Prefecture, killing three people and seriously injuring five others.

== List of interchanges and features ==
The exit numbers continue from the sequence of the Mei-Nikan Expressway, starting at 23.

- IC - interchange, SIC - smart interchange, JCT - junction, PA - parking area, SA - service area, TB - toll gate, TN - tunnel

| No. | Name | Connections | Dist. from Nagoya-nishi JCT | Bus Stop | Notes | Location | |
|---|---|---|---|---|---|---|---|
Through to Nagoya Expressway Manba Route
| 23 | Nagoya-nishi JCT | Mei-Nikan Expressway | 0.0 | | | Nakagawa-ku, Nagoya | Aichi Prefecture |
| 24 | Nagoya-nishi IC | Pref. Route 40 (Nagoya Kanie Yatomi Route) | 0.8 | | | Nakagawa-ku, Nagoya | Aichi Prefecture |
| TB | Nagoya-nishi Toll Gate | | | | | Ama | Aichi Prefecture |
| 25 | Kanie IC | Pref. Route 65 (Ichinomiya Kanie Route) | 3.6 | | | Kanie | Aichi Prefecture |
| - | Saya JCT | Ichinomiya-Nishiko Road (planned) | | | | Aisai | Aichi Prefecture |
| 26 | Yatomi IC | National Route 155 (Yatomi Bypass) | 9.0 | | | Yatomi | Aichi Prefecture |
| 27 | Nagashima IC | Pref. Route 7 (Suigō Kōen Route); Pref. Route 117 (Tado Nagashima Route); Pref. Route 168 (Tatsuta Nagashima Inter Route) | 12.7 | | | Kuwana | Mie |
| 28 | Kuwana-higashi IC | National Route 258 | 16.0 | | | Kuwana | Mie |
| PA | Ōyamada PA | | 17.0 | | | Kuwana | Mie |
| 29 | Kuwana IC | Pref. Route 63 (Hoshigawa Nishibessho Route) | 19.9 | | | Kuwana | Mie |
| 29-1 | Yokkaichi JCT | Isewangan Expressway / Shin-Meishin Expressway | 23.3 | | | Yokkaichi | Mie |
| BS | Chiyoda Bus Stop | | | X | Closed | Yokkaichi | Mie |
| 30 | Yokkaichi-higashi IC | Pref. Route 64 (Kamiebi Mochibuku Route) | 25.8 | | | Yokkaichi | Mie |
| SA | Gozaisho SA | | 27.2 | | | Yokkaichi | Mie |
| BS | Agata Bus Stop | | | X | Closed | Yokkaichi | Mie |
| 31 | Yokkaichi IC | National Route 477 | 32.2 | | | Yokkaichi | Mie |
| BS | Nishiyama Bus Stop | | | X | Closed | Yokkaichi | Mie |
| 32 | Suzuka IC | Pref. Route 27 (Kanbe Nagasawa Route) | 41.8 | | | Suzuka | Mie |
| TB | Suzuka Toll Gate | | | | Closed March 13, 2005 | Suzuka | Mie |
| 32-1 | Kameyama JCT | Shin-Meishin Expressway | 46.9 | | | Kameyama | Mie |
| BS | Sumiyama Bus Stop | | | X | Closed | Kameyama | Mie |
| PA | Kameyama PA/ SIC | | 52.1 | | Highway Oasis | Kameyama | Mie |
| 33 | Kameyama IC | National Route 1 (Seki Bypass) / National Route 25 / Meihan Expressway | 53.2 | | Ise-Seki-bound exit, Nagoya-bound entrance only | Kameyama | Mie |
| 34 | Ise-Seki IC | National Route 25 / Meihan Expressway | 55.1 | | Ise-Seki IC ←→ Higashi-Meihan: No Access | Tsu | Mie |
Through to Ise Expressway
