= Japan National Route 41 =

National highway in Japan

National Route 41
- 国道41号
- Yon-ichi, Shippin

Route information
- Length: 252.1 km (156.6 mi)
- Existed: 1 April 1959–present

Major junctions
- South end: National Route 19 in Higashi-ku, Nagoya
- North end: National Route 8 in Toyama

Location
- Country: Japan

Highway system
- National highways of Japan; Expressways of Japan
← National Route 40	→ National Route 42

National Route 41 (国道41号, Kokudō Yonjūichi-gō) is a national highway connecting Nagoya, Aichi Prefecture, and Toyama, Toyama Prefecture, Japan. The bulk of the road runs through Gifu Prefecture. The route is also referred to as Yon-ichi and Shippin, based on the Japanese readings for the route numbering.

The road generally follows the route of JR Central's Takayama Main Line, except for a few locations around the cities of Takayama and Hida. The northern part of the route is generally used for sightseeing and the southern part is for industry. As a result, the northern areas are generally crowded only on weekends and holidays, whereas the southern areas, especially around Nagoya, have high traffic volume every day.

== Route data ==
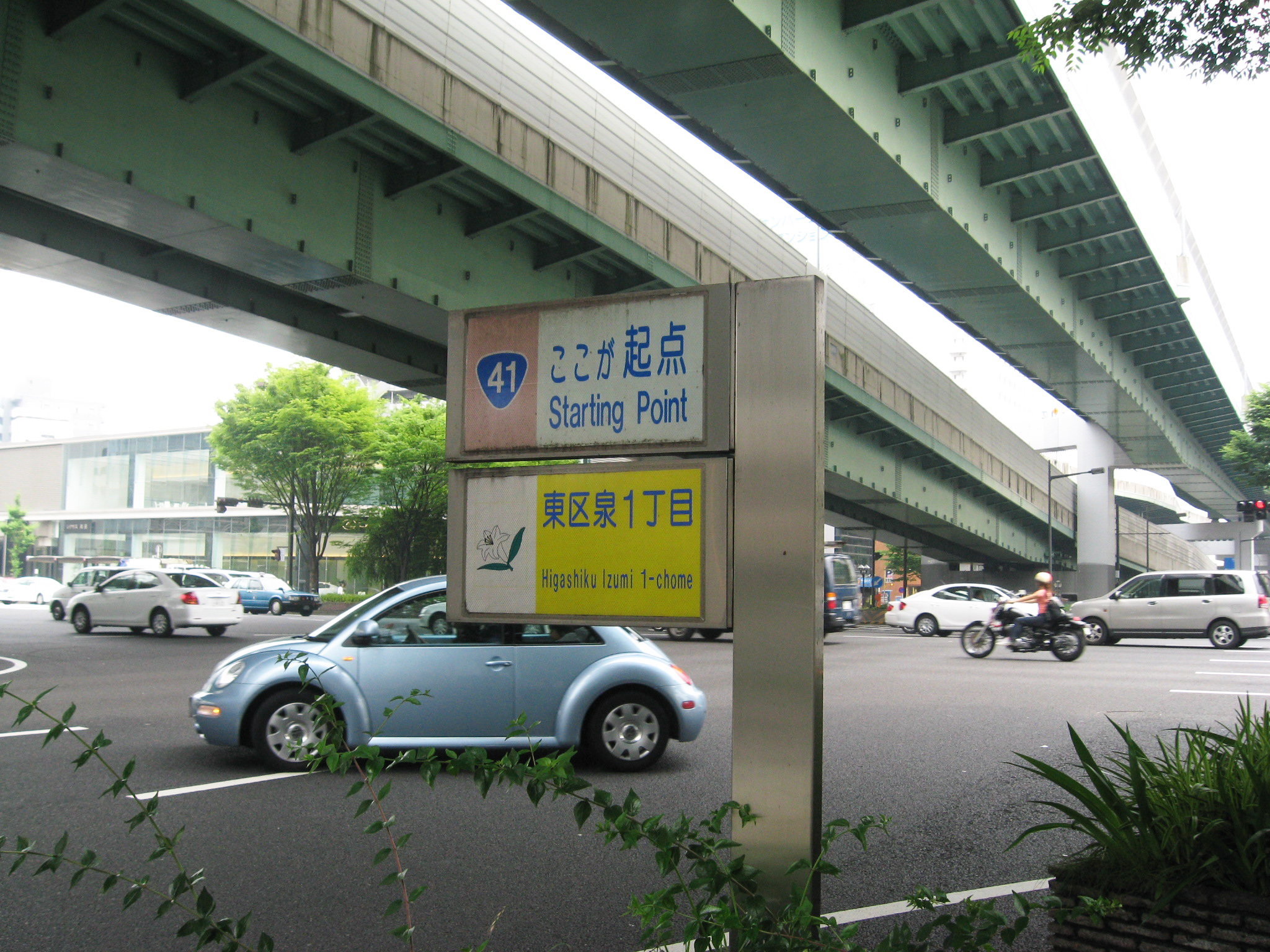
Starting Point

- Length: 252.1 km (156.6 mi)
- Origin: Higashi-ku, Nagoya, Aichi Prefecture (originates at junction with Route 19)
- Terminus: Toyama, Toyama Prefecture (ends at junction with Route 8)
- Major cities: Minokamo, Gero, Takayama

== History ==
Route 41 was originally designated on 18 May 1953 as National Route 155, and this was redesignated as Route 41 when the route was promoted to a Class 1 highway.

== Overlapping sections ==
- In Minokamo, from Ota-honmachi-4 intersection to Shin-Ota-bashi intersection: Route 21
- In Minokamo, from Shimamachi intersection to Mikadocho intersection: Route 248

== Municipalities passed through ==
- Aichi Prefecture

Nagoya, Toyoyama, Komaki, Ōguchi, Fusō, Inuyama

- Gifu Prefecture

Kani, Minokamo, Kawabe, Hichisō, Yaotsu, Shirakawa, Gero, Takayama, Hida

- Toyama Prefecture

Toyama

== Intersects with ==
- Aichi Prefecture
  - Route 19 (at the origin)
  - Route 302 (Nagoya's Higashi-ku)
  - Route 155 (Komaki)
- Gifu Prefecture
  - Route 21 and 248 (Minokamo)
  - Route 418 (Kawabe)
  - Route 256 (Kawabe, Gero)
  - Route 257 (Gero)
  - Route 158 (Takayama)
  - Route 472 (Takayama, Hida)
  - Route 471 (Hida)
- Toyama Prefecture
  - Route 359 and 360 (Toyama)
  - Route 8 (at the terminus)
