= Nakagawa-ku =

Ward of Nagoya in Chūbu, Japan

Nakagawa 中川区
- Ward
- Nakagawa Ward
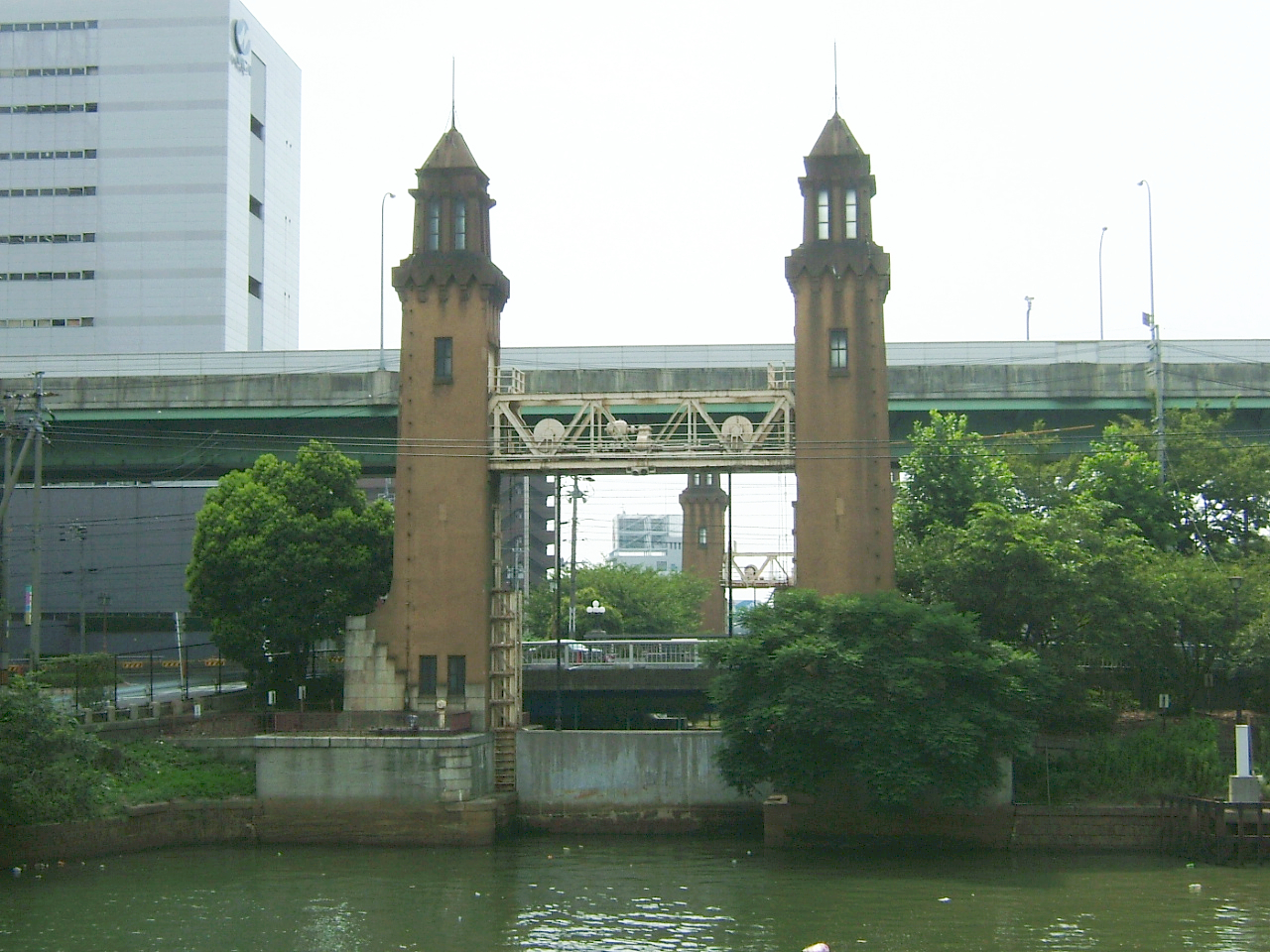
- Matsushige Rock Gate

- Flag Seal

- Location of Nakagawa in Aichi Prefecture

- Location in Japan
- Coordinates: 35°8′30″N 136°51′18″E
- Country: Japan
- Region: Chūbu region Tōkai region
- Prefecture: Aichi Prefecture

Area
  - Total: 32.02 km^{2} (12.36 sq mi)

Population (October 1, 2019)
  - Total: 220,782
  - Density: 6,895/km^{2} (17,860/sq mi)
- Time zone: UTC+09:00 (JST)
- City hall address: 愛知県名古屋市中川区高畑一丁目223; 454-8501
- Website: www.city.nagoya.jp/nakagawa/ (in Japanese)
- Symbols
- Flower: Ornamental cabbage
- Tree: Japanese Black Pine

Nakagawa (中川区, Nakagawa-ku) is one of the 16 wards of the city of Nagoya in Aichi Prefecture, Japan. As of 1 October 2019, the ward has an estimated population of 220,782 and a population density of 6,895 persons per km^{2}. The total area is 32.02 km^{2}.
