= Transport in Japan =

Transportation networks and infrastructure in Japan

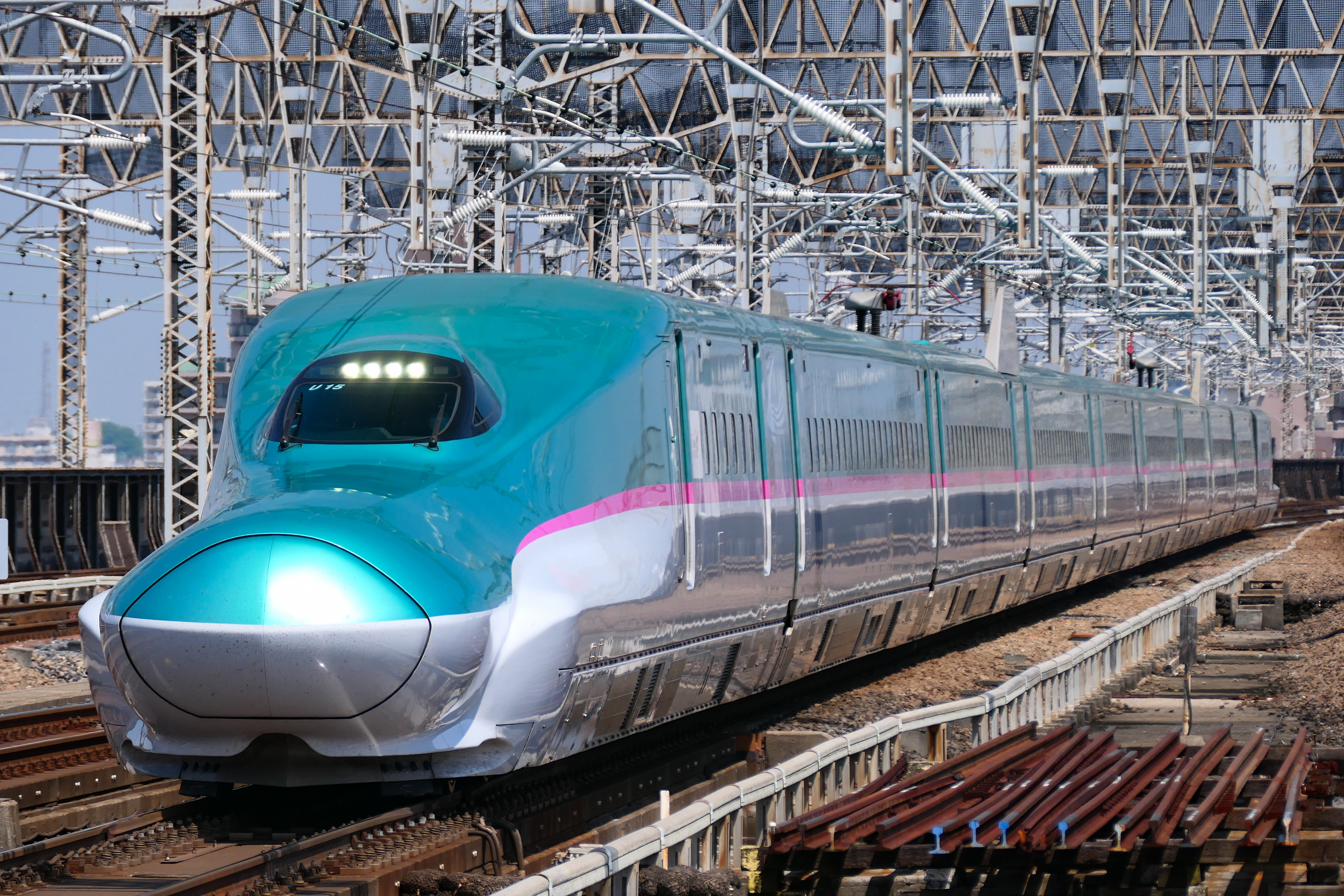
A JR East E5 series shinkansen train

Transport in Japan is modern and highly developed. Japan's transport sector stands out for its energy efficiency: it uses less energy per person compared to other countries, thanks to a high share of rail transport and low overall travel distances. Transport in Japan is also very expensive in international comparison, reflecting high tolls and taxes, particularly on automobile transport. Japan's spending on roads has been large. The 1,200,000 kilometres (750,000 mi) of paved road are the main means of transport. Traffic in Japan drives on the left. A single network of high-speed, divided, limited-access toll roads connects major cities, which are operated by toll-collecting enterprises.

Dozens of Japanese railway companies compete in regional and local passenger transport markets; for instance, seven JR Group companies, Kintetsu Railway, Seibu Railway, and Keio Corporation. Often, strategies of these enterprises contain real estate or department stores next to stations. Some 250 high-speed Shinkansen trains connect major cities. All trains are known for punctuality.

There are 176 airports, and the largest domestic airport, Haneda Airport, was by passenger traffic the third-busiest in Asia and the fourth-busiest in the world in 2018, but not in the top ten in 2022. The largest international gateways are Narita International Airport (Tokyo area), Kansai International Airport (Osaka/Kobe/Kyoto area), and Chūbu Centrair International Airport (Nagoya area). The largest ports include Nagoya Port.

== Railway ==
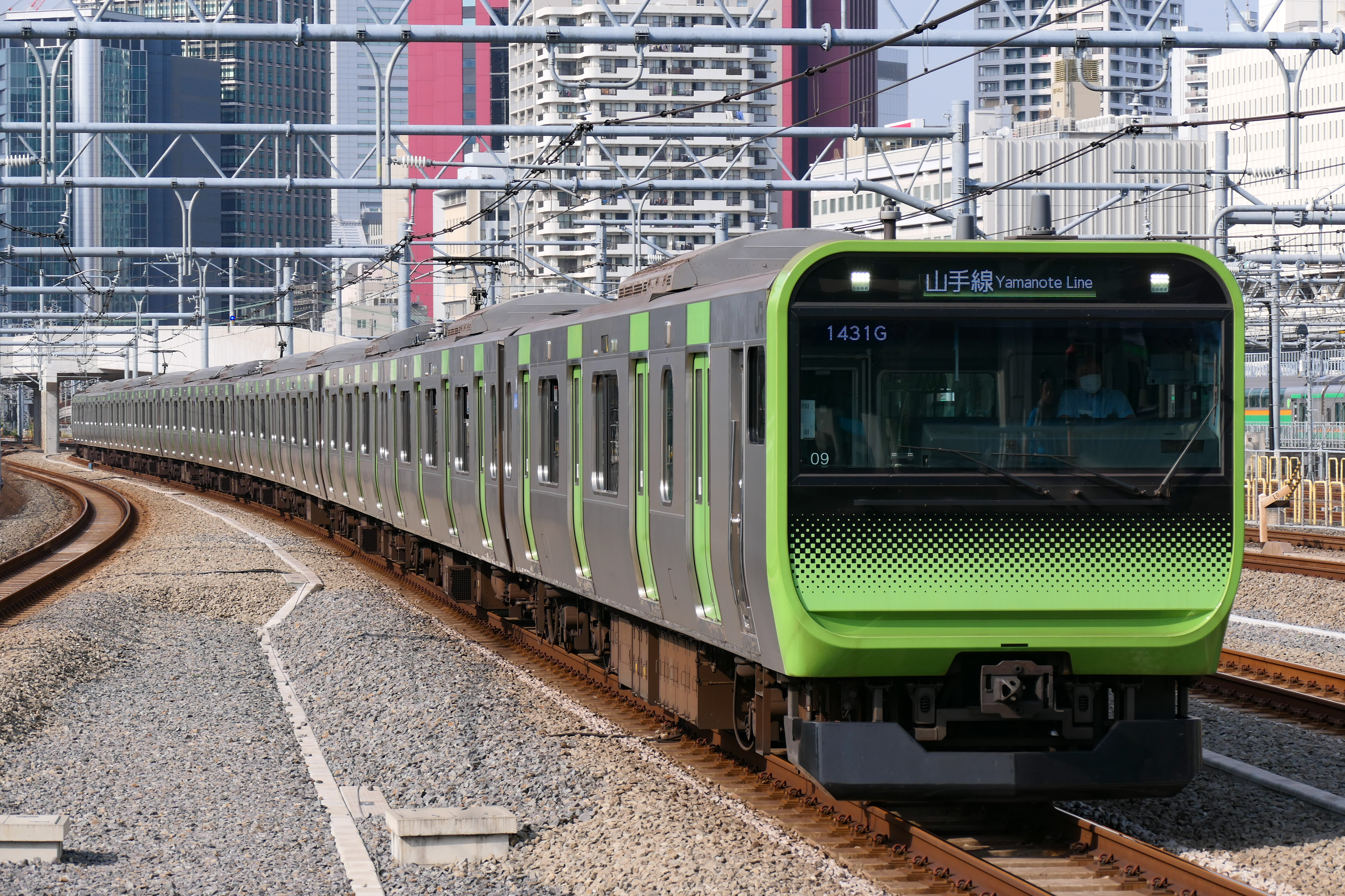
Yamanote Line, Tokyo

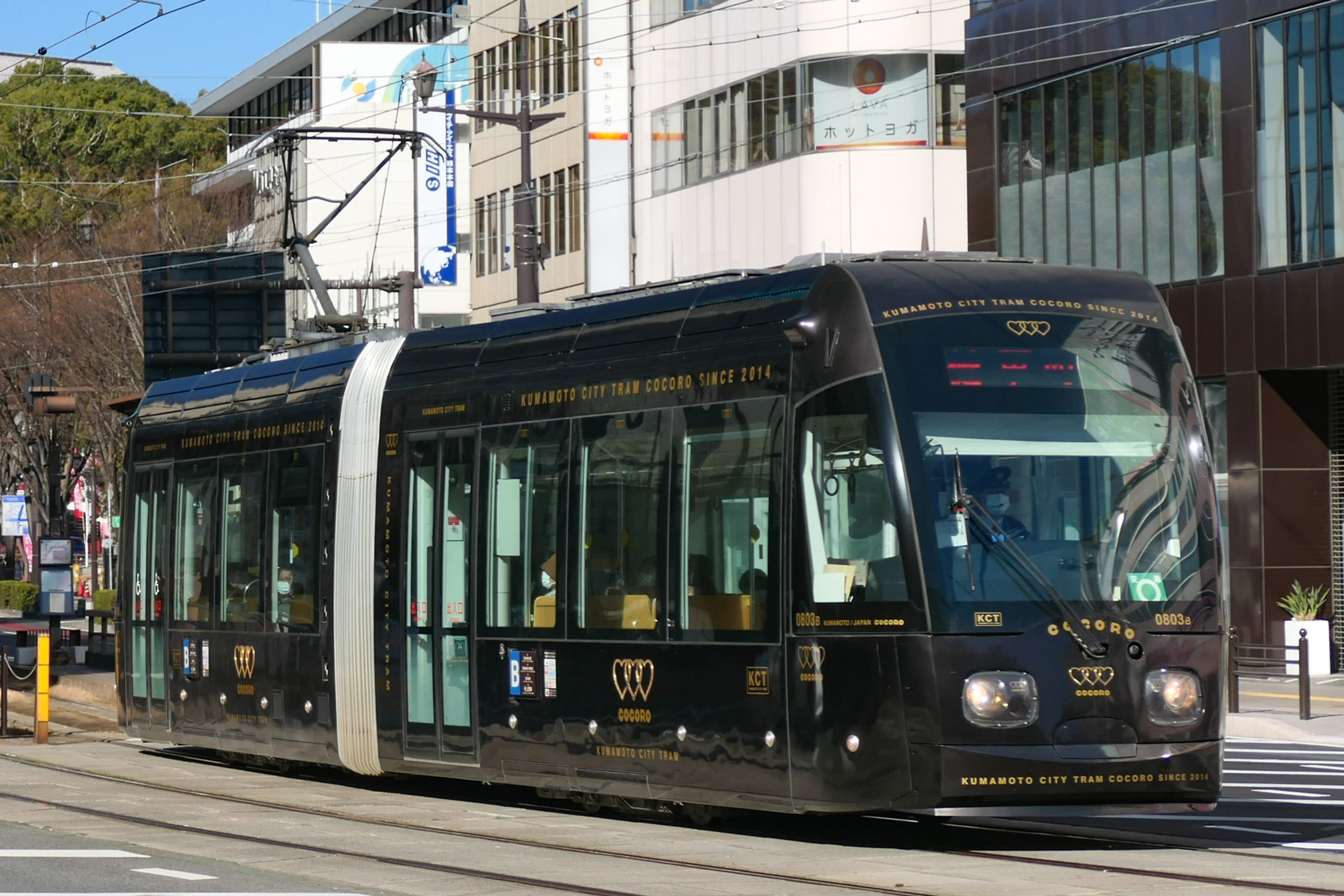
A tram in Kumamoto

In Japan, railways are a major means of passenger transport, especially for mass and high-speed transport between major cities and for commuter transport in metropolitan areas. Seven Japan Railways Group companies, state-owned until 1987, cover most parts of Japan. There also are railway services operated by private rail companies, regional governments, and companies funded by both regional governments and private companies.

Total railways of 27,182 km (16,890 mi) include several track gauges, the most common of which is 1,067 mm (3 ft 6 in) narrow gauge, with 22,301 km (13,857 mi) of track of which 15,222 km (9,459 mi) is electrified.

Hiroshima, Saitama, Fukuoka, Kobe, Kyoto, Nagoya, Osaka, Sapporo, Sendai, Tokyo, and Yokohama have subway systems.

Most Japanese people traveled on foot until the later part of the 19th century. The first railway was built between Tokyo's Shimbashi Station and Yokohama's former Yokohama Station (now Sakuragichō Station) in 1872. Many more railways developed soon afterward.

Japan has one of the world’s most developed transport systems, with railways acting as the core of passenger transport. Car ownership is high, but road development has not kept pace with demand. This can be explained partly by the dense urban areas and limitation of land, making large-scale road expansion difficult.

=== Shinkansen (bullet train) ===
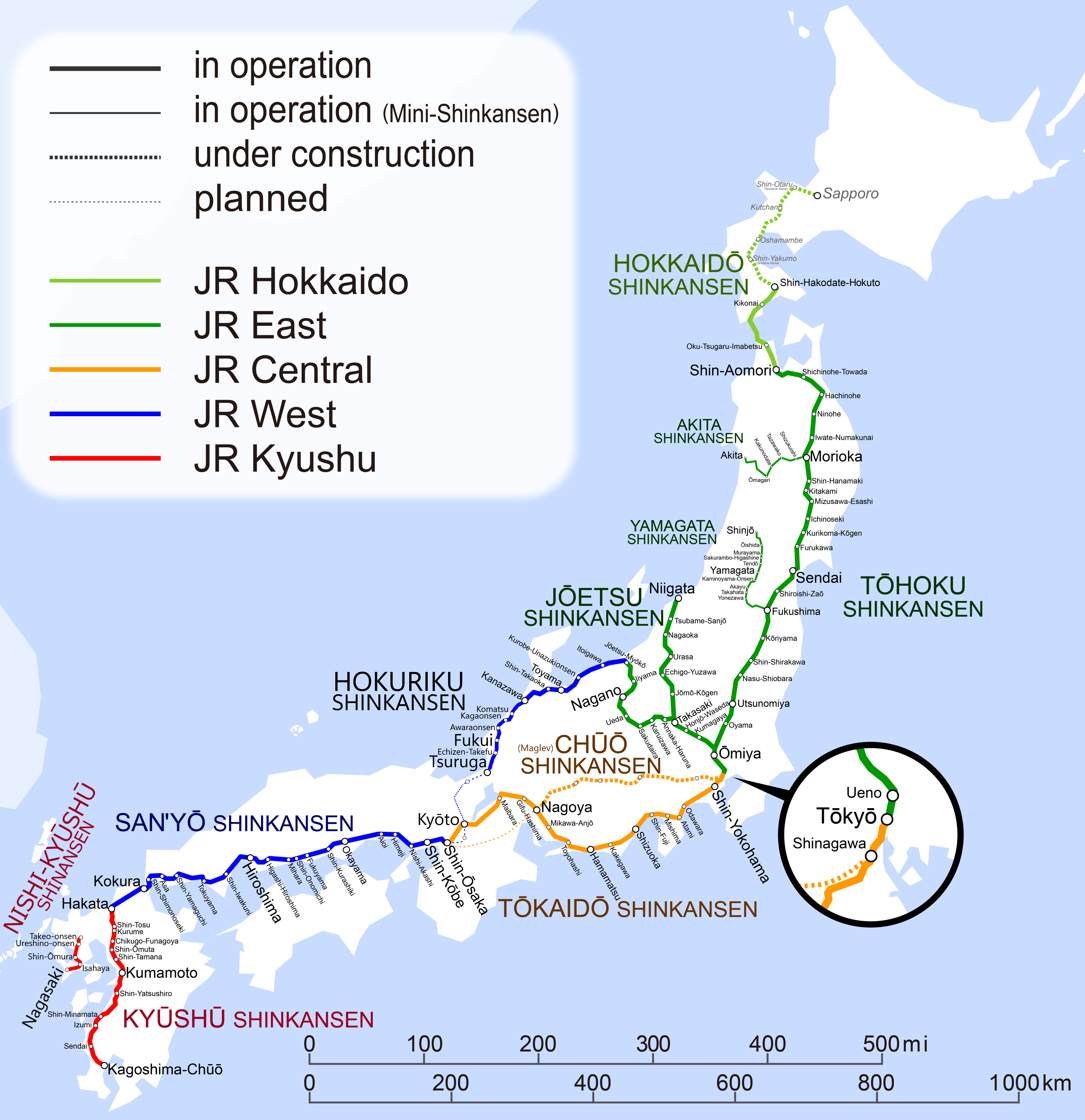
Map of Shinkansen lines except Hakata-Minami Line and Gala-Yuzawa Line

The Shinkansen, or "bullet trains", as they are known colloquially, are the high-speed rail trains that run across Japan. The 2,387 km (1,485 mi) of 8 Shinkansen lines run on completely separate lines from their commuting train counterparts, with a few exceptions. Shinkansen takes up a large portion of the long-distance travel in Japan, with the whole system carrying over 10 billion passengers in its lifetime. 1,114,000 journeys are made daily, with the fastest train being the JR East E5 and E6 series trains, which operate at a maximum speed of 320 km/h (200 mph). Shinkansen trains are known to be very safe, with no accident-related deaths or injuries from passengers in their 50-plus year history. Shinkansen trains are also known to be very punctual, following suit with all other Japanese transport; in 2003, the average delay per train on the Tokaido Shinkansen was a mere 6 seconds. Japan has been trying to sell its Shinkansen technology overseas, and has struck deals to help build systems in India, Thailand, and the United States.

The first Shinkansen line opened between Tokyo and Osaka in 1964, and trains can now make the journey in 2 hours and 25 minutes. Additional Shinkansen lines connect Tokyo to Aomori, Niigata, Kanazawa, and Hakodate and Osaka to Fukuoka and Kagoshima, with new lines under construction to Tsuruga and Sapporo. A separate line heads out to Nagasaki, albeit through a separate relay service.

Japan has been developing maglev technology trains, and broke the world maglev speed record in April 2015 with a train traveling at the speed of 603 km/h (375 mph). The Chūō Shinkansen, a commercial maglev service, is currently under construction from Tokyo to Nagoya and Osaka, and when completed in 2045 will cover the distance in 67 minutes, half the time of the current Shinkansen.

== Road ==
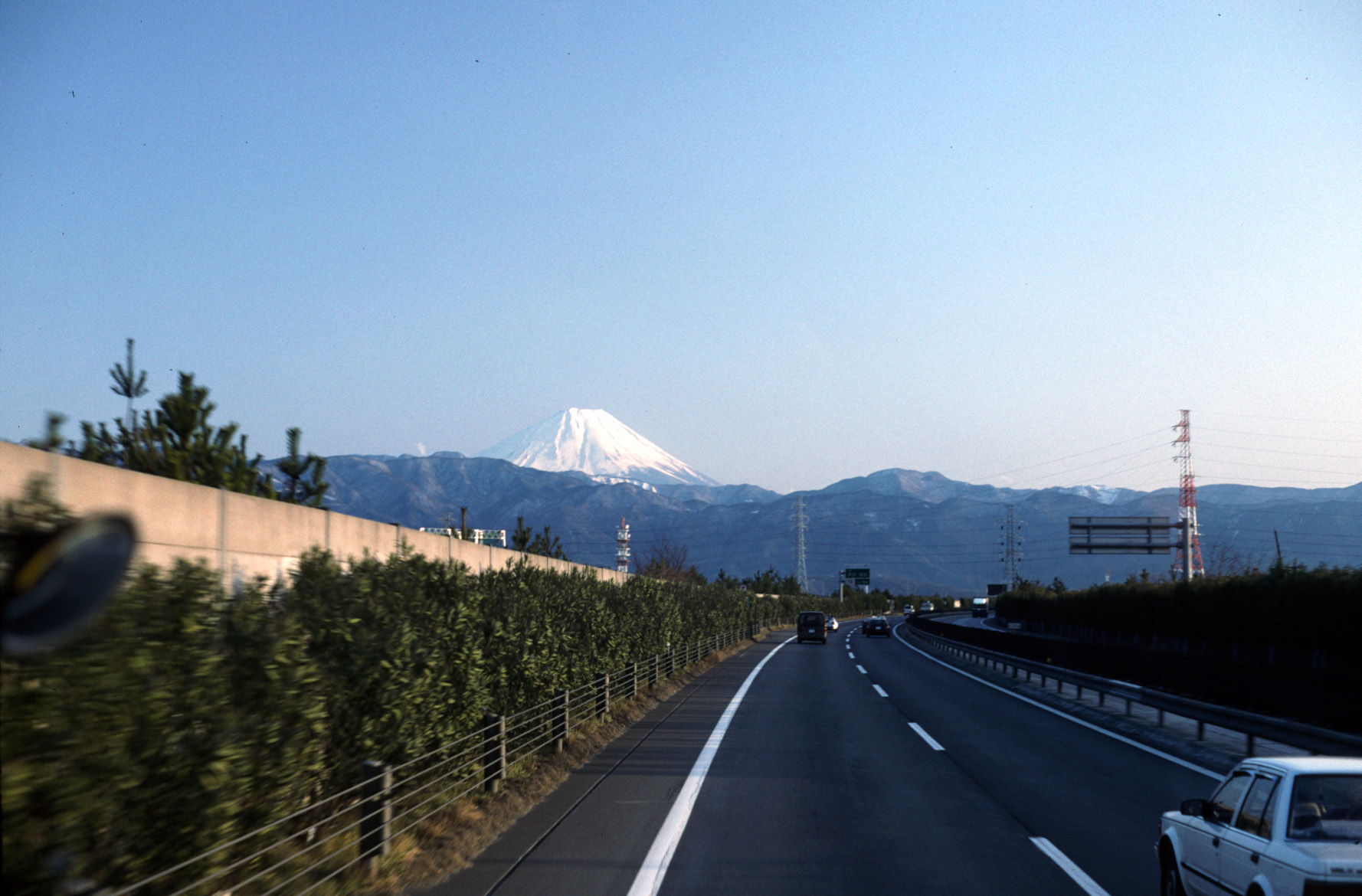
Mount Fuji as seen from the Chuo Expressway

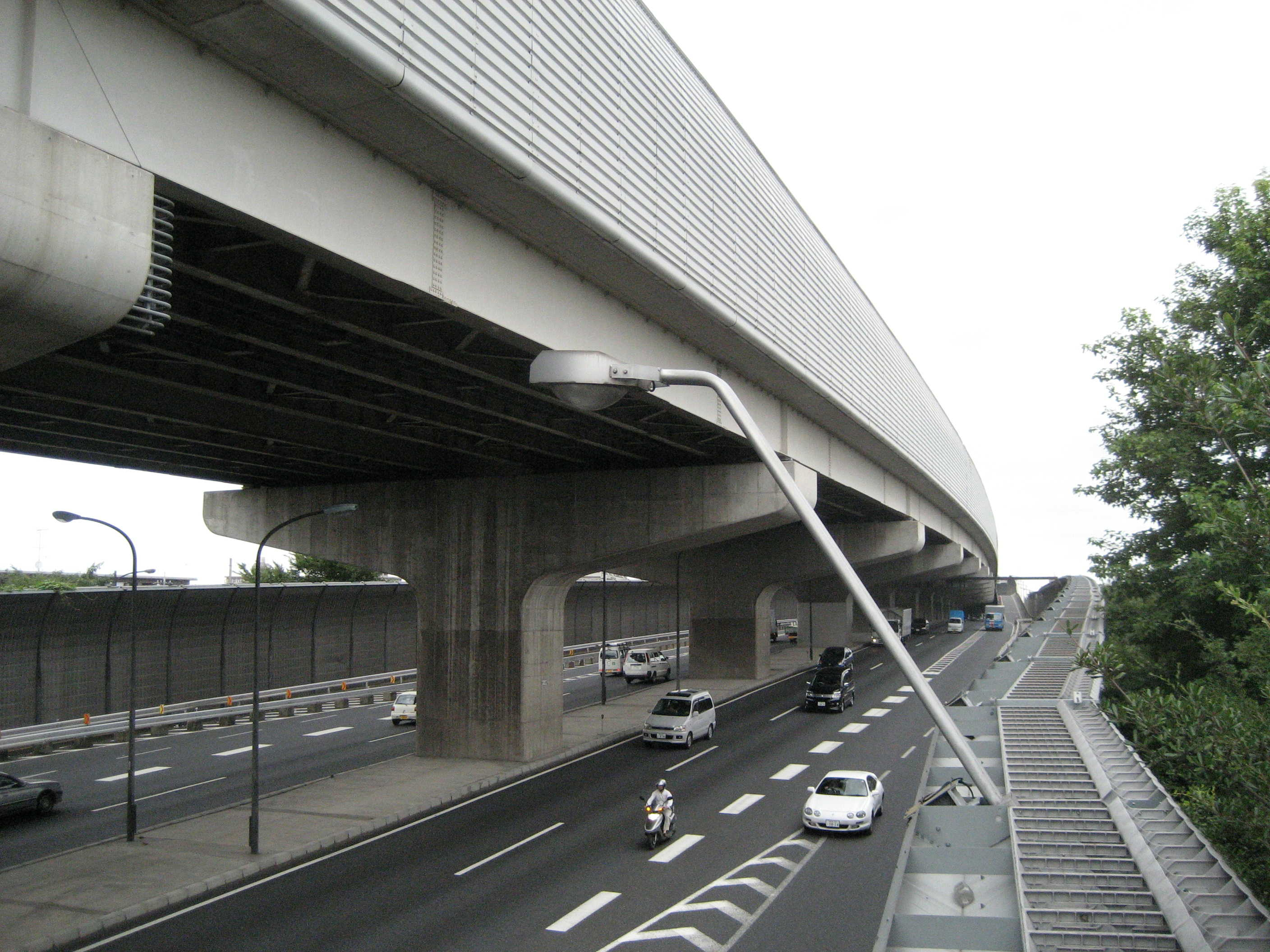
Typical Japanese expressway (Tokyo Gaikan Expressway) above the city road (Japan National Route 298)

According to Japan Statistical Yearbook 2015, Japan in April 2012 had approximately 1,215,000 km (755,000 mi) of roads made up of 1,022,000 km (635,000 mi) km of city, town and village roads, 129,000 km (80,000 mi) of prefectural roads, 55,000 km (34,000 mi) of general national highways and 8,050 km (5,000 mi) of national expressways. The Foreign Press Center/Japan cites a total length of expressways at 7,641 km (4,748 mi) (fiscal 2008). A single network of high-speed, divided, limited-access toll roads connects major cities on Honshu, Shikoku and Kyushu. Hokkaido has a separate network, and Okinawa Island has a highway of this type. In the year 2005, the toll collecting companies, formerly Japan Highway Public Corporation, have been transformed into private companies in public ownership, and there are plans to sell parts of them. This policy aims to encourage competition and decrease tolls.

Road passenger and freight transport expanded considerably during the 1980s as private ownership of motor vehicles greatly increased along with the quality and extent of the nation's roads. Bus companies including the JR Bus companies operate long-distance bus services on the nation's expanding expressway network. In addition to relatively low fares and deluxe seating, the buses are well utilized because they continue service during the night when air and train services are limited.

The cargo sector grew rapidly in the 1980s, recording 274.2 billion tonne-kilometres in 1990. The freight handled by motor vehicles, mainly trucks, in 1990, was over 6 billion tonnes, accounting for 90 percent of domestic freight tonnage and about 50 percent of tonne-kilometers.

Recent large infrastructure projects were the construction of the Great Seto Bridge and the Tokyo Bay Aqua-Line (opened 1997).

=== Road safety ===
Road fatalities have decreased in Japan, due in part to stricter enforcement of drunk driving laws:

- 2004 saw 7,358 deaths on Japanese roads,
- 2017 had 3,694 deaths for 125 million population,
- 2019 saw 3,215 deaths, the lowest it has been since 1948, with a rate of 25.4 deaths per million lower than many European nations, and close to the UK's rates.

In Tokyo, road safety is 13 killed per million.

== Air ==
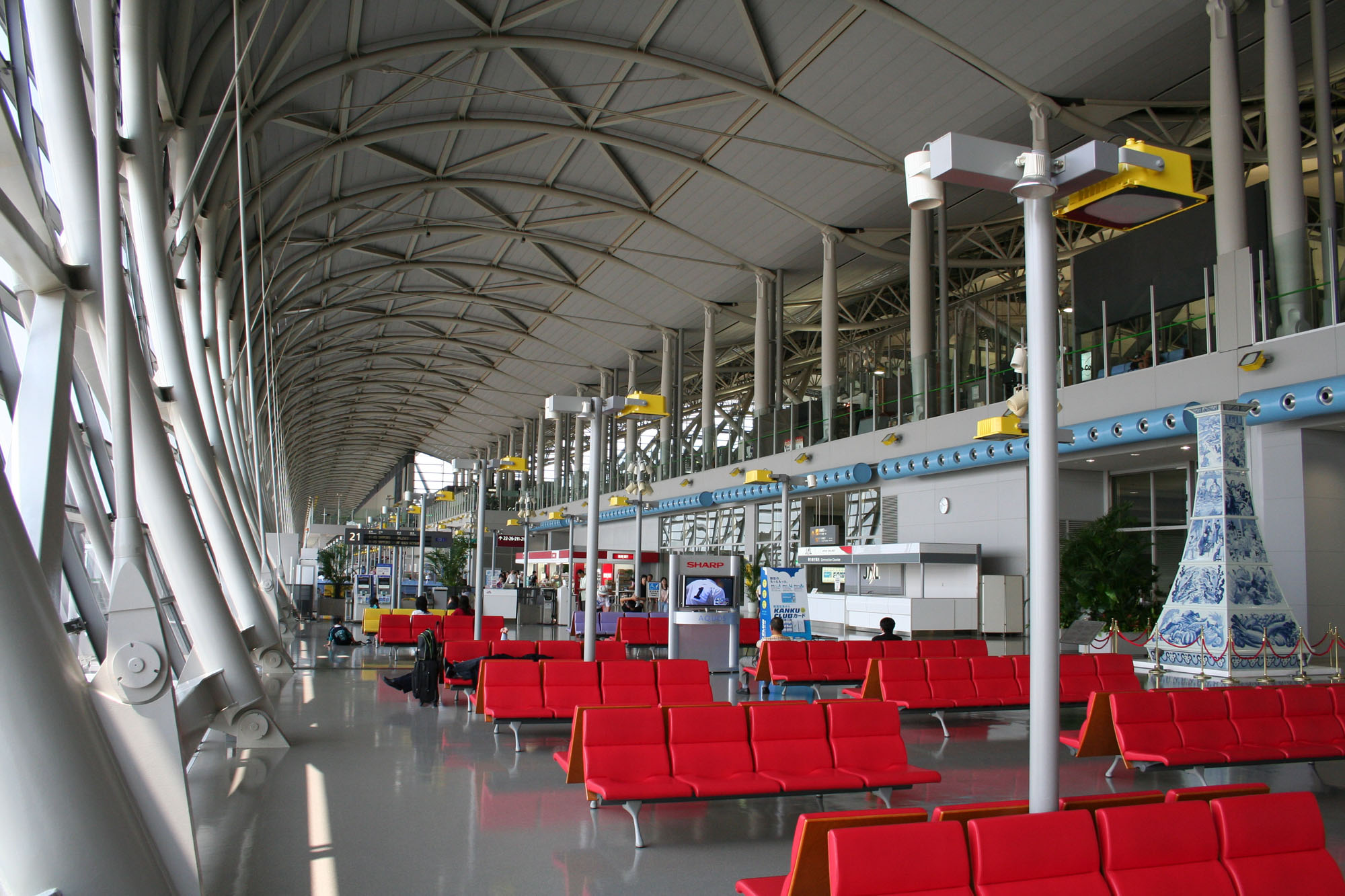
Kansai International Airport, Osaka

In 2013, Japan had the fourth largest passenger air market in the world with 105,913,000 passengers. In 2013 Japan had 98 airports. The main international gateways are Narita International Airport (Tokyo area), Kansai International Airport (Osaka/Kobe/Kyoto area), and Chūbu Centrair International Airport (Nagoya area). The main domestic hub is Tokyo International Airport (Haneda Airport), by passenger traffic the third-busiest in Asia and the fourth-busiest in the world in 2018, but not in the top ten in 2022; other major traffic hubs include Osaka International Airport, New Chitose Airport outside Sapporo, and Fukuoka Airport. 14 heliports are estimated to exist (1999).

Passenger airlines of Japan

The two main airlines are Japan Airlines and All Nippon Airways. Other passenger carriers include Skymark Airlines, Solaseed Air, Air Do, StarFlyer and Fuji Dream Airlines. United Airlines and Delta Air Lines, formerly Northwest Airlines, are major international operators from Narita Airport.

From the early 1970s under Japan’s “45/47 regime”, the government allocated route rights among the three major carriers of that time. JAL for international and trunk domestic routes, ANA for trunk and local domestic services, and JAS for local/domestic routes.

Domestic airfares in Japan were subject to government regulation until around 2000. Discount fare schemes were introduced in the mid-1990s, allowing reductions of up to about 50%.

JAL and JAS merged in 2002/2004, reducing the number of major domestic carriers.

== Maritime ==
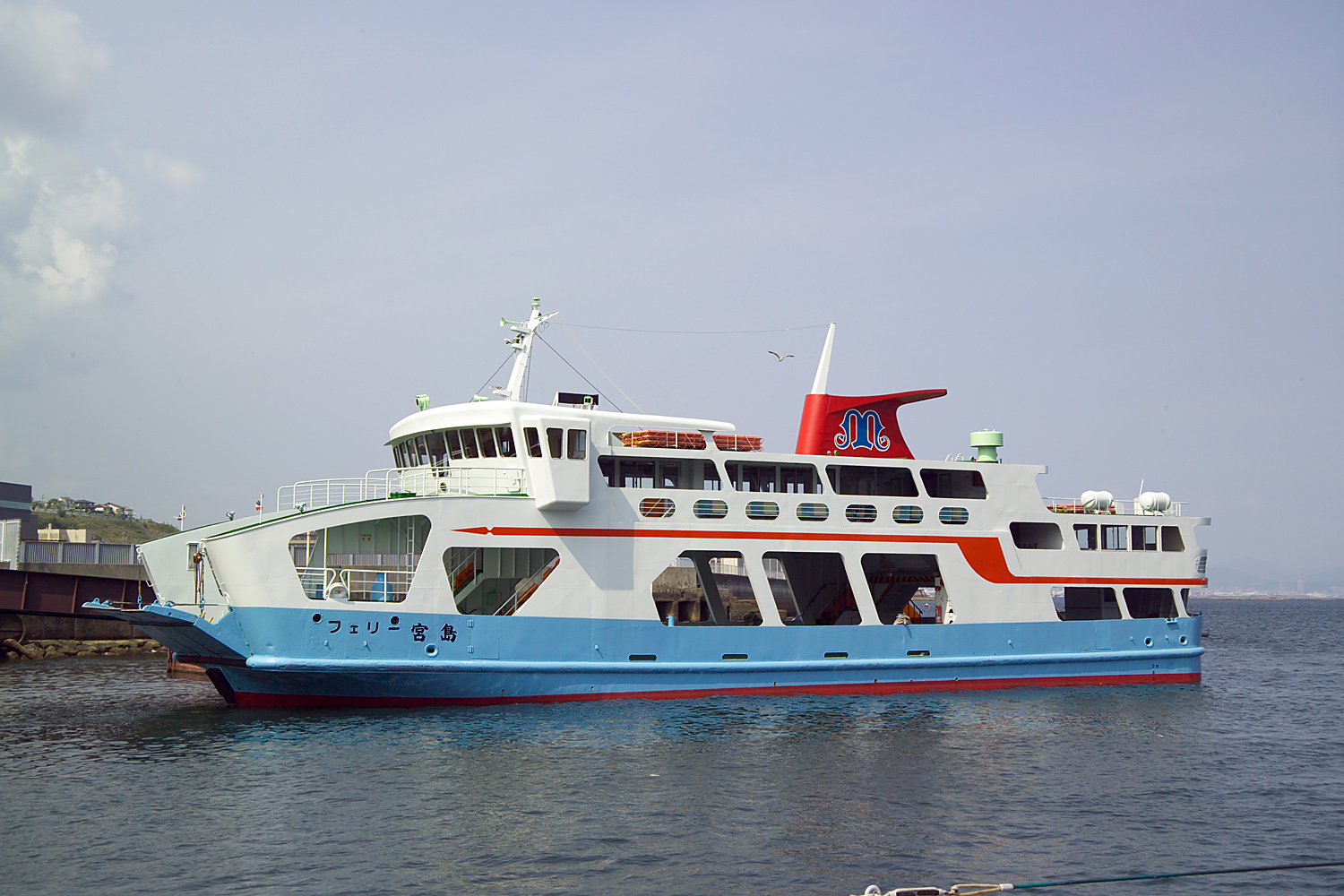
Ferry Miyajima on the Inland Sea near Miyajima, Hiroshima

There are approximately 1,770 km (1,100 mi) of waterways in Japan; seagoing craft ply all coastal inland seas.

There are 994 ports in Japan as of April 2014. There are overlapping classifications of these ports, some of which are multi-purpose, e.g. cargo, passenger, naval, and fishery. The five designated "super" container ports are Yokkaichi, Yokohama, Nagoya, Kobe, and Osaka. 23 are designated major/international, 125 designated as important, while there are also purely fisherman ports.

The twenty-three major seaports designated as special, important ports by the Ministry of Land, Infrastructure, Transport and Tourism: Chiba, Fushiki/Toyama, Himeji, Hiroshima, Kawasaki, Kitakyushu, Kobe, Kudamatsu, Muroran, Nagoya, Niigata, Osaka, Sakai/Senpoku, Sendai/Shiogama, Shimizu, Shimonoseki, Tokyo, Tomakomai, Wakayama, Yokkaichi, and Yokohama.

Japan has 988 ships of 1,000 gross tonnage (GT) or over on its national ship register, totaling 38,053,000 tonnes deadweight (DWT). However, only 17% of Japanese-owned capacity is registered in Japan. UNCTAD estimates that 224 million dwt of tonnage is controlled by Japanese owners, making Japan the second largest beneficial owner of tonnage after Greece.

Ferries connect Hokkaido to Honshu, and Okinawa Island to Kyushu and Honshu. They also connect other smaller islands and the main islands. The scheduled international passenger routes are to China, Russia, South Korea, and Taiwan. Coastal and cross-channel ferries on the main islands decreased in routes and frequencies following the development of bridges and expressways but some are still operating (as of 2007).

== Pipelines ==
As of the early 21st century, Japan has 84 km (52 mi) of pipelines for crude oil, 322 km (200 mi) for petroleum products, and 1,800 km (1,100 mi) for natural gas.More recent data from the IEA indicates the total natural gas network, including local distribution, has expanded to over 261,000 km.

== By region ==
- Transport in Greater Tokyo
- Transport in Keihanshin
- Transport in Greater Nagoya
- Transport in Fukuoka-Kitakyushu
