= Transport in Fukuoka–Kitakyushu =

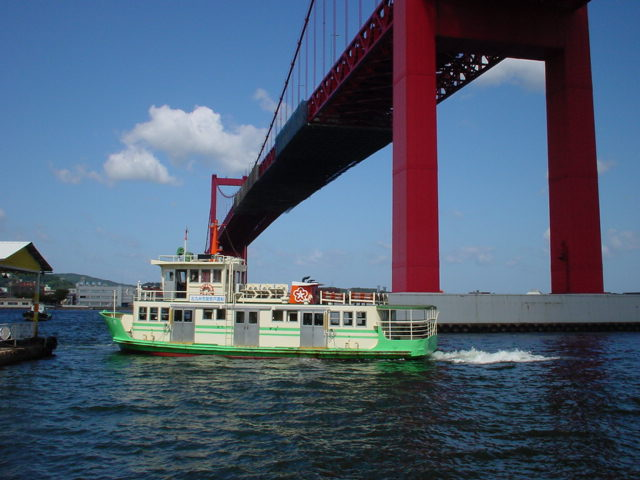
Wakato Ferry between the straits

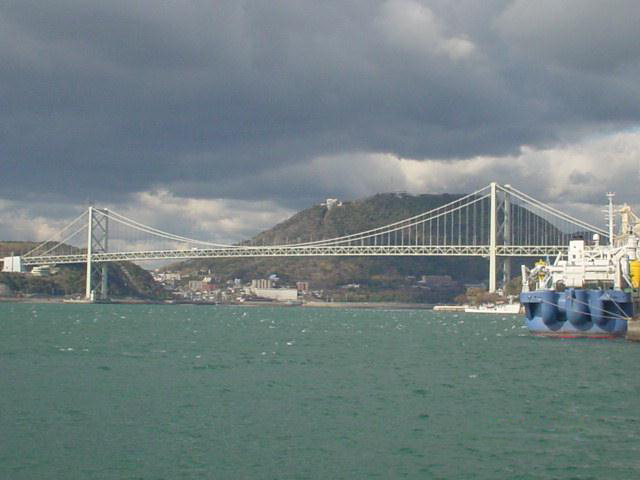
Kanmonkyo Bridge is a vital traffic link in the region

Transport in Fukuoka-Kitakyushu is similar to that of other large cities in Japan, but with a high degree of private transport. The region is a hub of international ferry services and has a high degree of air connectivity and a considerable rail transport network, complemented with highways and surface streets. It includes public and private rail and highway networks; airports for international, domestic, and general aviation; buses; motorcycle delivery services, walking, bicycling, and commercial shipping. The foci of the public transport system are Hakata Station, Tenjin Station, and Kokura Station, in Fukuoka and Kitakyushu cities respectively. Between these two cities lies a more sparse weblike regional rail network.

The transit network consists of 32 surface and subterranean railway lines (see section on rail transport) operated by several and private operators. Monorails, trams, fixed-guideway lines and buses support this primary rail network. Like other cities in Japan, walking and bicycling is common.

== Rail transport ==
=== Overview ===
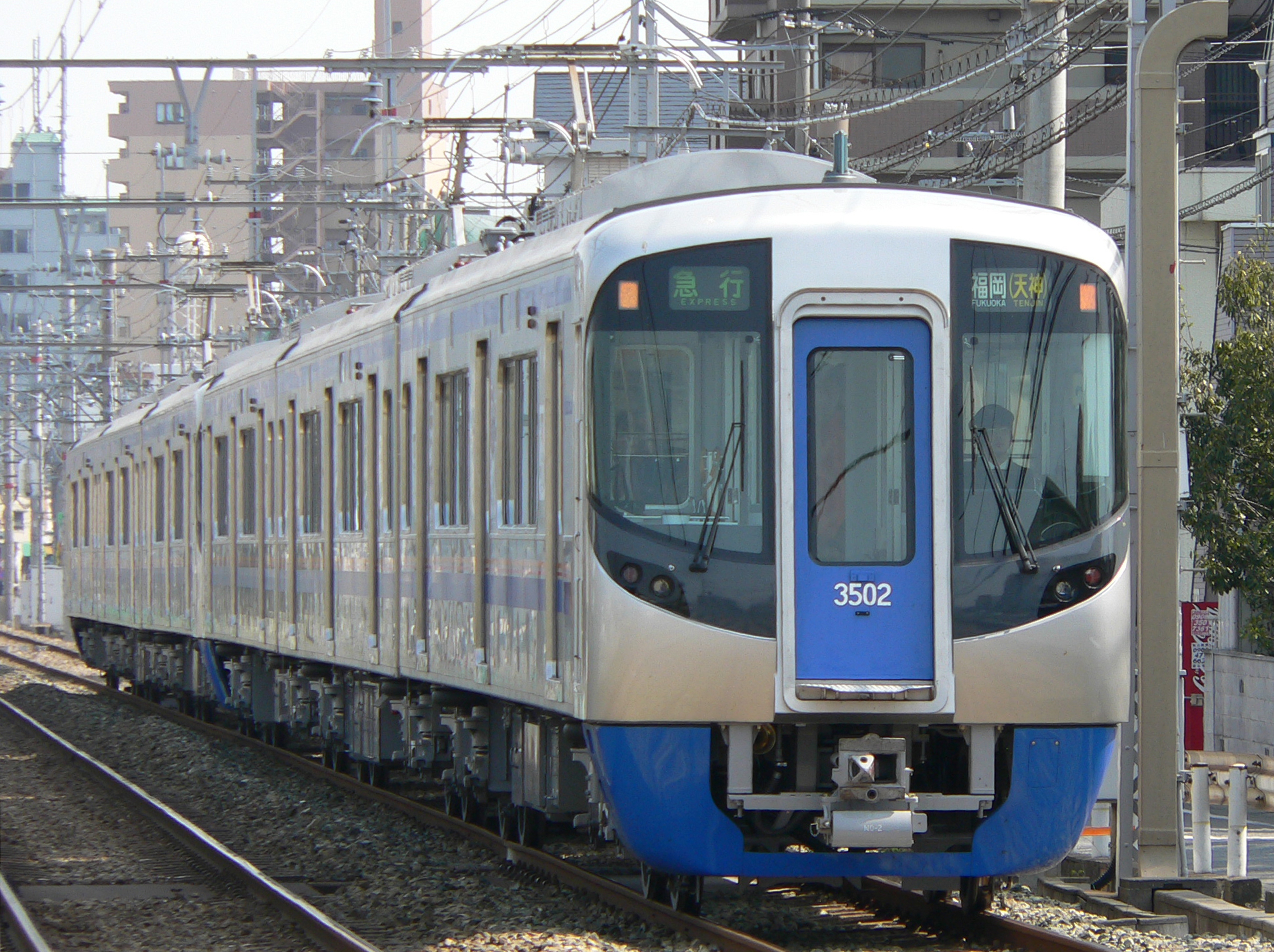
Nishitetsu 3000 series EMUs

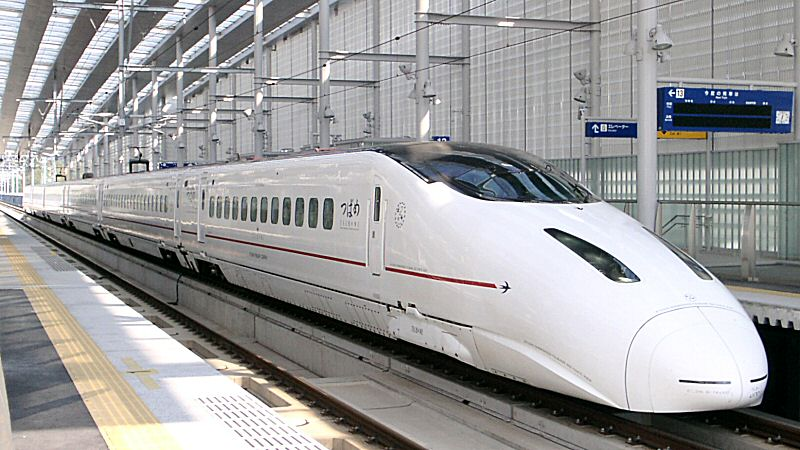
Kyūshū Shinkansen

The passenger rail network in Fukuoka-Kitakyushu metropolitan area (see also Northern Kyushu) is dense around the cities of Fukuoka and Kitakyushu and Shimonoseki, declining in density between and around the two primary cities. Passenger railway usage and density is lower than that of Greater Tokyo or Keihanshin, with the region having a little less than 6 million people. Similar to other areas of Japan, few free maps exist of the entire network; only stations of a particular company are shown, along with key transfer points. The Sanyō Shinkansen serves as the backbone of intercity rail transport connecting Hakata and Kokura Stations to Honshu. Kyūshū Shinkansen lines are completed on March 12, 2011, running to Kagoshima.

There are 33 operating passenger rail lines and a tourist-oriented cable car line in the Fukuoka-Kitakyushu area .

=== List of passenger railway lines in operation ===
- JR Kyushu and JR West
  - high-speed rail
    - Sanyō Shinkansen
    - Kyūshū Shinkansen
  - Intercity
    - Fukuhoku Yutaka Line (Sasaguri Line and Chikuho Main Line)
    - Gotōji Line
    - Kagoshima Main Line
    - Nippo Main Line
    - Hitahikosan Line
    - Kashii Line (Uminonakamichi Line)
    - Chikuhi Line
    - Hakata Minami Line
- Nishi-Nippon Railroad (Nishitetsu)
  - Tenjin Ōmuta Line
  - Kaizuka Line
- Fukuoka City Subway
  - Airport Line
  - Hakozaki Line
  - Nanakuma Line
- Amagi Railway Amagi Line
- Chikuhō Electric Railroad Line
- Heisei Chikuhō Railway
- Kitakyūshū Monorail

=== List of cable car systems in operation ===
- Hobashira Cable

== Bridges ==
The bridge over the Kanmon Straits plays an important connectivity role in the region, supporting automobile, rail, and ferry traffic between Honshu and Kyushu islands.

== Road transport ==
=== Local and regional highways ===
- Route 2
- Route 3
- Route 9
- Route 10
- Route 34
- Route 190
- Route 191
- Route 198
- Route 199
- Route 200
- Route 201
- Route 202
- Route 208
- Route 209
- Route 210
- Route 211
- Route 263
- Route 264
- Route 316
- Route 322
- Route 385
- Route 386
- Route 442
- Route 443
- Route 490
- Route 491
- Route 495
- Route 496
- Route 497 part of Nishi-Kyūshū Expressway
- Route 500

=== Expressways ===
Major area expressways include:

- Fukuoka Urban Expressway
- Kitakyūshū Urban Expressway
- Kyūshū Expressway
- Nagasaki Expressway
- Ōita Expressway
- Nishi-Kyūshū Expressway
- Higashi-Kyūshū Expressway
- Chugoku Expressway
- Sanyō Expressway

=== Buses ===
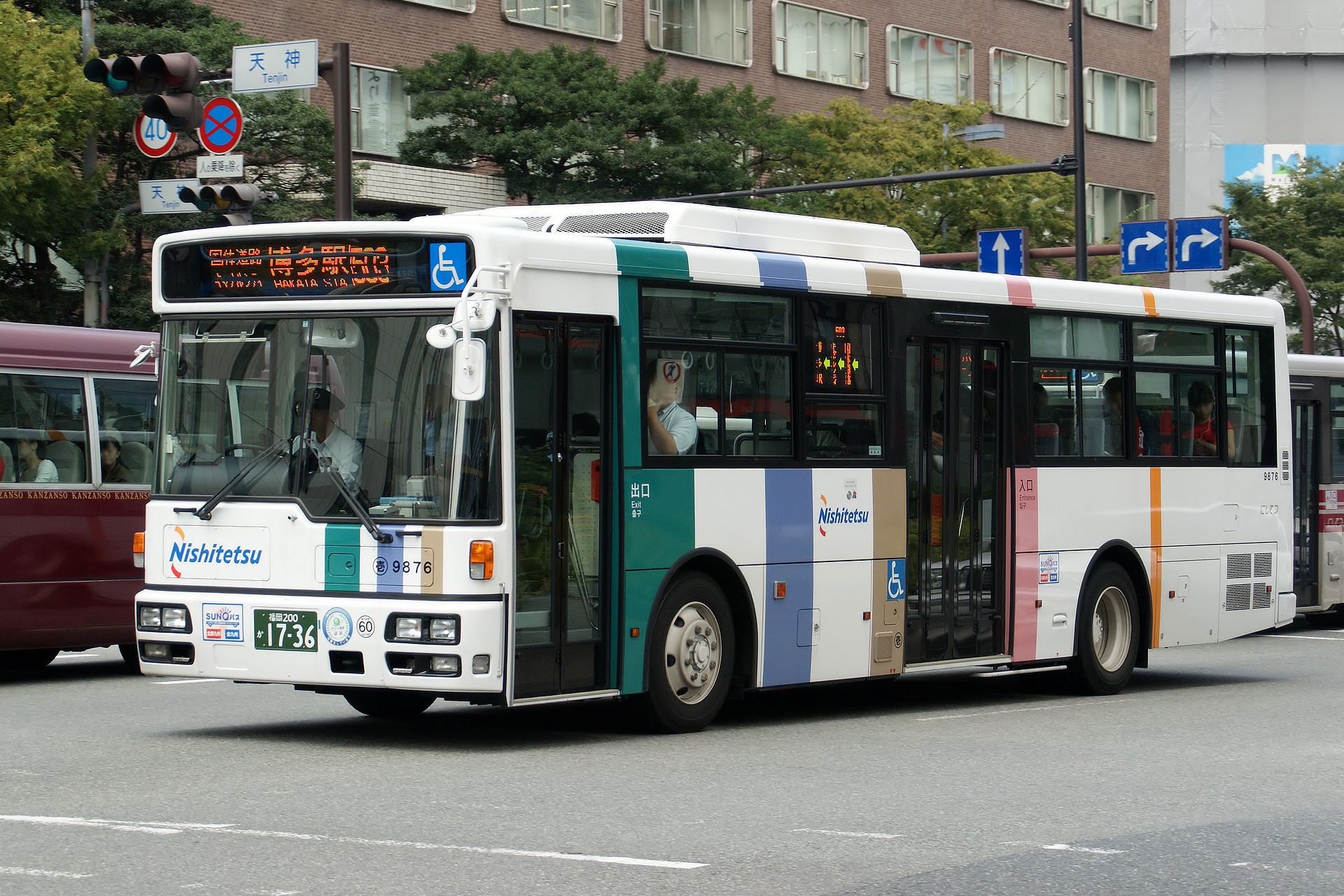
Nishitetsu bus

Several private and public bus companies operate with hundreds of routes throughout the region. Most local bus routes complement existing rail service to form an effective intermodal transit network.

== Air transport ==
=== Primary ===
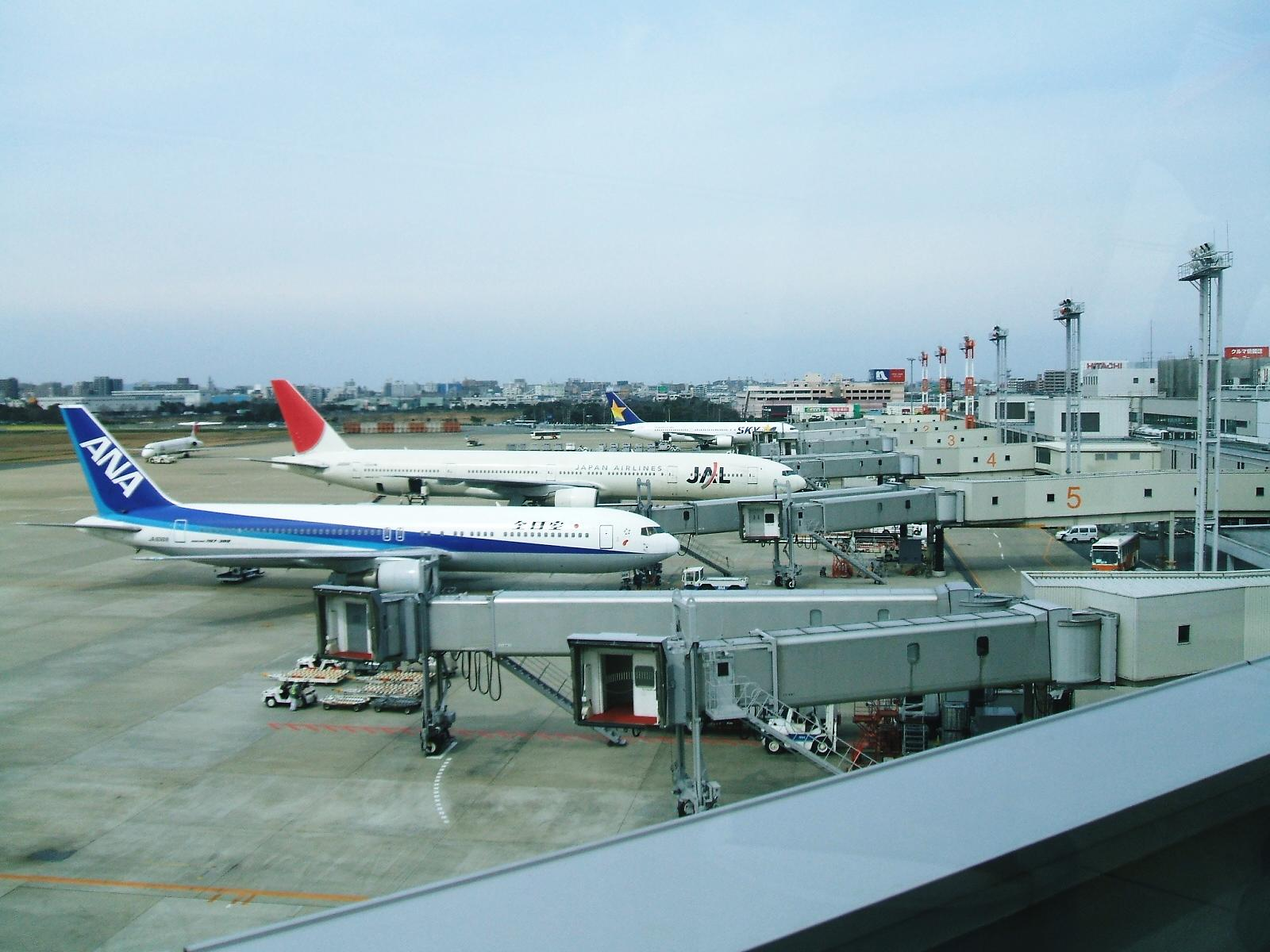
Airplanes parked at Fukuoka airport

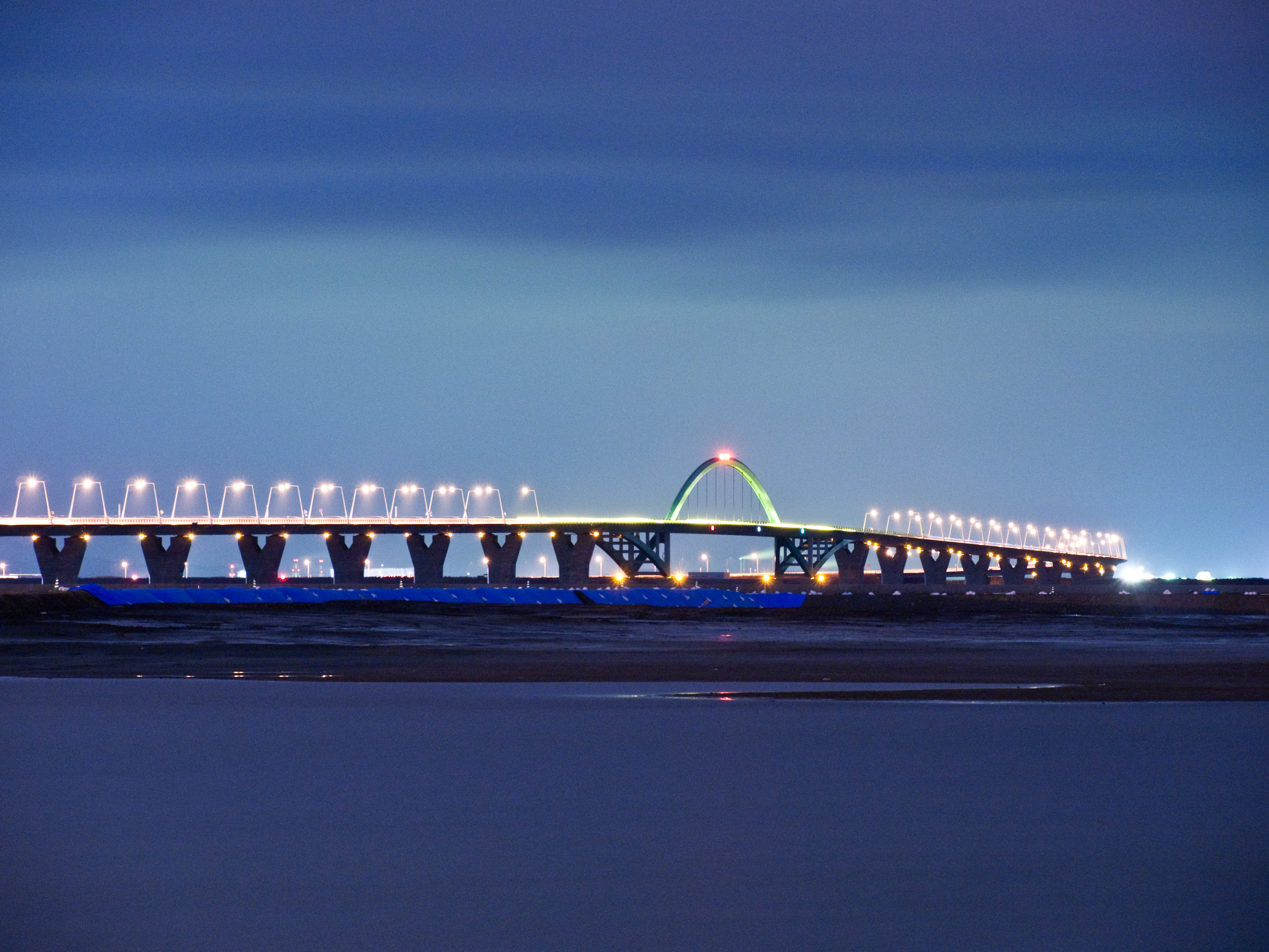
Bridge to Kitakyūshū Airport's artificial island.

Fukuoka Airport is the busiest airport in the region, serving international and domestic flights. Kitakyushu Airport is an international airport built on an artificial island in the Inland Sea, and serves as a major cargo hub for Kityakyushu area factories as well as a relief airport for Fukuoka.

=== Secondary ===
Saga Airport also provide air services to the region. Just outside the region is Oita Airport and Kumamoto Airport.

There are also a number of Japan Air Self-Defense Force airfields.

== Maritime transport ==
Major area seaports include:

- Port of Hakata
- Port of Shimonoseki
- Port of Kokura
- Port of Shin Moji

=== Passenger ferries ===
See List of ferry operators in Japan.

==== International ====
Because of its geographic proximity to Korea and China, the region is the major hub in Japan for international passenger ferries. Pukwan Ferry, Camelia Line, and high-speed ferry Beetle (JR Kyushu), Kobee operate out of both Hakata and Shimonseki, there are also ferry services to Shanghai and Dalian in China, Busan, Ulsan in Korea.

==== Regional Domestic ====
There are ferry services to Tsushima Island as well as major Japanese cities (such as Hiroshima, Osaka, Matsuyama, Tokushima, Kōbe and Tokyo) from Fukuoka, Kitakyushu, and Shimonoseki ports.

==== Cross Strait/Local ====
Within the Kanmon-Kitakyūshū area, there are three commuter ferry lines: the Wakato Ferry, the Kanmon Straits Ferry, and the Kanmon Straits Liner. There are services to some small islands near Kitakyushu and Fukuoka from their respective cities as well.

=== Shipping ===
Shipping plays a major role moving freight in and out of the Fukuoka-Kitakyushu area. Finished automobiles for export are handled by ports in the region. With just-in-time requirements of automobile manufacturers and suppliers, Kitakyūshū Airport plays an important role as a hub for cargo and logistics.

The region is home to three regasification LNG terminals.

== Other modes ==
In addition to the primary modes of transport—rail, bus, road, air, and sea—Greater Fukuoka offers several other transportation options that contribute to its comprehensive transit network.

=== Cycling ===
Cycling is an increasingly popular mode of transport in Greater Fukuoka, particularly for short-distance travel within the city. Fukuoka City has invested in cycling infrastructure, including dedicated bike lanes and bike-sharing programs. The “Chari Chari” bike-sharing service, for example, allows residents and visitors to rent bicycles from various locations across the city, promoting an eco-friendly and healthy alternative to motorized transport. The city’s relatively flat terrain makes it conducive to cycling, and many residents use bicycles for commuting, shopping, and recreational activities.

== See also ==
- Transport in Greater Tokyo
- Transport in Keihanshin
- Transport in Greater Nagoya
