= Transport in Keihanshin =

Transport in the Keihanshin metropolitan region is much like that of Tokyo: it includes public and private rail and highway networks; airports for international, domestic, and general aviation; buses; motorcycle delivery services, walking, bicycling, and commercial shipping. The nexus is in the central part of Osaka, though Kobe and Kyoto are major centers in their own right. Every part of Keihanshin has rail or road transport services. Sea and air transport is available from a limited number of ports for the general public.

Public transport within Keihanshin is dominated by an extensive public system, beginning with an urban rail network second only to that of Greater Tokyo, consisting of over seventy railway lines of surface trains and subways run by numerous operators; buses, monorails, and trams support the primary rail network. Over 13 million people use the public transit system daily as their primary means of travel. Like Tokyo, walking and bicycling are much more common than in many cities around the globe. Trips by bicycle (including joint trips with railway) in Osaka is at 33.9% with railway trips alone having the highest share at 36.4%, the combined railway share (rail alone, rail and bus, rail and bicycle) is at 45.7%. Walking alone has a modal share of 8.5%. Private automobiles and motorcycles play a secondary role in urban transport with private automobiles only having a 9.9% modal share in Osaka.

== Airports ==
=== Primary ===
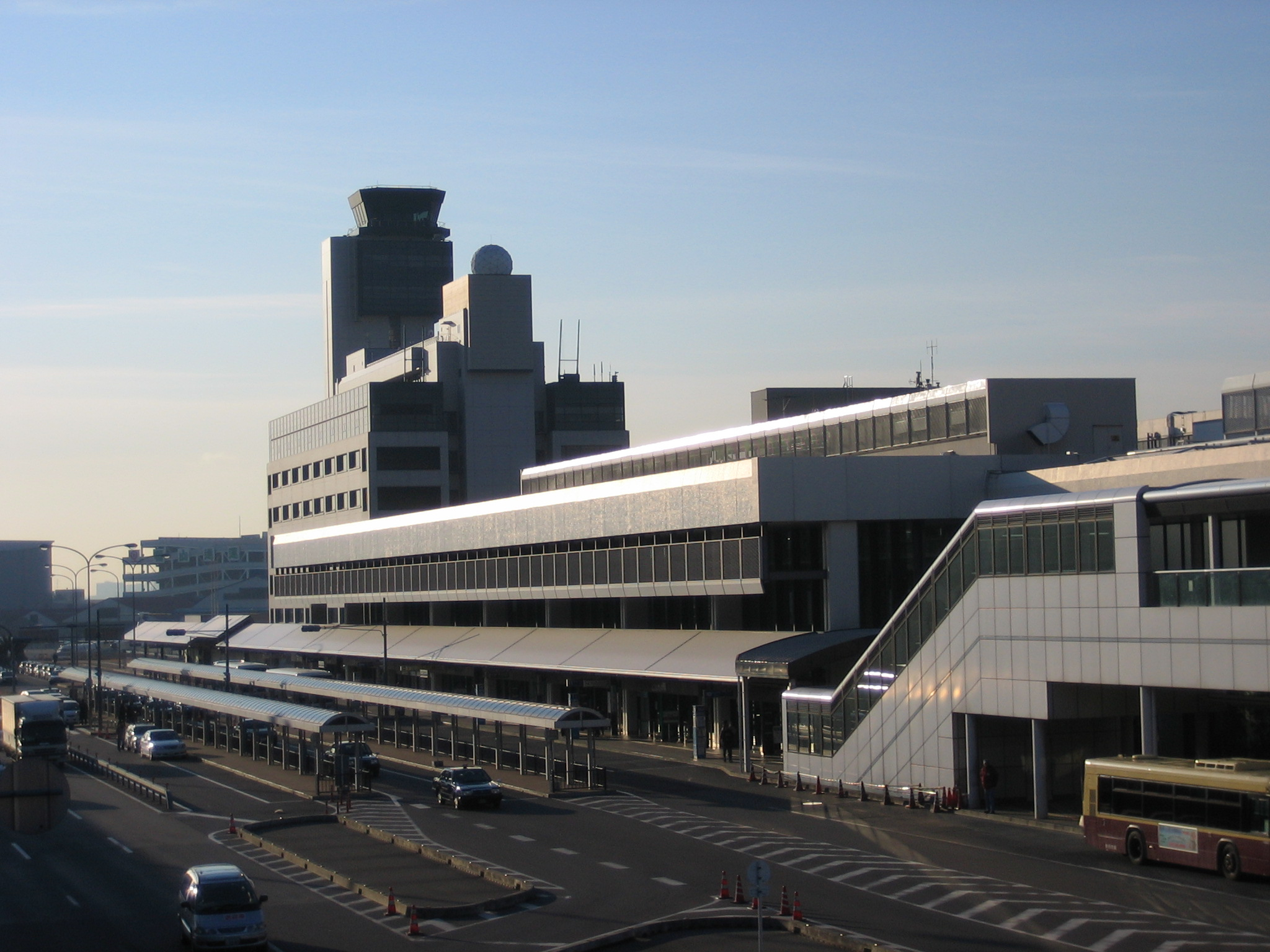
Osaka International Airport (Itami)

Osaka Airport (Itami Airport) served 16 million domestic passengers in 2019, and Kansai International Airport served 29 million international and domestic passengers. Kobe Airport is the region's newest airport, and has mostly domestic services, with a few international charter flights, serving 3 million passengers.

=== Secondary ===
Yao Airport serves the area's general aviation needs. Still further across Osaka Bay into Shikoku lies Tokushima Airport, also capable of handling large planes, and a possible alternative airport for the region (for evacuation, disaster relief, emergency landings, cargo, overload etc.).

There are also a number of JASDF military facilities.

== Rail ==
The rail network in Keihanshin is very dense, with the average number of daily passengers topping 13 million. Railway usage and density is similar to that of Greater Tokyo, despite the smaller population base of Keihanshin. As in Tokyo, few free maps exist of the entire network; instead, most show only the stations of a particular company, and whole network maps (see, for example, this map of Keihanshin's rail network) often are confusing simply because they are so large.

In addition to above-ground and below-ground rail lines, the Sanyō and Tōkaidō Shinkansen serve as the backbone of intercity rail transport.

=== History ===
Japan's first streetcar opened in 1895 in Kyoto.

=== List of operating passenger rail lines ===
- West Japan Railway Company (JR West)
  - High-speed rail
    - San'yō Shinkansen
  - Intercity of JR West
    - Tōkaidō Main Line
      - ●Biwako Line
      - ●JR Kyoto Line
      - ●JR Kobe Line
    - San'yō Main Line
      - ●JR Kobe Line
    - Fukuchiyama Line
      - ●JR Takarazuka Line
    - Hokuriku Main Line
      - ●Biwako Line shared with Tokaido Main Line
    - Kansai Main Line
      - ●Yamatoji Line
    - Kakogawa Line
    - Kisei Main Line
      - Kinokuni Line
    - Sanin Main Line
      - ●Sagano Line
  - Urban Network of JR West
    - Akō Line
    - Biwako Line
    - ●Hanwa Line
    - Kansai Airport Line
    - ●Katamachi Line (Gakkentoshi Line)
    - JR Kobe Line
    - ●Kosei Line
    - JR Kyoto Line
    - Nara Line
    - ●Osaka Loop Line
    - ●Osaka Higashi Line
    - Sagano Line
    - Sakurai Line (Man-yo Mahoroba Line)
    - Sakurajima Line (JR Yumesaki Line)
    - JR Takarazuka Line
    - ●JR Tōzai Line
    - Yamatoji Line
    - Wakayama Line
- JR Central
  - High-speed rail
    - Tōkaidō Shinkansen
- Hanshin Electric Railway
  - Main Line
  - Hanshin Namba Line
  - Mukogawa Line
- Hankai Tramway
  - Hankai Line
  - Uemachi Line
- Hankyu Railway
  - ●Kobe Line
    - Itami Line
    - Imazu Line
    - Kōyō Line
    - Kōbe Kōsoku Line
  - ●Takarazuka Line
    - Minoo Line
  - ●Kyoto Line
    - Senri Line
    - Arashiyama Line
- Keihan Electric Railway
  - Keihan Main Line
    - Ōtō Line
    - Nakanoshima Line
    - Katano Line
    - Uji Line
  - Keishin Line
  - Ishiyama Sakamoto Line
- Kintetsu
  - Nara Line
    - Namba Line
    - Ikoma Line
  - Kyoto Line
  - Kashihara Line
    - Tenri Line
    - Tawaramoto Line
  - Keihanna Line
  - Osaka Line
    - Shigi Line
  - Minami Osaka Line
    - Yoshino Line
    - Domyoji Line
    - Nagano Line
    - Gose Line
- Kintetsu owned, but different operator
  - Iga Line
- Nankai Electric Railway
  - Nankai Main Line
    - Takashinohama Line
    - Airport Line
    - Tanagawa Line
    - Kada Line
  - Wakayamako Line
  - Koya Line
    - Shiomibashi Line
- Kita-Osaka Kyuko Railway
- Osaka Metro
  - ●Midōsuji Line
  - ●Tanimachi Line
  - ●Yotsubashi Line
  - ●Chūō Line
  - ●Sennichimae Line
  - ●Sakaisuji Line
  - ●Nagahori Tsurumi-ryokuchi Line
  - ●Imazatosuji Line
  - ●Nankō Port Town Line
- Kyoto Municipal Subway
  - ●Karasuma Line
  - ●Tōzai Line
- Kobe Municipal Subway
  - ●Seishin-Yamate Line
  - ●Kaigan Line
- Osaka Monorail
- Kobe Electric Railway
  - Arima Line
  - Ao Line
  - Sanda Line
  - Shintetsu Kōen-Toshi Line
- Sanyo Electric Railway
  - Main Line
  - Aboshi Line
- Kobe Rapid Railway
  - Tozai Line
  - Namboku Line
  - Hokushin Line
- Keifuku Electric Railroad
  - Arashiyama Main Line
  - Kitano Line
- Eizan Electric Railway
  - Eizan Main Line
  - Kurama Line
- Nose Electric Railway
  - Myōken Line
  - Nissei Line
- Kobe New Transit
  - Port Island Line (Port Liner)
  - Rokkō Island Line (Rokko Liner)

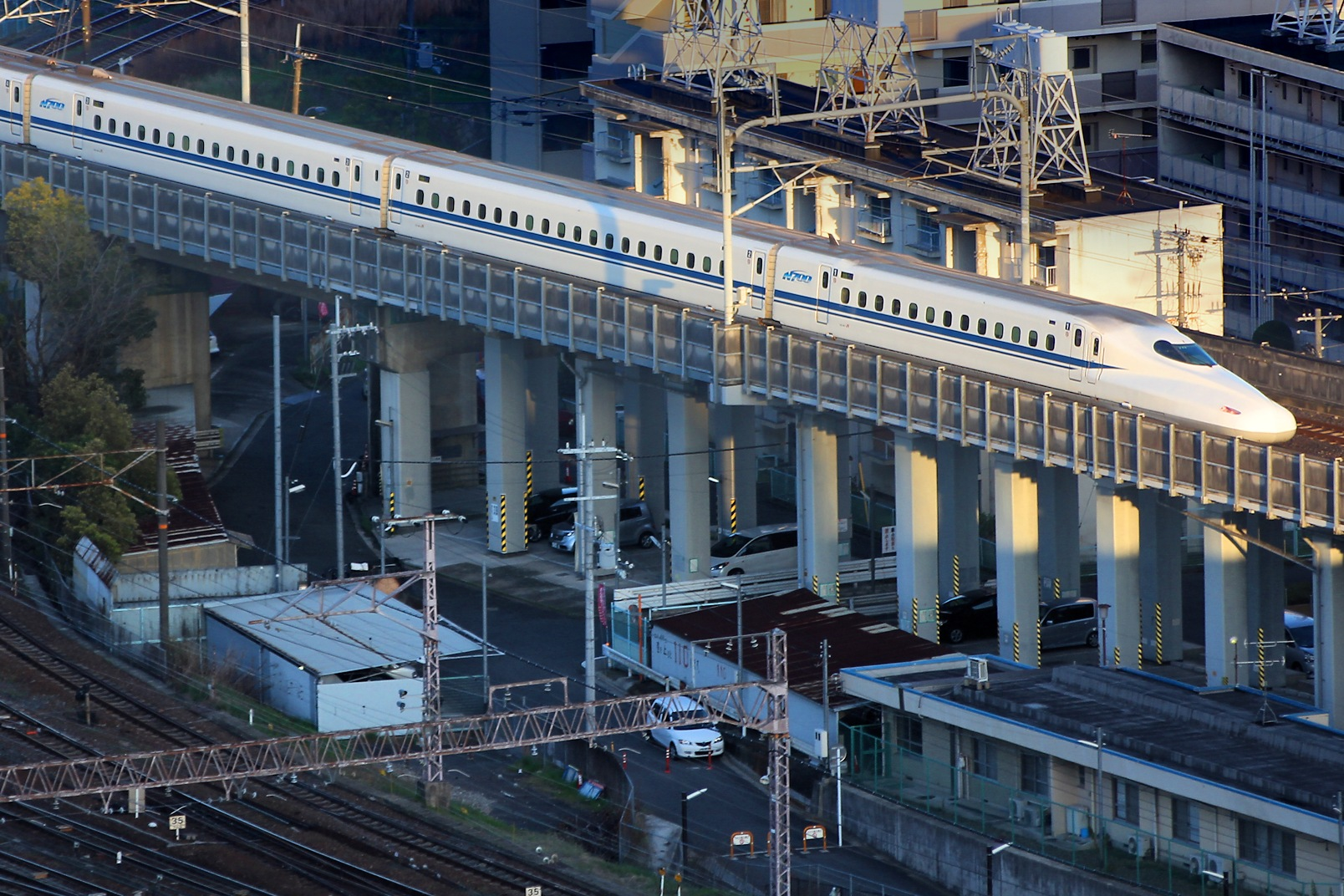
JR Central Tōkaidō Shinkansen arriving at Kyoto Station

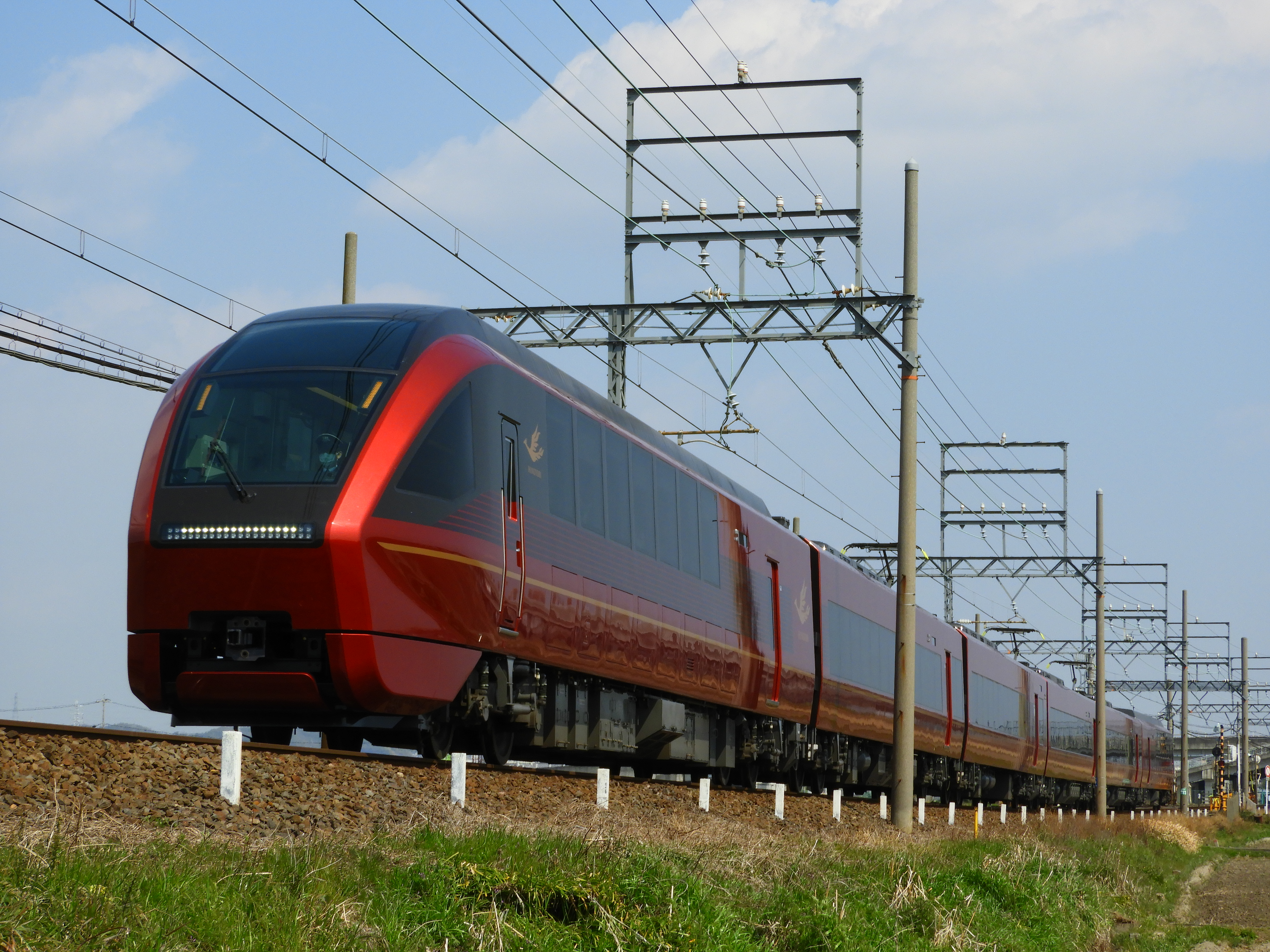
Kintetsu Railway Hinotori Service

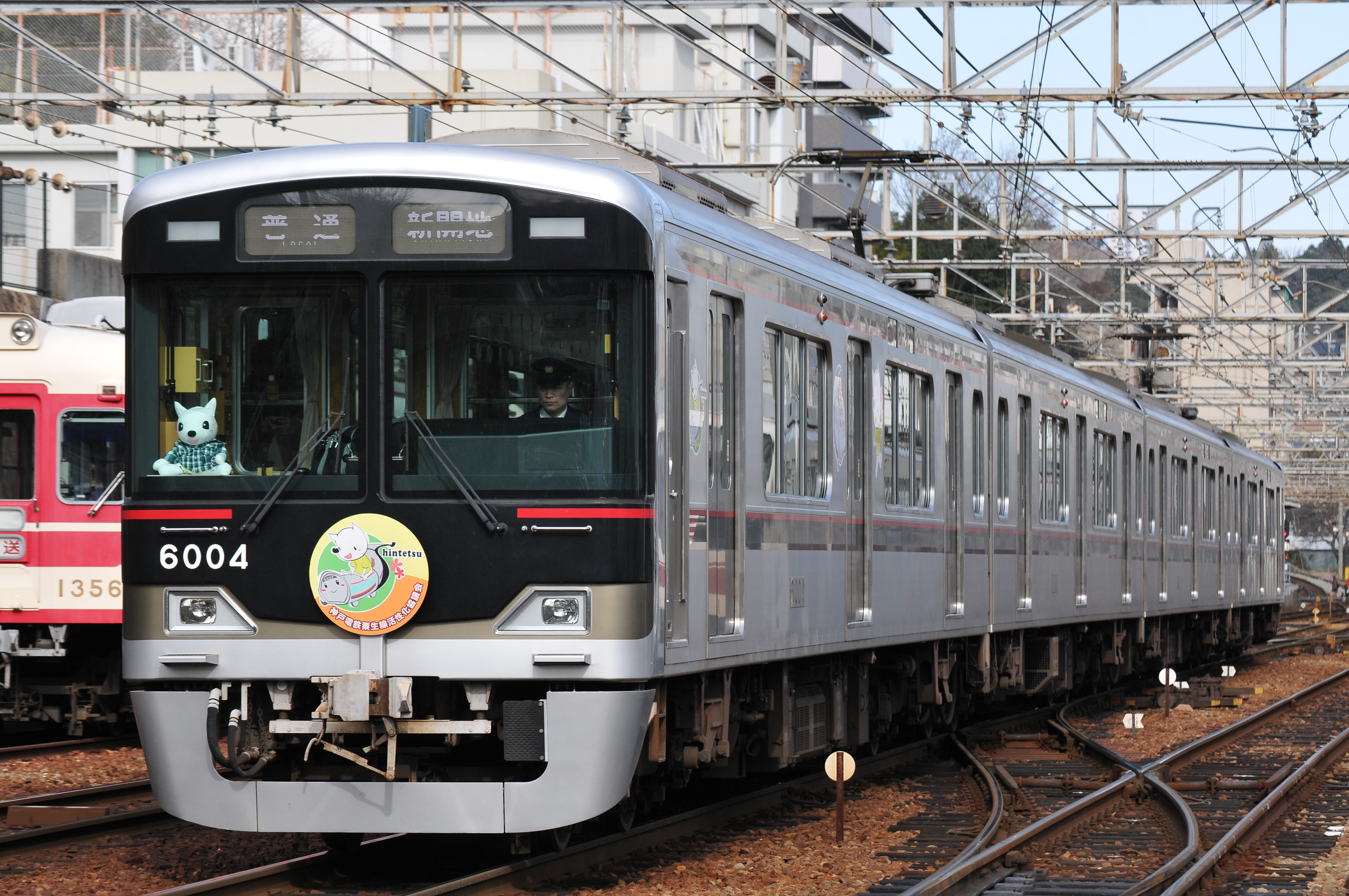
Kobe Electric Railway

=== List of cable car/funicular lines ===
- Keihan Electric Railway Cable Line (鋼索線), also called Otokoyama Cable (男山ケーブル)
- Kintetsu
  - Ikoma Cable Line (Toriimae - Ikoma-Sanjo)
  - Nishi-Shigi Cable Line
  - Katsuragisan Ropeway
- Nankai Railway Cable Line (鋼索線)
- Sanyo Electric Railway Sumaura Ropeway
- Keifuku Electric Railroad
  - Eizan Cable (叡山鋼索線)
  - Eizan Ropeway (叡山ロープウェイ)
- Nose Electric Railway Myōken Cable

=== List of incomplete/abandoned lines ===
- Japanese National Railways/JR West
  - Osaka Minato Line
  - Osaka Tōkō Line
- Hanshin Electric Railway
  - Kita-Osaka Line
  - Kokudo Line
  - Koshien Line
  - Amagasaki Kaigan Line
  - Mukogawa Line
  - Imazu Deyashiki Line
  - Amagasaki Takarazuka Line
  - Daini Hanshin Line
- Hankai Tramway
  - Hirano Line
  - Ohama Branch Line
- Hankyu Electric Railway
  - Kitano Line
  - Kamitsutsui Line
- Kintetsu
  - Hase Line (長谷線)
  - Sanjo Line (山上線)
  - Horyuji Line (法隆寺線)
  - Obusa Line (小房線)
  - Higashi-Shigi Cable Line
  - Hokusei Line (北勢線)
- Nankai Railway
  - Tennoji Branch Line (天王寺支線)
  - Kitajima Branch Line (北島支線)
  - Wakayamako Line (和歌山港線)
  - Osaka Tram Line (大阪軌道線)
  - Hirano Line (平野線)
  - Ohama Branch Line (大浜支線)
  - Wakayama Tram Line (和歌山軌道線)

=== Rail Ridership ===
Following table lists annual ridership in millions of passengers a year, average daily in parentheses.

Operator	Annual (daily) 1993 (peak year)	Annual (daily) 2007
West Japan Railway Company (Kansai Only)	943 (2,584,000)	961 (2,633,000)
Kintetsu (Kansai Only)	806	611
Nankai Railway	310	231
Keihan Railway	419	291
Hankyu Railway	787	601
Hanshin Railway	221	162
SubTotal	2,545 (6,972,000)	1,899 (5,202,000)
Osaka Municipal Subway	N/A	2,234,000
Semboku Rapid Railway	58 (158,900)	51.1 (140,100)
Kyoto Municipal Subway		(344,000)
Osaka Monorail		(100,600)
Totals	-	3,037 (8,320,700)

Note above table does not yet include figures for Kobe Municipal Subway, Kitakyu, Kobe New Transit, Kobe Rapid, Noseden, or Shintetsu.

== Buses ==
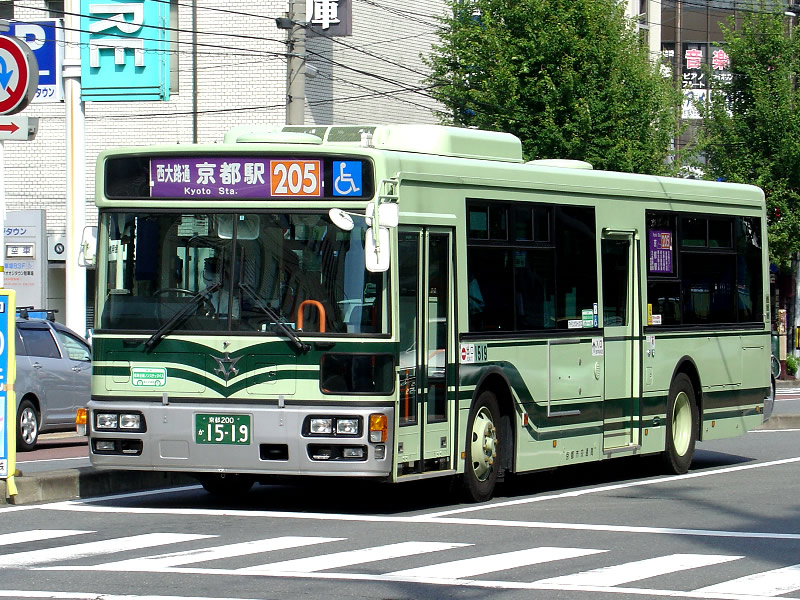
Kyoto City Bus

There are numerous private and public bus companies with hundreds of routes throughout the region. Most bus routes complement existing rail service to form an effective intermodal transit network.

== Taxis ==
Taxis also serve a similar role to buses, supplementing the rail system, especially after midnight when most rail lines cease to operate. Persons moving around the city on business often chose taxis for convenience, as do people setting out in small groups.

== Roads ==
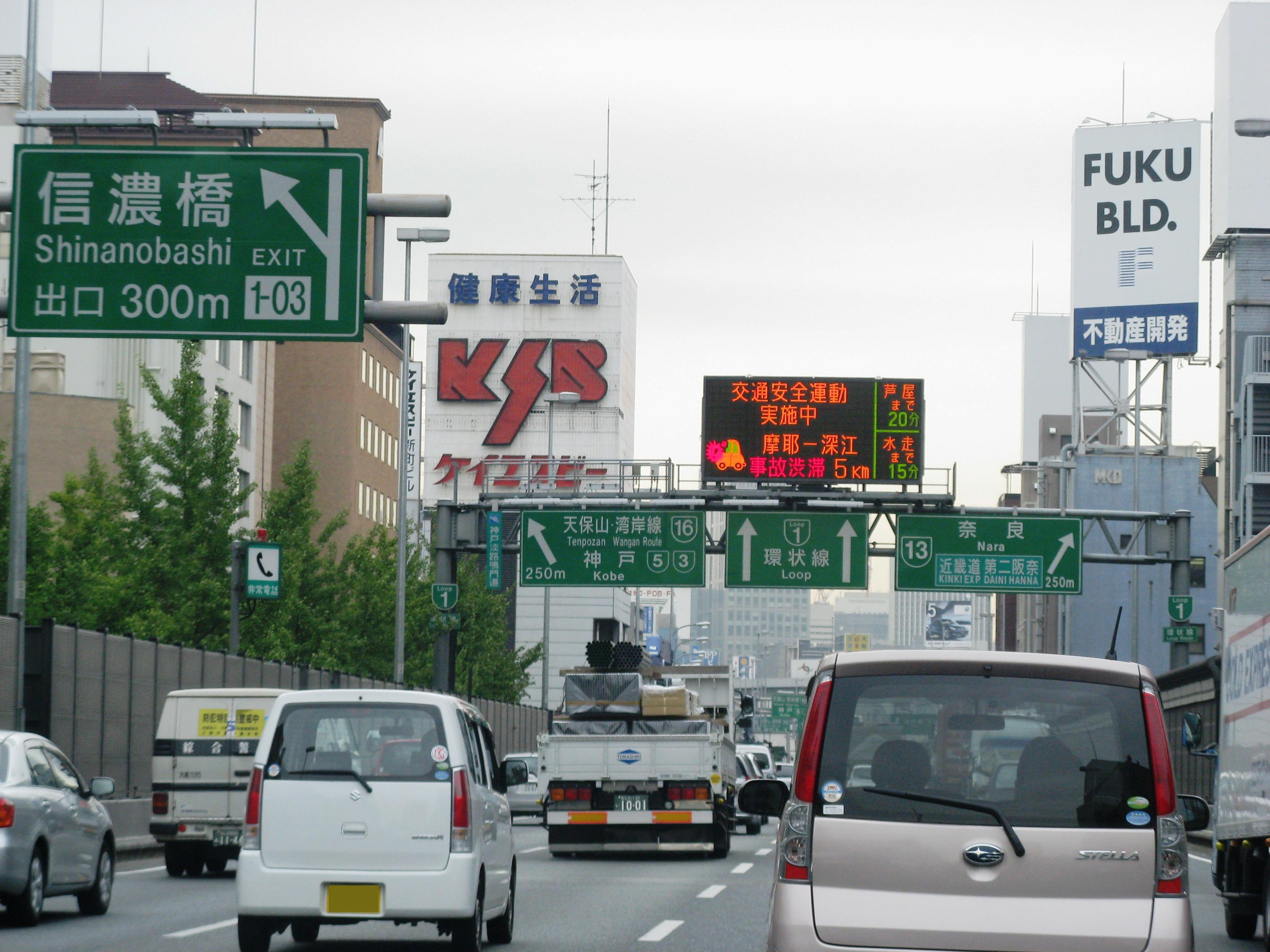
Loop Route of the Hanshin Expressway at Shinanobashi, Osaka

National, prefectural, and local roads crisscross the region.

=== Local and regional highways ===
- National Route 1
- National Route 2
- National Route 8
- National Route 9
- National Route 24 (Kyoto - Nara Prefecture - Wakayama Prefecture)
- National Route 25 (Osaka - Nara - Nagoya)
- National Route 26 (Osaka - Wakayama)
- National Route 28 (Kobe - Awaji - Tokushima, Tokushima)
- National Route 171 (Kobe - Kyoto, San'yōdō)
- National Route 423 (Osaka - Senri - Kameoka, "New-Midōsuji")

=== Expressways ===
- Hanshin Expressway
- Meishin Expressway (Asian Highway 1)
  - Shin-Meishin Expressway
- Chūgoku Expressway (Asian Highway 1)
- Sanyō Expressway
- Kinki Expressway
- Maizuru-Wakasa Expressway (to Maizuru)
- Nishi-Meihan Expressway (to Nara Prefecture, Nagoya)
- Hanwa Expressway (to Wakayama Prefecture)
- Keinawa Expressway
- Kobe-Awaji-Naruto Expressway (to Tokushima Prefecture)
- Kyoto Jūkan Expressway (to Miyazu)

== Maritime transport ==
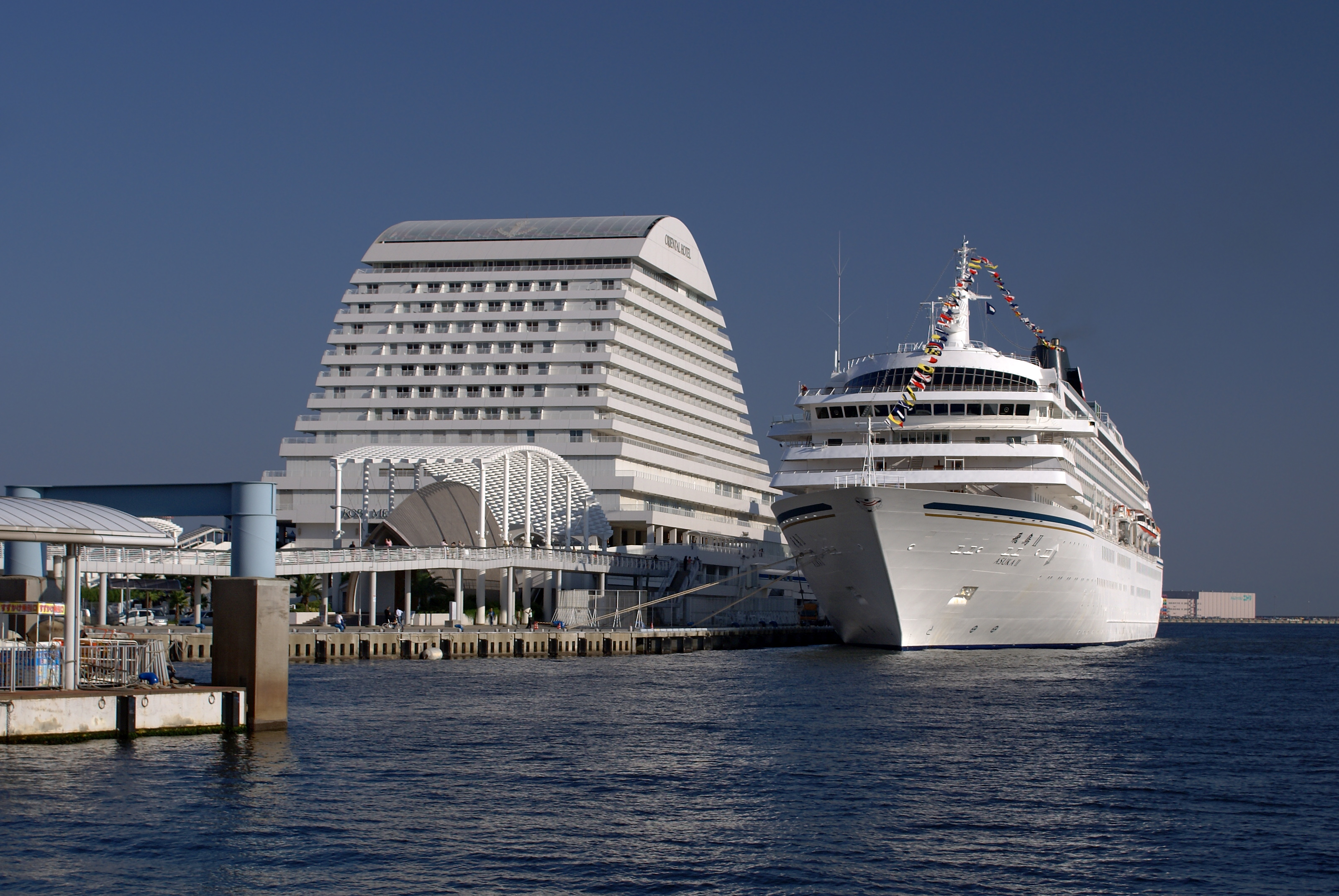
Port of Kobe

=== Passenger ferries ===
Osaka's international ferry connections are far greater than Tokyo's, mostly due to geography. There are international ferries that leave Osaka for Shanghai, Korea, and until recently Taiwan. Osaka's domestic ferry services include regular service to ports such as Shimonoseki, Kagoshima, and Okinawa.

=== Shipping ===
Shipping plays a crucial role for moving freight in and out of the Keihanshin area. Although in the 1970s the port of Kobe was the busiest in the world by containers handled, it no longer ranks among the top twenty worldwide. Kansai area is home to 5 existing LNG terminals.

- Port of Kobe
- Port of Osaka
- Port of Sakai-Senboku (In Osaka Prefecture)
- Port of Himeji

== Other modes ==
Greater Osaka is little different from the rest of Japan in the other modes of transport.

The first automated bicycle system in the region was installed at the North Exit of Nishinomiya Station (Hanshin) in 2010, capable of handling 414 bicycles.

== See also ==
- Transport in Greater Tokyo
- Transport in Greater Nagoya
- Transport in Fukuoka-Kitakyūshū
- List of urban rail systems in Japan
