= Transport in Greater Nagoya =

Overview of the transportation network in Greater Nagoya

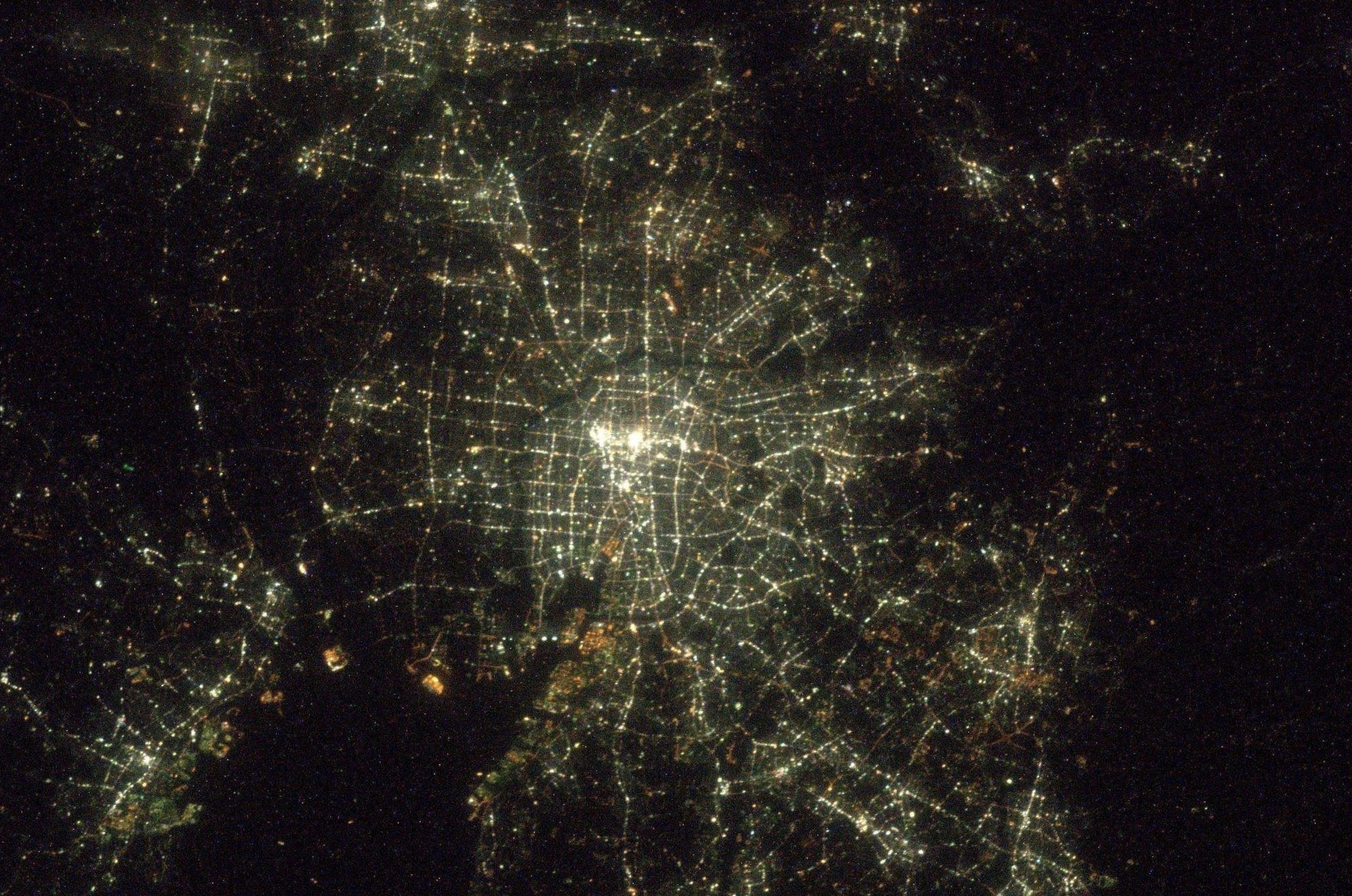
An aerial photograph of Nagoya at night

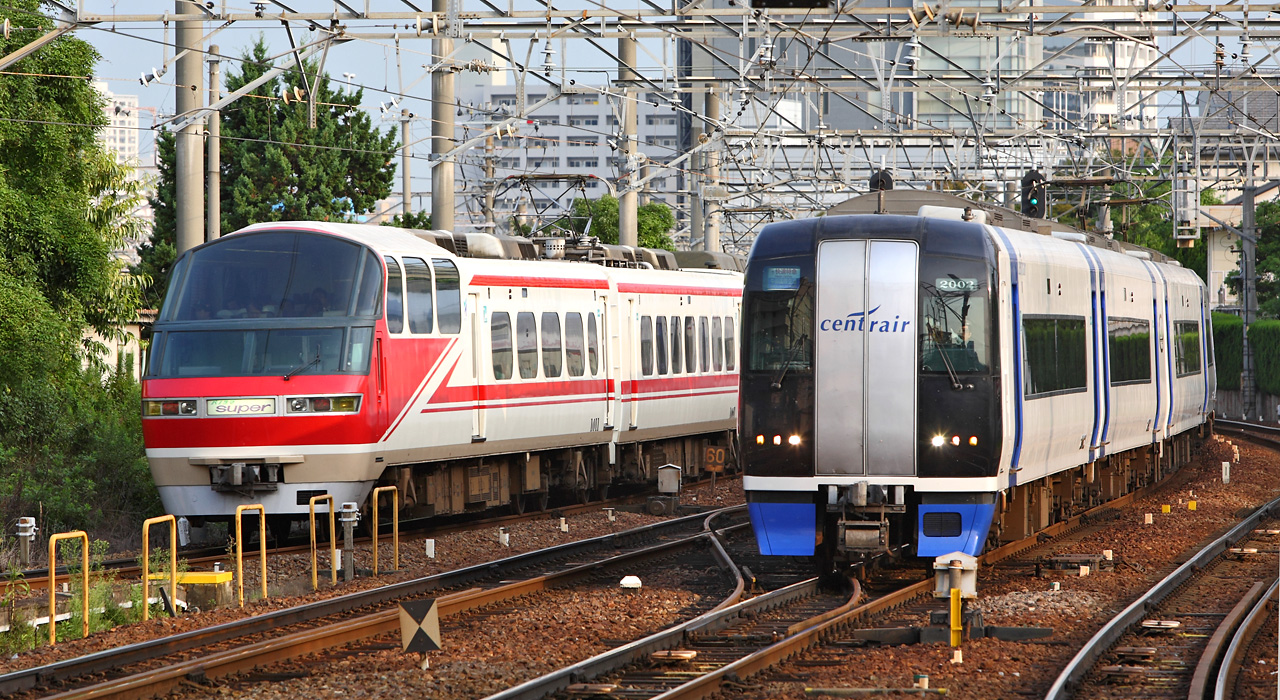
Nagoya Railroad's Panorama Cars

Transport in Greater Nagoya (Chūkyō) is similar to that of the Tokyo and Osaka, but is more automobile oriented, as the urban density is less than Japan's two primary metropolises, and major automobile manufacturers like Toyota are based here. Still, compared to most cities of its size worldwide it has a considerable rail transport network with 3 million passenger trips daily, with a similar density and extent of passenger rail to London or New York City, (as of May 2014, the article Nagoya rail list lists 59 lines, 16 operators, 1,547.8 km (961.76 mi) of operational track and 654 stations [although stations recounted for each operator], note this data does not include any high speed rail) complemented with highways and surface streets for private motor transport. It includes public and private rail and highway networks; airports for international, domestic, and general aviation; buses; motorcycle delivery services, walking, bicycling, and commercial shipping. The nexus of the public transport system is Nagoya Station. Every region of Greater Nagoya, also known as the Chūkyō Metropolitan Area (中京圏), has rail or road transport services, and the area as a whole is served by sea and air links.

Public transport within Greater Nagoya has a rather extensive public transit system, only surpassed in Japan by those of Greater Tokyo and Greater Osaka. The core of the transit network consists of 47 surface and subterranean railway lines in operation (see section Rail transport), run by numerous public and private operators; monorails, trams, fixed-guideway lines and buses support this primary rail network. Like other cities in Japan, walking and bicycling not only to destinations but to railway stations are much more common than in many cities around the globe.

Compared to Tokyo and Osaka, usage of automobiles is rather high in Greater Nagoya. In 2001, 56.3% of trips were made using cars, 10% by railway, 1% by bus, 17.8% by walking, 14.5% by two-wheelers (including delivery services).

== Air transport ==
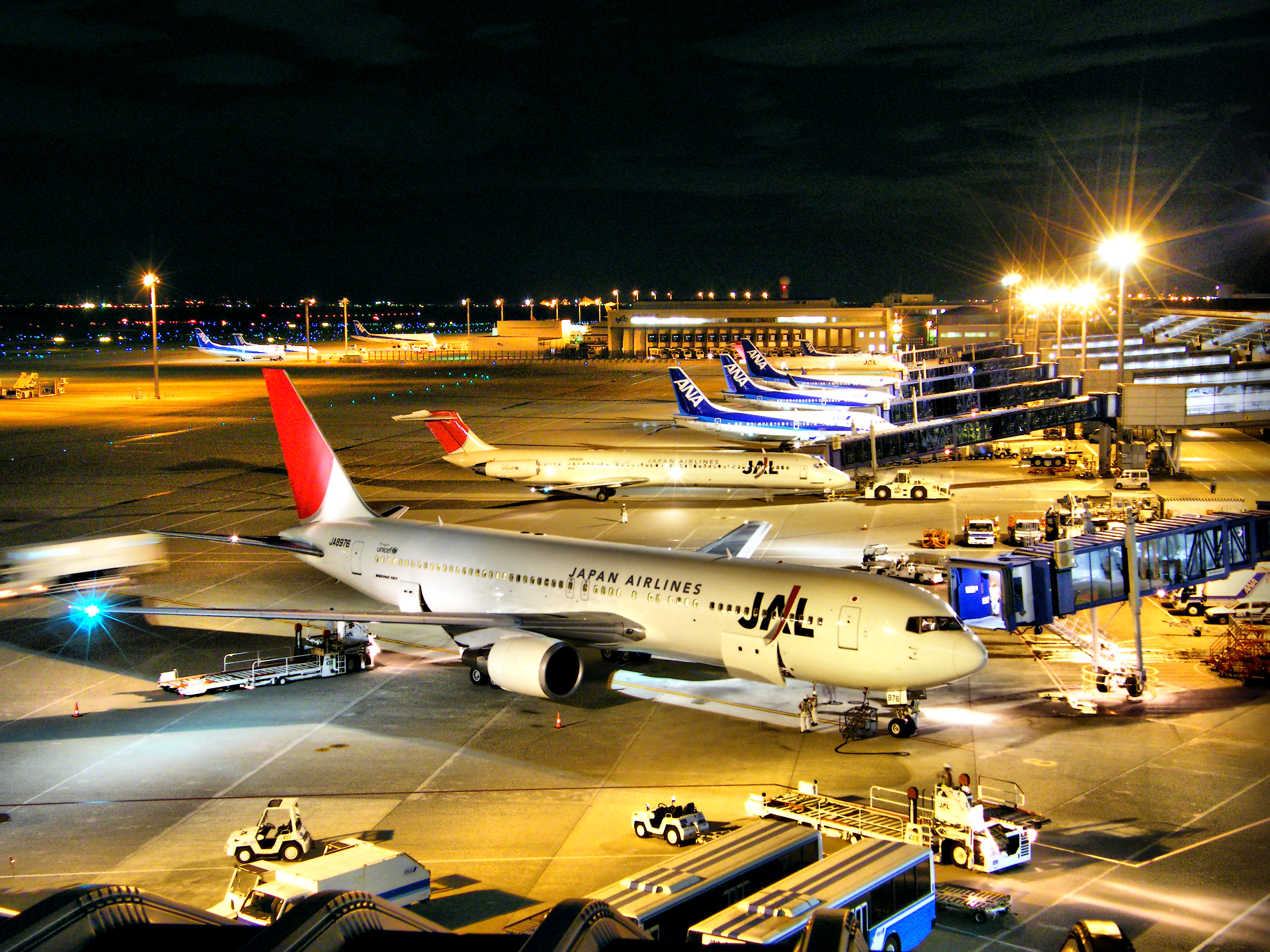
Chūbu International Airport （Centrair）

=== Airport ===
==== Primary airports ====
Until 2005, Nagoya Airfield (also known as Komaki Airport) was the area's main airport. Chūbu Centrair International Airport has since become the main domestic and international hub for the region.

==== Secondary airports ====
Nearby airports outside the region include the newly-opened Shizuoka Airport and those in Greater Osaka.

==== Military ====
There are also a number of Japan Air Self-Defense Force military airfields.

- Komaki Airport

== Rail transport ==
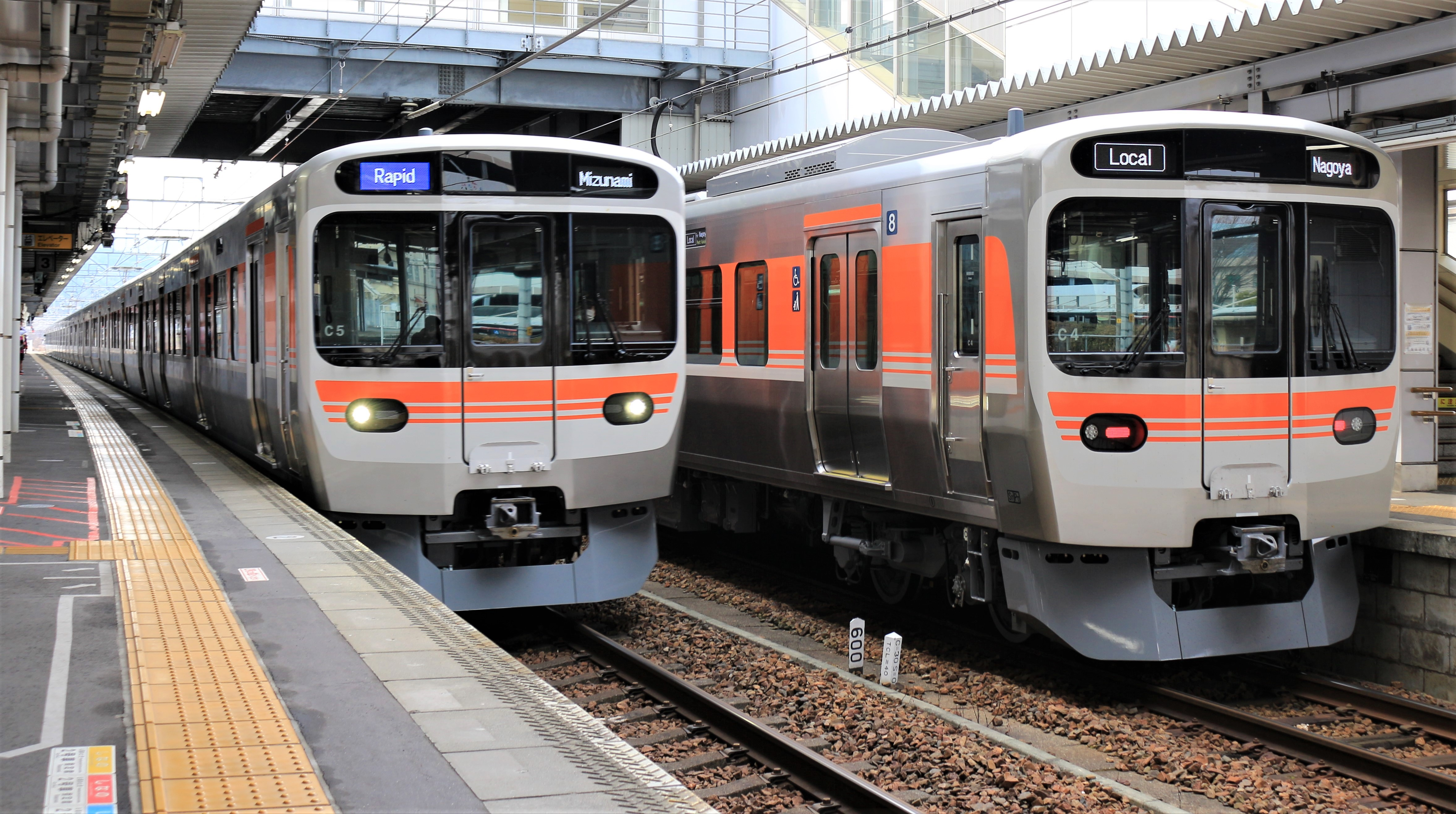
JR Chūō Main Line

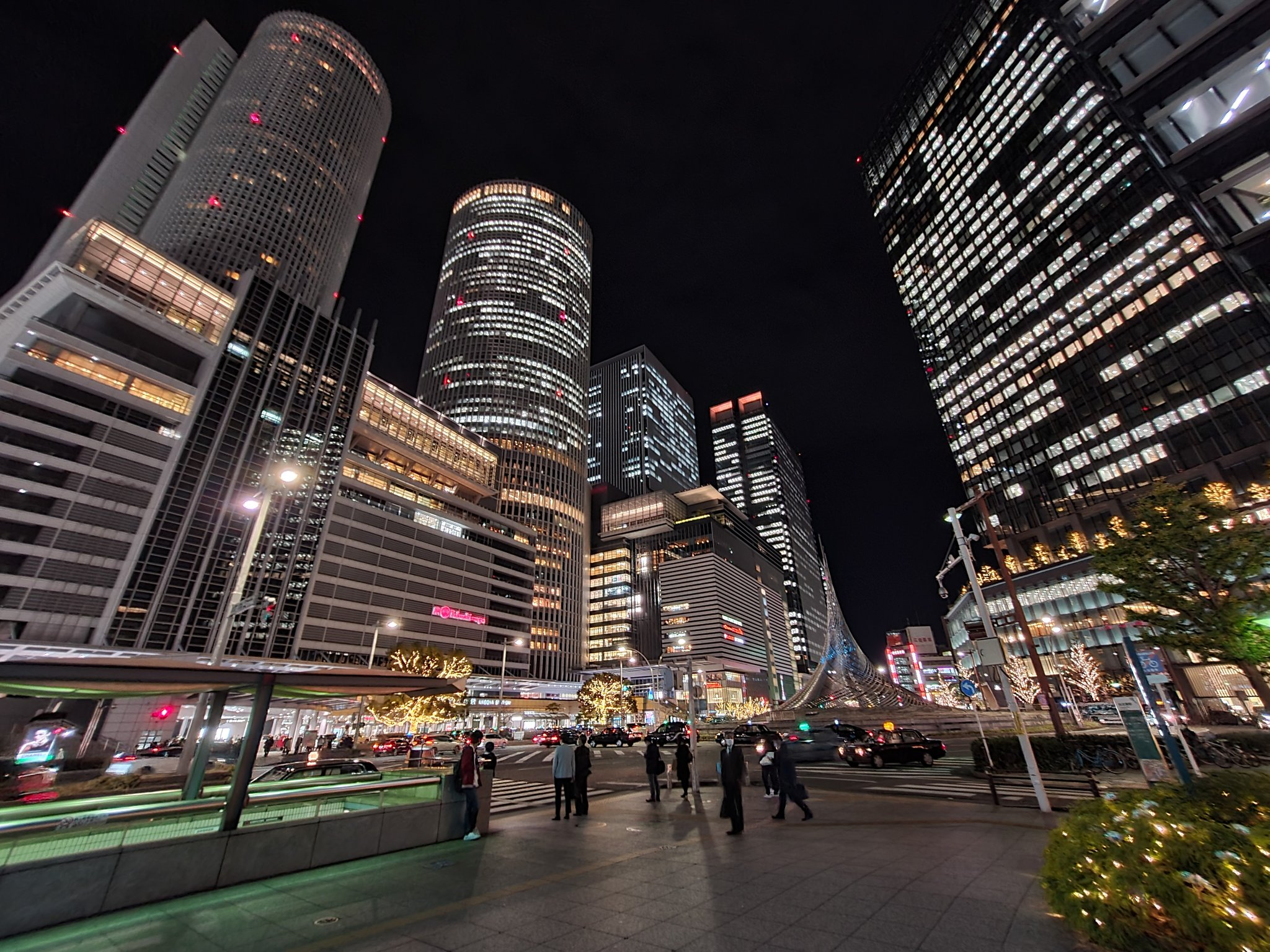
Nagoya Station

=== Overview ===
The passenger rail network in Greater Nagoya is fairly dense with 3 million passengers daily (1.095 billion annually). Passenger railway usage and density is lower than that of Greater Tokyo or Greater Osaka, as generally the trend in Japan, few free maps exist of the entire network, operators show only the stations of their respective company and key transfer points. In addition to above-ground and below-ground rail lines, the Tōkaidō Shinkansen serves as the backbone of intercity rail transport. The Chuo Shinkansen is planned to pass through Nagoya.

In the Greater Nagoya area, there are 59 operating passenger rail lines and two tourist-oriented cable car lines–the Kinkazan Ropeway and the Gozaisho Ropeway.

=== Japan Railway ===
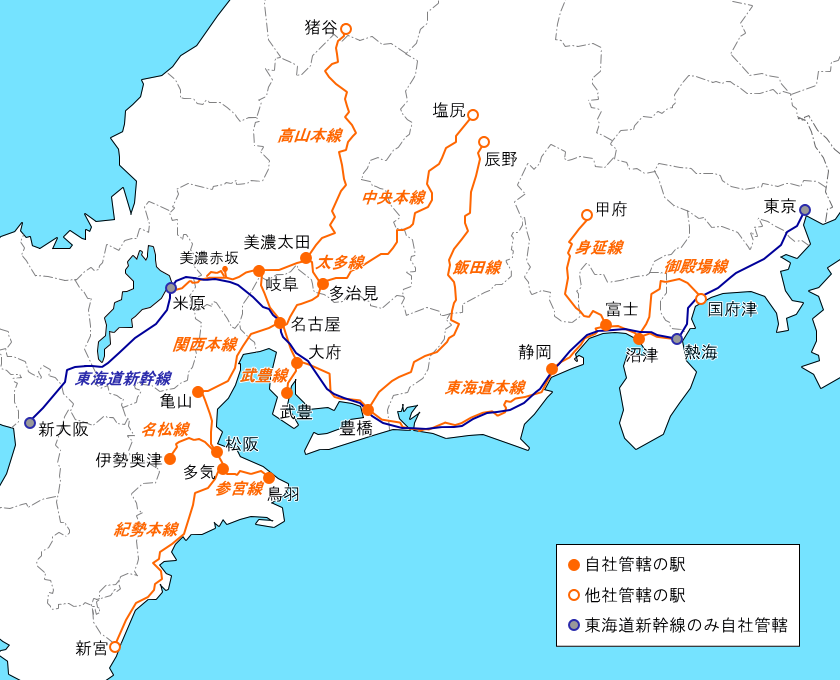
JR Central

- Central Japan Railway Company (JR Central)
  - Tōkaidō Shinkansen
  - Tōkaidō Main Line
  - Chūō Main Line
  - Kansai Main Line
  - Takayama Main Line
  - Taita Line

=== Kintetsu Railway ===
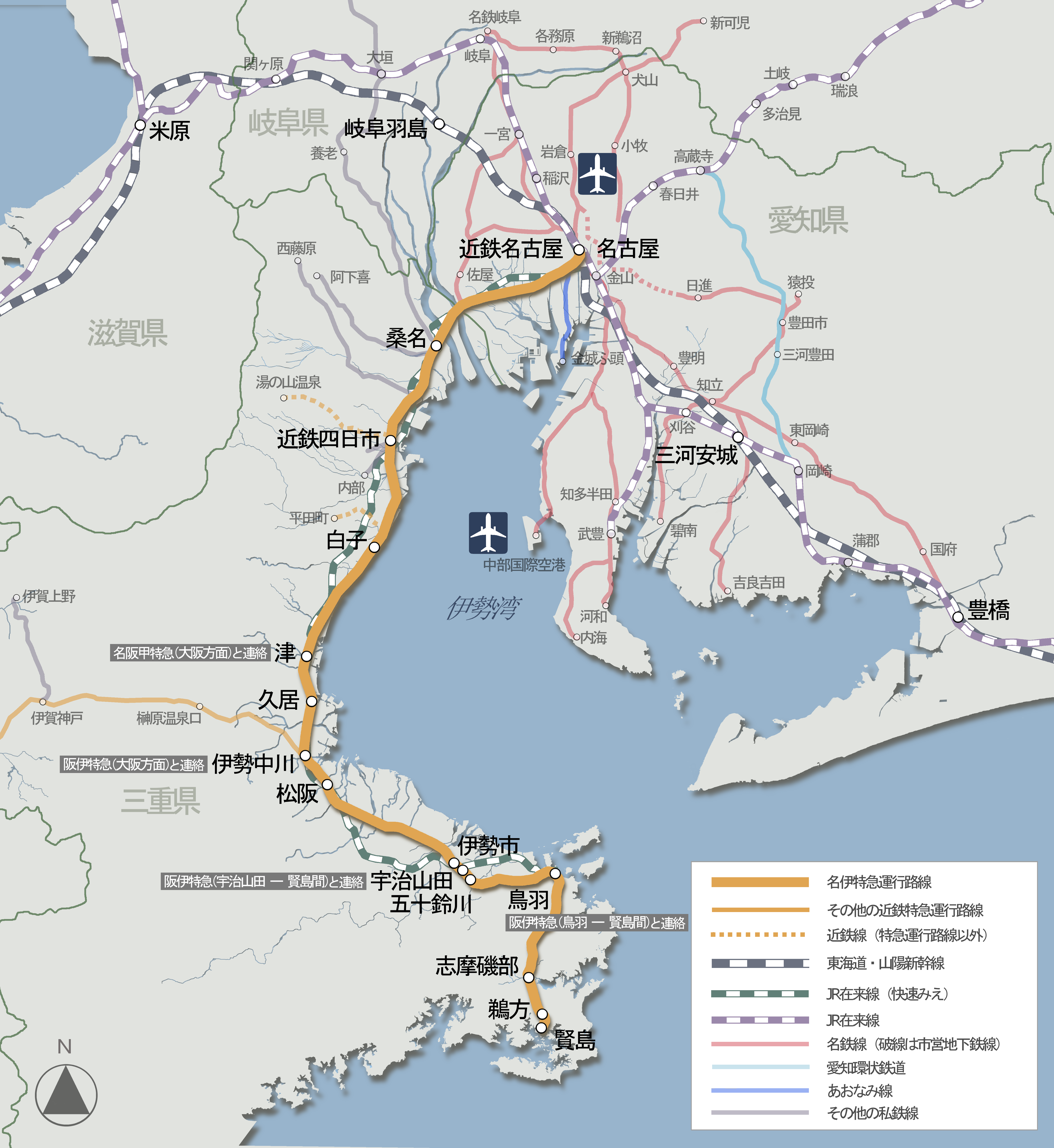
Kintetsu Railway

- Kinki Nippon Railway (Kintetsu)
  - Nagoya Line
  - Yunoyama Line
  - Suzuka Line
  - Yamada Line
  - Toba Line
  - Shima Line

=== Meitetsu Railway ===
Meitetsu Railway

- Nagoya Railroad (Meitetsu)
  - Nagoya Line
  - Hashima Line
  - Takehana Line
  - Bisai Line
  - Tsushima Line
  - Kakamigahara Line
  - Inuyama Line
  - Hiromi Line
  - Chikkō Line
  - Tokoname Line
  - Airport Line
  - Kōwa Line
  - Chita New Line
  - Toyota Line
  - Mikawa Line
  - Nishio Line
  - Gamagōri Line
  - Toyokawa Line
  - Seto Line
  - Komaki Line

=== Yokkaichi Asunarou Railway ===
- Yokkaichi Asunarou Railway
  - Hachiōji Line
  - Utsube Line

=== Subway operators ===
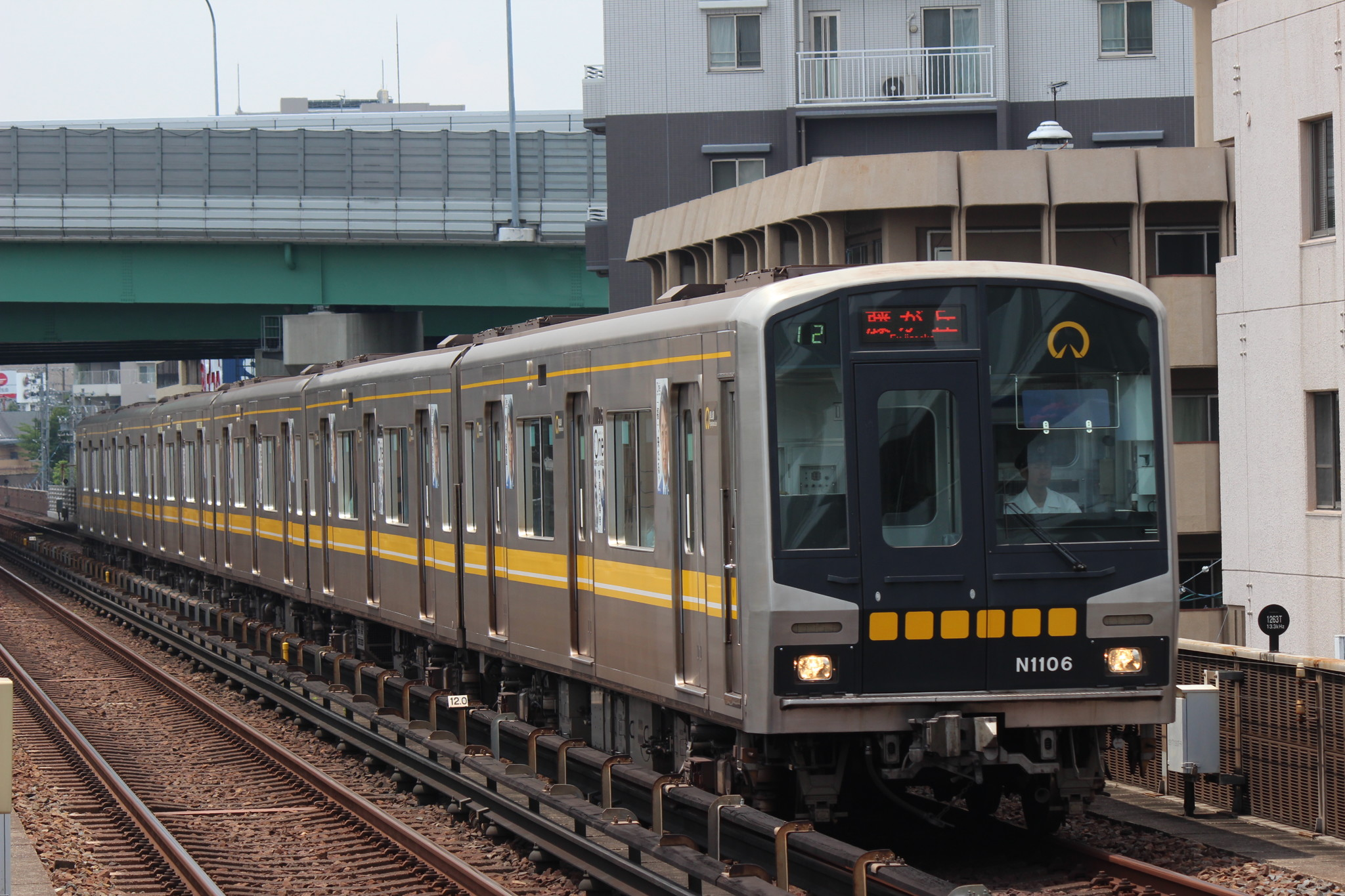
Nagoya Municipal Subway

- Nagoya Municipal Subway
  - Higashiyama Line
  - Meijō Line
  - Meikō Line
  - Tsurumai Line
  - Sakura-dōri Line
  - Kamiiida Line

=== List of passenger railway lines in operation ===
- Aichi Rapid Transit
- Nagoya Seaside Rapid Railway
- JR-Central Transport Service Company
- Aichi Loop Railway
- Ise Railway

=== List of cable car systems in operation ===
- Kinkazan Ropeway
- Gozaisho Ropeway

=== List of freight-only lines in operation ===
- Kinuura Rinkai Railway

=== Bus rapid transit ===
- Yutorito Line (Guideway Bus Shidami Line / Nagoya Guideway Bus)

== Road transport ==
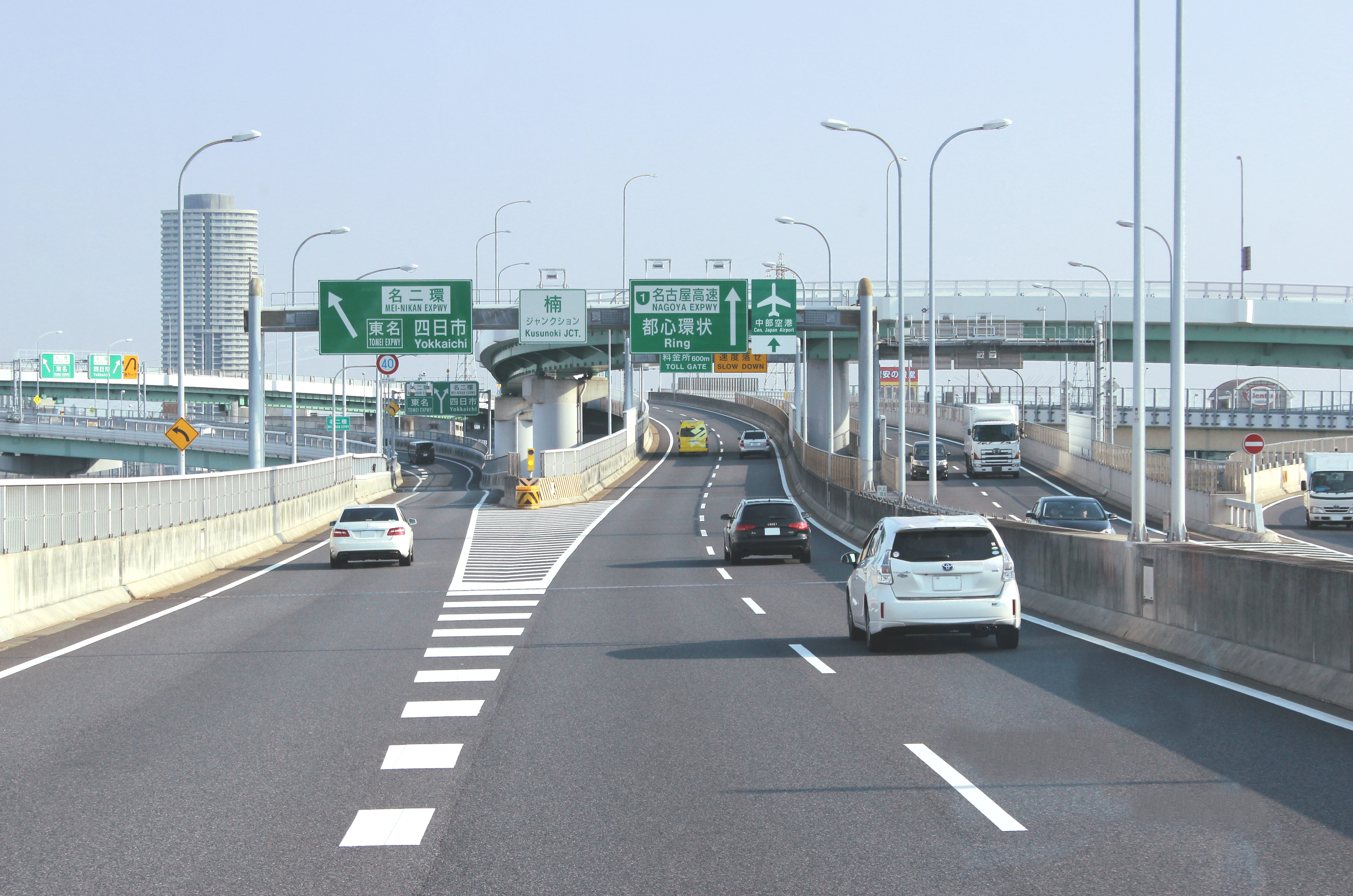
Nagoya Expressway & Mei-Nikan Expressway（Kusunoki JCT）

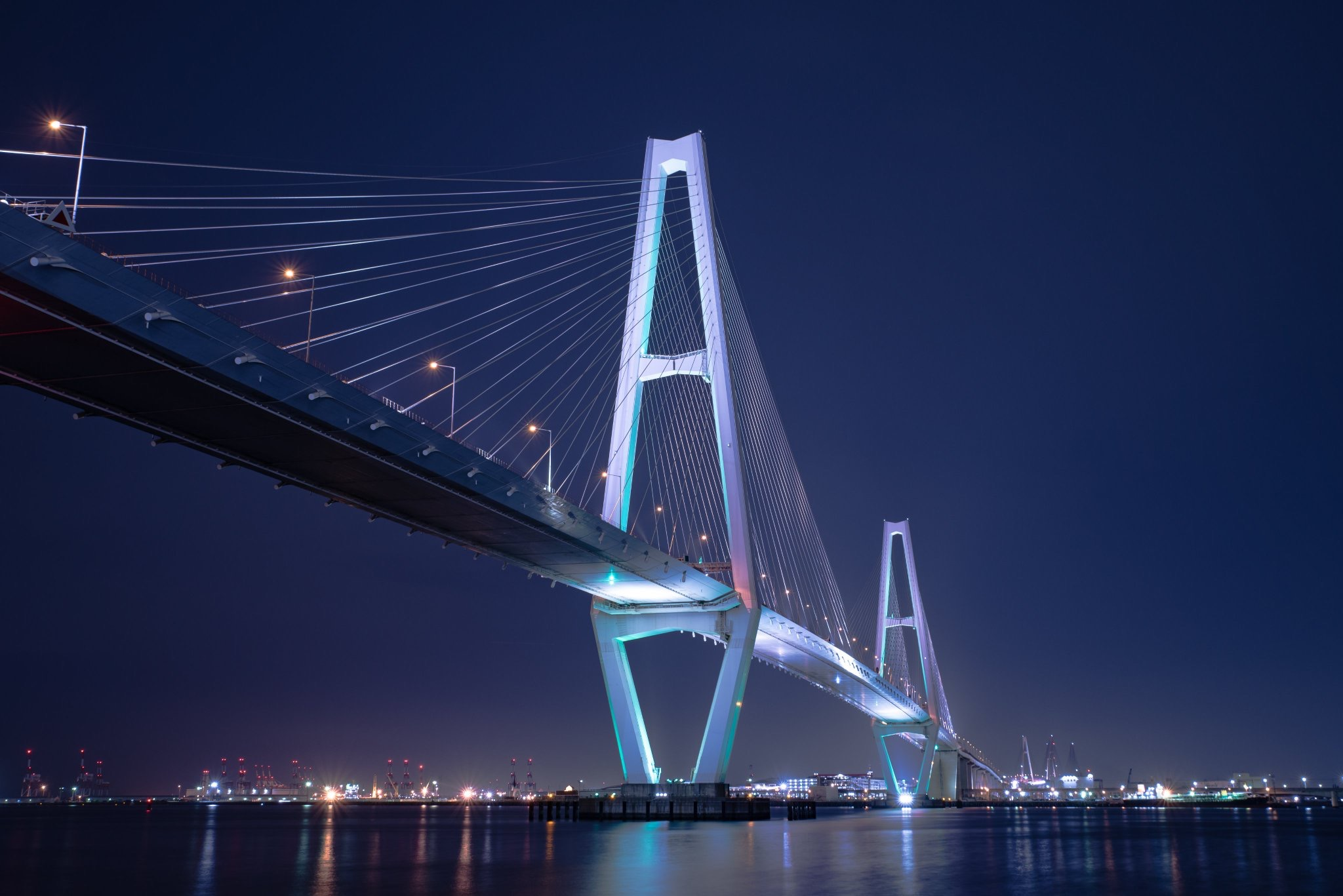
Isewangan Expressway （Meiko triton bridge）

=== Expressways ===
- Chūō Expressway
- Tōkai-Hokuriku Expressway
- Tōkai Ring Expressway
- Tomei Expressway
- Meishin Expressway
- Higashi-Meihan Expressway
- Isewangan Expressway
- New Tōmei Expressway (under construction)
- Chitahantō Road

=== Buses ===
There are numerous private and public bus companies with hundreds of routes throughout the region. Most local bus routes complement existing rail service to form an effective intermodal transit network.

Like those in other major cities, an extensive network of intercity buses spreads out across the country from Nagoya.

=== Private/commercial autos ===
The number of registered autos in Aichi in 2014 was close to 5 million out of 7.5 million people. In contrast, suburban Tokyo's Saitama prefecture has 7.3 million people, but a million fewer registered autos. Kei car percentage was similar between the two. Like all of Japan, the transition to kei cars is increasing year by year.

== Maritime transport ==
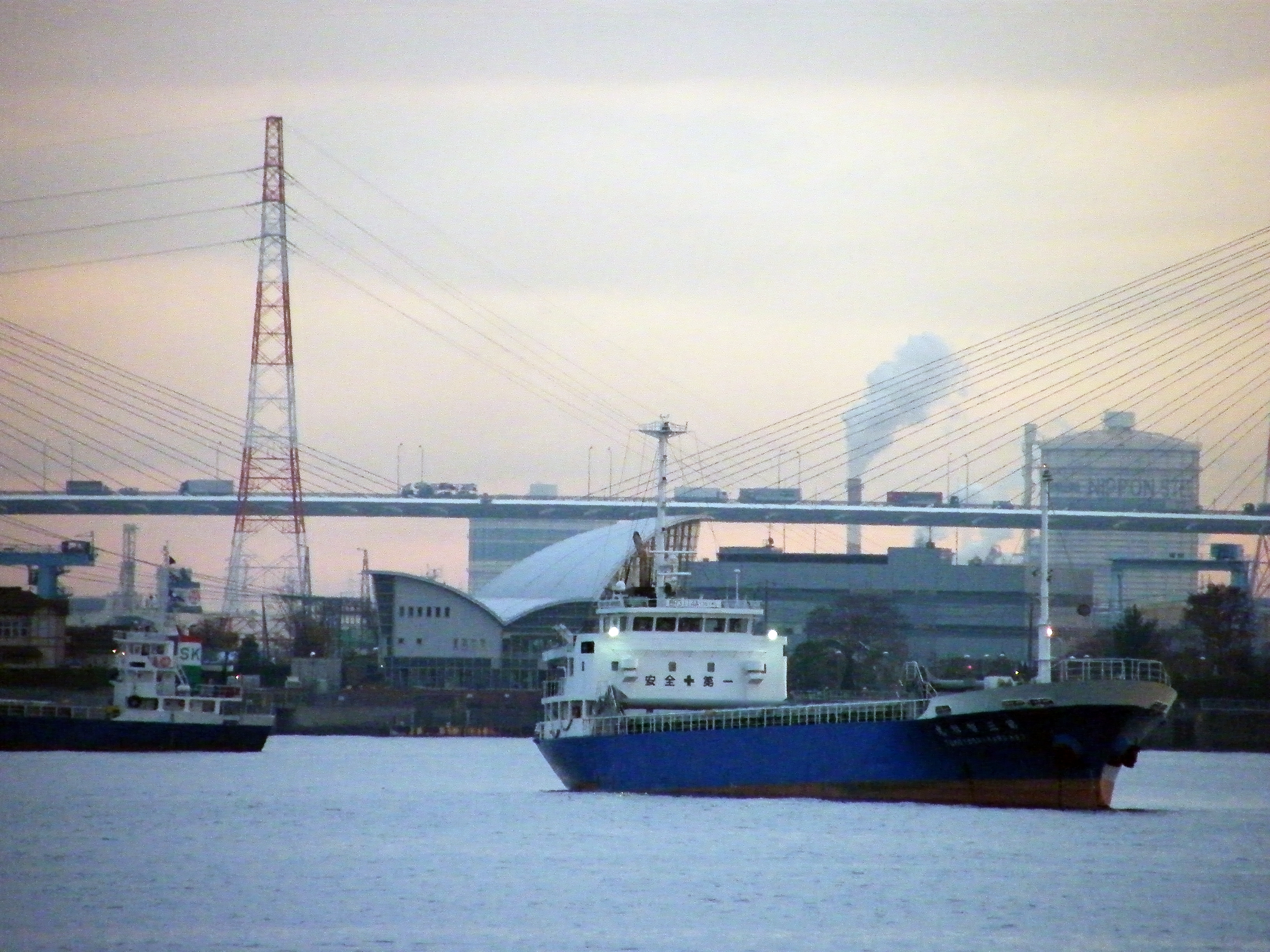
Port of Nagoya

=== Seaport ===
Major area seaports include:

- Port of Kinuura
- Port of Nagoya
- Port of Mikawa (Toyohashi Port)
- Port of Yokkaichi

=== Passenger ferries ===
- Nagoya's international ferry connections are not so extensive, however domestically it is served by Taiheiyō Ferry for Sendai and Tomakomai. Some routes between Tokyo and Osaka make stops at Nagoya.
- Ise-wan Ferry plys commuter routes between the Aichi side and Mie side.

=== Shipping ===
Shipping plays a crucial role for moving freight in and out of the Greater Nagoya area, with finished automobiles for export are handled by ports in the region. However, with the just-in-time requirements of automobile manufacturers and suppliers regional airports also handle much cargo.

Greater Nagoya is home to six existing regasification LNG terminals.

== Other modes ==
Greater Nagoya is little different from the rest of Japan in the other modes of transport.

== See also ==
- List of urban rail systems in Japan
- Transport in Greater Tokyo
- Transport in Keihanshin
- Transport in Fukuoka-Kitakyūshū
