= E69 =

E69 may refer to:

- European route E69
- King's Indian Defense, Encyclopaedia of Chess Openings code
- Shin-Tomei Expressway (Inasa Spur road) and San-en Nanshin Expressway, route E69 in Japan
