= Ebina Junction =

Road junction in Ebina, Kanagawa prefecture, Japan

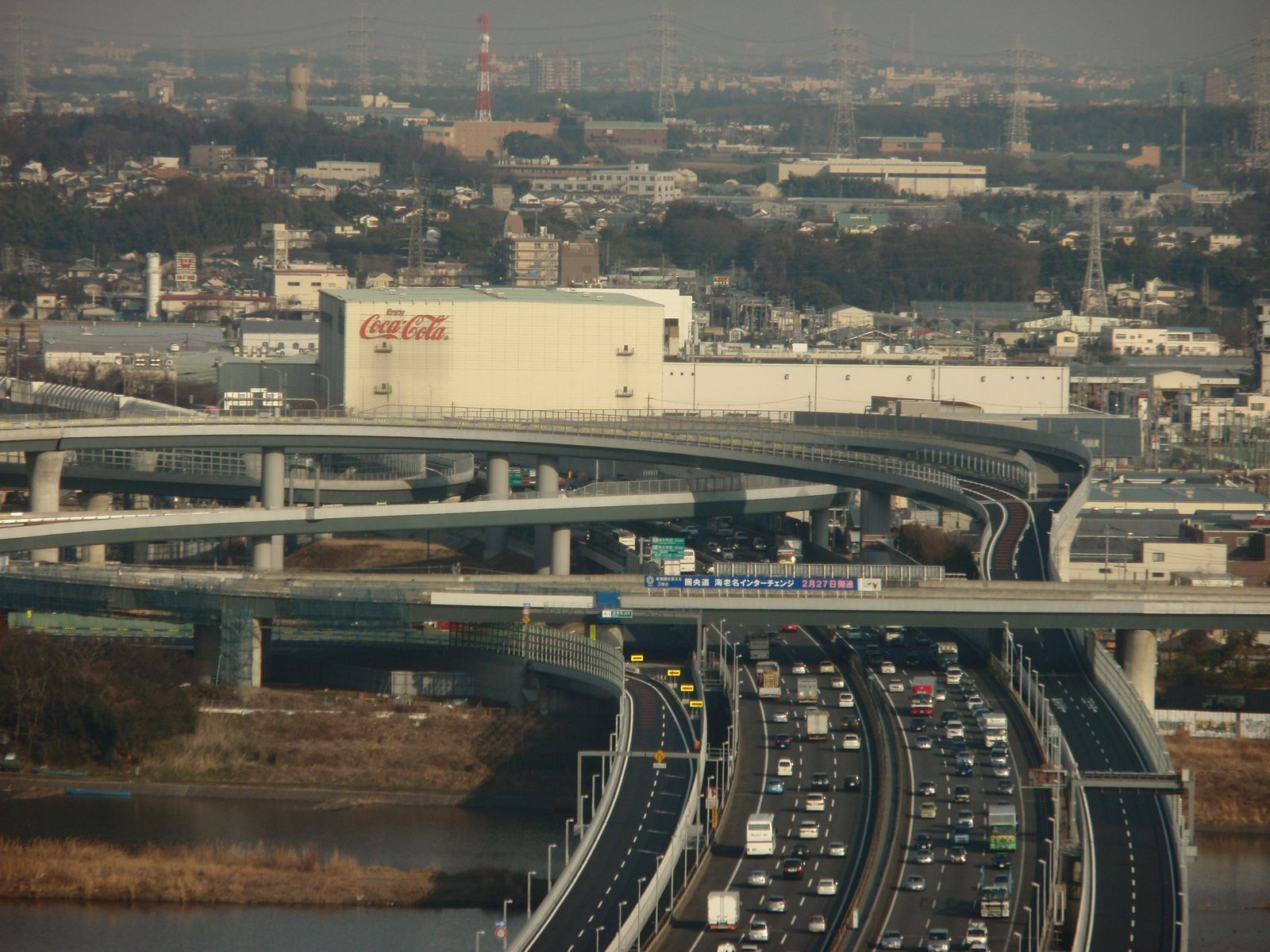
- Interactive map of Ebina Junction

Location
- Ebina, Kanagawa, Japan
- Coordinates: 35°25′21″N 139°22′40″E
- Roads at junction: Tōmei Expressway / Ken-Ō Expressway

Construction
- Type: {{{type}}}

Ebina Junction (海老名ジャンクション, Ebina Jankushon) is a junction that connects the Tōmei Expressway and the Ken-Ō Expressway in the town of Ebina, Kanagawa Prefecture, Japan. Initially, it was tentatively called Ebina Kita Junction (海老名北JCT), but the official name was announced on May 18, 2009. It is located near Shake Station on the Sagami Line.
