= Ashigara Service Area =

Rest area in Shizuoka prefecture, Japan

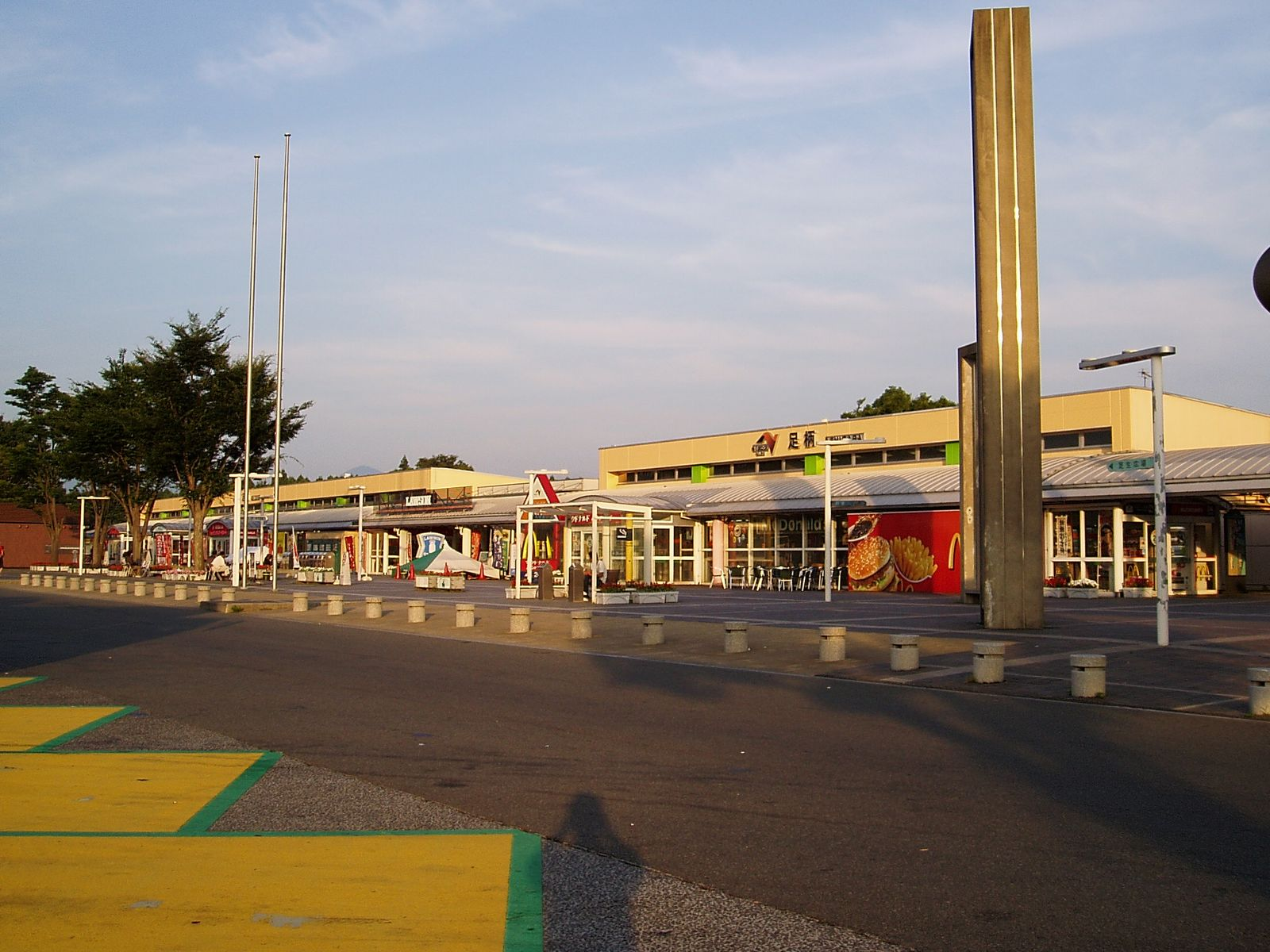

- Location within Shizuoka Prefecture

Information
- Native name: 足柄サービスエリア
- Location: Gotemba and Oyama, Shizuoka Prefecture
- Coordinates: 35°18′50.73″N 138°57′56.25″E
- Date opened: May 26, 1969

The Ashigara Service Area (足柄サービスエリア, Ashigara Sābisueria) is a rest area located on the Tōmei Expressway between Gotemba and Oyama, in Shizuoka Prefecture. It has a smart interchange.

When entering this service area from the down line, it is necessary to use the climbing lane.

== Facility ==
The Ashigara Service Area reopened on November 25, 2010. It is nicknamed "EXPASA Ashigara".

In this renewal, it aims to create a commercial complex with the aim of creating a new style of service area that will qualitatively transform from a "transit service area" to a "stay service area". Ashigara SA (up line) is a famous store "Yonehachi" that has 7 restaurants such as a restaurant overlooking Mount Fuji, a souvenir shop with Hakone / Izu confectionery and sweets, and a department store basement. ) "Kakijiro" and other 5 retail stores have been partially reopened. Ashigara SA (down line) has partially reopened 4 restaurants and 4 retail stores, and the first dog cafe "huladog" on the expressway SA has opened (currently closed).

=== Ashigara Smart Interchange ===
The Ashigara Smart Interchange is a smart Interchange located in the Ashigara Service Area.

It was newly commercialized by the Ministry of Land, Infrastructure, Transport and Tourism on May 27, 2016. The service started on March 9, 2019. It is available 24 hours a day for all ETC-equipped models. Both the upper and lower lines are accessible.
