= Sagami Kokubun-ji =

Buddhist temple in Kanagawa, Japan

- 相模国分寺
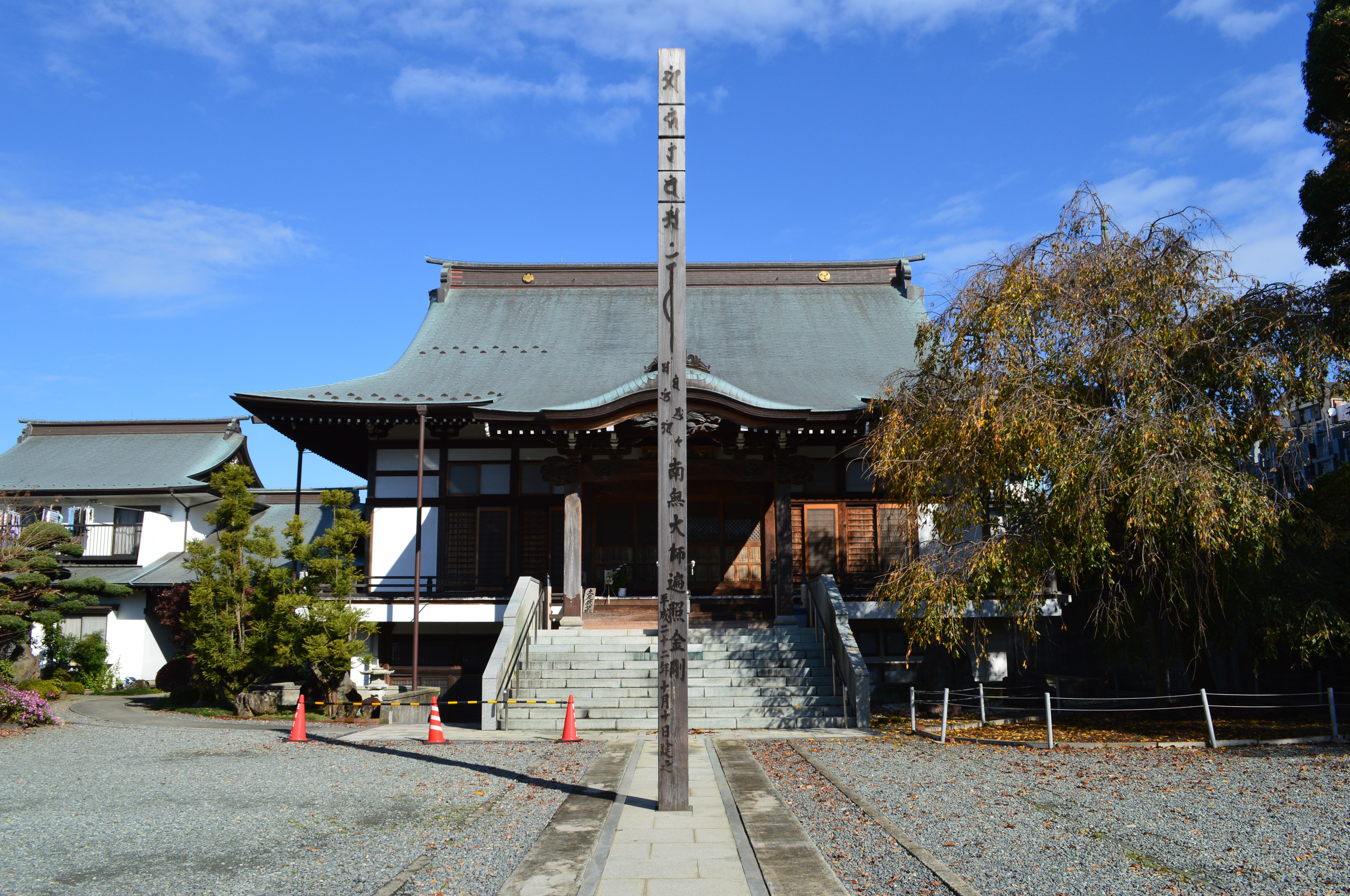
- Sagami Kokubun-ji Hondo

- Location within Kanagawa Prefecture Location within Japan

Religion
- Affiliation: Buddhist
- Deity: Yakushi Nyōrai
- Rite: Kōyasan Shingon-shū
- Status: active

Location
- Location: 1-chōme-25-38 Kokubuminami Ebina-shi, Kanagawa-ken 243-0405
- Country: Japan
- Coordinates: 35°27′16″N 139°23′52″E

Architecture
- Founder: Emperor Shōmu
- Completed: 741

Website
- Official website (in Japanese)
- National Historic Site of Japan National Important Cultural Property

The Sagami Kokubun-ji (相模国分寺) is a Buddhist temple located in the city of Ebina, Kanagawa, Japan. It belongs to the Kōyasan Shingon-shū sect, and its honzon is a statue of Yakushi Nyōrai. It is the provincial temple ("kokubunji") of former Sagami Province. The grounds of the temple are a National Historic Site. and its Kamakura period Bonshō is an Important Cultural Property. The temple was destroyed and rebuilt several times over its long history, and much of its documentary history has been lost.

== Historyi ==
The Shoku Nihongi records that in 741, as the country recovered from a major smallpox epidemic, Emperor Shōmu ordered that a monastery and nunnery be established in every province, the kokubunji (国分寺). These temples were built to a semi-standardized template, and served both to spread Buddhist orthodoxy to the provinces, and to emphasize the power of the Nara period centralized government under the Ritsuryō system.

The origins of the Sagami Kokubun-ji are a mystery, as it is located a considerable distance from the provincial capital of Sagami, which was at Kōzu, As the temple follows a layout patterned after Hōryū-ji, which predates the semi-standardized kokubunji format, it was long speculated that this was an existing temple which had been converted into a kokubunji. However, there is no archaeological evidence to support this hypothesis. Another theory was that the original kokubunji was located near Odawara, where a large, ruined temple complex has been discovered (the Chiyo temple ruins), and was late relocated to Ebina. However, the roof tiles excavated from the Sagami Kokubun-ji site date from the middle of the 8th century, which corresponds to the construction period ordered by Emperor Shōmu. Another theory is that the temple was built at the original location of the provincial capital, which was later re-located. The Sagami Kokubun-ji and the Sagami ichinomiya are located in Kōza District, so it is possible that the Sagami provincial capital (whose exact location has not yet been positively identified) was also located in this area. Although there is still no consensus as to why the Sagami Kokubun-ji appears to have been built unusually far from the provincial, but one theory is that it was because the Mibu clan, who were involved in the construction of many temples in the Kantō region, had their base in Kōza.

Per the Ruijū Kokushi, the temple was destroyed by a fire in 819, and suffered considerable damage and burned during again in 878 after a large earthquake. Per the Nihon Sandai Jitsuroku, it was rebuilt in 881 and it is mentioned in the Nihon Kiryaku in 940; however, there is no archaeological evidence indicating that it was actually rebuilt after the 878 earthquake, so it may have been relocated to another site which has yet to be discovered. One possible location is the Uenodai temple ruins, which was located on a hill on the southeast side of the site of the Sagami Kokubun-ji. The name "Sagami Kokubun-ji" reappears in the historical record in 1008, when it was listed in an inventory of the governor of Sagami Province, Taira no Takayoshi, and again in 1139, when Emperor Sutoku authorized it as a chokugan-ji to pray for the well-being of the nation. It was rebuilt in 1186 by Minamoto no Yoritomo and the Azuma Kagami records that Hōjō Masako sent a donation of horses in 1192 to pray for safe childbirth. After the Kamakura period, the temple disappears from history again for long periods, and by the start of the Edo period was reduced to a small Yakushi-dō chapel located on the Uenodai hill. This chapel was rebuilt on the site of the original Sagami Kokubun-ji in 1713, but was destroyed in a fire in 1910. This was rebuilt in 1910, 1974 and again in 1994. In the Edo period, during the Kanbun era, a fundraising campaign was held to build a sutra repository, which was eventually built. In 1713, the main hall was rebuilt next to the Yakushi-dō.

=== Current Situation ===
The current Sagami Kokubun-ji has a Kondō, a guest hall, and a bell tower. According to the temple legend, the principal image Yakushi Nyorai is attributed to Gyōki, but it is clearly a Muromachi period work. The only other important historical relic at the temple is its bonshō, with an engraving that it was donated to the Kokubun-niji nunnery by "Kokubun Jirō Minamoto no Yorisato" and is the work of Mononobe Kunimitsu. This Mononobe Kunimitsu is the master craftsman who cast the National Treasure bell at Engaku-ji in Kamakura. The Kokubun clan who donated the temple was a cadet branch of the Ebina clan, who were in turn a cadet branch of the Minamoto clan.

In 1921, the temple was the first kokubunji site to receive National Historic Site designation. The site was extensively excavated from 1986 to 1991, and again from 2003 to 2006, and its ruins are now preserved as part of the Sagami Kokubunji Temple Ruins Historical Park.

== Cultural Properties ==
=== National Important Cultural Properties ===
- Bonshō (梵鐘), Kamakura period (1292)

== Sagami Kokubun-ji ruins ==
The ruins are located about 100 meters northwest of the current Sagami Kokubun-ji temple precincts. The original temple area is estimated to be 240 meters east-to-west and 300 meters north-to-south, with moats and an earthen rampart. It surrounded a cloister measuring 160 meters east-to-west and 120 meters north-to-south, with the central gate in the south, a Kondō on the east, and a Seven-Story Pagoda on the west. The Lecture Hall and the central gate are connected by a rectangular corridor, and on the north side of the Lecture Hall, a monk's residences and a group of buildings that are believed to have been responsible for the management and operation of the temple.

The pagoda foundations are 29 meters square, created using the tamped earth method, in which clay-like brown soil and black soil were alternately tamped down. When the tamped earth in the excavated area reached the ground surface, a foundation base 20.4 meters on each side and 1.35 meters high was created, also made of tamped earth. It is believed that 16 large foundation stones, each weighing several tons to 10 tons, were placed on this foundation, and a seven-story pagoda measuring 10.7 meters on each side and approximately 65 meters high was built on top of it. The foundation stones are huge tuff boulders, and due to their material and size, they were most likely brought from the Hanbara area of Nakatsugawa. The foundation was originally covered with cut tuff stones, and stairs were built on the south and north sides of the pagoda, but the pagoda was rebuilt, and the foundation was made of boulders instead of cut stones, and the stairs are only on the south side.

The foundations of the Kondō are located on the east side of the pagoda, and was made using the same tamped earth method. The foundations of the Lecture Hall are located to the north of the midpoint between the pagoda and the Kondō. The building was built on a platform that was also made using the tamped earth construction method. The remains of a bell tower have also been discovered to the northwest of the pagoda, and a building that appears to be the remains of a sutra repository has also been discovered to the north of the Kondō.

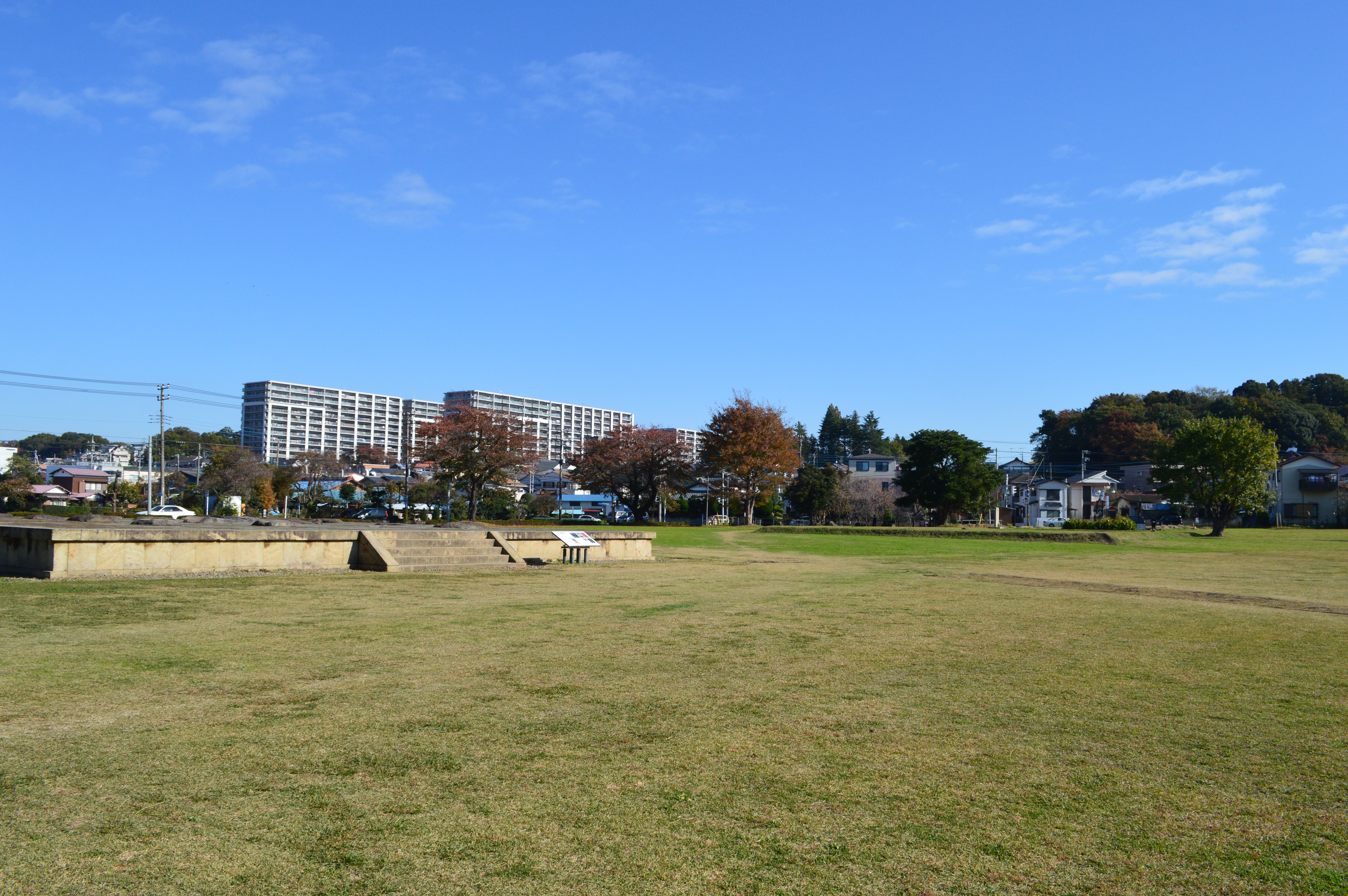
Panoramic view

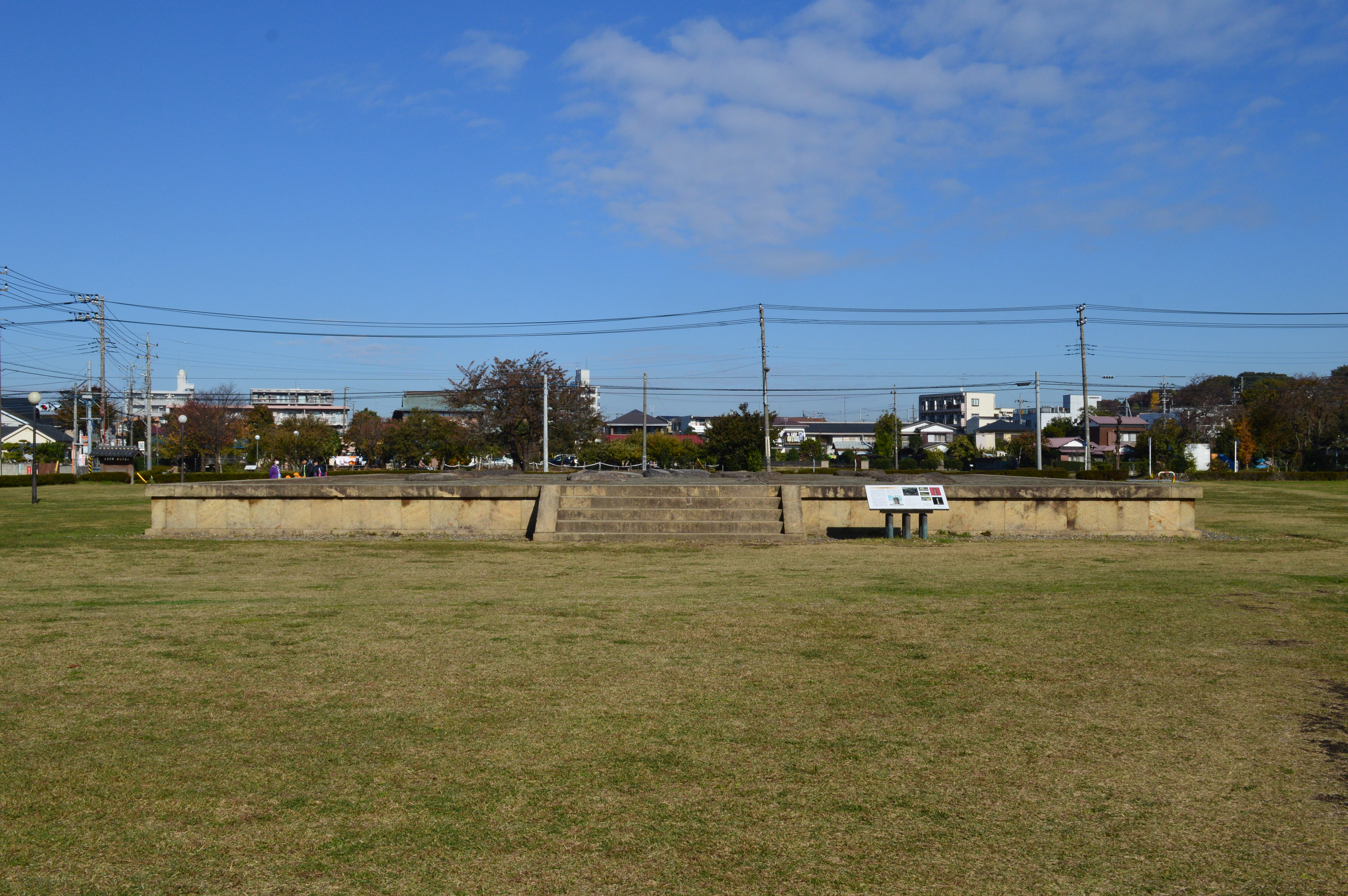
site of the pagoda

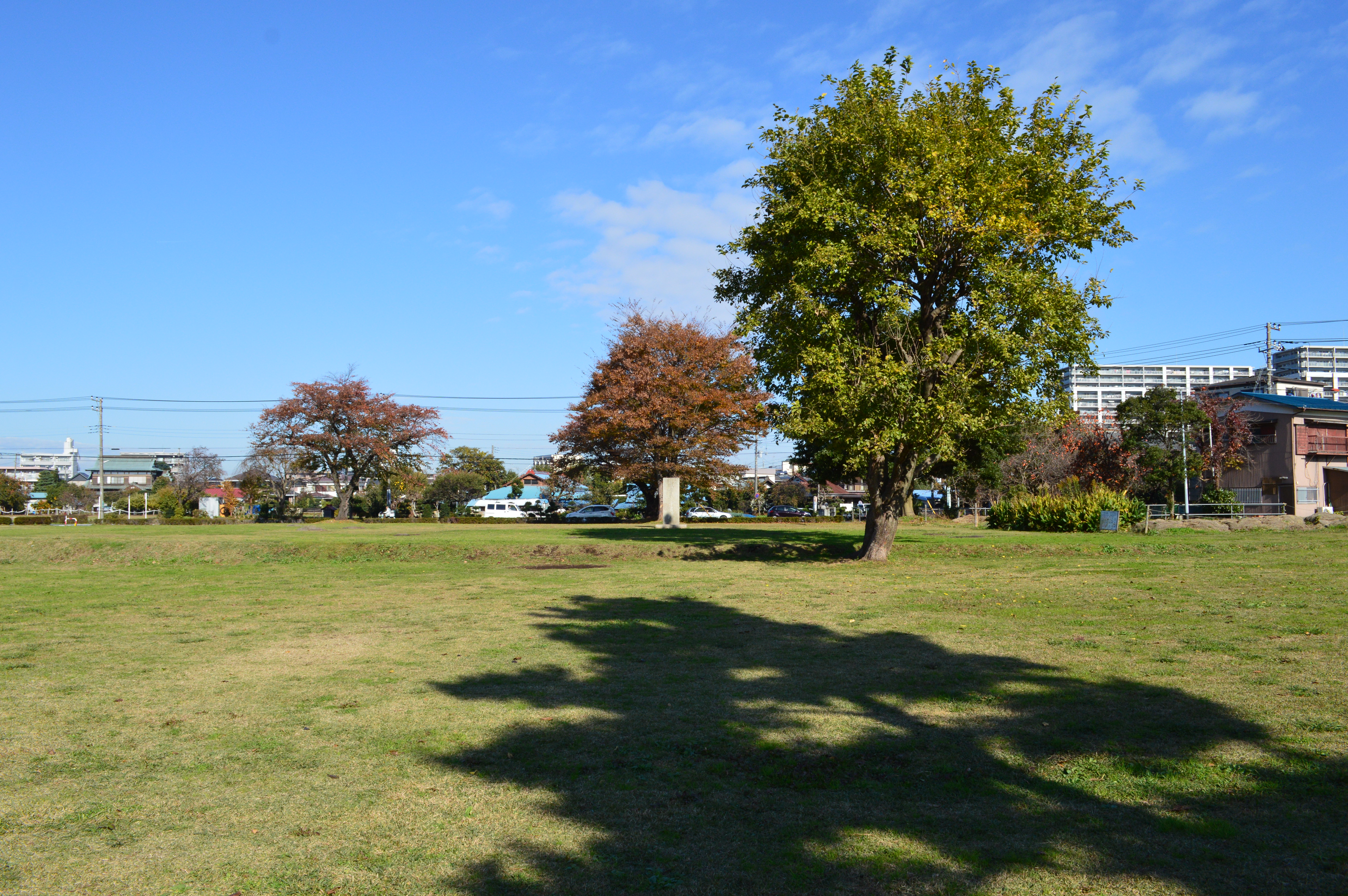
site of the Kondō

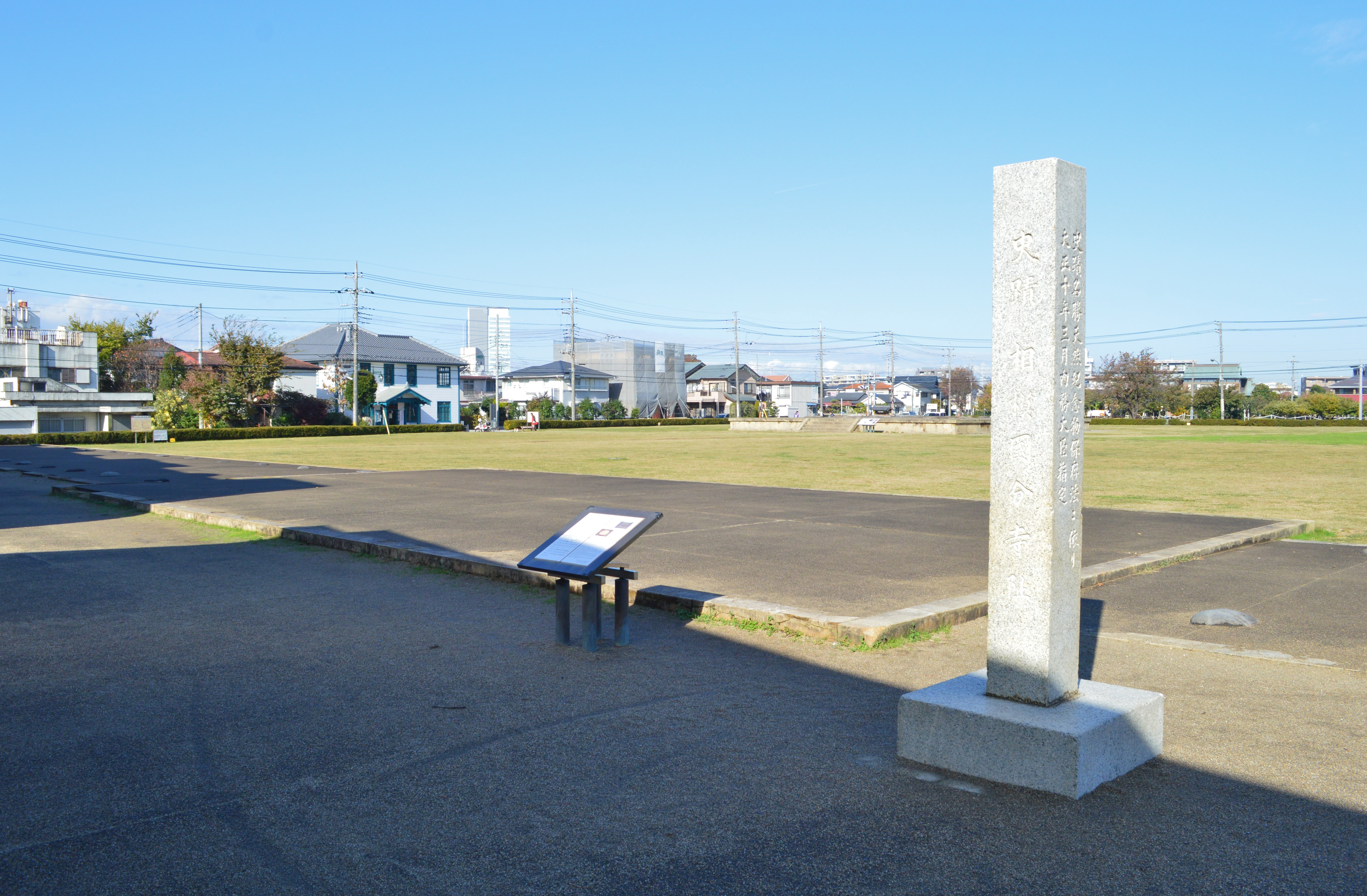
side of the Middle Gate

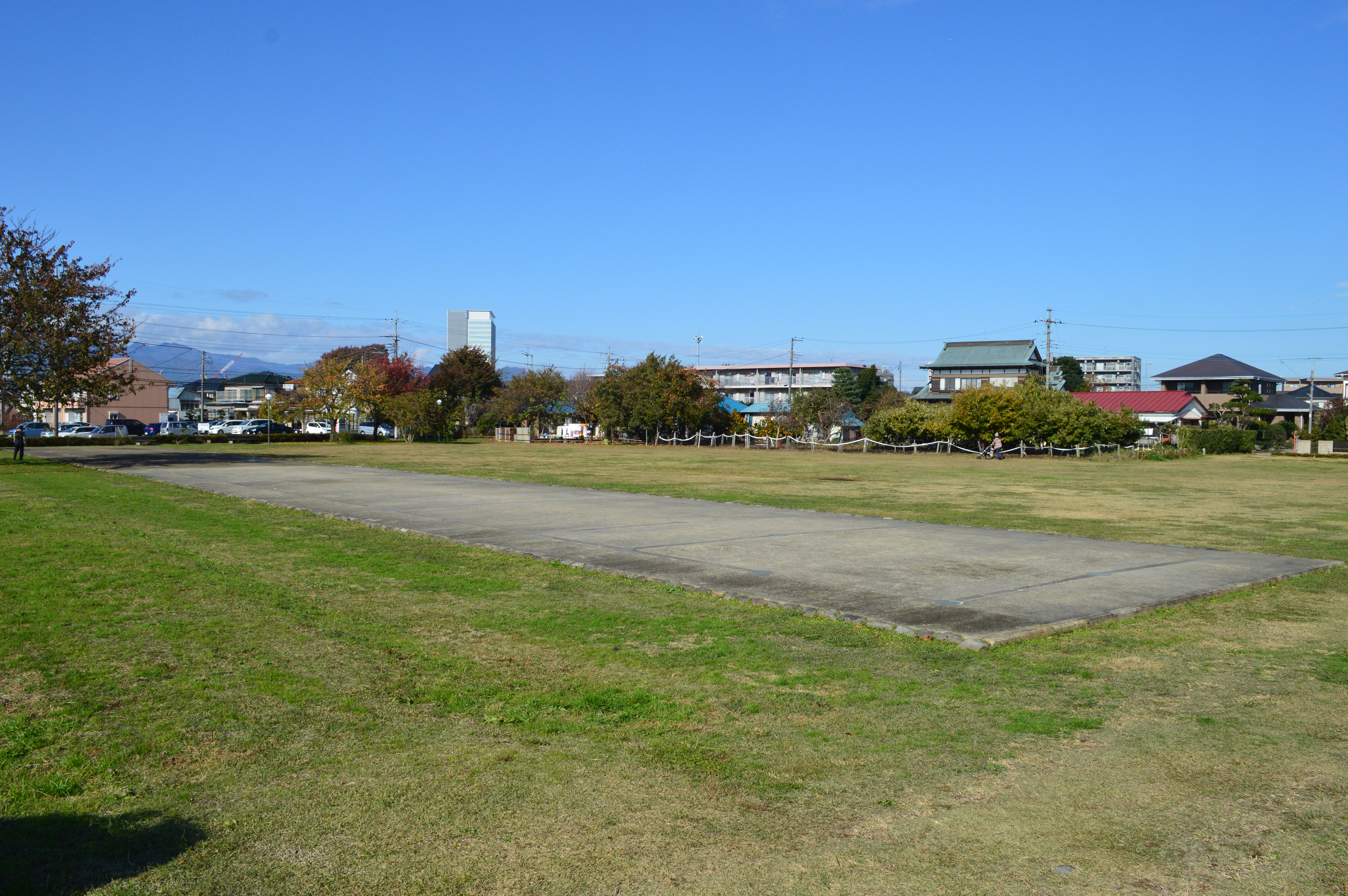
Site of the Monk's dormitory

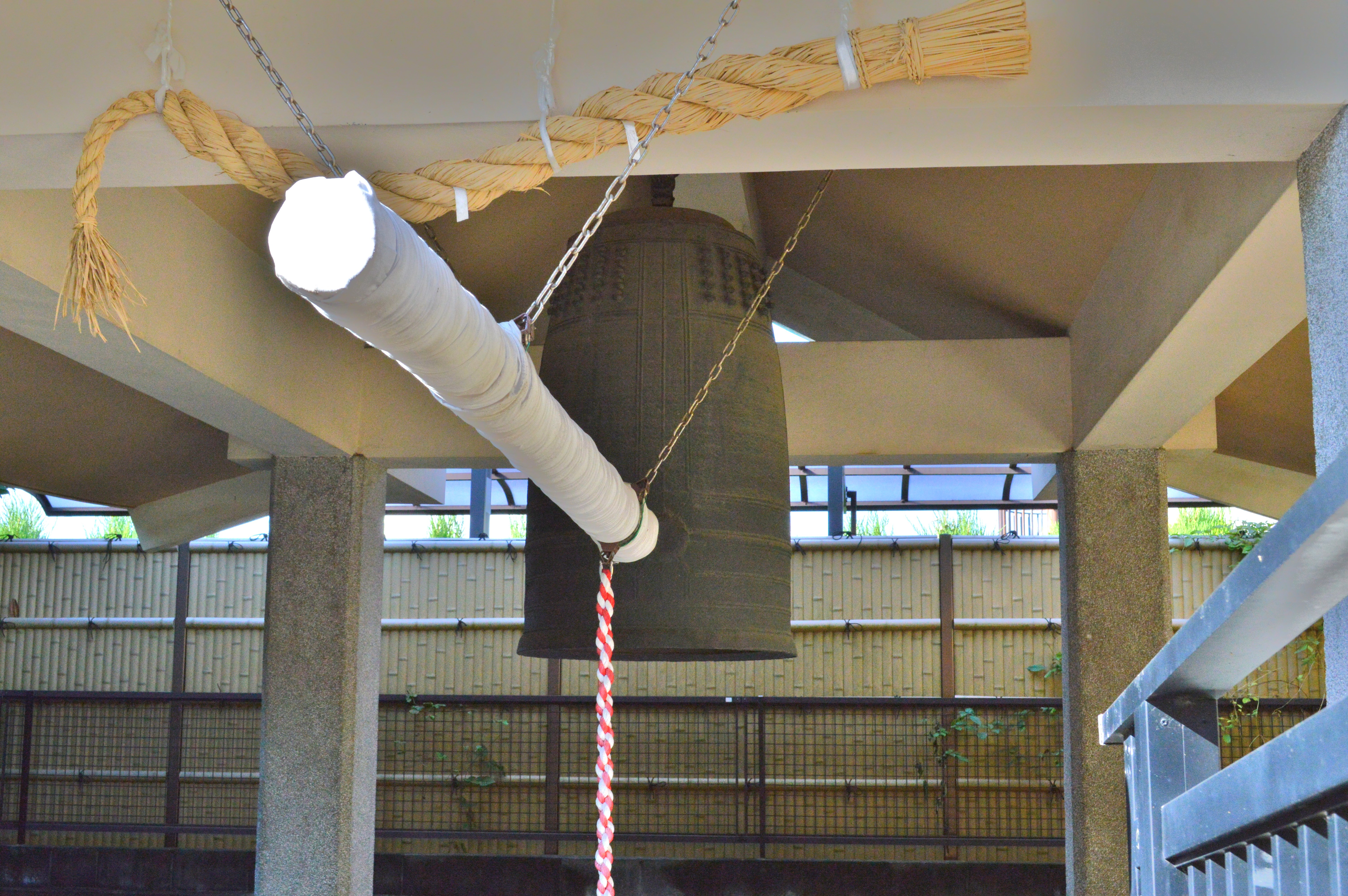
Bonshō (ICP)

== Sagami Kokubun-niji ==
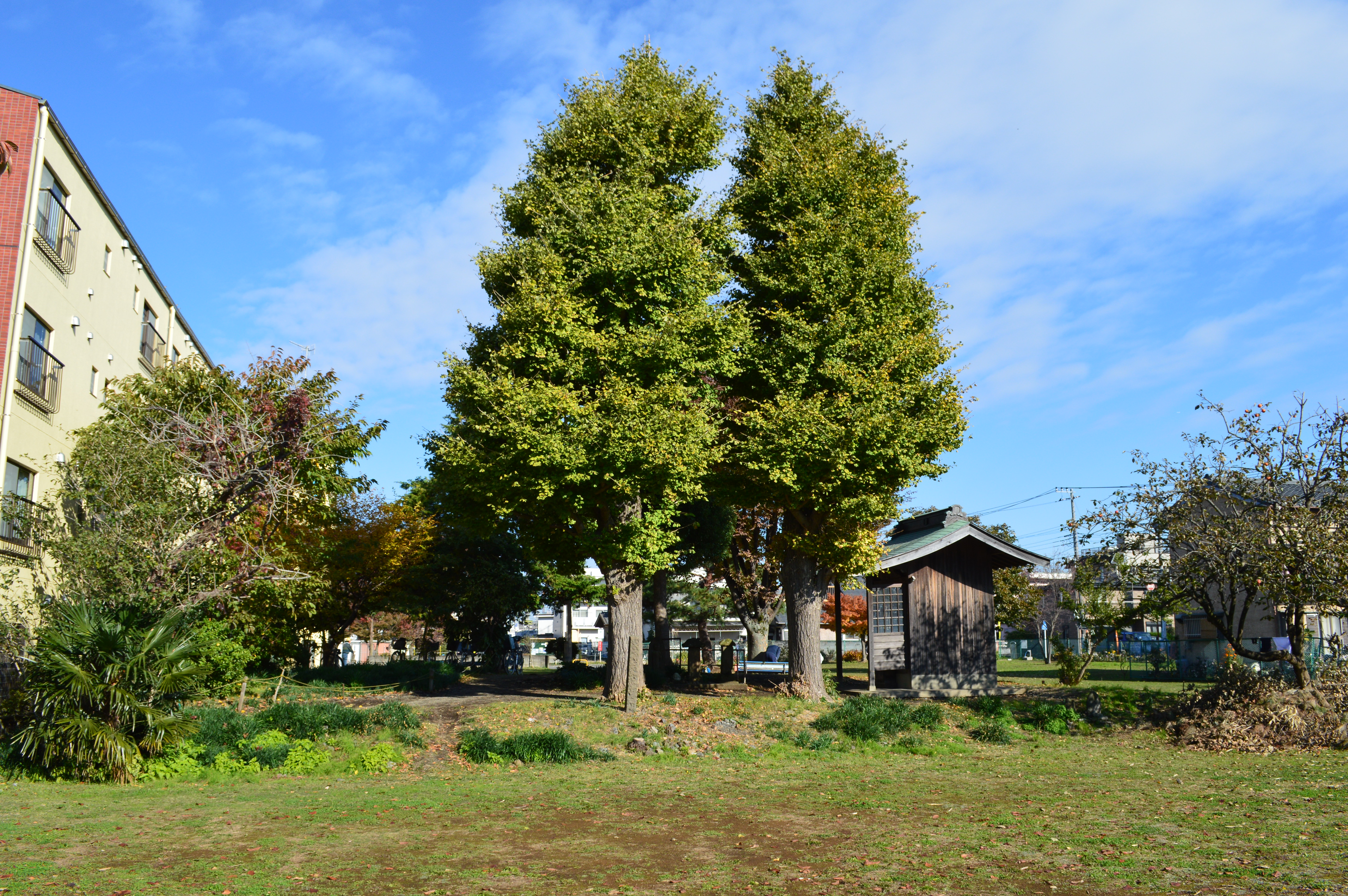
Site of Sagami Kokubun-niji

The ruins of the provincial nunnery Sagami Kokubun-niji (相模国分尼寺) associated with the Sagami Kokubun-ji are located about 500 meters north of the ruins. As with the Sagami Kokubun-ji, the nunnery occupied a walled and moated compound 175 to 200 meters square. However, unlike the Sagami Kokubun-ji, the building were arranged in a straight line from south to north with a gate, Kondō and lecture hall connected by a stone-paved passage with a bell tower on the northwest side of the Kondō and a Kyōzō on the northeast side. A rectangular cloister connected the gate with the lecture hall. The Kondō originally had a based on rammed earth with foundation stones and a tiled roof; however, it later became a thatched-roof building with pillars set directly in the ground. The site was excavated from 1918 to 1920, and intermittently from 1988 onwards. It was declared a National Historic Site in 1997 with the area under protection expanded in 2008.

Based on the dating of the excavated roof tiles and its offset alignment with the north-south axis, it is believed that Sagami Kokubun-niji was built around the fourth quarter of the 8th century, slightly later than the founding of Sagami Kokubun-ji. There is a record that the Kokubun-niji was moved to a temple called Kankawa-ji in 873, but was returned to its original location in 881 after the great earthquake of 878 destroyed the temple. Excavation results support these descriptions, showing that after a tiled building built on the original foundation stone burned down, a building with a thatched roof and pillars was rebuilt. The first building was burned down in the late 9th century, and it has been pointed out that the move of Kokubun-niji to Kankawa-ji was probably due to a fire. There is also a theory that Kokubun-niji was moved back to Kankawa-ji shortly after 881. However, the location of Kankawa-ji is currently unknown.

The two temples were originally connected by a canal, the remnants of which were discovered in 1949 and excavated in 1990.

== See also ==
- Provincial temple
- List of Historic Sites of Japan (Kanagawa)
