= San-en Nanshin Expressway =

Road in Japan

San-En Nanshin Expressway
- 三遠南信自動車道 国道474号

Route information
- Length: 99.4 km (61.8 mi)
- Existed: 1994–present
- Component highways: National Route 474

Location
- Country: Japan

Highway system
- National highways of Japan; Expressways of Japan
← National Route 473	→ National Route 475

The San En Nanshin Expressway (三遠南信自動車道, San-en Nanshin Jidōshadō) is a national expressway connecting Iida, Nagano and Hamamatsu. It is owned and operated by Ministry of Land, Infrastructure, Transport and Tourism and is signed National Route 474 as well as E69 under their "2016 Proposal for Realization of Expressway Numbering."

== Junction list ==
Toll gates are appended with TB instead of an exit number. There are currently no service areas.

Prefecture	Location	km	mi	Exit	Name	Destinations	Notes
Nagano	Iida	0.0	0.0	1	Iida-Yamamoto	National Route 153 / Chūō Expressway	Northern terminus; Chuo Expressway Exit 26-1
Nagano	Iida	7.2	4.5	2	Tenryūkyō	National Route 151	
Nagano	Iida	8.2	5.1	3	Chiyo	Nagano Prefecture Route 1	
Nagano	Iida	11.2	7.0	4	Tatsue	Unnamed road	
Nagano	Iida	14.6	9.1	5	Iida-Kamihisakata-Takagi-Tomida	National Route 256	Temporary end of expressway
Nagano	Takagi			–	Ujinori		Under construction
Nagano	Takagi	22.1	13.7	–	Takagi	Nagano Prefecture Route 251	Temporary end of expressway
Nagano	Takagi/Iida border	22.4 26.6	13.9 16.5	Yahazu Tunnel			
Nagano	Iida	26.9	16.7	–	Hodono	National Route 152	At grade junction; temporary end of expressway
44.2 km gap in the expressway, connection is made by National Route 152 / National Route 473
Shizuoka	Tenryū-ku, Hamamatsu	71.1	44.2	–	Sakuma-Kawai	National Route 473	At grade junction; temporary end of expressway
Shizuoka	Tenryū-ku, Hamamatsu	71.8– 74.2	44.6– 46.1	Kawai Tunnel			
Shizuoka	Tenryū-ku, Hamamatsu	74.3	46.2	–	Urakawa	National Route 473 / unnamed road	Southbound entrance, northbound exit
Aichi	Tōei	78.0	48.5	–	Tōei	National Route 151	At grade junction; temporary end of expressway
Aichi	7.1 km gap in the expressway, connection is made by National Route 151						
Aichi	Shinshiro	85.1	52.9	–	Hōraikyō	National Route 151	At grade junction; temporary end of expressway
Shizuoka	Kita-ku, Hamamatsu	92.5	57.5	–	Shibukawa-Terano	Unnamed road	Southbound entrance, northbound exit
Shizuoka	Kita-ku, Hamamatsu	98.5	61.2	– / TB	Hamamatsu-Inasa-kita	Shizuoka Prefecture Route 47	Southbound exit, northbound entrance
Shizuoka	Kita-ku, Hamamatsu	99.0	61.5	15	Hamamatsu-Inasa	Shin-Tōmei Expressway	Southern terminus; expressway continues as the Shin-Tomei Expressway (Inasa Branch (E69))
Shin-Tōmei Expressway (Inasa Branch) through to Tōmei Expressway
1.000 mi = 1.609 km; 1.000 km = 0.621 mi: Incomplete access; Unopened
