= Atsugi Station =

Railway station in Ebina, Kanagawa Prefecture, Japan

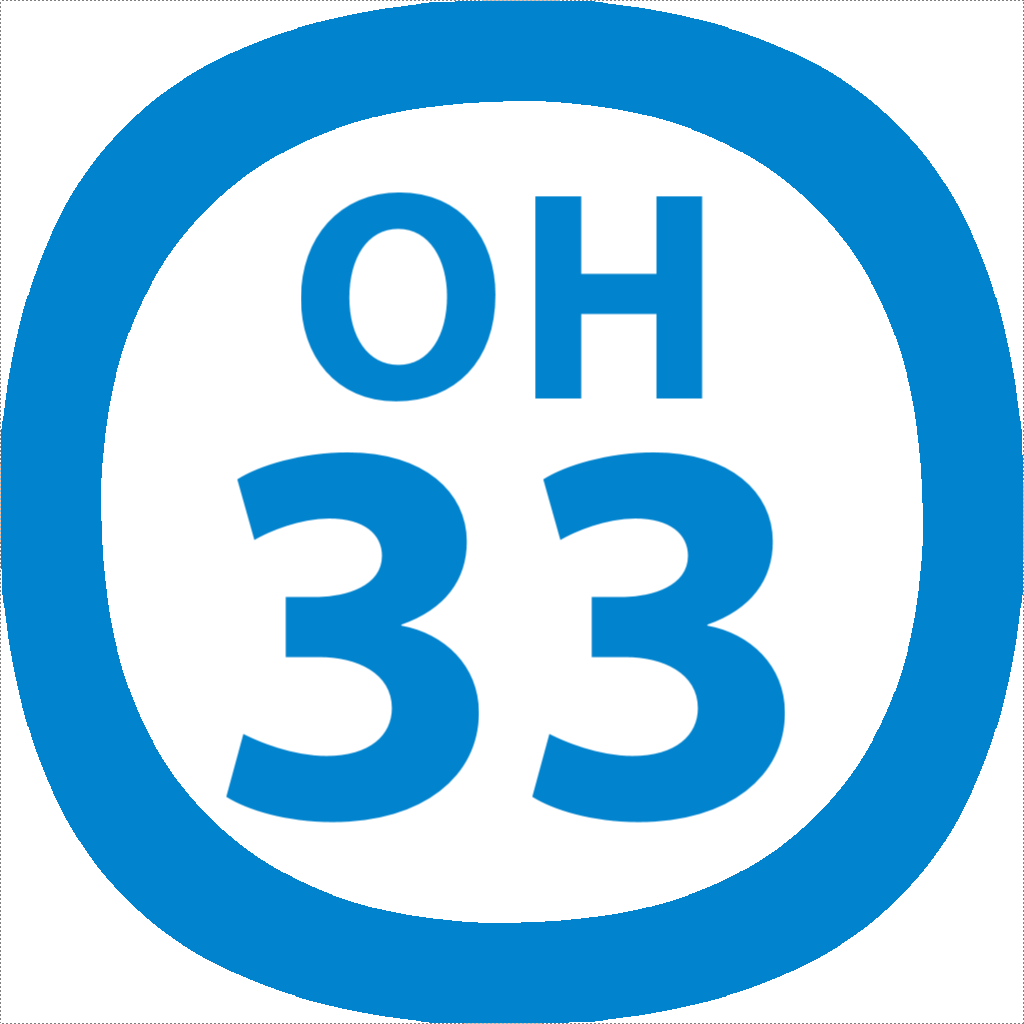
Atsugi Station 厚木駅

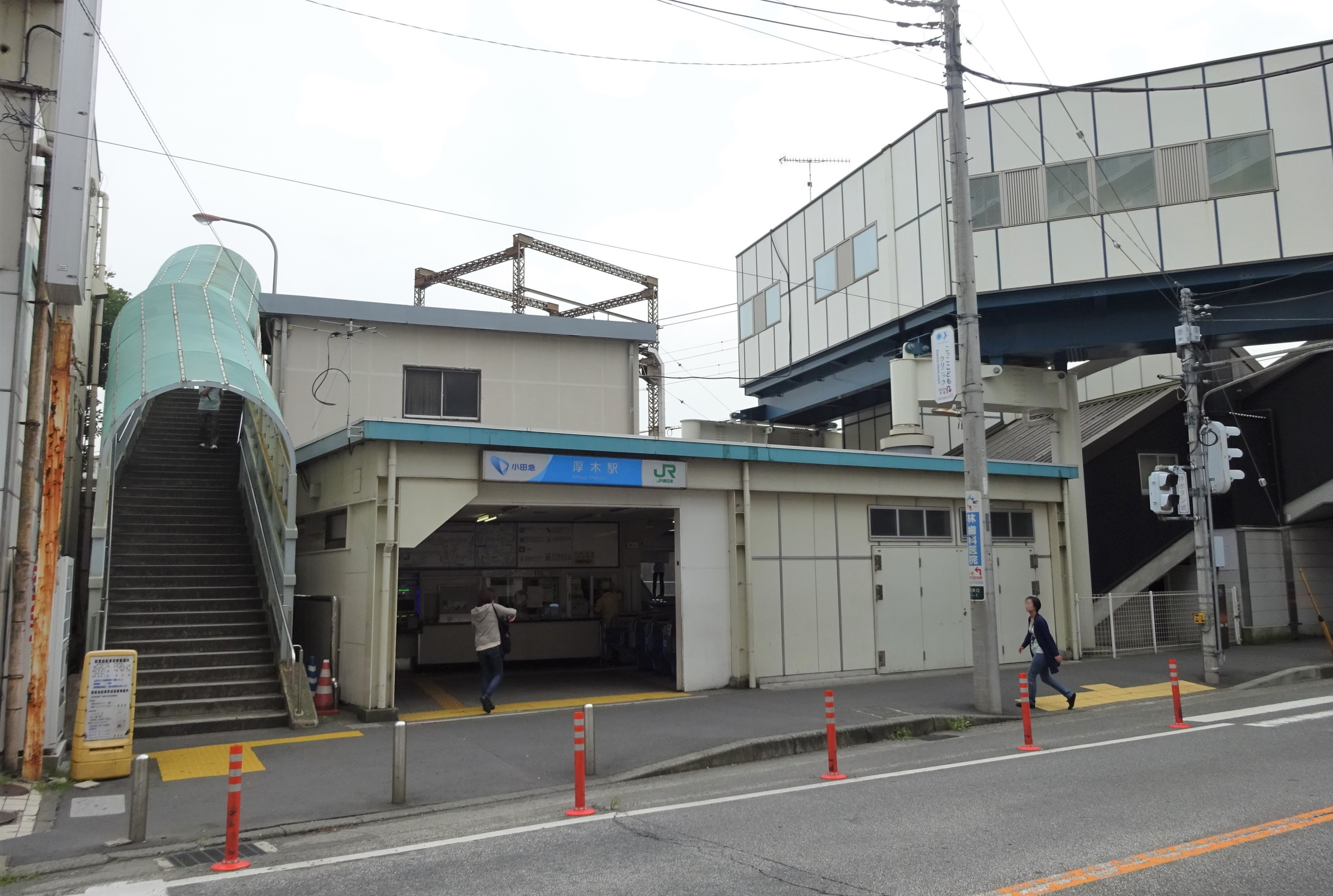
- Exit of Odakyu Atsugi Station

General information
- Location: Kawaharaguchi, Ebina-shi, Kanagawa-ken 243-0433; Japan
- Coordinates: 35°26′36.0″N 139°22′42.4″E
- Operator: Odakyu Electric Railway (manager); JR East
- Lines: Odakyu Odawara Line; ■ Sagami Line
- Distance: 44.1 km from Shinjuku
- Platforms: 3 side platforms
- Connections: Bus terminal

Other information
- Station code: OH-33 (Odakyu)

History
- Opened: 1 April 1927; 99 years ago

Passengers
- FY2019: 6,863 (JR, boarding); 20,287 (Odakyu, total)

Services
Preceding station	JR East	Following station
Shake towards Chigasaki	Sagami Line	Ebina towards Hashimoto
Preceding station	Odakyu	Following station
Hon-Atsugi One-way operation	Odawara Line Commuter Semi Express	Ebina towards Yoyogi-Uehara
Hon-Atsugi Terminus	Odawara Line Semi Express	Ebina towards Yoyogi-Uehara
Hon-Atsugi towards Odawara	Odawara Line Local	Ebina towards Shinjuku or Yoyogi-Uehara
Location
- Location within Kanagawa Prefecture Location within Japan

Atsugi Station (厚木駅, Atsugi-eki) is a joint-use passenger railway station located in the city of Ebina, Kanagawa, Japan. It is jointly operated by the private railway company Odakyu Electric Railway and by the East Japan Railway Company (JR East). Odakyu manages the station premises.

== Lines ==
Atsugi Station is served by the Sagami Line and the Odakyu Odawara Line. The station is 44.1 km (27.4 mi) from the Odawara Line's terminal at Shinjuku Station and 14.2 km (8.8 mi) from the Sagami Line's terminus at Chigasaki Station.

== Station layout ==
The Odakyu portion of station consists of two opposed side platforms with two tracks, connected to the station building by a footbridge. The JR portion of the station has a single side platform, serving one track.

=== Platforms ===
==== Odakyu ====
1	■ Odakyu Odawara Line	for Hon-Atsugi, Shin-Matsuda, and Odawara
2	■ Odakyu Odawara Line	for Sagami-Ōno, Shin-Yurigaoka, Yoyogi-Uehara, Chiyoda line Ayase, and Shinjuku

==== JR East ====
1	■ Sagami Line	for Hashimoto, Samukawa, and Chigasaki

== Station history ==
Atsugi Station was opened on 12 May 1926, as the terminus of Jinchū Railroad (神中鉄道), now Sagami Railway). Despite being located in neighboring Ebina, the station was named “Atsugi” to fulfill a pledge by the railway management to build a railroad “to Atsugi”. The Sotetsu Railway (currently the JR Sagami Line) linked to the station on 15 July 1926. On 1 April 1927, the Odakyu Electric Railway built the adjacent Kawaharaguchi Station (河原口駅). With the completion of Ebina Station on the Jinchū Railroad on 25 November 1941, operations to Atsugi were discontinued. Atsugi Station of newly nationalized Sagami Line and Kawaharaguchi Station were joined into the same station building on 1 June 1944. A new station building was opened on 31 July 1971.

Station numbering was introduced in January 2014 with Atsugi being assigned station number OH33.

== Passenger statistics ==
In fiscal 2019, the JR portion of the station was used by an average of 6,863 passengers daily (boarding passengers only). During the same period, the Odakyu station was used by an average of 20,287 passengers daily (total).

The passenger figures (boarding passengers only) for previous years are as shown below.

Fiscal year	daily average (JR)	daily average (Odakyu)
2005	5,477	8,978
2010	6,319	9,888
2015	7,029	10,570

== Surrounding area ==
The nearest railway station from US Naval Air Facility Atsugi is Sagami-Ōtsuka Station, not Atsugi Station.

== See also ==
- List of railway stations in Japan
