= Shin-Tōmei Expressway =

Expressway in Japan

Coordinates: 34.99064°N 138.29848°E

Shin-Tōmei Expressway
- 新東名高速道路

Route information
- Length: 253.2 km (157.3 mi)
- Existed: 2012–present

Location
- Country: Japan

Highway system
- National highways of Japan; Expressways of Japan

The Shin-Tōmei Expressway (新東名高速道路, Shin Tōmei Kōsoku Dōro), literally meaning New Tōmei, is a national expressway in Japan running parallel to the Tomei Expressway as an alternate route. It is operated by Central Nippon Expressway Company. The expressway is also numbered E1A, E52 and E69 under the "2016 Proposal for Realization of Expressway Numbering".

Shin-Tōmei Expressway provides a more direct and shorter route between Tokyo and Nagoya compared to the Tōmei Expressway and avoids most city centres along the way. Its western terminus connects with Isewangan Expressway in Nagoya.

== History ==
Shin-Tōmei Expressway was partially opened on April 14, 2012, with 162 km section from Gotemba, Shizuoka to Mikkabi, Hamamatsu, Shizuoka.

On February 13, 2016, the 55 km section connecting with the eastern terminus of Isewangan Expressway in Nagoya to Mikkabi was opened.

On January 28, 2018, the outer circumferential highway of Tokyo, the Ken-Ō Expressway, was linked with the Shin-Tōmei Expressway in Ebina, Kanagawa.

On March 7, 2019, the Shin Tomei Expressway between the Atsugi Minami IC and the Isehara JCT was opened to traffic.

On March 15, 2020, a 3 km section between the Isehara JCT and the Isehara-Oyama IC was opened to traffic.

On April 10, 2021, the section between the Gotemba JCT and the Shin Gotemba IC was opened to traffic.

On April 16, 2022, a 13 km section between the Isehara-Oyama IC and the Shin Hadano IC was opened to traffic, but the 25 km section between the Shin Gotemba IC and the Shin Hadano IC is still under construction.

=== Future ===
The section between Shin Gotemba IC and Shin Hadano IC is still under construction and slated to open in 2027. Once completed, Shin-Tōmei offers direct connection between Osaka, Nagoya and Tokyo through Isewangan Expressway and the Shin-Meishin Expressway. The entire cost for the project from Tokyo to Osaka is 7 trillion yen (around 50 billion dollars).

== List of interchanges and features ==
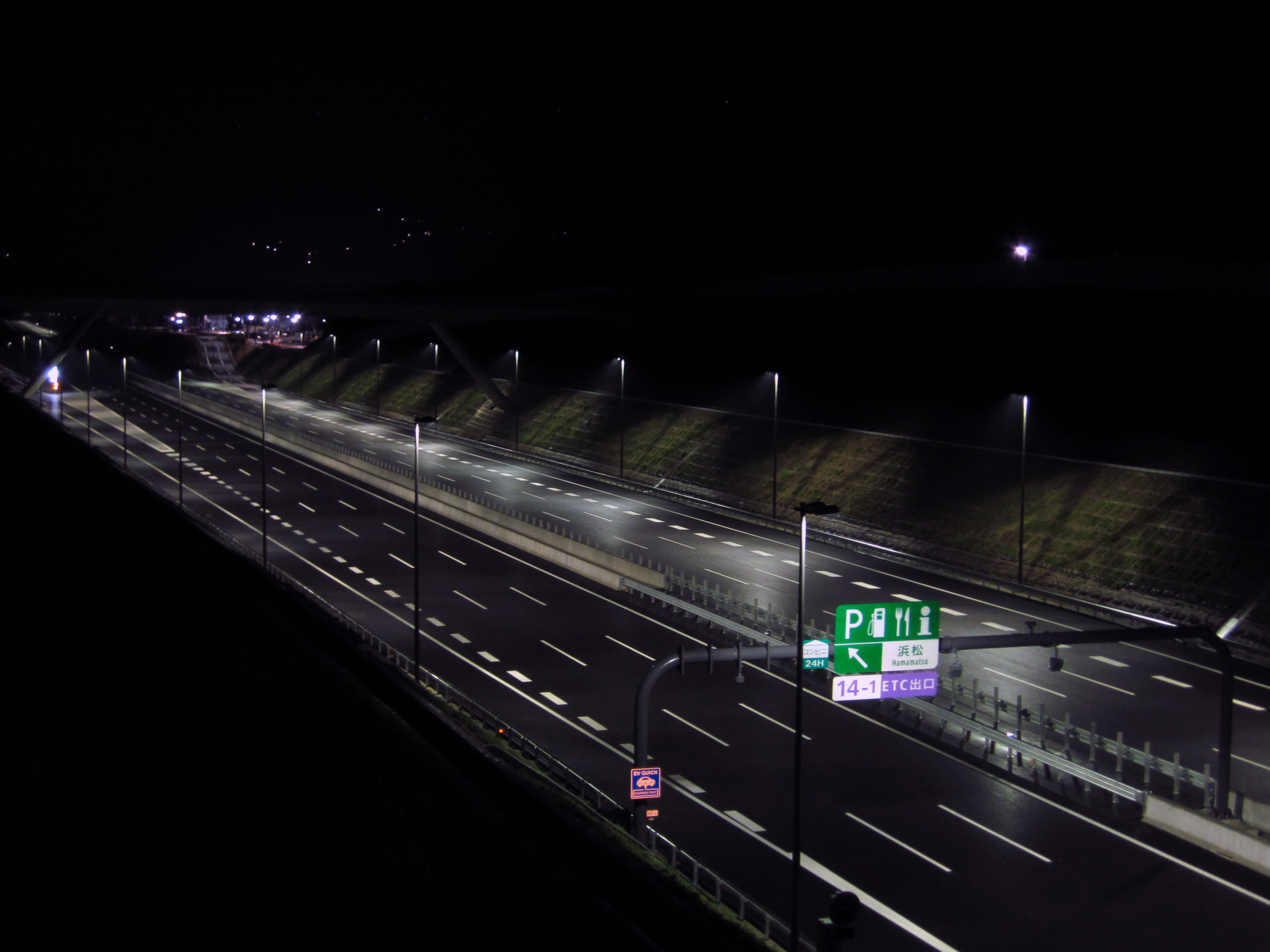
Shin-Tōmei near rest area in Hamamatsu, Shizuoka

- IC - interchange, SIC - smart interchange, JCT - junction, SA - service area, PA - parking area, BS - bus stop, TN - tunnel, TB - toll gate, BR - bridge

=== Shin-Tōmei Expressway route ===
No.	Name	Connections	Dist. from Origin	Bus Stop	Notes	Location		
Through to Daini-Tōkai Expressway (planned)
1	Ebina-minami JCT	Ken-Ō Expressway – to Tōmei Expressway, Chūō Expressway, Shin-Shōnan Bypass, Chigasaki, Hachiōji	0.0			Ebina	Kanagawa	
2	Atsugi-minami IC	National Route 129	1.5			Atsugi	Kanagawa	
5-1	Isehara JCT	Tōmei Expressway	5.8		Nagoya-bound only	Isehara	Kanagawa	
3	Isehara-Oyama IC	Pref. Route 603 (Kamikasuya Atsugi Route); Atsugi-Hadano Road	8.2			Isehara	Kanagawa	
3-1	Hadano-Tanzawa SA/ SIC	Pref. Route 705 (Horiyamashita Hadano Station Route); Atsugi-Hadano Road (Planned)	17.9		Service Area Under Construction	Hadano	Kanagawa	
4	Shin-Hadano IC	National Route 246; Atsugi-Hadano Road (Planned)	21.0			Hadano	Kanagawa	
4-1	Yamakita SIC	Pref. Route 76 (Yamakita Fujino Route)	33.0		Opening In 2027	Yamakita	Kanagawa	
4-2	Shin Oyama PA/ SIC	Access To Fuji Speedway	43.7		Opening In 2027	Oyama	Shizuoka	
5	Shin-Gotemba IC	National Route 138 ( Gotemba Bypass); Pref. Route 406 (Hitosugi Shibanta Route)	46.2			Gotemba	Shizuoka	
7-1	Gotemba JCT	Tōmei Expressway	53.3		Tokyo-bound only	Gotemba	Shizuoka	
6	Nagaizumi-Numazu IC	Pref. Route 87 (Ōoka Motonagakubo Route); Izu-Jūkan Expressway	66.5			Nagaizumi	Shizuoka	
6-1	Surugawan-Numazu SA/ SIC	Pref. Route 22 (Mishima Fuji Route)	72.0			Numazu	Shizuoka	
7	Shin-Fuji IC	Nishi-Fuji Road; Pref. Route 88 (Isshiki Kuzawa Route)	86.8			Fuji	Shizuoka	
8	Shin-Shimizu IC	National Route 52	101.2			Shimizu-ku, Shizuoka	Shizuoka	
PA	Shimizu PA		103.2			Shimizu-ku, Shizuoka	Shizuoka	
9	Shin-Shimizu JCT	Chūbu-Ōdan Expressway; Shimizu Connection Route	110.6			Shimizu-ku, Shizuoka	Shizuoka	
10	Shin-Shizuoka IC	Pref. Route 27 (Ikawako Miyuki Route); Pref. Route 74 (Yamawaki Ōya Route)	119.8			Aoi-ku, Shizuoka	Shizuoka	
10-1	Shizuoka SA/ SIC	Pref. Route 209 (Shizuoka Asahina Fujieda Route)	131.0			Aoi-ku, Shizuoka	Shizuoka	
11	Fujieda-Okabe IC	National Route 1 Pref. Route 209 (Shizuoka Asahina Fujieda Route); Pref. Route 81 (Yaizu Mori Route)	138.4			Fujieda	Shizuoka	
PA	Fujieda PA		141.3			Fujieda	Shizuoka	
12	Shimada-Kanaya IC	National Route 473; Kanaya-Omaezaki Connecting Road (Planned)	153.4			Shimada	Shizuoka	
PA	Kakegawa PA		161.0			Kakegawa	Shizuoka	
13	Mori-Kakegawa IC	Pref. Route 40 (Kakegawa Tenryū Route)	170.3			Mori	Shizuoka	
13-1	Enshū-Morimachi PA/ SIC	Pref. Route 40 (Kakegawa Tenryū Route)	173.7			Mori	Shizuoka	
13-2	Shin-Iwata SIC		178.1			Iwata	Shizuoka	
14	Hamamatsu-Hamakita IC	National Route 152	182.4			Hamana-ku, Hamamatsu	Shizuoka	
14-1	Hamamatsu SA/ SIC	Pref. Route 68 (Hamakita Mikkabi Route)	188.5			Hamana-ku, Hamamatsu	Shizuoka	
15	Hamamatsu-Inasa JCT	San-en Nanshin Expressway; Inasa Connection Route	198.0			Hamana-ku, Hamamatsu	Shizuoka	
16	Shinshiro IC	National Route 151	210.4			Hamana-ku, Hamamatsu	Shinshiro	Aichi
PA	Nagashino-Shitaragahara PA		213.3(↓); 212.8(↑)				Shinshiro	Aichi
17	Okazaki-higashi IC	National Route 473 (Okazaki-Nukata Bypass)	236.5			Okazaki		Aichi
SA	Okazaki SA		250.3			Okazaki		Aichi
1	Toyota-higashi JCT	Tōkai-Kanjō Expressway	253.2			Toyota		Aichi
Through to Isewangan Expressway
1.000 mi = 1.609 km; 1.000 km = 0.621 mi: Closed/former; Incomplete access; Route transition; Unopened

=== Shimizu Connection Route ===
- Located in Shimizu-ku, Shizuoka

No.	Name	Connections	Dist. from Shimizu JCT	Notes
9-2	Shimizu JCT	Tōmei Expressway	0.0	
9-1	Shimizu-Ihara IC	Pref. Route 75 (Shimizu Fujinomiya Route)	1.8	
9	Shin-Shimizu JCT	Shin-Tōmei Expressway Main Route	4.5	
Through to Chūbu-Ōdan Expressway
1.000 mi = 1.609 km; 1.000 km = 0.621 mi: Closed/former; Incomplete access; Route transition; Unopened

=== Inasa Connection Route ===
- Located in Kita-ku, Hamamatsu

No.	Name	Connections	Dist. from Mikkabi JCT	Notes
Through to San-en Ise Connection Route (planned)
17-1	Mikkabi JCT	Tōmei Expressway	0.0	
15-1	Hamamatsu-Inasa IC	National Route 257	11.0	
15	Hamamatsu-Inasa JCT	Shin-Tōmei Expressway Main Route	12.7	
Through to San-en Nanshin Expressway
1.000 mi = 1.609 km; 1.000 km = 0.621 mi: Closed/former; Incomplete access; Route transition; Unopened
