= Tōmei Expressway =

National expressway on the island of Honshū in Japan

Coordinates: 35.594315°N 139.573410°E

Tōmei Expressway
- 東名高速道路
- Tōmei Expressway in red

Route information
- Part of AH1
- Length: 346.8 km (215.5 mi)
- Existed: 1968–present

Major junctions
- From: Tokyo Interchange in Setagaya, Tokyo; Shuto Expressway Shibuya Route; Tokyo Metropolitan Route 311
- To: Komaki Interchange in Komaki, Aichi; Meishin Expressway; Nagoya Expressway Komaki Route; National Route 41

Location
- Country: Japan
- Major cities: Kawasaki, Yokohama, Atsugi, Fuji, Shizuoka, Hamamatsu, Toyokawa, Toyota, Nagoya, Kasugai

Highway system
- National highways of Japan; Expressways of Japan

The Tōmei Expressway (東名高速道路, Tōmei Kōsoku Dōro) is a national expressway on the island of Honshū in Japan. It is operated by Central Nippon Expressway Company. The expressway is designated as E1 under the "2016 Proposal for Realization of Expressway Numbering", because it parallels National Route 1. It is a part of the Asian Highway Network. AH1

== Naming ==
The word Tōmei is an acronym consisting of two kanji characters. The first character refers to Tokyo (東京) and the second refers to Nagoya (名古屋), which are the two major urban areas linked by the expressway.

Officially the expressway is designated as the First Tōkai Expressway. A second Tōkai Expressway (operating as the Shin-Tōmei Expressway) is under construction parallel to the existing route, and is intended to alleviate congestion problems in the near term.

The expressway is also a part of Route AH1 of the Asian Highway Network.

== Overview ==
The Tōmei Expressway is an important roadway linking Tokyo and Nagoya. It is the most heavily travelled roadway operated by Central Nippon Expressway Company, with some sections used by more than 100,000 vehicles a day.

The first sections were opened to traffic in 1968 and the entire route was completed in 1969.

From the origin in western Tokyo the expressway follows a westerly route through Kanagawa Prefecture, paralleling National Route 246 and passing to the north of Yokohama. The route continues west into Shizuoka Prefecture, passing to the south of Mount Fuji and along the coastline of Suruga Bay, paralleling National Route 1 and the historic Tōkaidō highway before reaching the city of Shizuoka. The expressway continues west, passing Lake Hamana in western Shizuoka Prefecture, and crosses into Aichi Prefecture. The expressway then heads northwest, passing to the east of the city of Nagoya and meeting the terminus of the Chūō Expressway before terminating at an interchange in the city of Komaki to the north of Nagoya. Although the Tōmei Expressway ends at this point, the roadway continues as the Meishin Expressway towards Kyoto, Osaka, and Kobe.

== List of interchanges and features ==
- IC - interchange, SIC - smart interchange, JCT - junction, SA - service area, PA - parking area, BS - bus stop, TN - tunnel, TB - toll gate, BR - bridge

No.	Name	Connections	Dist. from Origin	Bus Stop	Notes	Location	
Through to Shuto Expressway Shibuya Route
1	Tokyo IC	Met. Route 311 (Kampachi-dori Ave.)	0.0			Setagaya	Tokyo
-	Tōmei JCT	Tokyo Gaikan Expressway	↓		Planned	Setagaya	Tokyo
BR	Tamagawa Bridge		↓		Tama River crossing	Setagaya	Tokyo
BR	Tamagawa Bridge		↓		Tama River crossing	Tama-ku, Kawasaki	Kanagawa
-	Shukugawara JCT	Shuto Expressway Kawasaki Route	↓		Planned	Tama-ku, Kawasaki	Kanagawa
TB	Tokyo Toll Gate/ Mukaigaoka Bus Stop		6.7	○		Miyamae-ku, Kawasaki	Kanagawa
3	Tōmei-Kawasaki IC		7.6			Miyamae-ku, Kawasaki	Kanagawa
BS	Eda Bus Stop		10.5	○		Aoba-ku, Yokohama	Kanagawa
3-1	Yokohama-Aoba IC	National Route 246; Shuto Expressway Yokohama Northwest Route	13.3			Aoba-ku, Yokohama	Kanagawa
PA	Kōhoku PA		14.2			Midori-ku, Yokohama	Kanagawa
4	Yokohama-Machida IC/ Yokohama Bus Stop	National Route 16 (Yamato Bypass); National Route 246; Hodogaya Bypass	19.7	X	Bus Stop closed	Midori-ku, Yokohama	Kanagawa
BS	Yamato Bus Stop		24.0	○		Yamato	Kanagawa
TN	Yamato Tunnel		↓			Yamato	Kanagawa
BS	Ayase Bus Stop		28.8	○		Ayase	Kanagawa
-	Ayase SIC	Pref. Route 42 (Fujisawa Zama Atsugi Route)	33.9		Planned	Ayase	Kanagawa
SA	Ebina SA		31.3			Ebina	Kanagawa
4-1	Ebina JCT	Ken-Ō Expressway	33.9			Ebina	Kanagawa
5	Atsugi IC	Odawara-Atsugi Road; National Route 129; National Route 246	35.0			Atsugi	Kanagawa
BS	Atsugi Bus Stop		36.7	○		Atsugi	Kanagawa
5-1	Isehara JCT	Shin-Tōmei Expressway	40.0			Isehara	Kanagawa
BS	Isehara Bus Stop		41.7	○		Isehara	Kanagawa
5-2	Hadano-Nakai IC/ Hadano Bus Stop	Pref. Route 71 (Hadano Ninomiya Route); Atsugi-Hadano Road (Planned)	50.1	○		Hadano	Kanagawa
PA	Nakai PA		53.6			Nakai	Kanagawa
BS	Ōi Bus Stop		57.1	○		Ōi	Kanagawa
6	Ōi-Matsuda IC	National Route 246; National Route 255; Pref. Route 78 (Gotenba Ōi Route)	57.9			Ōi	Kanagawa
BS	Matsuda Bus Stop		60.2	○		Matsuda	Kanagawa
BS	Yamakita Bus Stop		63.6	○		Yamakita	Kanagawa
TN	Azumayama Tunnel		↓			Yamakita	Kanagawa
TN	Shintsuburano Tunnel (Komaki-bound); Tsuburano Tunnel (Tokyo-bound)		↓			Yamakita	Kanagawa
TN	Torideyama Tunnel		↓		Tokyo-bound only	Yamakita	Kanagawa
TN	Tarogao Tunnel		↓		Tokyo-bound only	Yamakita	Kanagawa
TN	Kitahata Tunnel		↓		Tokyo-bound only	Yamakita	Kanagawa
PA	Ayuzawa PA		71.9(↓); 72.5(↑)		Komaki-bound: Accessible only to Left Route	Yamakita	Kanagawa
TN	Sakuradaira Tunnel		↓		Tokyo-bound only	Oyama	Shizuoka
TN	Takao Tunnel		↓		Tokyo-bound only	Oyama	Shizuoka
BS	Oyama Bus Stop		75.5	○	Komaki-bound: Accessible only to Left Route	Oyama	Shizuoka
TN	Shoryo Tunnel		↓		Tokyo-bound only	Oyama	Shizuoka
TN	Shirahata Tunnel		↓		Tokyo-bound only	Oyama	Shizuoka
BR	Tomei Ashigara Bridge				Tokyo-bound only	Oyama	Shizuoka
BS	Ashigara Bus Stop		79.2	○		Oyama	Shizuoka
SA (6-1)	Ashigara SA/ SIC		80.9			Oyama	Shizuoka
SA (6-1)	Ashigara SA/ SIC		80.9			Gotemba	Shizuoka
7	Gotemba IC (No.2)	National Route 138 (Gotemba Bypass)	83.7		Komaki-bound exit, Tokyo-bound entrance only	Gotemba	Shizuoka
7	Gotemba IC (No.1)/ Gotemba Bus Stop	Pref. Route 401 (Gotemba Hakone Route)	83.7	○		Gotemba	Shizuoka
7-1	Gotemba JCT	Shin-Tōmei Expressway	88.3		Tokyo-bound only	Gotemba	Shizuoka
PA (7-2)	Komakado PA/ SIC		89.9(↓); 90.0(↑)	X	Bus Stop closed	Gotemba	Shizuoka
7-3	Susono IC	National Route 246; Pref. Route 82 (Susono Inter Route)	93.8			Susono	Shizuoka
BS	Susono Bus Stop		95.5	○		Susono	Shizuoka
8	Numazu IC	Pref. Route 83 (Numazu Inter Route); Izu-Jūkan Expressway	103.3	○		Numazu	Shizuoka
PA (8-1)	Ashitaka PA/ SIC		105.9	○		Numazu	Shizuoka
BS	Hara Bus Stop		↓	X	Closed	Numazu	Shizuoka
BS	Nakazato Bus Stop		115.7	○		Fuji	Shizuoka
9	Fuji IC	Nishi-Fuji Road; National Route 139; Pref. Route 353 (Tagonourakō Fuji Inter Route); Shin-Tōmei Expressway	121.5	○		Fuji	Shizuoka
BS	Matsuoka Bus Stop		125.0	○		Fuji	Shizuoka
SA (9-1)	Fujikawa SA/ SIC	Pref. Route 10 (Fujikawa Minobu Route)	127.5	○		Fuji	Shizuoka
TN	Kambara Tunnel		↓		Length - 714 m	Shimizu-ku, Shizuoka	Shizuoka
BS	Kambara Bus Stop		133.1	○		Shimizu-ku, Shizuoka	Shizuoka
PA	Yui PA		138.6(↓); 139.7(↑)			Shimizu-ku, Shizuoka	Shizuoka
TN	Satta Tunnel		↓			Shimizu-ku, Shizuoka	Shizuoka
BS	Okitsu Bus Stop		142.5	○		Shimizu-ku, Shizuoka	Shizuoka
TN	Okitsu Tunnel		↓			Shimizu-ku, Shizuoka	Shizuoka
TN	Seikenji Tunnel		↓			Shimizu-ku, Shizuoka	Shizuoka
TN	Sodeshi Tunnel		↓			Shimizu-ku, Shizuoka	Shizuoka
9-2	Shimizu JCT	Shin-Tōmei Expressway	146.4			Shimizu-ku, Shizuoka	Shizuoka
10	Shimizu IC	National Route 1 (Seishin Bypass)	147.8	○		Shimizu-ku, Shizuoka	Shizuoka
PA	Nihondaira PA		155.8	○		Suruga-ku, Shizuoka	Shizuoka
10-1	Nihondaira-Kunōzan SIC		158.8			Suruga-ku, Shizuoka	Shizuoka
11	Shizuoka IC	Pref. Route 84 (Nakajima Minamiabe Route)	161.8	○		Suruga-ku, Shizuoka	Shizuoka
TN	Nihonzaka Tunnel		↓		Tokyo-bound Left Route - 2,378 m Tokyo-bound Right Route - 2,371 m Komaki-bound - 2,555 m	Suruga-ku, Shizuoka	Shizuoka
TN	Nihonzaka Tunnel		↓		Tokyo-bound Left Route - 2,378 m Tokyo-bound Right Route - 2,371 m Komaki-bound - 2,555 m	Yaizu	Shizuoka
PA	Nihonzaka PA		171.5(↓); 171.6(↑)			Yaizu	Shizuoka
12	Yaizu IC	Pref. Route 81 (Yaizu Mori Route)	173.6			Yaizu	Shizuoka
BS	Yaizu-nishi Bus Stop		176.1	○		Yaizu	Shizuoka
12-1	Ōigawa-Yaizu-Fujieda SIC		181.0			Yaizu	Shizuoka
BS	Ōigawa Bus Stop		181.0	○		Yaizu	Shizuoka
13	Yoshida IC	Pref. Route 34 (Shimada Yoshida Route)	185.6	○		Yoshida	Shizuoka
SA	Makinohara SA/ Bus Stop		194.5	○		Makinohara	Shizuoka
13-1	Sagara-Makinohara IC	National Route 473	197.0			Makinohara	Shizuoka
14	Kikugawa IC	Pref. Route 79 (Yoshida Daitō Route)	201.8	○		Kikugawa	Shizuoka
14-1	Kakegawa IC		207.8	○		Kakegawa	Shizuoka
PA	Ogasa PA		209.7			Kakegawa	Shizuoka
BS	Okatsu Bus Stop		212.9	○		Kakegawa	Shizuoka
15	Fukuroi IC	Pref. Route 61 (Hamakita Fukuroi Route)	219.4	○		Fukuroi	Shizuoka
15-1	Iwata IC	Pref. Route 86 (Iwata Inter Route); Pref. Route 283 (Yokokawa Iwata Route)	223.3		Former site of Iwatahara PA	Iwata	Shizuoka
PA (15-2)	Enshū-Toyoda PA/ SIC		225.2			Iwata	Shizuoka
BS	Iwata Bus Stop		226.2	○		Iwata	Shizuoka
16	Hamamatsu IC	Pref. Route 65 (Hamamatsu Kanjō Route)	230.0			Chūō-ku, Hamamatsu	Shizuoka
BS	Hamamatsu-kita Bus Stop		233.5	○		Chūō-ku, Hamamatsu	Shizuoka
PA (16-1)	Mikatagahara PA/ SIC		234.9			Chūō-ku, Hamamatsu	Shizuoka
16-2	Hamamatsu-nishi IC	Pref. Route 65 (Hamamatsu Kanjō Route)	240.5			Chūō-ku, Hamamatsu	Shizuoka
16-3	Kanzanji SIC	Pref. Route 320 (Inasa Kanzanji Route); Pref. Route 368 (Kotō kanzanji Route)	244.7			Chūō-ku, Hamamatsu	Shizuoka
BS	Kanzanji Bus Stop		244.7	○		Chūō-ku, Hamamatsu	Shizuoka
BR	Hamanako Bridge		↓		Length - 603 m		Shizuoka
BR	Hamanako Bridge		↓		Length - 603 m	Hamana-ku, Hamamatsu	Shizuoka
SA	Hamanako SA		247.9	○		Hamana-ku, Hamamatsu	Shizuoka
17	Mikkabi IC	Pref. Route 85 (Mikkabi Inter Route); Pref. Route 308 (Hōrai Mikkabi Route)	251.1			Hamana-ku, Hamamatsu	Shizuoka
TN	Mikkabi Tunnel		↓			Hamana-ku, Hamamatsu	Shizuoka
BS	Mikkabi Bus Stop		255.0	○		Hamana-ku, Hamamatsu	
17-1	Mikkabi JCT	Shin-Tōmei Expressway	255.8			Hamana-ku, Hamamatsu	
TN	Uri Tunnel		↓			Hamana-ku, Hamamatsu	
TN	Uri Tunnel		↓			Shinshiro	Aichi
PA	Shinshiro PA		261.1			Shinshiro	Aichi
BS	Toyohashi-kita Bus Stop		262.3	○		Toyohashi	Aichi
PA	Toyohashi PA					Toyohashi	Aichi
18	Toyokawa IC	National Route 151	269.0	○		Toyokawa	Aichi
PA	Akatsuka PA		274.0			Toyokawa	Aichi
BS	Otowa Bus Stop		279.1	○		Toyokawa	Aichi
18-1	Otowa-Gamagōri IC	National Route 1 Otowa-Gamagōri Toll Road	280.2			Toyokawa	Aichi
BS	Motojuku Bus Stop		285.4	○		Okazaki	Aichi
PA	Miai PA		289.7			Okazaki	Aichi
19	Okazaki IC	National Route 1 Pref. Route 26 (Okazaki Kanjō Route)	293.4	○		Okazaki	Aichi
-	Okazaki-Achiwa SIC				Planned	Okazaki	Aichi
BS	Iwazu Bus Stop		301.5	○		Okazaki	Aichi
19-2	Toyota JCT	Isewangan Expressway	304.1			Toyota	Aichi
SA (19-3)	Toyota-Kamigō SA/ SIC	Pref. Route 76 (Toyota Anjō Route)	305.8	○		Toyota	Aichi
20	Toyota IC	National Route 155 (Toyota-minami Bypass); Pref. Route 76 (Toyota Anjō Route)	310.8	○		Toyota	Aichi
20-1	Tōmei-Miyoshi IC/ Miyoshi Bus Stop	Pref. Route 54 (Toyota Chiryū Route)	315.8	○		Miyoshi	Aichi
PA	Tōgō PA		318.1			Nisshin	Aichi
BS	Nisshin Bus Stop		319.3	○		Nisshin	Aichi
20-2	Nisshin JCT	Nagoya-Seto Road	322.3			Nisshin	Aichi
21	Nagoya IC	Mei-Nikan Expressway; Pref. Route 60 (Nagoya Nagakute Route)	325.5			Meitō-ku, Nagoya	Aichi
BS	Asahi Bus Stop		329.5	X	Closed	Owariasahi	Aichi
PA (21-1)	Moriyama PA/ SIC		333.7			Moriyama-ku, Nagoya	Aichi
22	Kasugai IC	National Route 19	337.7	X	Bus Stop closed	Kasugai	Aichi
23	Komaki JCT	Chūō Expressway	339.9			Komaki	Aichi
24	Komaki IC	Nagoya Expressway Komaki Route (via Komaki-kita Interchange); National Route 41	346.8			Komaki	Aichi
Through to Meishin Expressway
1.000 mi = 1.609 km; 1.000 km = 0.621 mi: Closed/former; Incomplete access; Route transition; Unopened

== Lanes ==
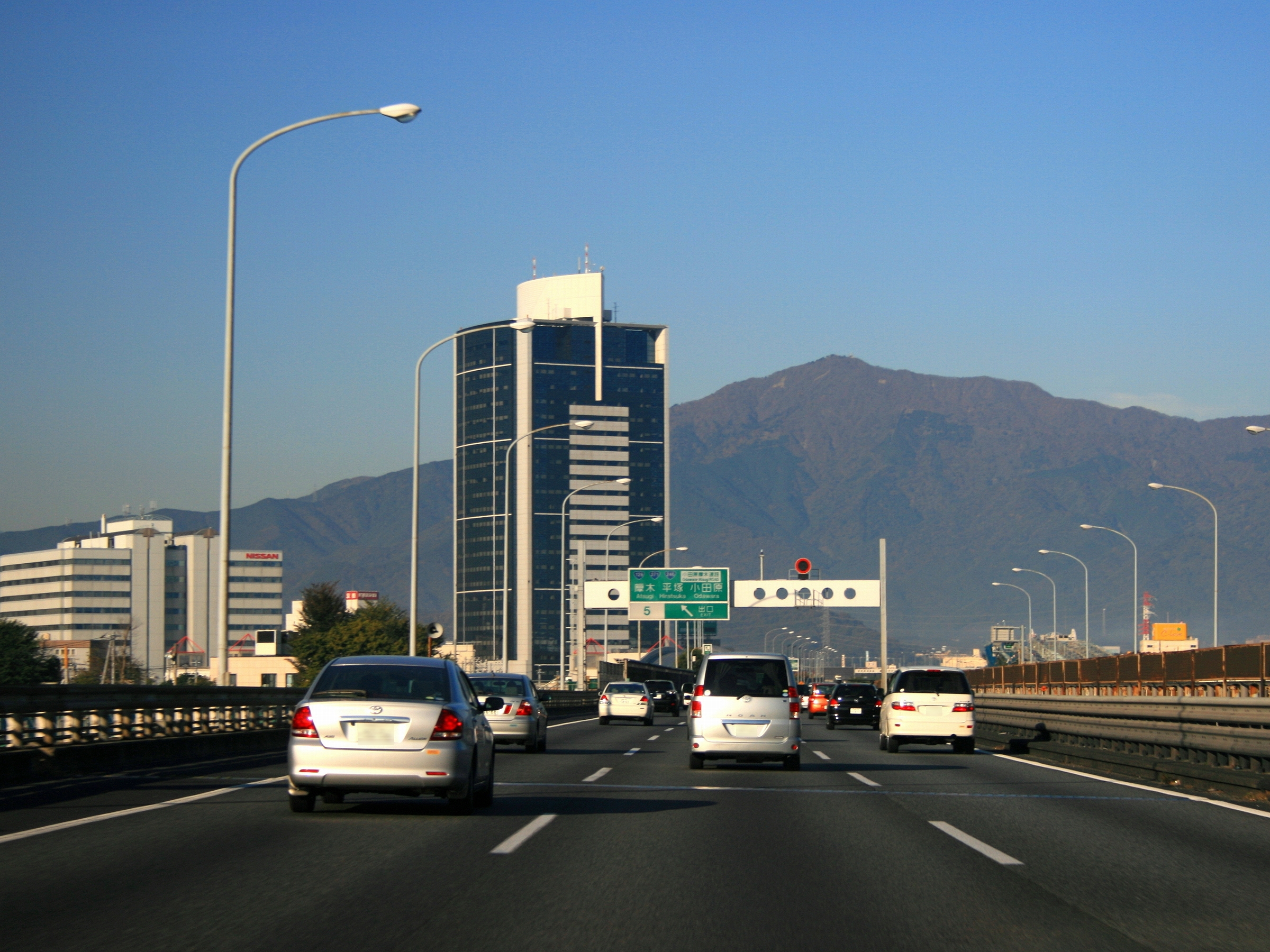
Tōmei Expressway in Atsugi

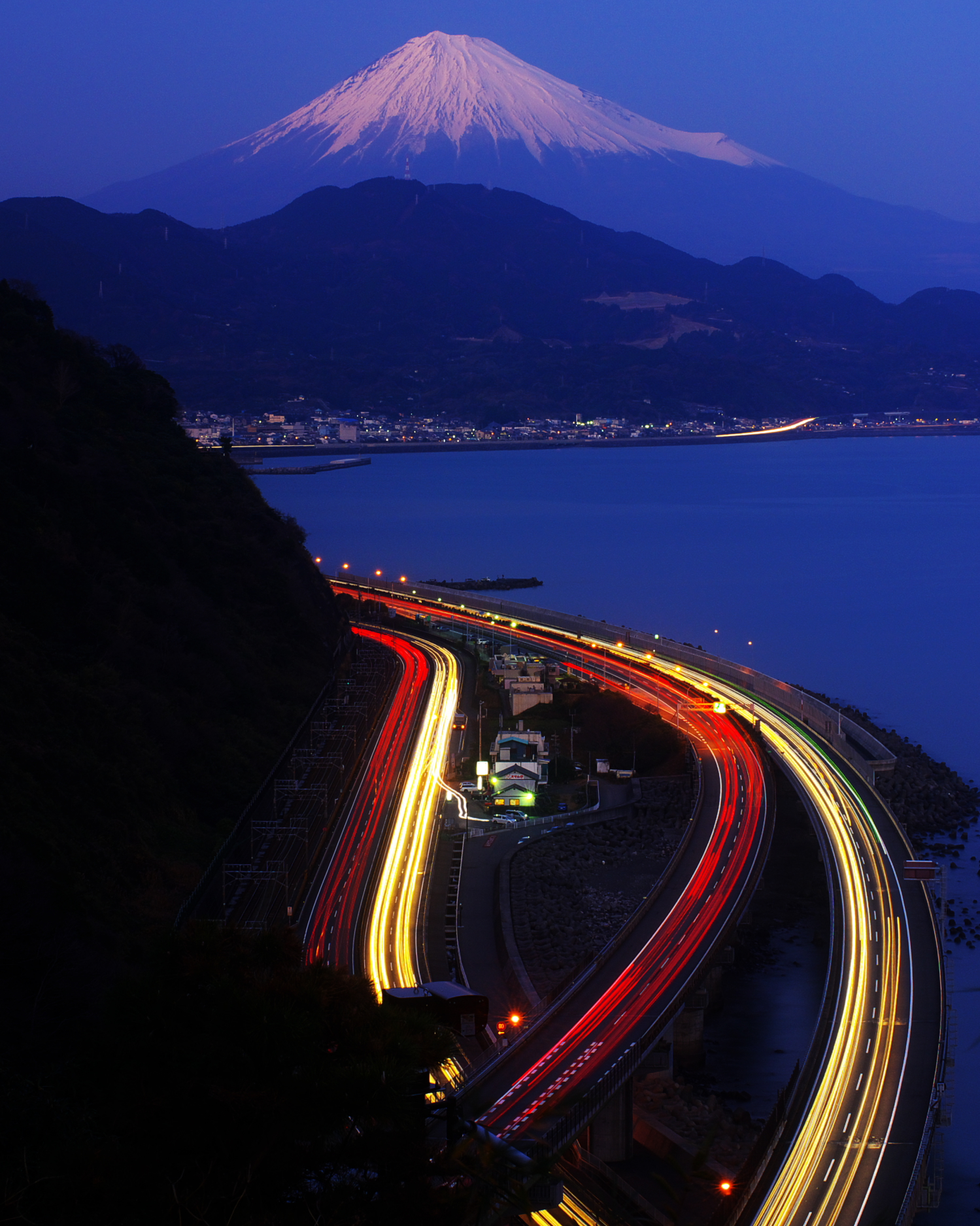
The landscape at evening near Yui parking area. From right to left: Suruga Bay, Tōmei Expressway, National Route 1, Tōkaidō Main Line

Section	Tokyo-bound Lanes	Komaki-bound Lanes
Shuto Expressway - Tokyo IC	Two	
Tokyo IC - Ayase BS	Three	
Ayase BS - Ebina JCT	Four	Three
Ebina JCT - Ōi-Matsuda IC	Three	
Ōi-Matsuda IC - Ashigara BS	Three	Two (Left Route) + Two (Right Route)
Ashigara BS - Komakado PA	Three	
Komakado PA - Shizuoka IC	Two	
Shizuoka IC - Nihonzaka Tunnel	Three	Two
Nihonzaka Tunnel	Two (Left Route) + Two (Right Route)	Three
Nihonzaka Tunnel - Nihonzaka PA	Three	
Nihonzaka PA - Yaizu IC	Two	Three
Yaizu IC - Komaki IC	Two	

- Sections with left and right routes formerly carried 2 lanes of traffic in each direction. An additional roadway (carrying 3 lanes of traffic in one direction only) has been constructed parallel to the existing 4 lanes to alleviate congestion. The original 4 lanes are then converted for the use of traffic in the opposite direction.

== See also ==
- Shin-Tōmei Expressway
- Asian Highway Network
- Central Nippon Expressway Company
- Expressways of Japan
