= Nishi-Fuji Road =

Toll road in Shizuoka Prefecture, Japan

Nishi-Fuji Road
- 西富士道路

Route information
- Length: 6.8 km (4.2 mi)
- Existed: 1982–present
- Component highways: National Route 139

Major junctions
- From: Fuji Interchange, National Route 139 / Tōmei Expressway in Fuji, Shizuoka
- To: Koizumi Interchange, Shizuoka Prefecture Route 76 in Fujinomiya, Shizuoka

Location
- Country: Japan

Highway system
- National highways of Japan; Expressways of Japan

The Nishi-Fuji Road (西富士道路, Nishifuji Dōro) (lit. West Fuji Road) is a 4-laned toll road in Shizuoka Prefecture, Japan. It is owned and managed by Central Nippon Expressway Company. It is a bypass of National Route 139.

== Route description ==
Officially, the road is designated as a bypass for National Route 139. It is also classified as a road for motor vehicles only (自動車専用道路, Jidōsha Senyō Dōro) and access is controlled with interchanges and junctions in a similar manner to national expressways in Japan.

The road connects the cities of Fuji and Fujinomiya in Shizuoka Prefecture. In Fuji, the road connects directly to an interchange with the Tōmei Expressway and follows a northeasterly course to Fujinomiya.

Tolls are collected at a toll plaza near the northern terminus in Fujinomiya. The toll for a regular passenger car is 200 yen. Electronic Toll Collection (ETC) is accepted for payment, however no discount programs are in effect. Since there are no toll collection points between Fuji Interchange and Hiromi Interchange this section of the road is effectively free.

== History ==
The Nishi-Fuji Road opened on 2 April 1982. On 14 April 2012, the road received another junction with the newly built Shin-Tōmei Expressway.

== Junction list ==
The entire toll road is in Shizuoka Prefecture.

Location	km	mi	Exit	Name	Destinations	Notes
Roadway continues as Shizuoka Prefecture Route 353 (Tagourakō Fuji Inter Route)
Fuji	0.0– 0.7	0.0– 0.43	9	Fuji	National Route 139 / Tōmei Expressway	Southern terminus of the toll road
Fuji	1.7	1.1	—	Hiromi		
Fuji	3.4	2.1	7	Shin-Fuji	Shin-Tōmei Expressway	
Fujinomiya	6.8	4.2	—	Koizumi	Shizuoka Prefecture Route 76 (Fuji Fujinomiya Yui Route)	Northern terminus of the toll road
Roadway continues as National Route 139
1.000 mi = 1.609 km; 1.000 km = 0.621 mi: Route transition
