= Union station =

Railway station shared by railway companies

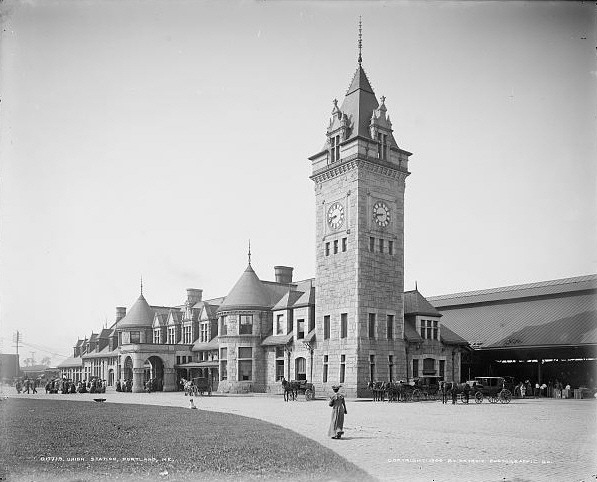
The former Union Station in Portland, Maine

A union station, union terminal, joint station, or joint-use station is a railway station at which the tracks and facilities are shared by two or more separate railway companies, allowing passengers to connect conveniently between them. The term 'union station' is used in North America and 'joint station' is used in Europe.

In the U.S., union stations are typically used by all the passenger trains serving a city, although exceptions exist. For example, in Chicago, the Illinois Central, Rock Island, Chicago & Western Indiana, Baltimore & Ohio, and Chicago & North Western depots coexisted with Union Station, and although most Metra commuter trains (and all Amtrak services) continue to use Union Station today, some lines depart from other terminals, such as Ogilvie Transportation Center, LaSalle Street Station, or Millennium Station.

The busiest station to be named "Union Station" is Toronto Union Station, which serves over 72 million passengers annually. The first union station building was Columbus Union Station in 1851, though Indianapolis Union Station, planned in 1848 and built in 1853, had more elements of a cooperative union station.

== Europe ==
In most countries in Europe, throughout much of the 20th century, railways have been owned and operated by state enterprises. Where only one railway company exists, there is no need for a "joint station". However, before nationalisation many companies existed and sometimes they had "joint stations". In some cases this persists today. "Joint stations" are often found near borders where two state-owned railway companies meet.

=== Austria, Germany, and Switzerland ===
In German-speaking countries, the similar term Gemeinschaftsbahnhof is used in administrative language only; it applies for stations with joint facilities as well as for stations with side-by-side facilities; some border stations also fall under that term. The general public often call them "Hauptbahnhof" (main station), but this is a misnomer, as stations administratively classified as "Hauptbahnhof" need not be served by multiple operators.

Many major stations in Germany are served by various trains operated by incumbent Deutsche Bahn and other railways that operate local passenger trains, sometimes also by railway companies of neighbor states that operate trans-border connections; a special term like union station is usually not used. The stations are generally owned and operated by DB InfraGO.

As another example, Leipzig Hauptbahnhof, the main station of Leipzig, originally consisted of side-by-side parts that were used by the Prussian and Saxonian Railways until the federal Deutsche Reichsbahn was founded in 1920, but were essentially two stations operated separately by the two neighbors.

=== Bohemia and Moravia ===
In Bohemia (part of the territory of the Czech Republic today) some stations were called the "společné nádraží" (the common station) before the state took over the private railway companies. "Praha-Smíchov společné nádraží" is to this day the functional name of the second station built in 1872 by the same investor near the first station Smíchov of the Pražská západní dráha (Prague Western Railroad). The new station served as the main marshalling yard of Prague. Three routes flowed into it: Pražská spojovací dráha (the Prague Connecting Railroad, 1872), the extension of Buštěhradská dráha from Hostivice (1872) and Pražsko-duchcovská dráha (the Railroad Prague – Duchcov, 1873). Nowadays the "společné nádraží" forms an unremarkable separate platform of the station Praha-Smíchov, known in timetables as "Praha-Smíchov severní nástupiště" (the northern platform).

"Společné nádraží" was built 1845–1848 at Brno.

"Společné nádraží" was at Železná Ruda as well, station at border Bavaria – Austro-Hungarian Empire. It was in operation 1878–1938.

Nowadays the largest stations are called "hlavní nádraží" (main station).

=== United Kingdom ===
In the United Kingdom, before the railways were nationalised in 1948, stations shared by multiple operators were referred to as "joint stations", but is not as familiar or as well understood as "union station" is in the United States.

== Japan ==
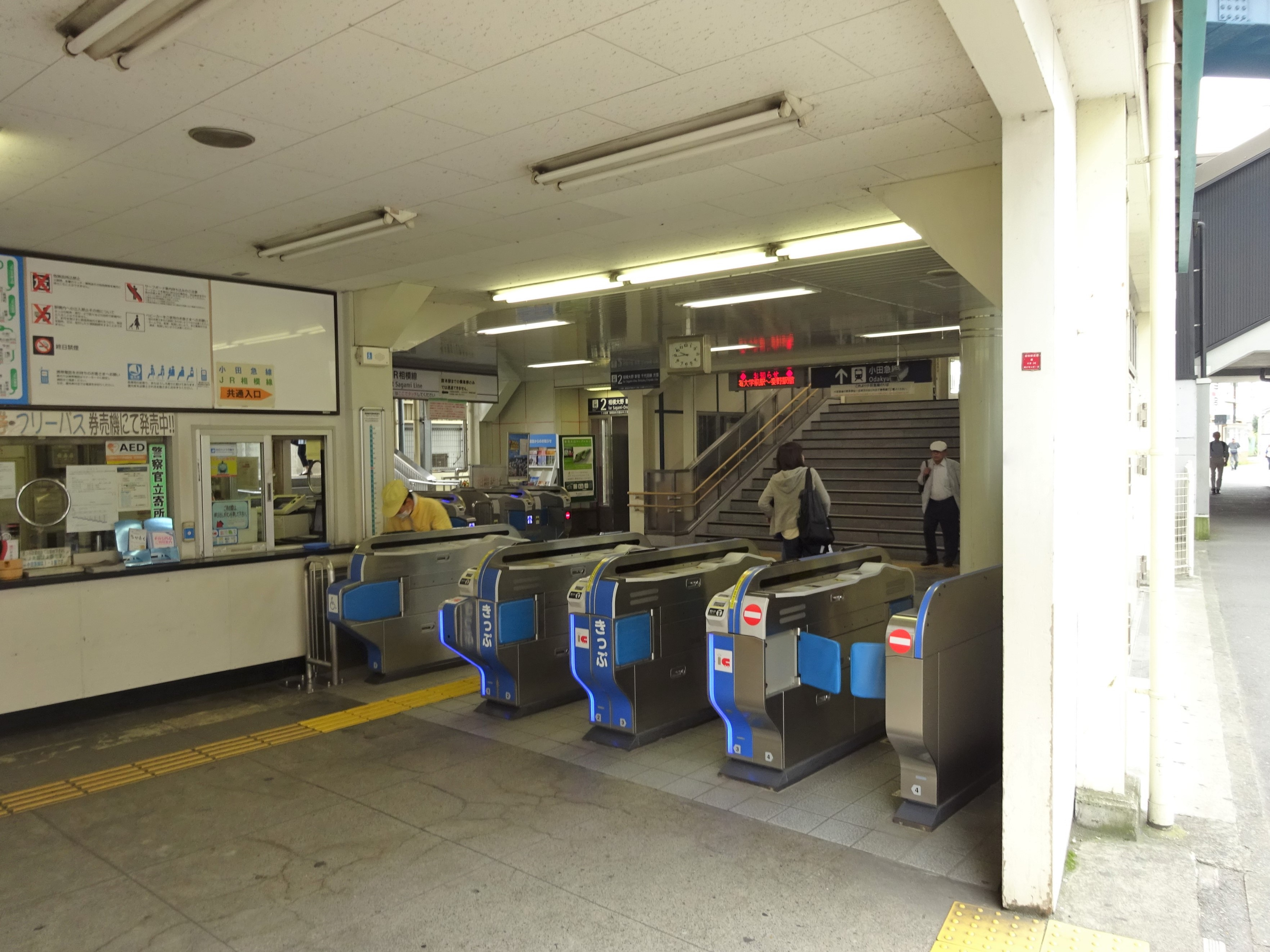
Ticket gates in Atsugi Station, shared between JR East and Odakyu Electric Railway.

In Japan, such a railway station is referred to as a joint-use station (共同使用駅, Kyōdō shiyō-eki). At railway junctions where two or more railway lines operated by different companies meet, the companies may reach an agreement to entrust one of the companies to manage the entire station, resulting in the establishment of a joint-use station. In contrast, an interchange station (乗換駅, Norikae-eki) in Japan is where different sections of a station are managed by different companies at the same time.

Many joint-use stations in Japan are located at or near the boundary of two railway lines operated by different companies that operate through services to each other, such as Meinohama Station in Fukuoka, where JR Kyushu's Chikuhi Line meets the Fukuoka City Subway's Airport Line. Joint-use stations may also be built at places where railway lines operated by different companies share the same tracks, as is the case from Meguro Station to Shirokane-Takanawa Station in Tokyo, which is shared between the Tokyo Metro Namboku Line and the Toei Mita Line.

Depending on the extent of agreements reached by the different operators, joint-use stations may feature a unified paid area, where ticket gates are shared between all operators serving the station, or separate paid areas, where different operators have individual paid areas, thus requiring commuters to exit a paid area and then enter another to transfer between different operators.

== North America ==
In North America, a union station is usually owned by a separate corporation whose shares are owned by the different railways which use it, so that the costs and benefits of its operations are shared proportionately among them. This contrasts with the system of trackage rights or running rights, where one railway company owns a line or facility, but allows another company to share it under a contractual agreement. However, the company that owns the union station and associated trackage does assign trackage rights to the railroads that use it. Many of the jointly owned stations were built by terminal railroads. Examples include the Ogden Union Railway & Depot Company, jointly owned by Southern Pacific and Union Pacific to manage the Ogden Union Station in Ogden, Utah; and the Denver Terminal Railway Company, representing the Denver & Rio Grande Western, Chicago Burlington & Quincy, Atchison Topeka & Santa Fe, Colorado & Southern and Chicago Rock Island & Pacific and the Union Pacific railways, which managed the station in Denver, Colorado.
