= Ebina =

Ebina 海老名市
- City
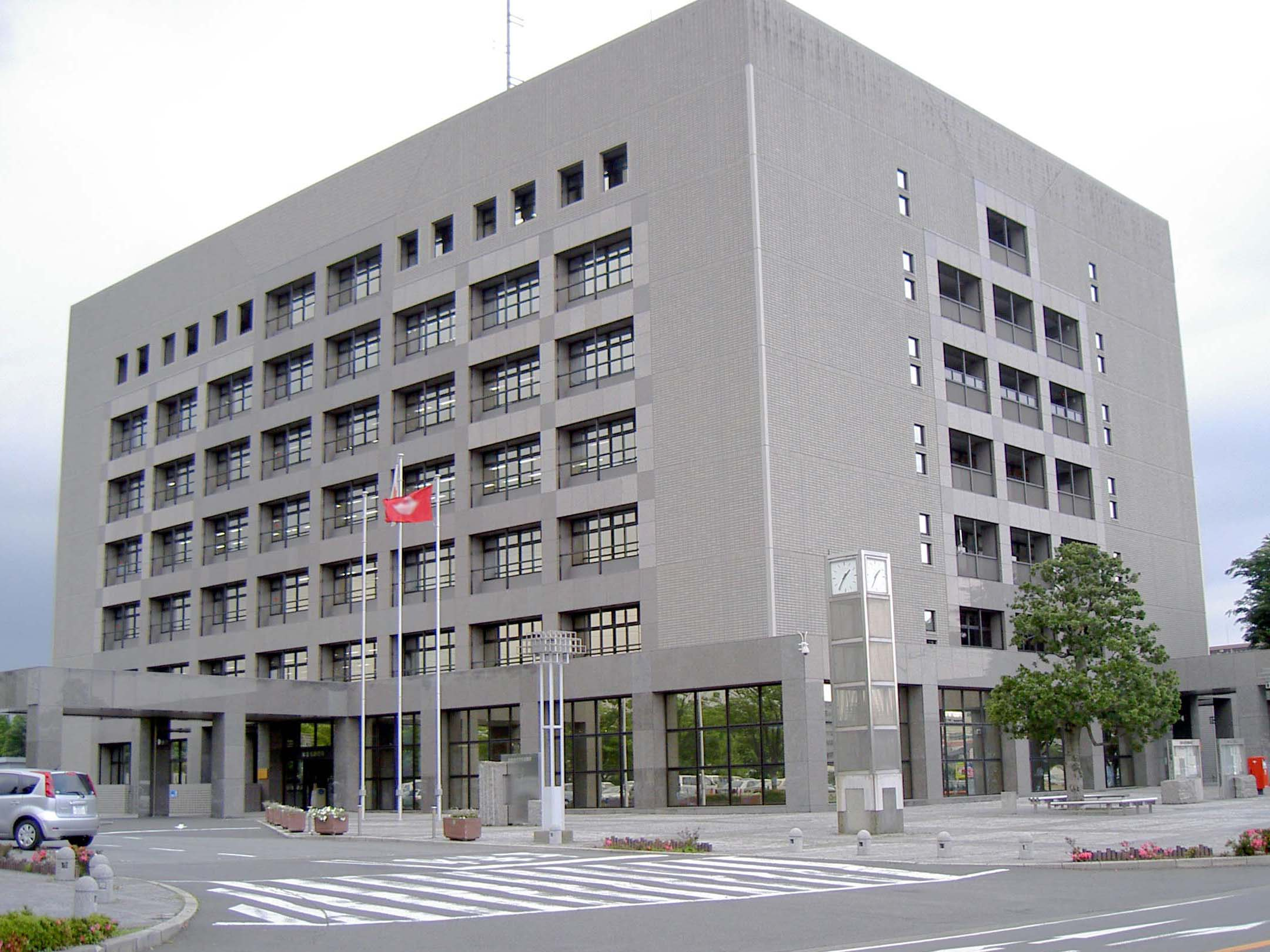
- Ebina City Hall

- Flag Seal

- Location of Ebina in Kanagawa Prefecture

- Coordinates: 35°26′47″N 139°23′27″E
- Country: Japan
- Region: Kantō
- Prefecture: Kanagawa Prefecture

Government
  - Mayor: Masaharu Uchino

Area
  - Total: 26.59 km^{2} (10.27 sq mi)

Population (October 1, 2024)
  - Total: 141,276
  - Density: 5,313/km^{2} (13,760/sq mi)
- Time zone: UTC+9 (Japan Standard Time)
- Phone number: 046-231-2111
- Address: 175-1 Katase, Ebina-shi, Kanagawa-ken 243-0492
- Climate: Cfa
- Website: Official website
- Symbols
- Bird: Greenfinch
- Flower: Azalea
- Tree: Box tree

Ebina (海老名市, Ebina-shi; Japanese pronunciation: [é̞.bʲì.nä̀, è̞.bʲí.nä́.ɕì]) is a city located in Kanagawa Prefecture, Japan.As of 1 October 2024, the city had an estimated population of 141,276 and a population density of 5300 persons per km^{2}. The total area of the city is 26.69 square kilometres (10.31 sq mi).

== Geography ==
Ebina is located approximately 50 kilometers from central Tokyo and 20 kilometers from Yokohama. The city is roughly rectangular, 8.7 kilometers north-to-south by 6.15 kilometers east-to-west, with an elevation of 11 to 84 meters above sea level. It is in the middle of the Sagami Plain, part of western Kantō Plain. The city sits on the eastern bank of the Sagami River, and the Hikiji River flows through part of the city. The Tōmei Expressway cuts across the southern end of the city.

=== Surrounding municipalities ===
Kanagawa Prefecture

- Atsugi
- Ayase
- Fujisawa
- Samukawa
- Yamato
- Zama

=== Climate ===
Ebina has a humid subtropical climate (Köppen Cfa) characterized by warm summers and cool winters with light to no snowfall. The average annual temperature in Ebina is 15.2 °C. The average annual rainfall is 1632 mm with September as the wettest month. The temperatures are highest on average in August, at around 25.6 °C, and lowest in January, at around 5.2 °C.

Climate data for Ebina (1991−2020 normals, extremes 1978−present)
Month	Jan	Feb	Mar	Apr	May	Jun	Jul	Aug	Sep	Oct	Nov	Dec	Year
Record high °C (°F)	20.3 (68.5)	25.3 (77.5)	25.2 (77.4)	31.0 (87.8)	33.4 (92.1)	37.6 (99.7)	38.3 (100.9)	39.9 (103.8)	37.6 (99.7)	33.4 (92.1)	26.6 (79.9)	24.4 (75.9)	38.1 (100.6)
Mean daily maximum °C (°F)	10.6 (51.1)	11.4 (52.5)	14.4 (57.9)	19.4 (66.9)	23.8 (74.8)	26.3 (79.3)	30.1 (86.2)	31.6 (88.9)	27.9 (82.2)	22.6 (72.7)	17.6 (63.7)	13.0 (55.4)	20.7 (69.3)
Daily mean °C (°F)	4.7 (40.5)	5.7 (42.3)	9.1 (48.4)	14.1 (57.4)	18.6 (65.5)	21.9 (71.4)	25.7 (78.3)	26.9 (80.4)	23.3 (73.9)	17.9 (64.2)	12.3 (54.1)	7.1 (44.8)	15.6 (60.1)
Mean daily minimum °C (°F)	−0.6 (30.9)	0.3 (32.5)	3.9 (39.0)	8.8 (47.8)	13.9 (57.0)	18.3 (64.9)	22.2 (72.0)	23.2 (73.8)	19.7 (67.5)	14.0 (57.2)	7.7 (45.9)	1.9 (35.4)	11.1 (52.0)
Record low °C (°F)	−7.7 (18.1)	−8.9 (16.0)	−5.6 (21.9)	−2.7 (27.1)	4.2 (39.6)	9.9 (49.8)	14.2 (57.6)	16.7 (62.1)	10.6 (51.1)	2.0 (35.6)	−1.5 (29.3)	−7.3 (18.9)	−8.9 (16.0)
Average precipitation mm (inches)	67.3 (2.65)	67.0 (2.64)	143.9 (5.67)	152.9 (6.02)	156.9 (6.18)	178.2 (7.02)	191.2 (7.53)	159.7 (6.29)	254.2 (10.01)	240.9 (9.48)	103.2 (4.06)	67.2 (2.65)	1,760.9 (69.33)
Average precipitation days (≥ 1.0 mm)	5.3	6.0	10.1	9.8	10.1	12.1	11.2	9.0	12.3	10.6	7.7	5.4	109.6
Mean monthly sunshine hours	190.8	168.2	166.5	175.0	178.4	123.2	156.7	189.8	132.4	133.2	150.5	179.7	1,946.9
Source: Japan Meteorological Agency

== Demographics ==
Per Japanese census data, the population of Ebina has grown steadily over the past century.

Historical population
Year	Pop.	±%
1920	8,891	—
1930	10,051	+13.0%
1940	10,552	+5.0%
1950	15,549	+47.4%
1960	17,938	+15.4%
1970	44,492	+148.0%
1980	77,498	+74.2%
1990	105,822	+36.5%
2000	117,519	+11.1%
2010	127,707	+8.7%
2020	136,516	+6.9%

== History ==
The area of modern Ebina has been settled since prehistoric times, and has a number of remains from the Kofun period. Ebina became the provincial capital of Sagami Province in the Nara period, and was the location of the kokubunji, or provincial temple. It was home to the Yokoyama clan, one of the seven warrior clans of the Musashi region during the early Kamakura period. During the Edo period, the lands around Ebina were tenryō territory theoretically administered directly by the Tokugawa Shogunate in Edo; however, in reality, the area was a patchwork of small fiefs held by various hatamoto, as well as exclaves under the control of Sakura Domain and Karasuyama Domain.

After the Meiji Restoration, the area became part of Kōza District, Kanagawa Prefecture and was administratively divided into Ebina Village and Arima Village on April 1, 1889 with the establishment of the modern municipalities system. The area was connected by rail in 1926 via the Sagami Railway and in 1927 by the Odakyu Electric Railway, leading to an increase in population and a change in status of Ebina from village to town in 1940. In 1955, Arima Village merged into Ebina Town. Ebina was elevated to city status on November 1, 1971. Urban development projects in the 1980s and 1990s have modernized the city center.

== Government ==
Ebina has a mayor-council form of government with a directly elected mayor and a unicameral city council of 22 members. Ebina contributes one member to the Kanagawa Prefectural Assembly. In terms of national politics, the city is part of Kanagawa 13th district of the lower house of the Diet of Japan.

== Economy ==
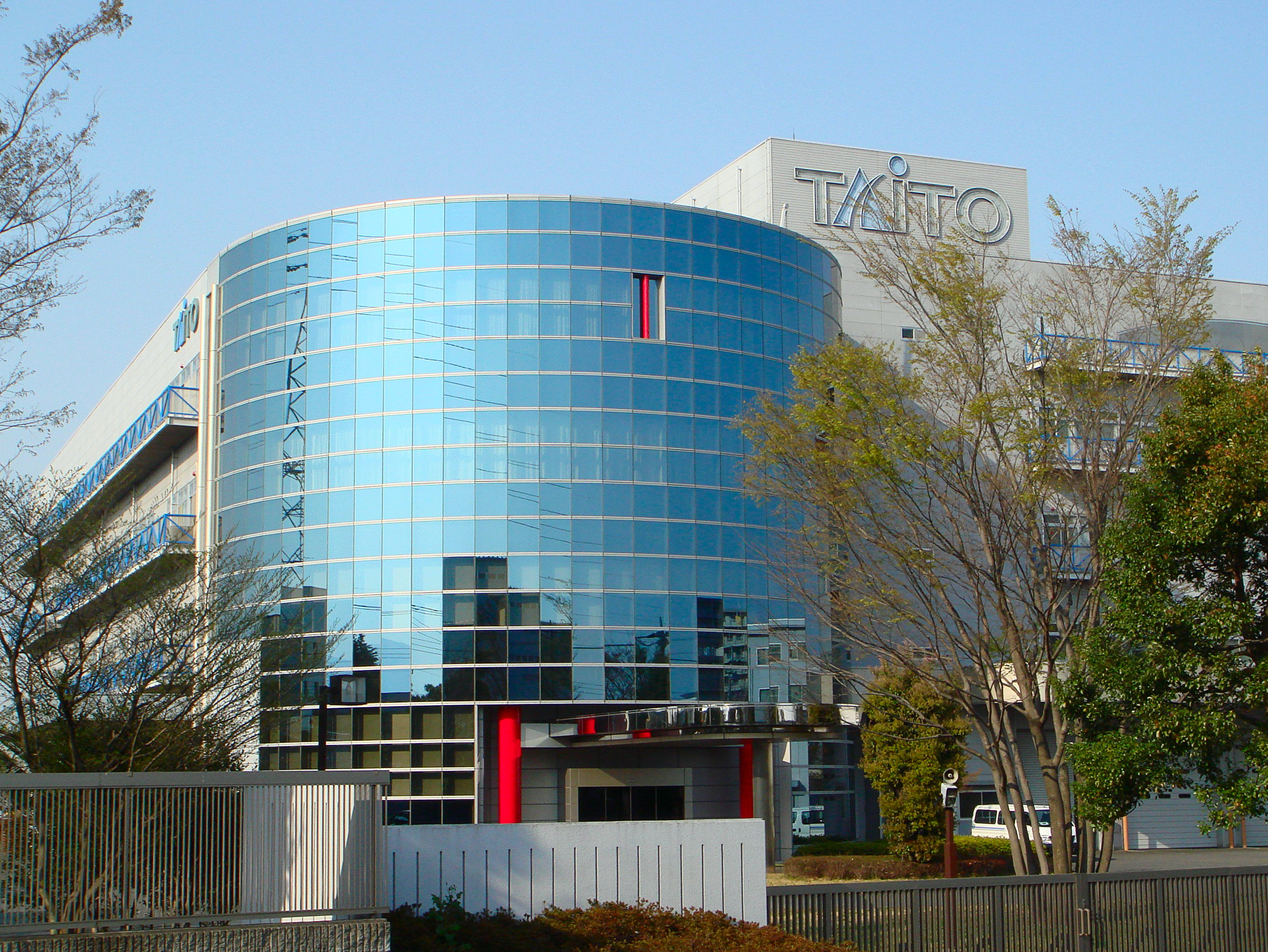
Taito Ebina Development Center

Ebina is home to over 150 factories. The town is a center of the production of electrical appliances, metal products, and machinery. Taito operates the Ebina Development Center in Ebina. The city was once known for its broad rice paddies, but agriculture now centers on the cultivation of strawberries, tomatoes, and ornamental plants. Ebina serves as a bedroom community to the greater Tokyo and Yokohama area.

== Education ==
Ebina has 13 public elementary schools and six public middle schools operated by the city government. The city has three public high schools operated by the Kanagawa Prefectural Board of Education, and the prefecture also operates two special education schools for the handicapped.

== Transportation ==
=== Railway ===
JR East – Sagami Line

  - Ebina–Atsugi–Shake–Kadosawabashi

Odakyu Electric Railway – Odakyū Odawara Line

- Ebina–Atsugi

Sagami Railway – Sagami Railway Main Line

- Ebina–Kashiwadai–Sagamino

=== Highway ===
- Tōmei Expressway - Ebina Service Area - Ebina Junction
- Shin-Tōmei Expressway - Ebina-minami Junction
- Ken-Ō Expressway - Ebina-minami Junction - Ebina Interchange - Ebina Junction
- National Route 246

== Local attractions ==
- Sagami Kokubun-ji, provincial temple of Sagami Province and national historic site
- Ebina Premium Film Festival (held annually in autumn)

== Notable people from Ebina ==
- Riko Gunji, badminton player
- Takashi Kamoshida, Japanese football player (Fukushima United FC, J3 League)
- Kensuke Kitahama, professional shogi player, ranked 8-dan
- Akiko Kijimuta, former professional tennis player
- Naoko Kijimuta, former professional tennis player
- Syuri Kondo mononymously known as Syuri, professional wrestler, shoot boxer, kickboxer and mixed martial artist
- Miyu Nagasaki, table tennis player
- Haruma Saikyo, kickboxer
- Yukiya Yokoyama, former Nippon Professional Baseball pitcher
- Yuma Okuda, Japanese football player
- ZUN, video game creator
