= Ebina Service Area =

Rest area in Ebina, Kanagawa, Japan

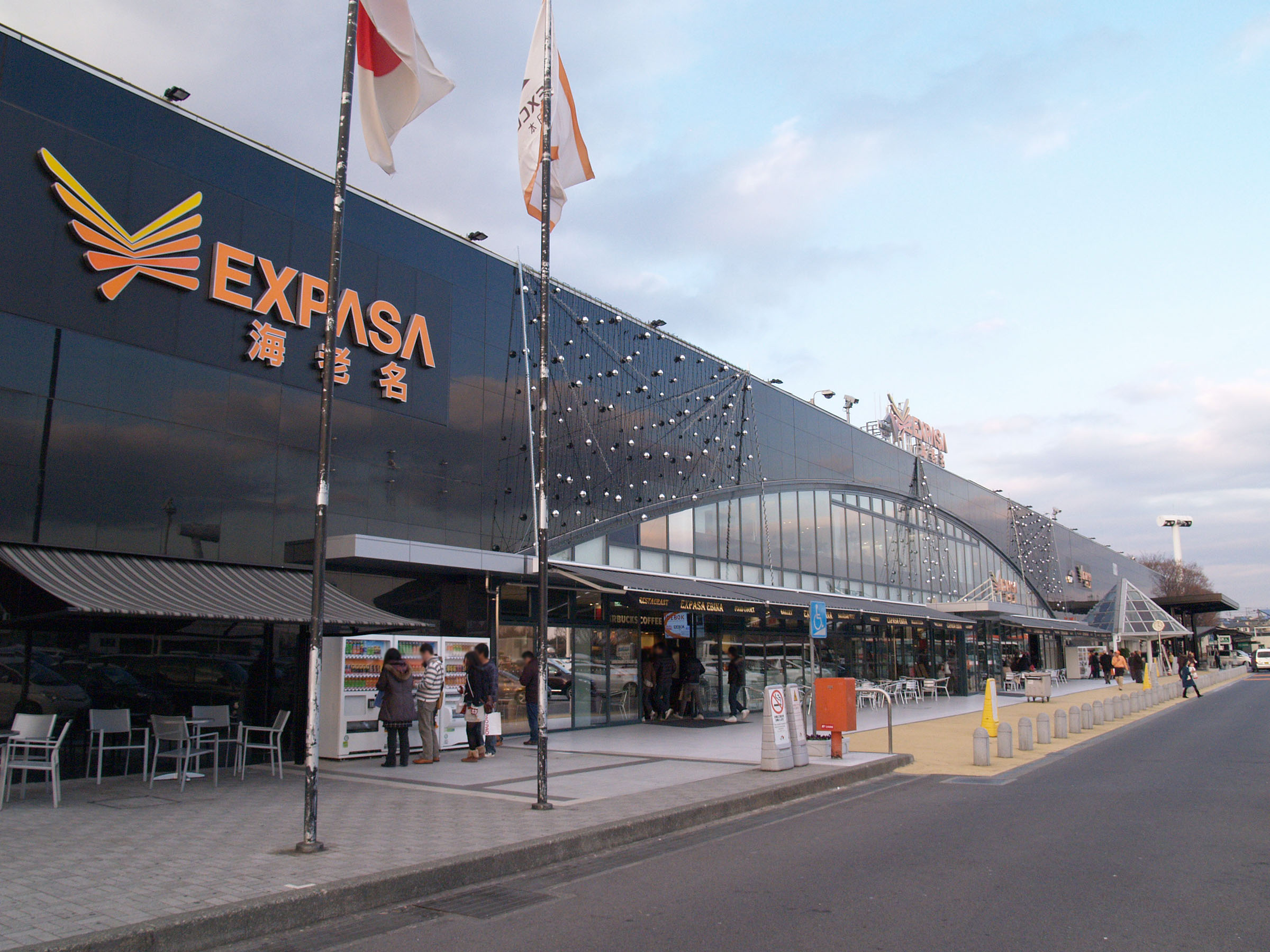

- Location within Kanagawa Prefecture

Information
- Native name: 海老名サービスエリア
- Road: Tōmei Expressway
- Location: Ebina, Kanagawa, Japan
- Coordinates: 35°25′53.6″N 139°24′0.5″E

The Ebina Service Area (海老名サービスエリア, Ebina Sābisueria) is a rest area located on the Tōmei Expressway in Ebina, Kanagawa Prefecture, Japan, and is operated by Central Nippon Expressway Company. It is the only service area in Kanagawa, the first service area when coming from Tokyo, and the last service area when heading from Nagoya to Tokyo.

== Overview ==
The ideal spacing between service areas on the Tōmei Expressway is considered to be about every 50 km (31 mi) based on the results of the Meishin Expressway, but this service area is located at a point of about 30 km (19 mi) from Tokyo. This is because when the Tōmei Expressway was opened, the basic round-trip 4-lane route also had six lanes east of Atsugi, so in consideration of heavy traffic, a service area was installed on the east side of Atsugi. To the west of this, service areas are provided approximately every 50 km (31 mi). For the Ebina Service Area, pedestrians can enter and exit from general roads on both the upper and lower lines, and there is also an "EXPASA Ebina" stop on the general road for the Ebina City Community Bus (Otani/Sugikubo route).

The average number of users of the Ebina Service Area is about 60,000 per day on the upper and lower lines, which is the highest in the country, and the parking lot is often full during busy hours on holidays. Therefore, a parking zone dedicated to large buses is set up. In addition, in the service area sales ranking in 2005, the down line of this service area was in first place, the up line was second place.
