= Shake Station =

Railway station in Ebina, Kanagawa Prefecture, Japan

Shake Station 社家駅
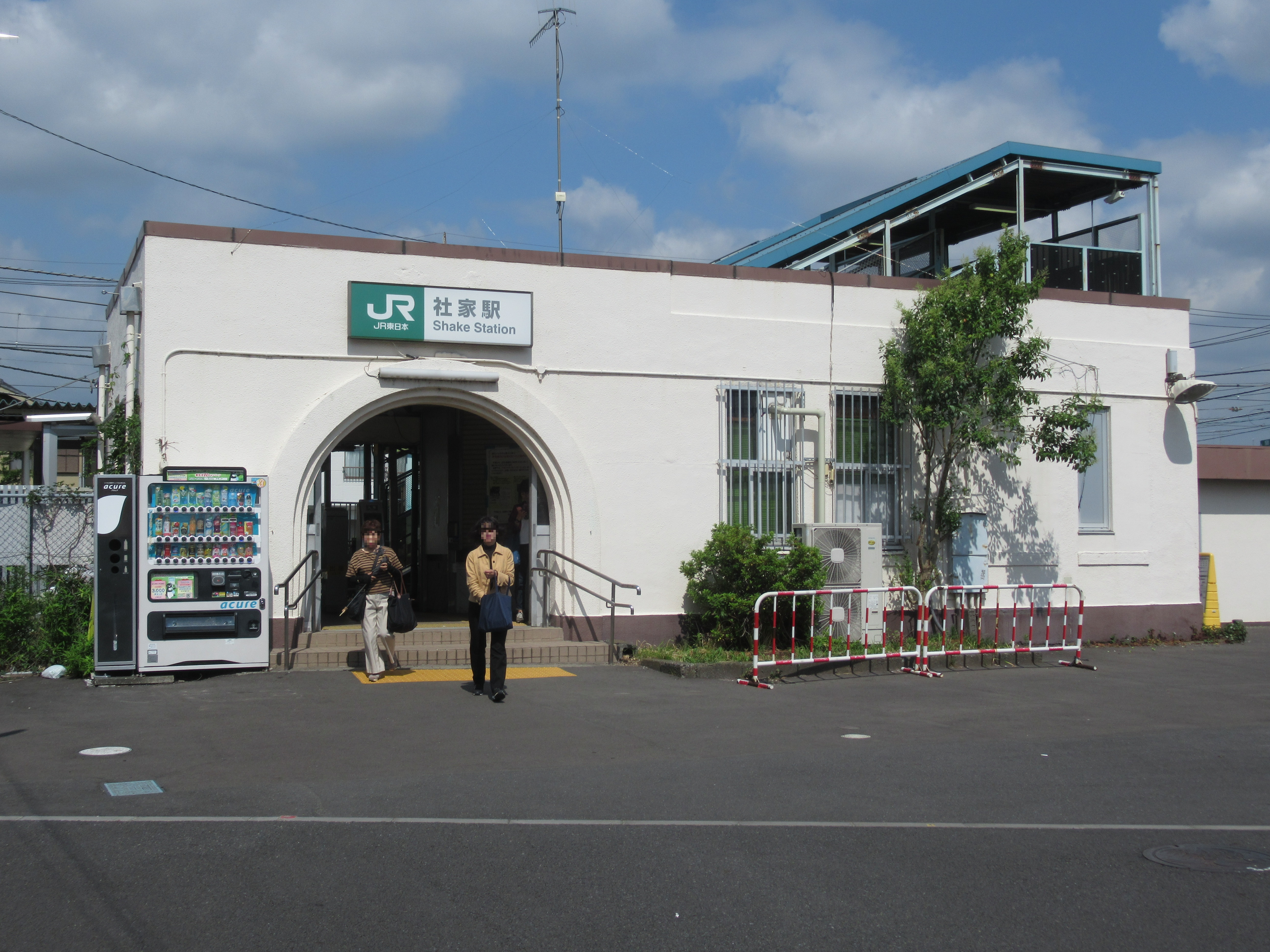
- Shake Station, June 2018

General information
- Location: Shake 115, Ebina-shi, Kanagawa-ken 243-0424; Japan
- Coordinates: 35°25′13″N 139°22′38″E
- Operator: JR East
- Line: ■ Sagami Line
- Distance: 11.6 km from Chigasaki.
- Platforms: 1 island platform
- Connections

Other information
- Status: Unstaffed
- Website: Official website

History
- Opened: July 15, 1926

Passengers
- FY2014: 2,101 daily

Services
Preceding station	JR East	Following station
Atsugi towards Hachiōji	Sagami Line	Kadosawabashi towards Chigasaki
Location
- Location within Kanagawa Prefecture Location within Japan

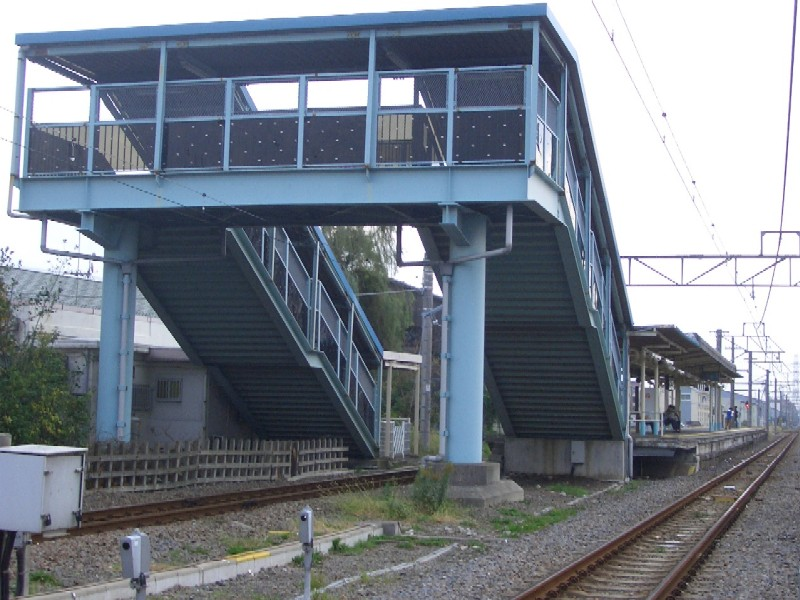
Shake Station in 2004

Shake Station (社家駅, Shake-eki) is a passenger railway station located in the city of Ebina, Kanagawa Prefecture, Japan, operated by the East Japan Railway Company (JR East).

== Lines ==
Shake Station is served by the Sagami Line and is located 11.6 km from the southern terminus of the line at Chigasaki.

== Station layout ==
The station consists of a single island platform connected by a footbridge to a small station building. The station is unattended.

=== Platforms ===
1	■ Sagami Line	For Samukawa, Chigasaki
2	■ Sagami Line	For Atsugi, Hashimoto and Hachiōji

== History ==
Shake Station was opened on July 15, 1926, as station on the Sagami Railway. On June 1, 1944, the Sagami Railway was nationalized and merged with the Japan National Railways. Scheduled freight services were discontinued in 1962, as were most passenger operations, with the station used primarily for train maintenance and schedule adjustment. On April 1, 1987, with the dissolution and privatization of the Japan National Railways, the station came under the operation of JR East. Automated turnstiles using the Suica IC card system came into operation from November 2001.

== Passenger statistics ==
In fiscal 2014, the station was used by an average of 2,101 passengers daily (boarding passengers only).

== Surrounding area ==
- Coca-Cola Japan Ebina Factory
- Kanagawa Prefectural Arima High School
- Shake Elementary School

== See also ==
- List of railway stations in Japan
