= Japan National Route 473 =

Road in Japan

National Route 473
- 国道473号

Route information
- Length: 247.8 km (154.0 mi)
- Existed: 1 April 1993–present

Major junctions
- West end: National Route 23 in Gamagōri
- East end: National Route 150 in Makinohara

Location
- Country: Japan

Highway system
- National highways of Japan; Expressways of Japan
| ← National Route 472 | → National Route 474 |

National Route 473 is a national highway of Japan connecting Gamagōri and Makinohara in Japan. It has a total length of 247.8 km (153.98 mi).
