= E54 =

E54 may refer to:

- European route E54, a road
- A variation of the Nimzo-Indian Defence, Gligoric System, Encyclopaedia of Chess Openings code
- Onomichi Expressway and Matsue Expressway, route E54 in Japan
