= Hiroshima Expressway =

Hiroshima Expressway may refer to:

- Hiroshima Expressway (urban expressway), a Japanese urban expressway
- Hiroshima Expressway (West Nippon Expressway Company), a Japanese expressway operated by the West Nippon Expressway Company
