= E74 =

E74 may refer to:

- European route E74
- King's Indian Defence, Encyclopaedia of Chess Openings code
- Hiroshima Expressway and Hamada Expressway, route E74 in Japan

== See also ==
- Xbox 360 technical problems#E74 error
