= E75 =

E75 or E-75 may refer to:

== Arts and Entertainment ==
- King's Indian Defense, Encyclopaedia of Chess Openings code

== Military ==
- E-75 Standardpanzer, a German World War II tank version in the Entwicklung series

== Science and Technology ==
- Nokia E75, a mobile phone
- WHO classification of a Lysosomal storage disease
- E75, one of the Common ethanol fuel mixtures
- The peptide component of the NeuVax cancer vaccine

== Transportation ==
- European route E75, a road
- Higashihiroshima-Kure Expressway, route E75 in Japan
- The E175, a member of the Embraer E-Jet family
