= E29 =

E29 may refer to:

- European route E29
- HMS E29
- E29 screw, a type of Edison screw
- E29 Seremban–Port Dickson Highway
- Harima Expressway and Tottori Expressway, route E29 in Japan
