= San'yō Expressway =

Expressway in Japan

San'yō Expressway
- 山陽自動車道

Route information
- Part of AH1
- Length: 446.7 km (277.6 mi) 405.6 km (main line); 9.6 km (Miki branch line); 3.4 km (Hanshin branch line); 28.1 km (Ube branch line)
- Existed: 1982-1997–present

Major junctions
- From: Kobe JCT(Kobe 神戸, Hyōgo)
- To: Yamaguchi JCT(Yamaguchi 山口, Yamaguchi); Shimonoseki JCT(Shimonoseki 下関, Yamaguchi)

Location
- Country: Japan
- Major cities: Kobe, Himeji, Okayama, Fukuyama, Hiroshima, Iwakuni, Yamaguchi

Highway system
- National highways of Japan; Expressways of Japan

The San'yō Expressway (山陽自動車道, San'yō Jidōshadō) (Asian Highway Network AH1) is an expressway in Japan, running from Kobe through Hiroshima along the Inland Sea and terminating in Yamaguchi Prefecture. The entire length of the expressway was opened in 1997. The main line has a total length of 405.6 kilometers.

== List of interchanges and features ==
- IC - interchange, SIC - smart interchange, JCT - junction, SA - service area, PA - parking area, BS - bus stop, TN - tunnel, TB - toll gate, BR - bridge
- Bus stops labeled "○" are currently in use; those marked "◆" are closed.

=== Main Route ===
Number	Name	Connections	Distance from Kōbe (km)	Bus Stop	Notes	Location	
Through to Shin-Meishin Expressway
(5-1)	Kōbe JCT	Chūgoku Expressway	0.0			Kita-ku, Kobe	Hyōgo
1	Kōbe-Kita IC/ Hata BS	Rokkō-Kita Toll Road	2.6	○		Kita-ku, Kobe	Hyōgo
-	Ōgō PA	-	7.3			Kita-ku, Kobe	Hyōgo
-	Ōgō BS	-	12.3	○		Kita-ku, Kobe	Hyōgo
2	Miki JCT	for Akashi Kaikyō Bridge (Kimi Branch)	15.4			Miki	Hyōgo
-	Shijimi BS	-	16.8	○		Miki	Hyōgo
3	Miki-Higashi IC	Hyōgo Prefectural Route 85	18.0			Miki	Hyōgo
-	Kurumi BS	-	23.1	○		Miki	Hyōgo
-	Miki SA	-	25.5			Miki	Hyōgo
4	Miki-Ono IC	National Route 175 (Miki-Ono Bypass)	27.7			Miki	Hyōgo
-	Ono BS	-	30.2	○		Ono	Hyōgo
-	Gongenko PA	-	36.1; 36.5	○	for Kobe, Osaka for Okayama	Kakogawa	Hyōgo
5	Kakogawa-Kita IC	Hyōgo Prefectural Route 43	41.2			Kakogawa	Hyōgo
-	Shikitō BS	-	46.5	○		Himeji	Hyōgo
6	San'yō Himeji-Higashi IC	National Route 372; Bantan Renraku Road	49.8			Himeji	Hyōgo
-	Shiratori PA	-	60.7; 61.6	○	for Kobe, Osaka for Okayama	Himeji	Hyōgo
7	San'yō Himeji-Nishi IC	National Route 29 (Himeji-Nishi Bypass)	62.7			Himeji	Hyōgo
8	Tatsuno IC	Hyōgo Prefectural Route 29	69.3	○		Tatsuno	Hyōgo
9	Tatsuno-Nishi IC/SA	Hyōgo Prefectural Route 93; Hyōgo Prefectural Route 121	73.7			Tatsuno	Hyōgo
9-1	Harima JCT	Harima Expressway	74.7			Tatsuno	Hyōgo
-	Aioi BS	-	78.3	○		Aioi	Hyōgo
10	Akō IC	Okayama/Hyōgo Prefectural Route 96	88.3	○		Akō	Hyōgo
-	Fukuishi PA	-	95.0			Bizen	Okayama
11	Bizen IC	National Route 2	98.8			Bizen	Okayama
12	Wake IC	National Route 374	109.1			Wake District, Wake	Okayama
-	Seto PA	-	116.9; 117.7		for Kobe for Okayama, Hiroshima	Higashi-ku, Okayama	Okayama
-	Seto JCT	Mimasaka-Okayama Road (planned)	119.3		Expected to open in 2022	Higashi-ku, Okayama	Okayama
13	San'yō IC	Okayama Prefectural Route 37	123.2	△		Akaiwa	Okayama
-	Kasaiyama Tunnel	-				Kita-ku, Okayama	Okayama
14	Okayama IC	National Route 53 (Okayama-Kita Bypass)	136.8	△		Kita-ku, Okayama	Okayama
14-1	Kibi SA/SIC		138.4			Kita-ku, Okayama	Okayama
15	Okayama JCT	Okayama Expressway	143.9	-		Kita-ku, Okayama	Okayama
16	Kurashiki JCT	for Seto-Chūō Expressway (Hayashima Branch)	150.3	-		Kurashiki	Okayama
17	Kurashiki IC	National Route 429	152.4			Kurashiki	Okayama
18	Tamashima IC	Okayama Prefectural Route 54	161.9			Kurashiki	Okayama
-	Michiguchi PA	-	166.5			Kurashiki	Okayama
19	Kamogata IC	Okayama Prefectural Route 155	171.9			Asakuchi	Okayama
20	Kasaoka IC	Okayama Prefectural Route 34	180.1			Kasaoka	Okayama
-	Shinosaka PA	-	185.3			Kasaoka	Okayama
21	Fukuyama-Higashi IC	National Route 182 (Fukuyama Loop Road)	191.7			Fukuyama	Hiroshima
-	Senda BS	-	194.4	○		Fukuyama	Hiroshima
21-1	Fukuyama SA/SIC		200.3; 200.5		For Okayama, Osaka for Hiroshima	Fukuyama	Hiroshima
-	Fukuyama-Hongō BS	-	207.6	○		Fukuyama	Hiroshima
22	Fukuyama-Nishi IC	National Route 2 (Matsunaga Bypass)	208.6			Fukuyama	Hiroshima
22-1	Onomichi JCT	Onomichi Expressway	213.1			Onomichi	Hiroshima
23	Onomichi IC	National Route 184	214.5			Onomichi	Hiroshima
-	Yahata PA	-	222.2; 222.5		For Hiroshima, Kitakyūshū for Okayama	Mihara	Hiroshima
24	Mihara-Kui IC	National Route 486; Hiroshima Prefectural Route 25	227.2			Mihara	Hiroshima
-	Takasaka PA	-	231.4	☆	BS for connections only expressway entrance/exit prohibited	Mihara	Hiroshima
24-1	Hongō IC	Hiroshima Prefectural Route 82	238.5			Mihara	Hiroshima
25	Kōchi IC	Hiroshima Prefectural Route 73; National Route 432	246.7	○		Higashihiroshima	Hiroshima
-	Kodani SA	-	249.7; 250.0		For Hiroshima, Kitakyūshū for Fukuyama, Okayama	Higashihiroshima	Hiroshima
25-1	Takaya JCT	Higashihiroshima-Kure Expressway	252.8			Higashihiroshima	Hiroshima
26	Saijō IC	Hiroshima Prefectural Route 59; National Route 375 (Misonō Bypass)	257.8	◆		Higashihiroshima	Hiroshima
27	Shiwa IC	Hiroshima Prefectural Route 83	268.8	◆		Higashihiroshima	Hiroshima
-	Okuya PA	-	270.9			Higashihiroshima	Hiroshima
28-1 28	Hiroshima-Higashi IC	Hiroshima Expressway Route 1 Hiroshima Prefectural Route 70	279.2	○		Higashi-ku, Hiroshima	Hiroshima
29	Hiroshima IC	National Route 54 (Gion Bypass)	285.6			Asaminami-ku, Hiroshima	Hiroshima
-	Numata PA	-	291.2	○		Asaminami-ku, Hiroshima	Hiroshima
30	Hiroshima JCT	Hiroshima Expressway	293.1			Asaminami-ku, Hiroshima	Hiroshima
31	Itsukaichi IC	Hiroshima Prefectural Route 71	296.1			Saeki-ku, Hiroshima	Hiroshima
31-1	Miyajima SA/SIC		306.2			Hatsukaichi	Hiroshima
32	Hatsukaichi JCT	Hiroshima-Iwakuni Road for Hatsukaichi, Miyajima	310.4			Hatsukaichi	Hiroshima
32-2	Ōno IC	Hiroshima Prefectural Route 289	315.1	◆		Hatsukaichi	Hiroshima
32-3	Ōtake IC	National Route 2	323.4			Ōtake	Hiroshima
<33>	Ōtake JCT	National Route 2 Iwakuni-Ōtake Road (planned)	324.1			Ōtake	Hiroshima
-	Sekido Tunnel	-			Ōsaka-bound 3,325 m Kitakyūshū-bound 3,217 m	Iwakuni	Yamaguchi
34	Iwakuni IC	National Route 2 Yamaguchi/Hiroshima Prefectural Route 1	332.6	◆		Iwakuni	Yamaguchi
-	Kuga PA	-	344.2			Iwakuni	Yamaguchi
35	Kuga IC	Yamaguchi Prefectural Route 70	346.7	○		Iwakuni	Yamaguchi
36	Kumage IC	Yamaguchi Prefectural Route 8	358.9	○		Shūnan	Yamaguchi
-	Kudamatsu SA	-	364.8			Kudamatsu	Yamaguchi
-	Mimitori Tunnel	-			Ōsaka-bound 67 m Kitakyūshū-bound 72 m	Shūnan	Yamaguchi
37	Tokuyama-Higashi IC	National Route 2 (Shūnan Bypass)	370.7	○		Shūnan	Yamaguchi
38	Tokuyama-Nishi IC	National Route 2	388.7			Shūnan	Yamaguchi
-	Tonomi PA	-	392.2			Hōfu	Yamaguchi
39	Hōfu-Higashi IC	National Route 2 (Hōfu Bypass)	401.3		for Hiroshima	Hōfu	Yamaguchi
40	Hōfu-Nishi IC	National Route 2 (Hōfu Bypass)	404.6	△	for Kitakyūshū	Hōfu	Yamaguchi
-	Sabagawa SA	-	407.5			Hōfu	Yamaguchi
41	Yamaguchi-Minami IC	National Route 2 (Ogōri Bypass)	413.2			Yamaguchi	Yamaguchi
(33)	Yamaguchi JCT	Chūgoku Expressway	419.3	-		Yamaguchi	Yamaguchi

=== Kimi Branch ===
Number	Name	Connections	Distance from Miki (km)	Notes	Location
2	Miki JCT	Main Route	0.0		Miki
1	Kōbe-Nishi IC/TB	Hyōgo Prefectural Route 22	9.6	TB is on Miki-bound side	Nishi-ku, Kobe
Kobe-Awaji-Naruto Expressway for Tokushima

=== Hayashima Branch ===
Number	Name	Connections	Distance from Kurashiki (km)	Bus Stop	Notes	Location
16	Kurashiki JCT	for Hiroshima, Kōbe (Main Route)	0.0	-		Kurashiki
1	Hayashima IC/TB	National Route 2 (Okayama Bypass)	3.4	◆	Toll gate is on Kōbe/Hiroshima-bound side	Hayashima, Tsukubo District
Seto-Chūō Expressway for Kojima, Sakaide

=== Ube-Shimonoseki Route ===
Number	Name	Connections	Distance from Ube (km)	Bus Stop	Location
42	Ube JCT	Yamaguchi-Ube Road	0.0	-	Ube
43	Ube IC	National Route 490	3.1	○	Ube
44	Onoda IC	Yamaguchi Prefectural Route 71	13.2	○	Sanyoonoda
-	Suōnada PA	-	20.6	○	Sanyoonoda
45	Habe IC	National Route 2 (Asa-Habu Bypass)	22.7		Sanyoonoda
(35-2)	Shimonoseki JCT	Chūgoku Expressway	28.1	-	Shimonoseki
