= E73 =

E73 may refer to:

- European route E73
- King's Indian Defense, Encyclopaedia of Chess Openings code
- Okayama Expressway and Yonago Expressway, route E73 in Japan
