= Chūgoku Expressway =

Road in Japan

Chūgoku Expressway
- 中国自動車道

Route information
- Part of AH1
- Length: 540.1 km (335.6 mi)
- Existed: 1970–present

Major junctions
- From: Suita Junction in Suita, Osaka; Meishin Expressway; Kinki Expressway
- To: Shimonoseki Interchange in Shimonoseki, Yamaguchi; Kyushu Expressway

Location
- Country: Japan
- Major cities: Takarazuka, Kobe, Tsuyama, Niimi, Miyoshi, Hiroshima, Yamaguchi

Highway system
- National highways of Japan; Expressways of Japan

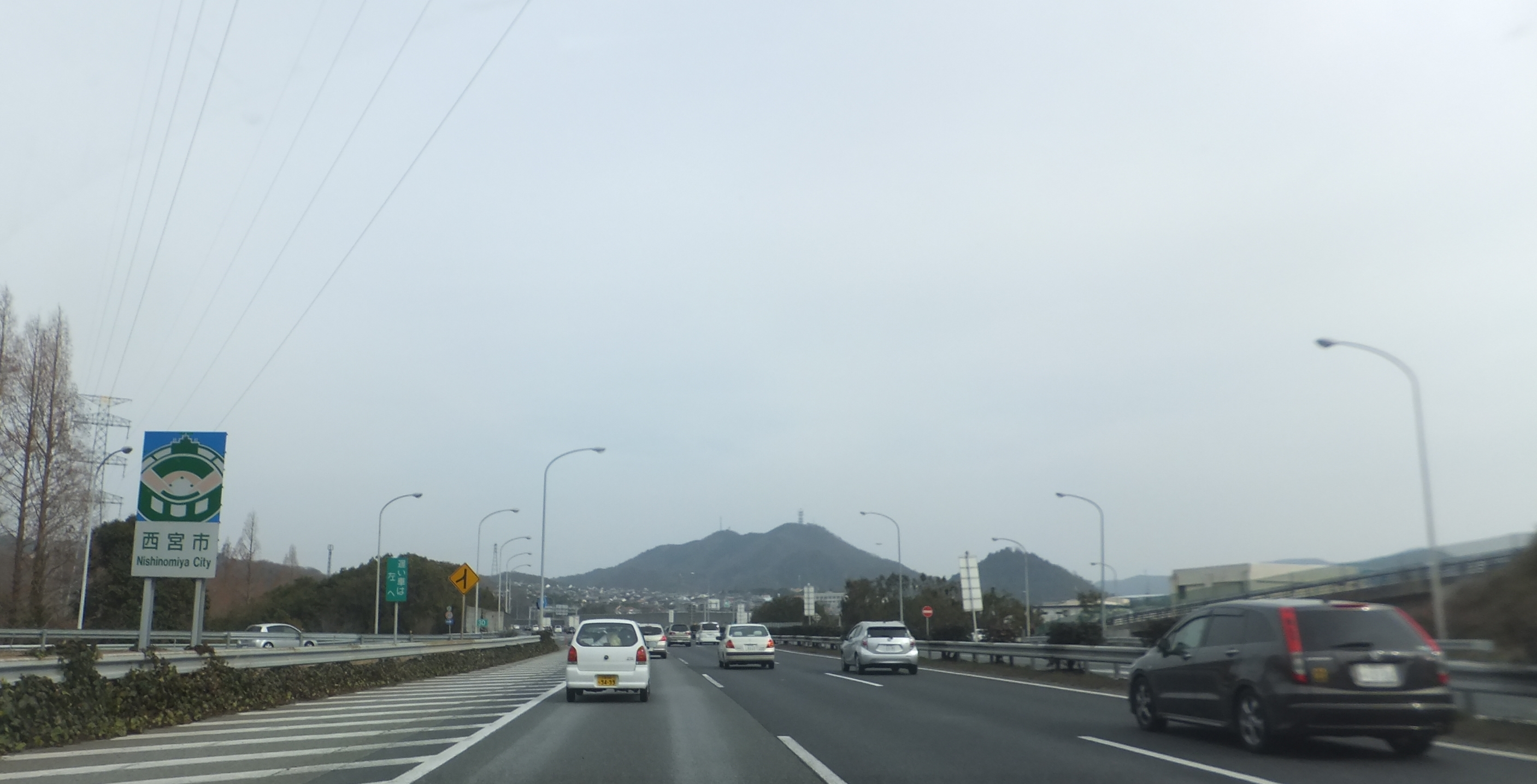
Nishinomiya, Hyōgo, Japan

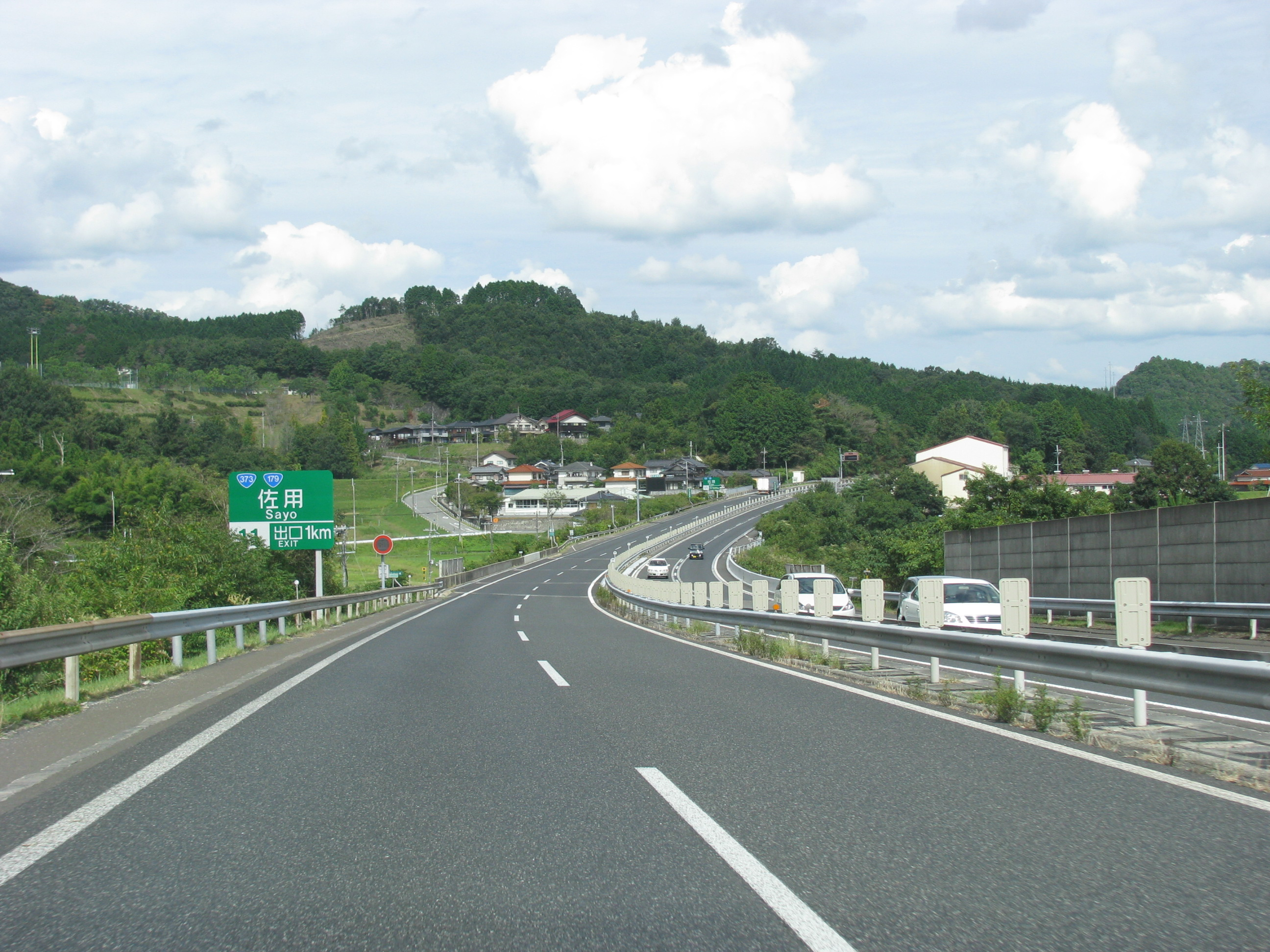
Sayo, Hyōgo, Japan

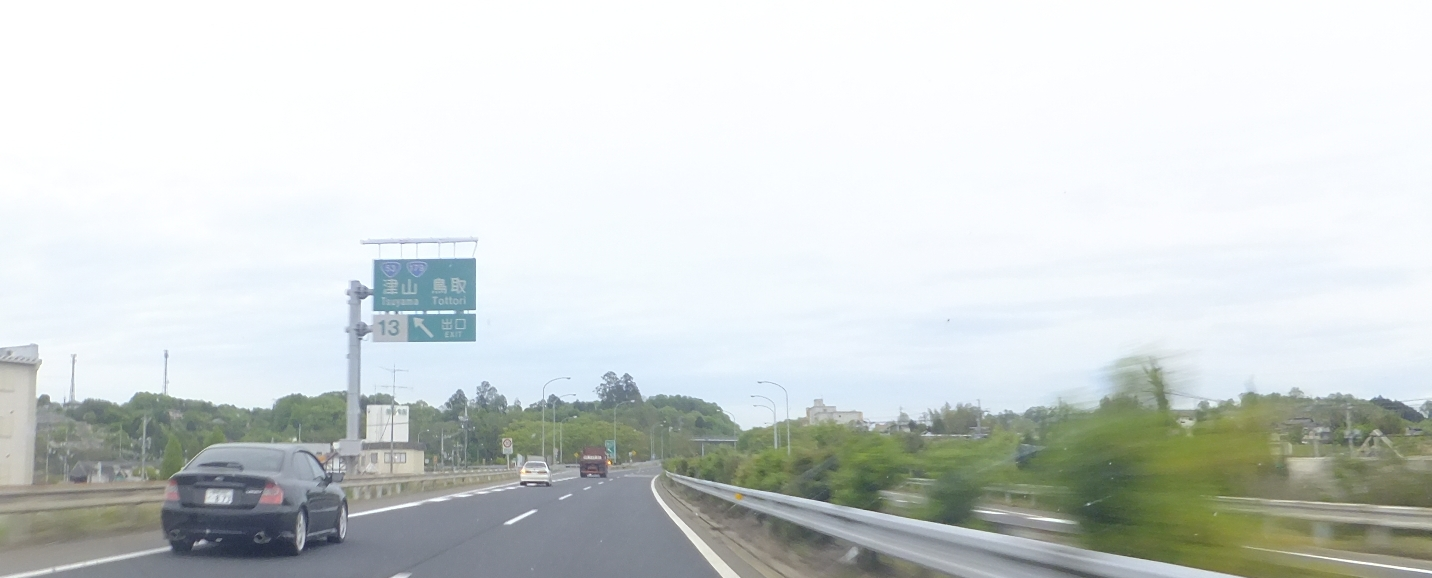
Tsuyama, Okayama, Japan

The Chūgoku Expressway (中国自動車道, Chūgoku Jidōsha-dō) (part of Asian Highway Network AH1) is an expressway in Japan, which extends from Suita, Osaka to Shimonoseki, Yamaguchi, connecting the Kansai and Chūgoku regions in western Honshu, Japan's main island. Other major cities along the expressway are Tsuyama, Kobe, and Hiroshima. It has a total length of 540.1 kilometers (335.6 mi).

The expressway runs through the Chugoku Mountains for most of its route, resulting in numerous sharp curves and steep grades. Much of the expressway has a posted speed limit of 80 km/h, with one segment restricted to 60 km/h.

It is connected with many other expressways, including the Meishin Expressway at Suita Junction and Kanmon Bridge at Shimonoseki Interchange through to the Kyushu Expressway.

== History ==
The expressway's first segment opened on 1 March 1970, between Suita and Toyonaka in the Osaka suburbs, which were then hosting Expo '70. This first segment was extended west to Takarazuka in July. The remainder of the expressway opened in stages over the next 13 years, with the final segments around Hiroshima opening on 24 March 1983.

The Chugoku Expressway was the primary expressway through western Honshu until the completion of the San'yo Expressway in the 1990s. Most through traffic migrated to the new expressway in 1997, making the Chugoku Expressway primarily relevant as a reliever route and for traffic to cities in the mountains along its route, as well as on the Sea of Japan coast.

Since privatization in 2005, the expressway has been under the management of the West Nippon Expressway Company.

== List of interchanges and features ==
- IC - interchange, SIC - smart interchange, JCT - junction, SA - service area, PA - parking area, BS - bus stop, TN - tunnel, TB - toll gate, BR - bridge
- Bus stops labeled "○" are currently in use; those marked "◆" are closed.

Number	Name	Connections	Distance from Origin (km)	Bus Stop	Notes	Location	
(35)	Suita JCT	Meishin Expressway; Kinki Expressway	0.0		Chugoku Expwy←→Nishinomiya: no access	Suita	Osaka
1	Chūgoku-Suita IC	Osaka Prefectural Route 2 (Osaka Chūō Loop Road)	1.0		eastbound exit, westbound entrance	Suita	Osaka
2	Chūgoku-Toyonaka IC	Osaka Prefectural Route 2 (Osaka Chūō Loop Road)	8.3		westbound exit, eastbound entrance	Toyonaka	Osaka
2	Chūgoku-Ikeda IC	National Route 176 (Bypass)	10.5		eastbound exit, westbound entrance	Ikeda	Osaka
3	Takarazuka IC	National Route 176 (Bypass); Hyōgo Prefectural Route 42	16.6	○		Takarazuka	Hyōgo
-	Takarazuka-Higashi Tunnel	-	18.3			Takarazuka	Hyōgo
-	Takarazuka-Nishi Tunnel	-	20.1			Takarazuka	Hyōgo
-	Nishinomiya-Najio SA	-	24.1	◆		Nishinomiya	Hyōgo
4	Nishinomiya-Yamaguchi JCT	Kita-Kobe Route	27.1		westbound exit, eastbound entrance	Nishinomiya	Hyōgo
5	Nishinomiya-Kita IC	Hyōgo Prefectural Route 82	29.8	○		Nishinomiya	Hyōgo
5-1	Kobe JCT	Shin-Meishin Expressway; Sanyō Expressway	31.6		for Shin-Meishin Expwy:opening in 2017	Kita-ku, Kobe	Hyōgo
-	Nagao BS	-	33.6	○		Kita-ku, Kobe	Hyōgo
5-2	Kobe Sanda IC	Rokko-Kita Road	36.7			Kita-ku, Kobe	Hyōgo
-	Akamatsu PA	-	38.4			Kita-ku, Kobe	Hyōgo
6	Yokawa JCT	Maizuru-Wakasa Expressway	40.3			Miki	Hyōgo
7	Yokawa IC	National Route 428; Hyōgo Prefectural Route 17	43.7	○		Miki	Hyōgo
7-1	Hyōgo-Tōjō IC	Hyōgo Prefectural Route 91; Hyōgo Prefectural Route 313	47.7			Katō	Hyōgo
-	Tōjō BS	-	49.7	○		Katō	Hyōgo
-	Yashiro PA	-	55.8	○		Katō	Hyōgo
8	Takino-Yashiro IC	National Route 175 (Yashiro Bypass); Hyōgo Prefectural Route 17	59.4	○		Katō	Hyōgo
-	Izumi BS	-	66.6	○		Kasai	Hyōgo
8-1	Kasai IC	Hyōgo Prefectural Route 24	69.1	○		Kasai	Hyōgo
-	Hōjō BS	-	72.2	○		Kasai	Hyōgo
-	Kasai PA	-	75.6			Kasai	Hyōgo
-	Kasai PA	-	75.6			Fukusaki	Hyōgo
9	Fukusaki IC	Bantan Renraku Road	79.2	○		Fukusaki	Hyōgo
9-1	Yumesaki BS/SIC	Hyōgo Prefectural Route 23	86.0	○		Himeji	Hyōgo
-	Yasutomi PA	-	94.5	○		Himeji	Hyōgo
10	Yamasaki IC	National Route 29	99.6	○		Shiso	Hyōgo
-	Yamasaki JCT	Harima Expressway (planned)	103.3		planned for 2020	Shiso	Hyōgo
-	Yamasaki TB	-	103.9		abandoned on December 20, 2004	Shiso	Hyōgo
-	Ibogawa PA	-	106.6			Shiso	Hyōgo
-	Kazurane BS	-	110.2	○		Shiso	Hyōgo
-	Nankō BS	-	113.8	○		Sayō	Hyōgo
10-1	Sayō JCT	Tottori Expressway	117.2			Sayō	Hyōgo
11	Sayō IC	National Route 373	119.2	○		Sayō	Hyōgo
-	Kōzuki PA	-	125.7	○		Sayō	Hyōgo
-	Sugisaka Tunnel	-				Sayō	Hyōgo
-	Sugisaka Tunnel	-				Mimasaka	Okayama
11-1	Sakutō IC	Okayama Prefectural Route 86	131.3			Mimasaka	Okayama
-	Sakutō BS	-	133.9	○		Mimasaka	Okayama
-	Narahara PA	-	136.4			Mimasaka	Okayama
12	Mimasaka IC	Okayama Prefectural Road 51	139.4	○		Mimasaka	Okayama
12-1	Shōō JCT	Mimasaka Okayama Road	141.8			Mimasaka	Okayama
-	Katsumada BS	-	144.0	○		Shōō	Okayama
-	Shōō SA	-	145.3			Shōō	Okayama
13	Tsuyama IC	National Route 53	150.7	○		Tsuyama	Okayama
-	Tsuyama-Kita BS	-	156.0	○		Tsuyama	Okayama
-	Ninomiya PA	-	159.1			Tsuyama	Okayama
14	Innoshō IC	National Route 179; Okayama Prefectural Route 261	161.1	○		Tsuyama	Okayama
-	Kume BS	-	166.5	○		Tsuyama	Okayama
-	Mimasaka-Oiwake PA	-	173.9	○		Maniwa	Okayama
15	Ochiai JCT	Yonago Expressway	175.0			Maniwa	Okayama
16	Ochiai IC	National Route 313	181.6	○		Maniwa	Okayama
-	Maniwa PA	-	184.6			Maniwa	Okayama
17	Hokubō JCT	Okayama Expressway	190.8			Maniwa	Okayama
18	Hokubō IC	National Route 313	193.4			Maniwa	Okayama
-	Azae BS	-	196.5	○		Maniwa	Okayama
-	Fuse BS	-	205.5	○		Niimi	Okayama
18-1	Ōsa SA/SIC	Okayama Prefectural Route 32	209.5	○	SIC: Open 06:00-24:00	Niimi	Okayama
-	Kumatani BS	-	215.6	○		Niimi	Okayama
19	Niimi IC	National Route 180	221.6	△		Niimi	Okayama
-	Shingō PA	-	228.8	◆		Niimi	Okayama
-	Tessei BS	-	237.9	○		Niimi	Okayama
20	Tojō IC	National Route 182	246.4	△		Shōbara	Hiroshima
-	Taishakukyō PA	-	248.6; 249.5		For Hiroshima, Kitakyūshū for Yonago, Osaka	Shōbara	Hiroshima
-	Taishaku BS	-	259.7	○		Shōbara	Hiroshima
-	Motomura PA	-	265.9; 267.0		For Hiroshima, Kitakyūshū for Yonago, Osaka	Shōbara	Hiroshima
21	Shōbara IC	National Route 432	276.6	○		Shōbara	Hiroshima
-	Nanatsukahara SA	-	283.1; 283.2		For Hiroshima, Kitakyūshū for Yonago, Osaka	Shōbara	Hiroshima
-	Wachi BS	-	286.5	○		Miyoshi	Hiroshima
21-1	Miyoshi-Higashi JCT/IC	Matsue Expressway; Onomichi Expressway; Hiroshima Prefectural Route 434	288.6			Miyoshi	Hiroshima
22	Miyoshi IC	National Route 375; Hiroshima Prefectural Route 470	293.6	○		Miyoshi	Hiroshima
-	Gōnokawa PA	-	299.1; 302.0		For Yonago, Osaka for Hiroshima, Kitakyūshū	Miyoshi	Hiroshima
-	Takamiya BS	-	308.3	○		Akitakata	Hiroshima
23	Takada IC	Hiroshima Prefectural Route 64	313.8			Akitakata	Hiroshima
-	Midori BS	-	315.8	○		Akitakata	Hiroshima
-	Hongō PA	-	317.9; 322.2		For Yonago, Osaka for Hiroshima, Kitakyūshū	Akitakata	Hiroshima
24	Chiyoda IC	Hiroshima Prefectural Route 5	328.9	○		Kitahiroshima	Hiroshima
25	Chiyoda JCT	Hamada Expressway	330.9			Kitahiroshima	Hiroshima
-	Asa SA	-	339.9; 340.4		For Yamaguchi, Hiroshima for Hamada, Osaka	Asakita-ku, Hiroshima	Hiroshima
26	Hiroshima-Kita JCT	Hiroshima Expressway	343.0			Asakita-ku, Hiroshima	Hiroshima
-	Ushizuyama Tunnel	-	345.8		Ōsaka-bound 3,573 m Kitakyūshū-bound 3,558 m	Asakita-ku, Hiroshima	Hiroshima
26-1	Kake BS/SIC	National Route 191	355.9	○	westbound exit, eastbound entrance	Akiōta	Hiroshima
27	Togōchi IC	National Route 186; National Route 191	360.4			Akiōta	Hiroshima
-	Tsutsuga PA	-	363.2	○		Akiōta	Hiroshima
-	Sakai Tunnel	-				Akiōta	Hiroshima
-	Sakai Tunnel	-				Hatsukaichi	Hiroshima
28	Yoshiwa IC	National Route 186	376.6			Hatsukaichi	Hiroshima
-	Yoshiwa SA	-	379.1	○		Hatsukaichi	Hiroshima
-	Kanmuriyama Tunnel	-			Ōsaka-bound 2,140 m Kitakyūshū-bound 2,198 m	Hatsukaichi	Hiroshima
-	Kanmuriyama Tunnel	-			Ōsaka-bound 2,140 m Kitakyūshū-bound 2,198 m	Iwakuni	Yamaguchi
-	Usa BS/CB	-	387.4	◆		Iwakuni	Yamaguchi
-	Fukaya PA	-	395.5	○		Iwakuni	Yamaguchi
29	Muikaichi IC	National Route 187	403.6	◆		Yoshika	Shimane
-	Asakura PA	-	408.5	◆		Yoshika	Shimane
-	Yoneyama Tunnel	-			Ōsaka-bound 3,154 m Kitakyūshū-bound 3,260 m	Yoshika	Shimane
-	Yoneyama Tunnel	-			Ōsaka-bound 3,154 m Kitakyūshū-bound 3,260 m	Shūnan	Yamaguchi
30	Kano IC	National Route 315	430.6	◆		Shūnan	Yamaguchi
-	Kano SA	-	432.2; 432.8		For Kitakyūshū for Hiroshima	Shūnan	Yamaguchi
-	Kushi BS/CB	-	439.7	◆		Yamaguchi	Yamaguchi
31	Tokuji IC	National Route 489	447.4	◆		Yamaguchi	Yamaguchi
-	Nioroshitōge PA	-	455.7			Yamaguchi	Yamaguchi
-	Niho BS	-	460.6	◆		Yamaguchi	Yamaguchi
32	Yamaguchi IC	National Route 262	467.4	◆		Yamaguchi	Yamaguchi
-	Yudaonsen PA/SIC	-	473.3	◆	SIC opening in 2020	Yamaguchi	Yamaguchi
(33)	Yamaguchi JCT	San'yō Expressway	475.4			Yamaguchi	Yamaguchi
34 34-1	Ogori IC; Ogori JCT	National Route 9 Yamaguchi Ube Road	480.1	◆		Yamaguchi	Yamaguchi
-	Mitō PA	-	487.5; 487.7		For Kitakyūshū for Hiroshima	Mine	Yamaguchi
-	Mana BS	-	489.5	◆		Mine	Yamaguchi
34-2	Mine-Higashi JCT	Ogori Hagi Road	490.5			Mine	Yamaguchi
35	Mine IC	National Route 435	498.2	○		Mine	Yamaguchi
-	Isa PA	-	505.5			Mine	Yamaguchi
35-1	Mine-Nishi IC	Yamaguchi Prefectural Route 33	511.7	◆		Mine	Yamaguchi
35-2	Shimonoseki JCT; Nagato-Yoshida BS	Sanyō Expressway Ube-Shimonoseki Route	519.0	◆		Shimonoseki	Yamaguchi
-	Ozuki BS	-	524.0	○		Shimonoseki	Yamaguchi
-	Shimonoseki JCT	Sanin Expressway (planned)	-			Shimonoseki	Yamaguchi
36	Ozuki IC	National Route 491	524.6	○		Shimonoseki	Yamaguchi
-	Ōji PA	-	529.1			Shimonoseki	Yamaguchi
-	Nagato-Katsuyama BS	-	535.9	◆		Shimonoseki	Yamaguchi
37	Shimonoseki IC	Yamaguchi Prefectural Route 57	540.1			Shimonoseki	Yamaguchi
Through to Kanmon Bridge

== Accidents ==
On 5 October 2013, comedian and singer Yakkun Sakurazuka died in an accident on the Chugoku Expressway in Mine, Yamaguchi, while en route to a concert in Kumamoto Prefecture. He was hit by another car and killed after exiting his car following a crash.
