= Higashihiroshima-Kure Expressway =

Expressway in Hiroshima Prefecture, Japan

Higashihiroshima-Kure Expressway
- 東広島呉自動車道

Route information
- Maintained by Ministry of Land, Infrastructure, Transport and Tourism
- Length: 32.8 km (20.4 mi)
- Existed: 2006–present
- Component highways: National Route 375

Major junctions
- North end: Takaya Junction; AH1 San'yō Expressway in Higashihiroshima
- South end: Aga Interchange; National Route 185 in Kure

Location
- Country: Japan

Highway system
- National highways of Japan; Expressways of Japan

The Higashihiroshima-Kure Expressway (東広島呉自動車道, Higashihiroshima-Kure Jidōsha-dō) is an national expressway in the southern part of Hiroshima Prefecture. The route connects the city of Higashihiroshima and the San'yō Expressway to the city of Kure on the coast of the Seto Inland Sea. It is owned and operated primarily by the Ministry of Land, Infrastructure, Transport and Tourism (MLIT). The route is signed E75 under MLIT's "2016 Proposal for Realization of Expressway Numbering."

== Route description ==
The Higashihiroshima-Kure Expressway was built to relieve traffic along Japan National Route 375 between the cities of Higashihiroshima and Kure. Once the expressway was completed, travel time along the corridor was cut from 90 minutes to 40 minutes.

The speed limit is 80 km/h for the entire route.

== Junction list ==
The entire expressway is in Hiroshima Prefecture.

Location	km	mi	Exit	Name	Destinations	Notes
Through to Higashihiroshima-Takata Road
Higashihiroshima	0	0.0	25-1	Takaya	AH1 San'yō Expressway– Fukuyama, Okayama, Hiroshima, Kitakyushu	Ramps to the San'yō Expressway are tolled, through traffic is not tolled.
Higashihiroshima	4.4	2.7	2	Kamiminaga	National Route 2– Iwakuni, Hiroshima, Mihara	
Higashihiroshima	8.7	5.4	3	Shimominaga-Fukumoto	Hiroshima Prefecture Route 32	
Higashihiroshima	11.7	7.3	4	Umaki	National Route 375/Hiroshima Prefecture Route 67– Kure, Kurose, Hiroshima University, Higashihiroshima	
Higashihiroshima	16.2	10.1	4-1	Otada	Hiroshima Prefecture Route 338– National Route 375	Northbound entrance, southbound exit
Higashihiroshima	20.5	12.7	5	Kurose	Hiroshima Prefecture Route 34– Kumano, Higashihiroshima	
Kure	24.1	15.0	6	Gohara	Hiroshima Prefecture Route 66	
Kure	32.8	20.4	7	Aga	National Route 185– Mihara, Ondo, Hiroshima, Central Kure	
1.000 mi = 1.609 km; 1.000 km = 0.621 mi: Incomplete access; Tolled
