= Hiroshima Prefecture =

Prefecture of Japan

Coordinates: 34°26′N 132°45′E

Hiroshima Prefecture 広島県
- Prefecture

Japanese transcription(s)
  - Japanese: 広島県
  - Rōmaji: Hiroshima-ken
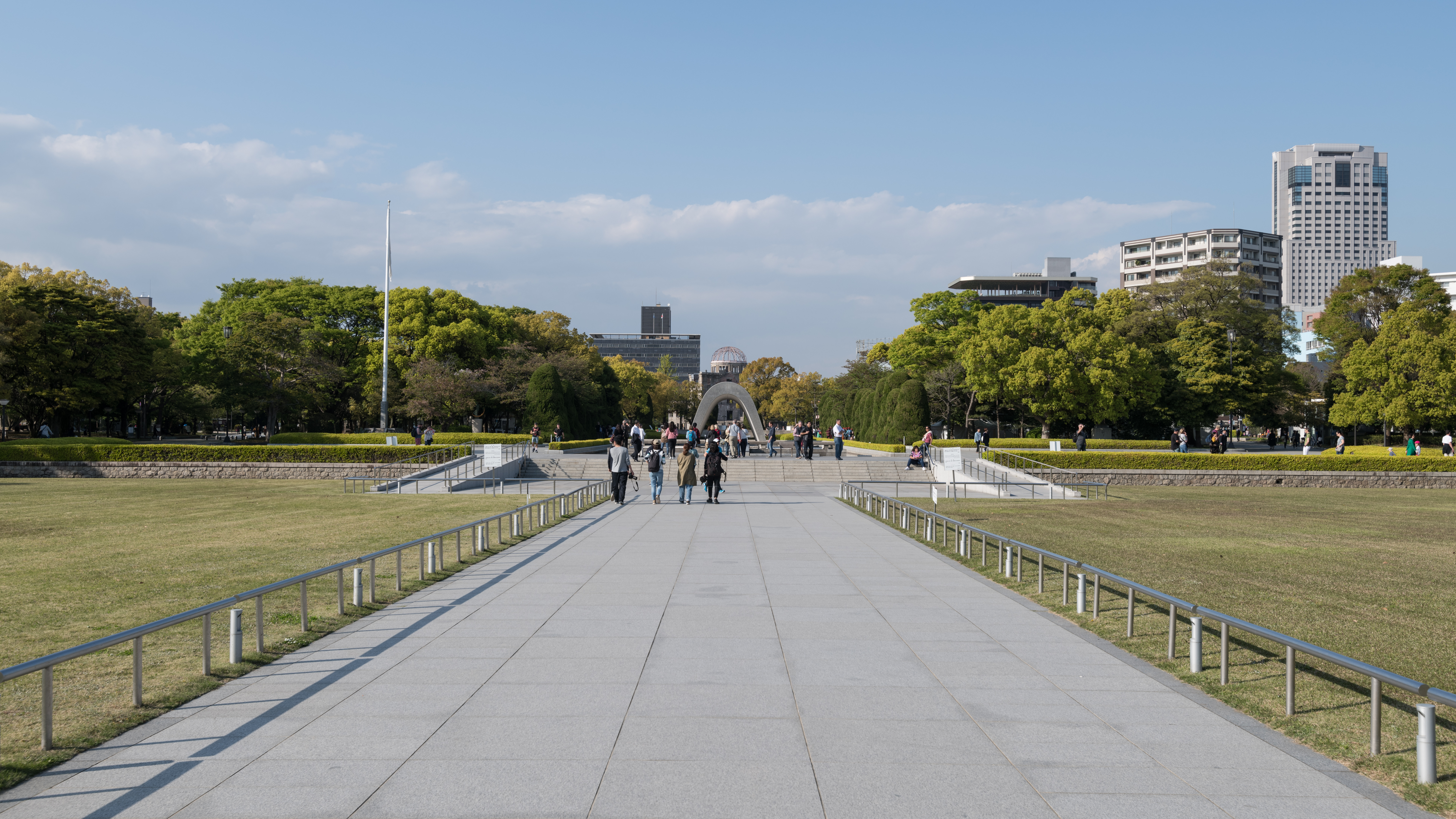
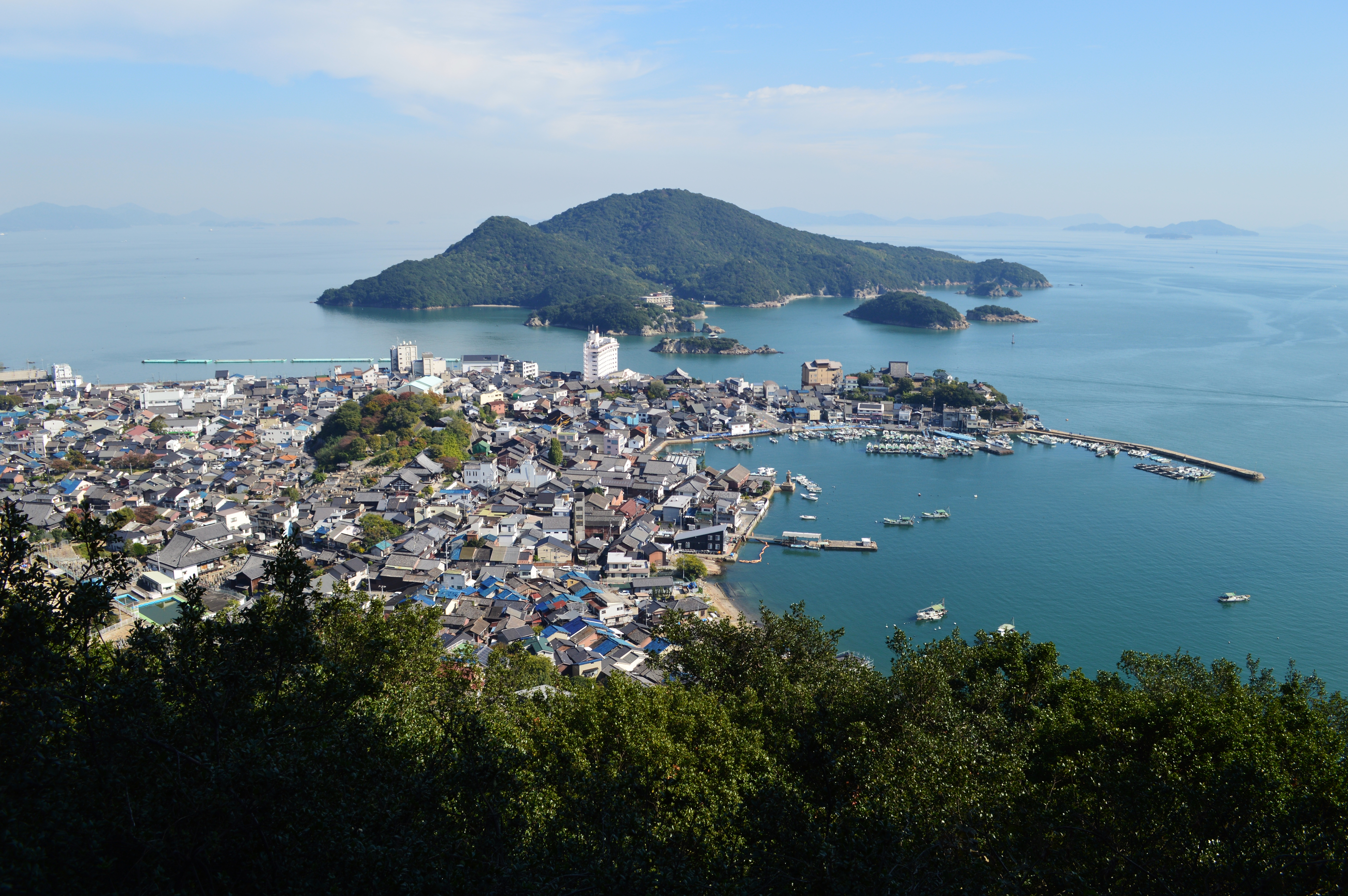
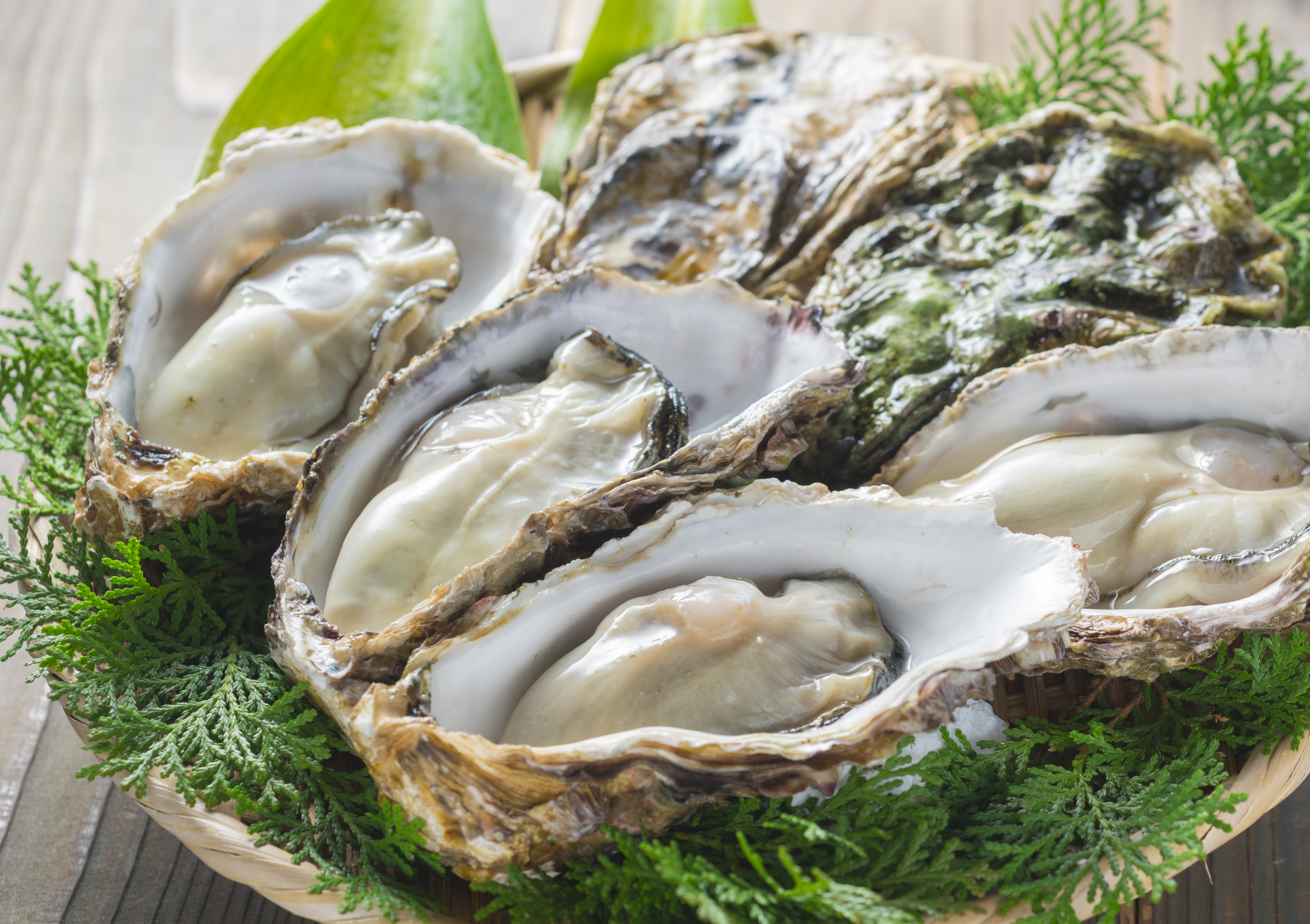
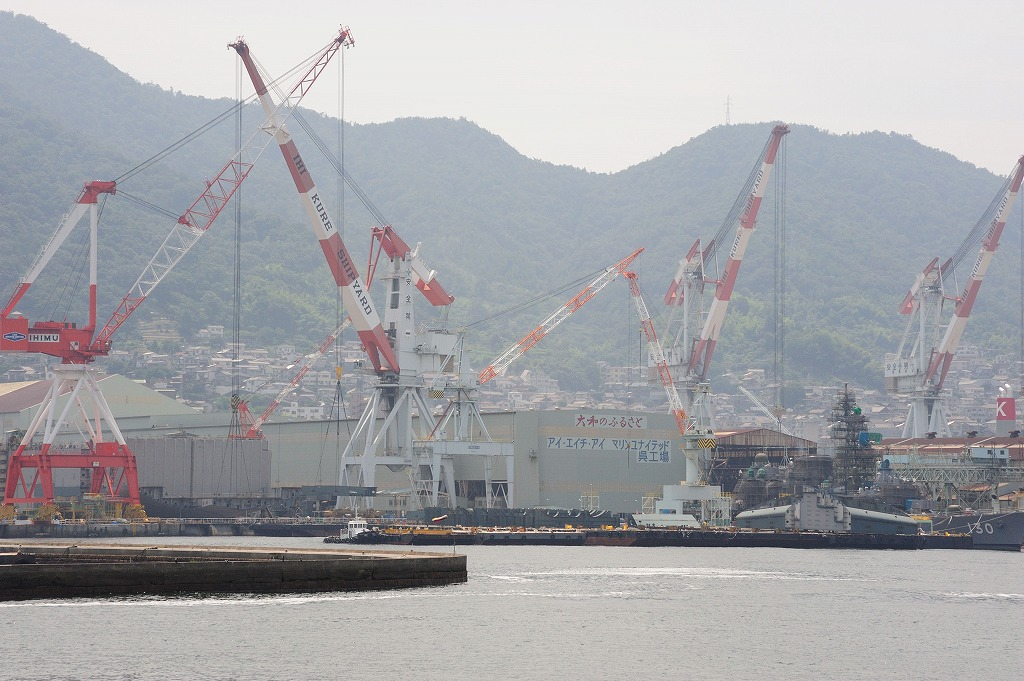
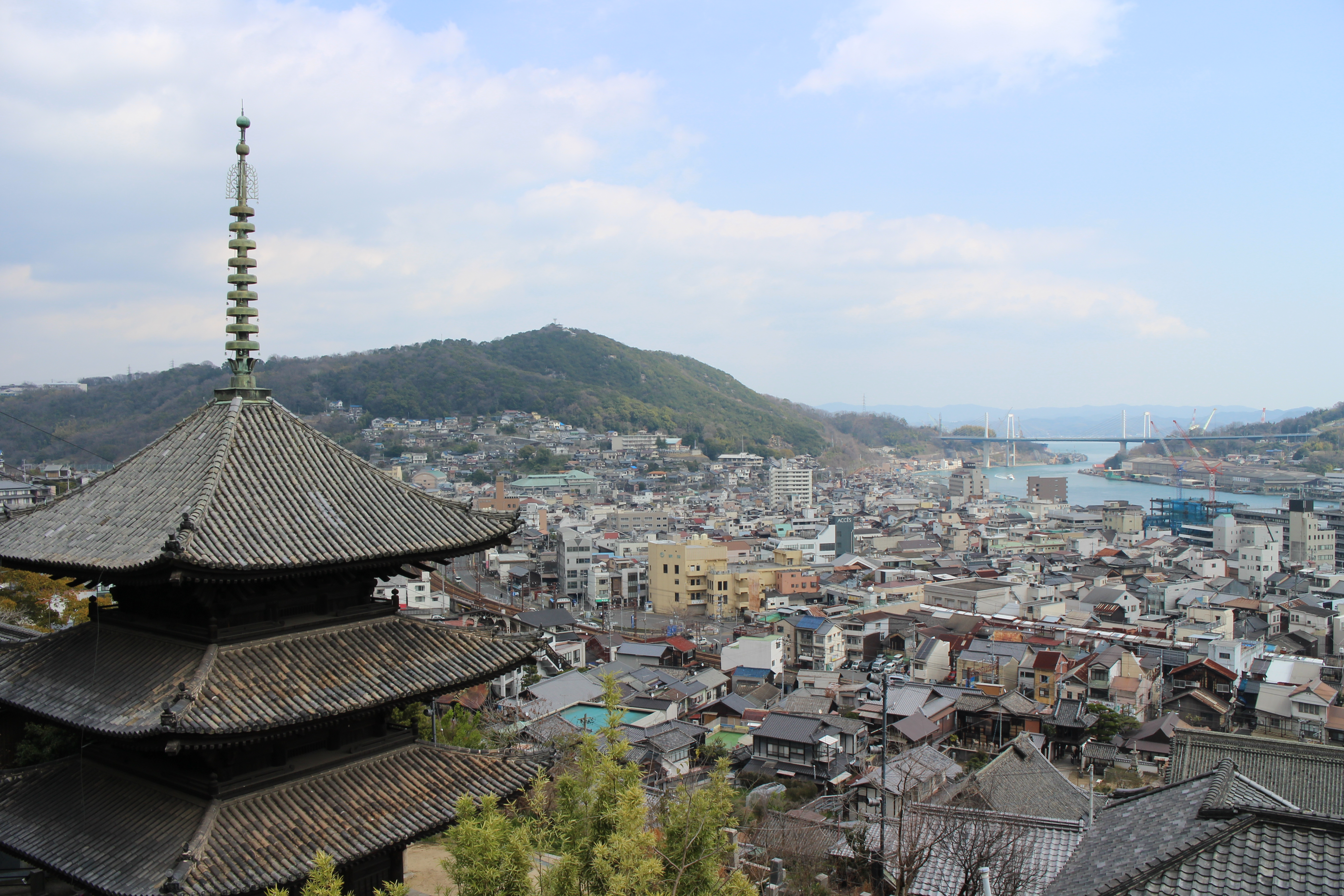
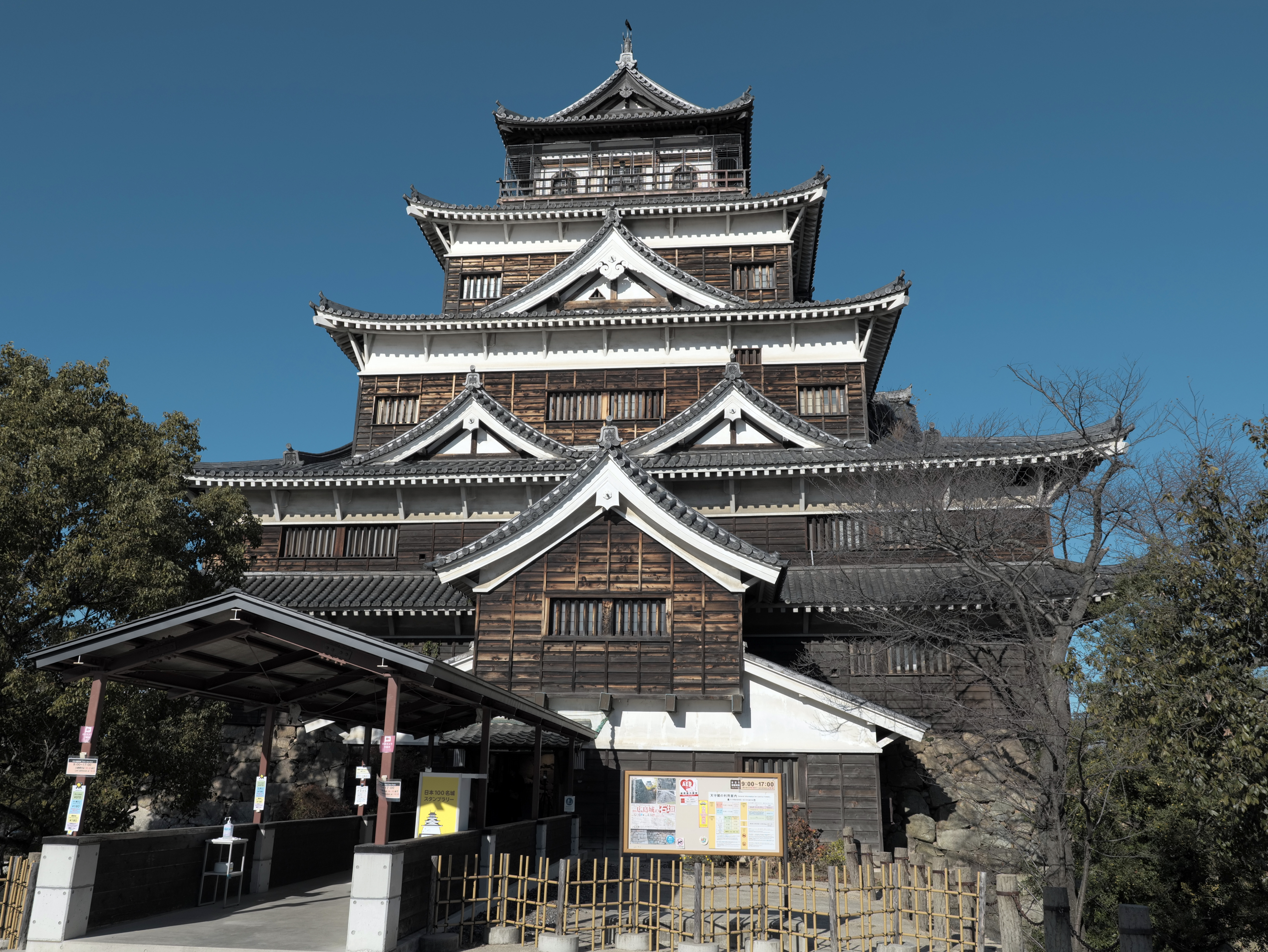
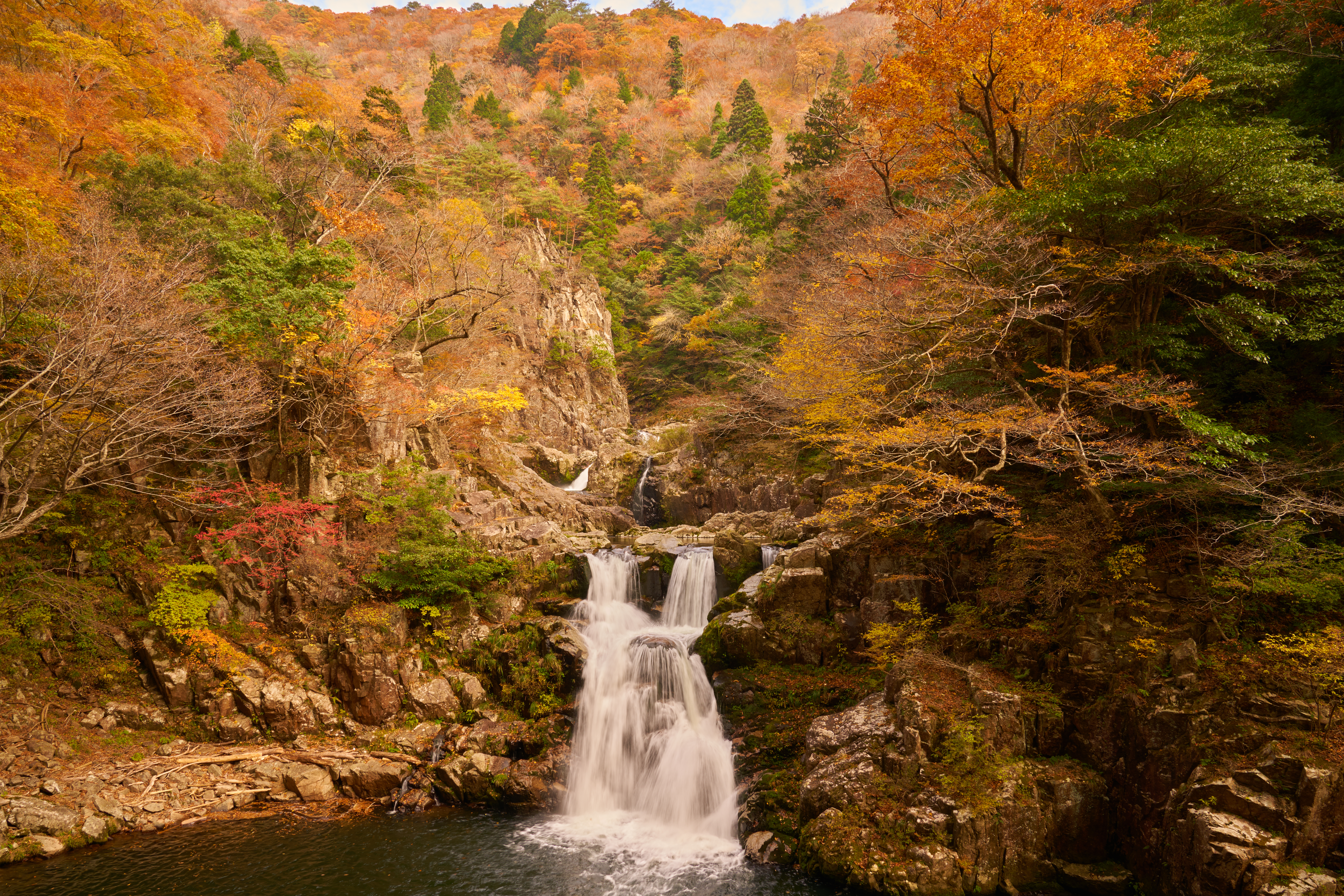
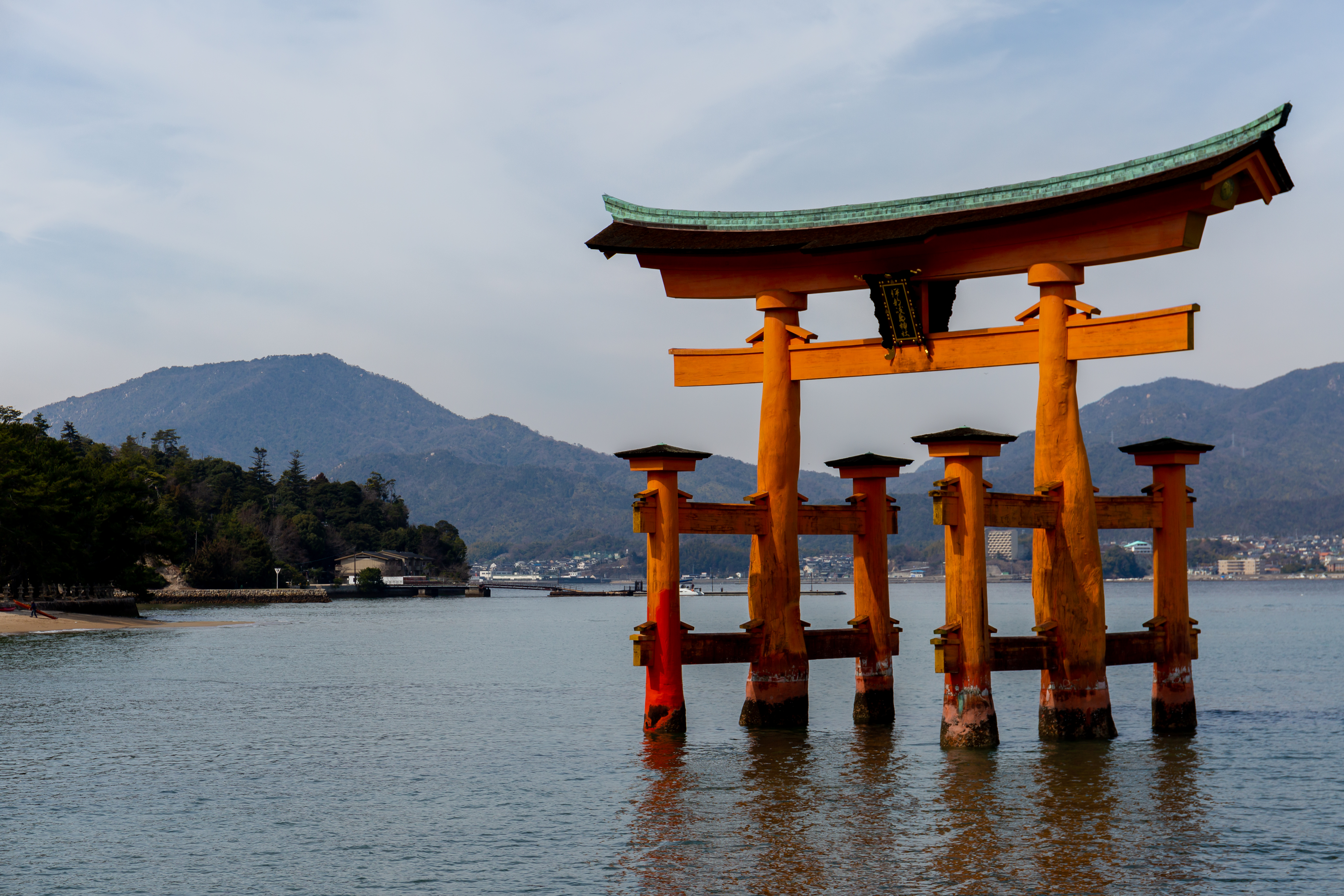
- Hiroshima Peace Memorial Park Tomonoura Hiroshima oyster Shipyard base in Kure Panoramic view of Senkoji and Onomichi Hiroshima Castle Sandan-kyō Torii Gate in Itsukushima Shrine

- Flag Emblem

- Country: Japan
- Region: Chūgoku (San'yō)
- Island: Honshu
- Capital: Hiroshima
- Subdivisions: Districts: 5, Municipalities: 23

Government
  - Governor: Mika Yokota (since November 2025)

Area
  - Total: 8,479.63 km^{2} (3,274.00 sq mi)
  - Rank: 11th

Population (June 1, 2019)
  - Total: 2,811,410
  - Rank: 12th
  - Density: 331.549/km^{2} (858.707/sq mi)
  - Dialects: Aki・Bingo

GDP
  - Total: JP¥12,476 billion US$92.1 billion (2022)
- ISO 3166 code: JP-34
- Website: pref.hiroshima.lg.jp
- Symbols of Japan
- Bird: Red-throated diver (Gavia stellata)
- Tree: Japanese maple (Acer palmatum)

Hiroshima Prefecture (広島県, Hiroshima-ken; Japanese pronunciation: [çì.ɾó̞.ɕí.mä́(.kè̞ɴ̀)]) is a prefecture of Japan located in the Chūgoku region of Honshu. Hiroshima Prefecture has a population of 2,811,410 (1 June 2019) and has a geographic area of 8,479 km^{2} (3,274 sq mi). Hiroshima Prefecture borders Okayama Prefecture to the east, Tottori Prefecture to the northeast, Shimane Prefecture to the north, and Yamaguchi Prefecture to the southwest. Hiroshima Prefecture also borders Ehime Prefecture for 74 metres (243 ft) on Hyōtanjima.

Hiroshima is the capital and largest city of Hiroshima Prefecture, and the largest city in the Chūgoku region, with other major cities including Fukuyama, Kure, and Higashihiroshima. Hiroshima Prefecture is located on the Seto Inland Sea across from the island of Shikoku, and is bounded to the north by the Chūgoku Mountains. Hiroshima Prefecture is one of the three prefectures of Japan with more than one UNESCO World Heritage Site. Known globally for the atomic bombing of 1945, Hiroshima has since rebuilt into a major regional center of industry, education, and culture. Its demographic profile is particularly significant from a population-studies perspective: the city has undergone dramatic population reconstruction after WWII, experienced the demographic transitions associated with Japan's rapid economic growth, and now faces the contemporary challenges of low fertility, population aging, and gradual population decline.

== History ==
The area around Hiroshima was formerly divided into Bingo Province and Aki Province. This location has been a center of trade and culture since the beginning of Japan's recorded history. Hiroshima is a traditional center of the Chūgoku region and was the seat of the Mōri clan until the Battle of Sekigahara.

Together with Nara and Tokyo, Hiroshima is one of the three prefectures with more than one UNESCO World Heritage Site. The two such sites in Hiroshima Prefecture are:

- The Atomic Dome in Hiroshima, one of the few remnants of prewar Hiroshima following the atomic bombing in 1945;
- The Itsukushima Shrine in Miyajima, famed for filling with water and appearing to "float" during high tide.

== Geography ==
Map of Hiroshima Prefecture Government Ordinance Designated City City Town

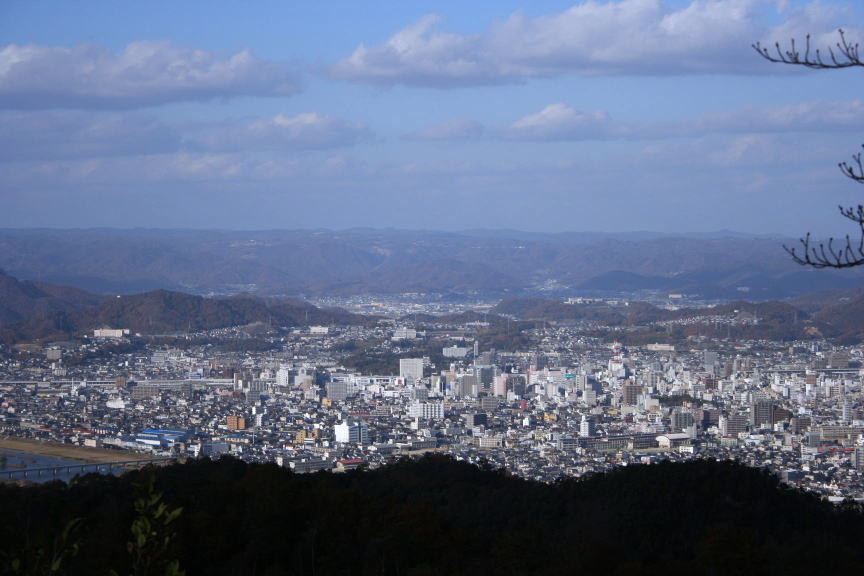
Fukuyama

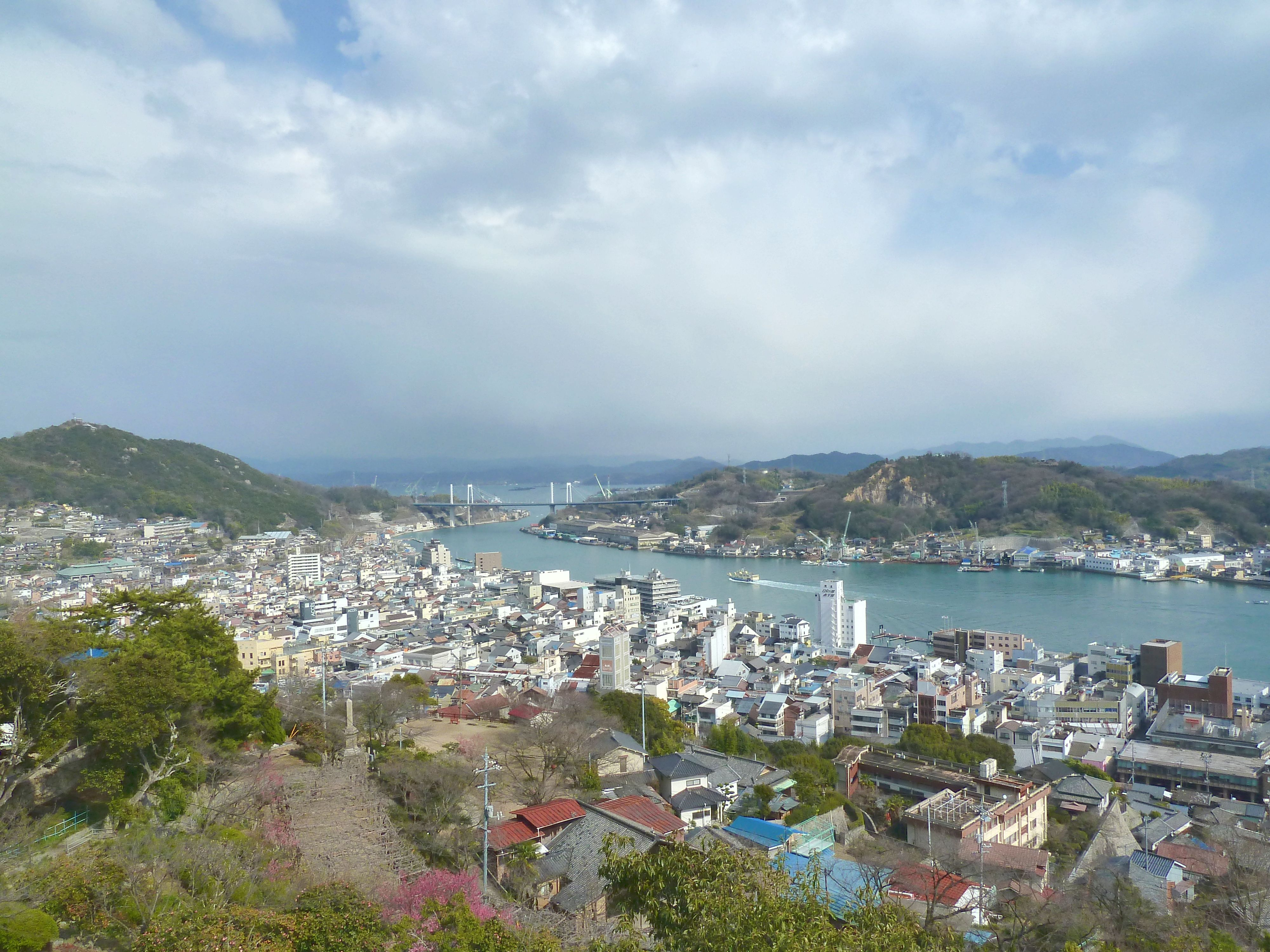
Onomichi

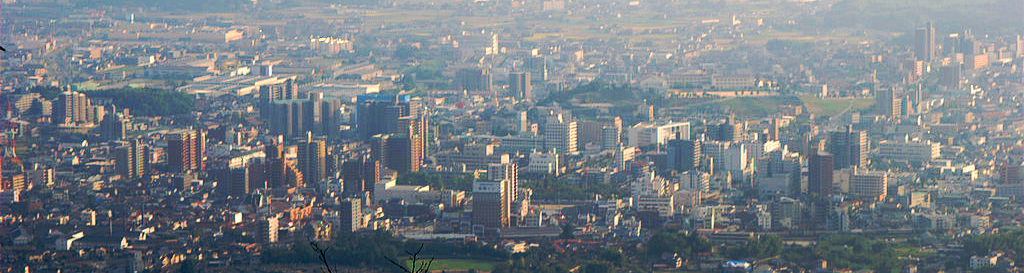
Higashihiroshima

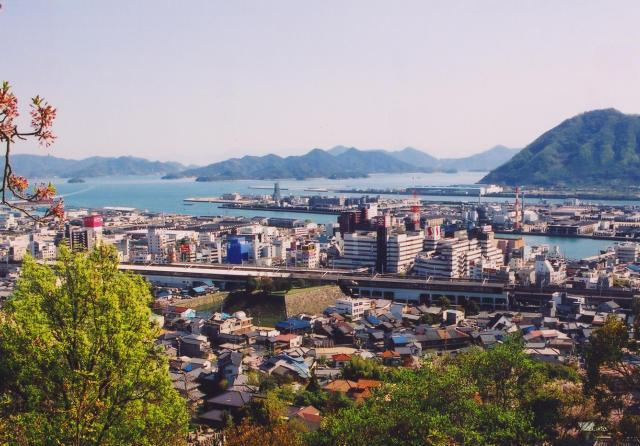
Mihara

Hiroshima prefecture lies in the middle of Japan. Most of the prefecture consists of mountains leading towards Shimane Prefecture; and rivers produce rich plains near the coast.

The province faces Shikoku across the Seto Inland Sea. Hiroshima Bay opens on the Inland Sea. The prefecture also includes many small islands.

The sheltered nature of the Inland Sea makes Hiroshima's climate very mild.

As of 1 April 2014, 4% of the total land area of the prefecture was designated as Natural Parks (the lowest percentage of any prefecture), namely Setonaikai National Park; Hiba-Dōgo-Taishaku and Nishi-Chūgoku Sanchi Quasi-National Parks; and six Prefectural Natural Parks.

=== Cities ===
Fourteen cities are located in Hiroshima Prefecture:

Name		Area (km^{2})	Population	Map
Rōmaji	Kanji	Area (km^{2})	Population	Map
Akitakata	安芸高田市	538.17	31,565	
Etajima	江田島市	100.97	24,596	
Fuchū	府中市	195.71	43,932	
Fukuyama	福山市	518.14	468,812	
Hatsukaichi	廿日市市	489.36	117,106	
Higashihiroshima	東広島市	635.32	185,418	
Hiroshima (capital)	広島市	906.68	1,199,391	
Kure	呉市	352.8	228,030	
Mihara	三原市	471.03	97,324	
Miyoshi	三次市	778.19	53,616	
Onomichi	尾道市	284.85	141,811	
Ōtake	大竹市	78.57	27,684	
Shōbara	庄原市	1,246.6	35,870	
Takehara	竹原市	118.3	26,035	

=== Towns ===
These are the towns in each district:

Name		Area (km^{2})	Population	District	Type	Map
Rōmaji	Kanji	Area (km^{2})	Population	District	Type	Map
Akiōta	安芸太田町	342.25	6,585	Yamagata District	Town	
Fuchū	府中町	10.45	52,056	Aki District	Town	
Jinsekikōgen	神石高原町	381.81	9,427	Jinseki District	Town	
Kaita	海田町	13.81	29,082	Aki District	Town	
Kitahiroshima	北広島町	645.86	19,115	Yamagata District	Town	
Kumano	熊野町	33.62	24,000	Aki District	Town	
Ōsakikamijima	大崎上島町	43.24	7,801	Toyota District	Town	
Saka	坂町	15.64	13,265	Aki District	Town	
Sera	世羅町	278.29	19,213	Sera District	Town	

== Economy ==
Historical population
Year	Pop.	±% p.a.
1890	1,319,507	—
1903	1,508,713	+1.04%
1913	1,691,699	+1.15%
1920	1,541,905	−1.32%
1925	1,617,680	+0.96%
1930	1,692,136	+0.90%
1935	1,804,916	+1.30%
1940	1,869,504	+0.71%
1945	1,885,471	+0.17%
1950	2,081,967	+2.00%
1955	2,149,044	+0.64%
1960	2,184,043	+0.32%
1965	2,281,146	+0.87%
1970	2,436,135	+1.32%
1975	2,646,324	+1.67%
1980	2,739,161	+0.69%
1985	2,819,200	+0.58%
1990	2,849,847	+0.22%
1995	2,881,748	+0.22%
2000	2,878,915	−0.02%
2005	2,876,642	−0.02%
2010	2,860,750	−0.11%
2015	2,844,963	−0.11%

Hiroshima's main industries include automobiles (Mazda is headquartered there) and tourism in two World Heritage Sites: the A-Bomb dome and Itsukushima Shrine.

Components of the economy are primary industry, secondary industry, and tertiary industry, which compose 0.6%, 32.6%, and 66.2% in 2015. There is 0.6% of unclassified production.

Value of production of manufacturing is 10,343 billion yen in 2016, which is the 10th largest in Japan. After 2012, production of manufacturing is continuously increasing in 2015.

== Education ==
=== University ===
- Eikei University of Hiroshima
- Elisabeth University of Music
- Fukuyama City University
- Fukuyama Heisei University
- Fukuyama University
- Hijiyama University
- Hiroshima Bunka Gakuen University
- Hiroshima Bunkyo Women's University
- Hiroshima City University
- Hiroshima Institute of Technology
- Hiroshima Jogakuin University
- Hiroshima Kokusai Gakuin University
- Hiroshima Shudo University
- Hiroshima University of Economics
- Hiroshima University
- Japan Coast Guard Academy
- Onomichi City University
- Prefectural University of Hiroshima
- Yasuda Women's University

== Religion ==
Religious denominations in the Hiroshima Prefecture (1996)
1. Pure Land Buddhism (35.3%)
2. Zen Buddhism (3.60%)
3. Tendai or Shingon Buddhism (4.40%)
4. Soka Gakkai (4.90%)
5. Nichiren Buddhism (3.00%)
6. Other Buddhist schools (1.00%)
7. Christianity (2.00%)
8. Shinto sects (2.00%)
9. Folk Shinto or no religion (44.8%)

Similar to the rest of Japan, most people in the Hiroshima Prefecture are Shinto and or Buddhist. In 1996, 51.2% of the population was Buddhist, 2% were affiliated with Shinto Sects, 44.8% practiced Folk Shinto, and 2% were Christian.

== Transportation ==
=== Railway ===
- JR West
  - Fukuen Line
  - Geibi Line
  - Kabe Line
  - Kure Line
  - San'yō Main Line
  - San'yō Shinkansen
- Ibara Railway

=== People movers ===
- Astram Line
- Skyrail Service

=== Streetcars ===
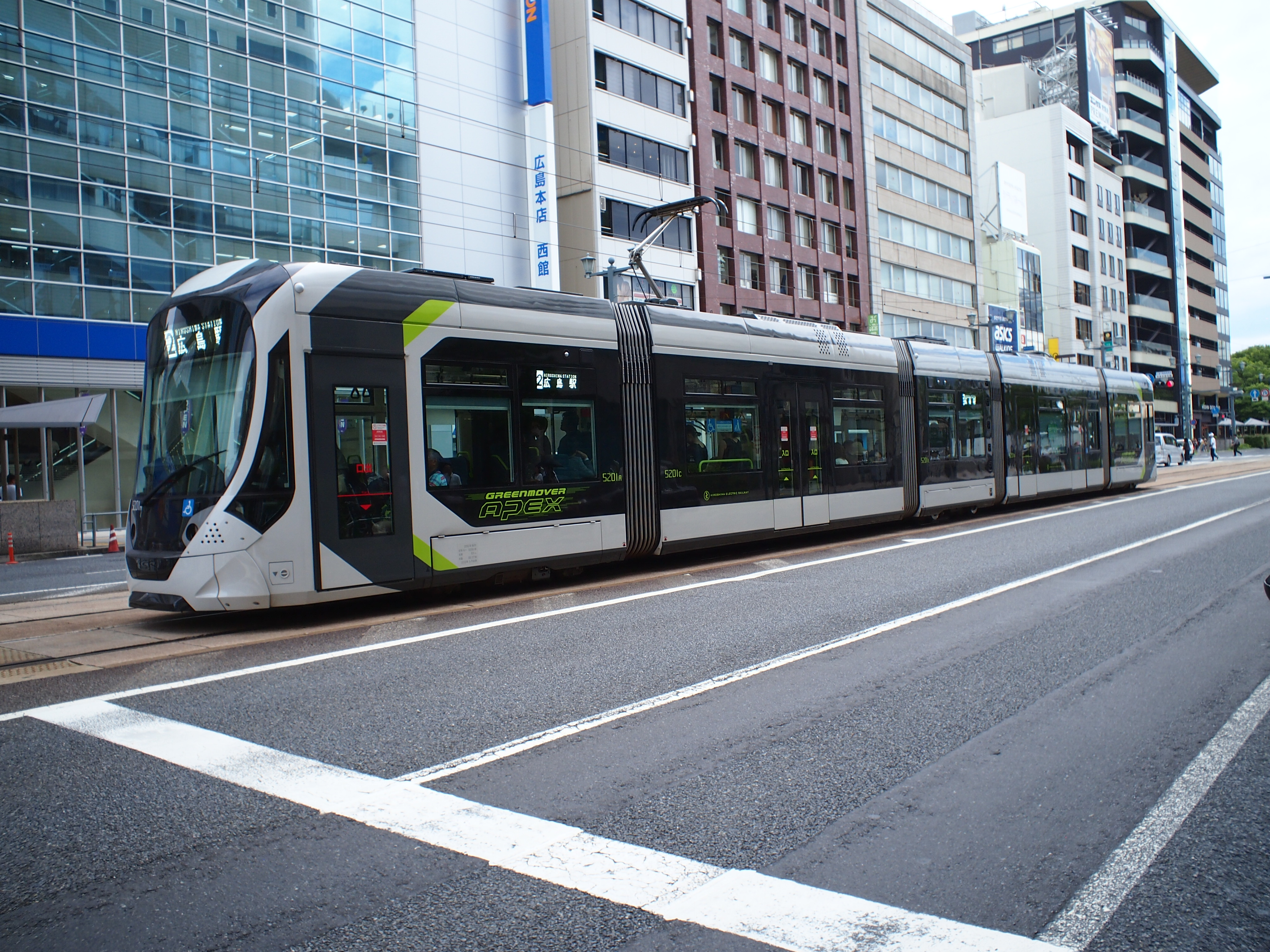
Hiroshima Tramway

- Hiroshima Electric Railway

=== Roads ===
==== Expressways ====
- Chūgoku Expressway
- Hamada Expressway
- Hiroshima Expressway (urban expressway)
- Hiroshima Expressway (West Nippon Expressway Company)
- Shimanami Expressway
- Onomichi Expressway
- San'yō Expressway

==== National highways ====
- Route 2
- Route 31
- Route 54
- Route 182
- Route 183
- Route 185
- Route 186
- Route 191
- Route 261
- Route 313
- Route 314
- Route 317
- Route 375
- Route 432
- Route 433
- Route 434
- Route 486
- Route 487
- Route 488

=== Ports ===
- Fukuyama Port - International Container hub port
- Hiroshima Port - Ferry route to Miyajima, Edajima, Matsuyama, and Beppu, and also International Container hub port
- Kure Port - Ferry route to Edajima, Matsuyama
- Mihara Port
- Onomichi Port

=== Airports ===
- Hiroshima Airport

== Sports ==
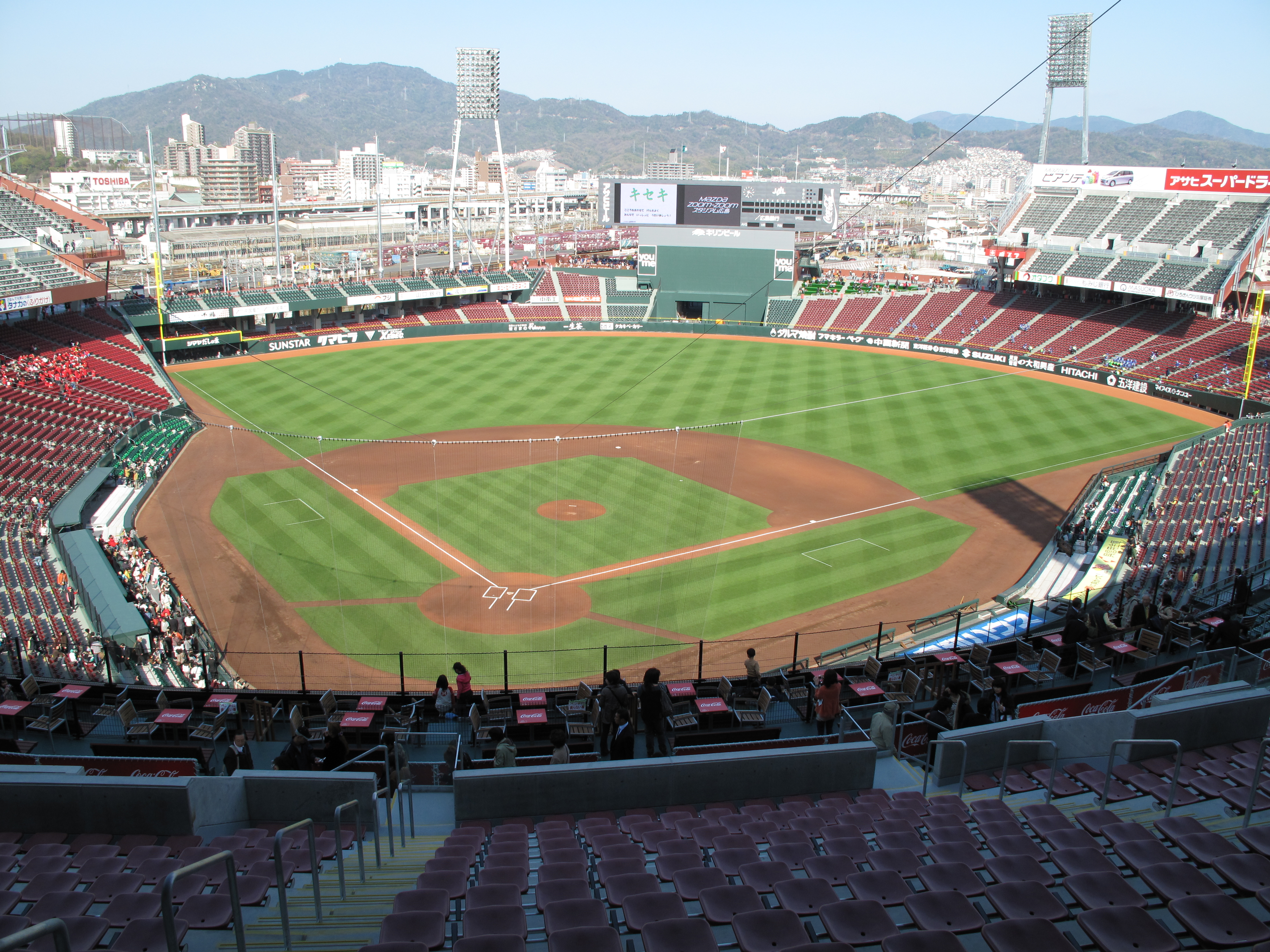
Mazda Stadium

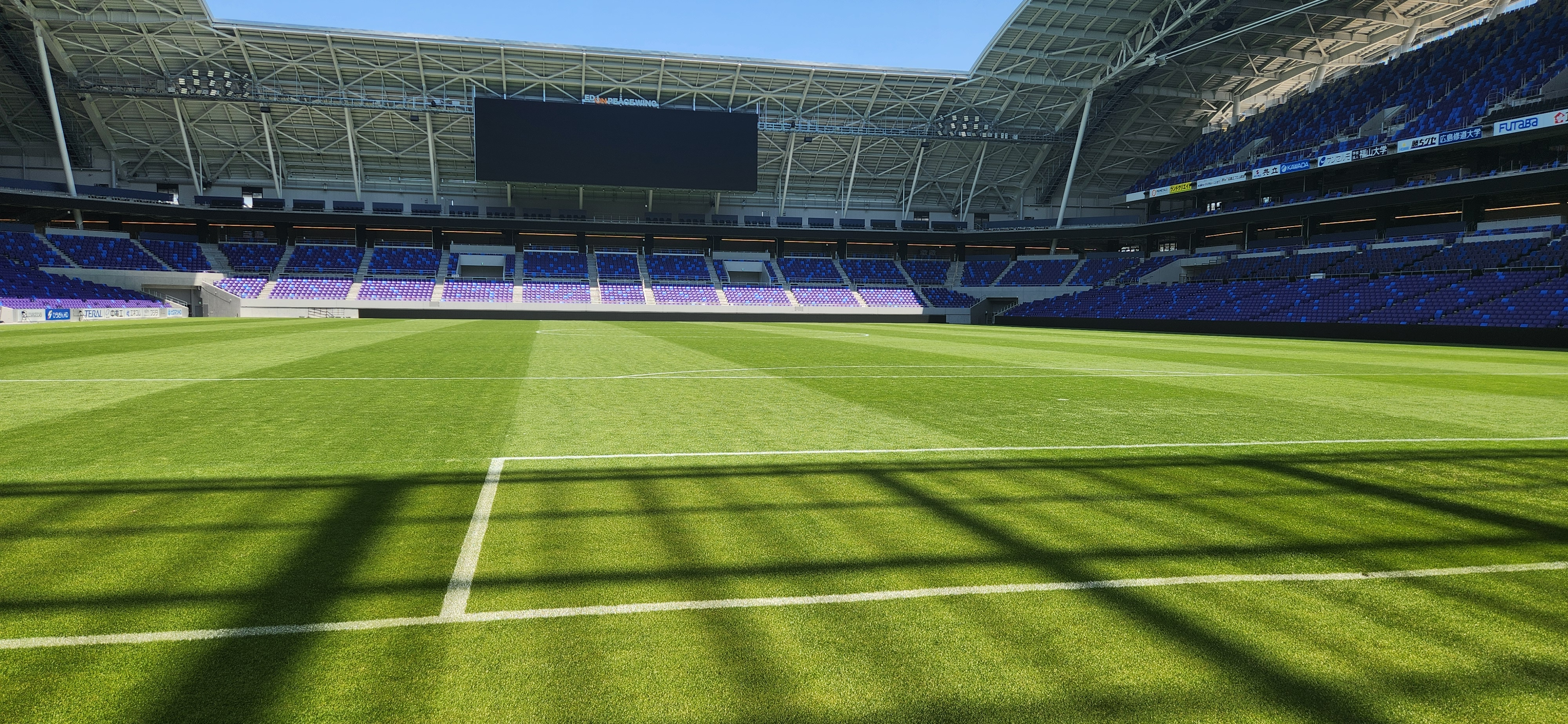
Edion Peace Wing Hiroshima, a home stadium of Sanfrecce Hiroshima and Sanfrecce Hiroshima Regina

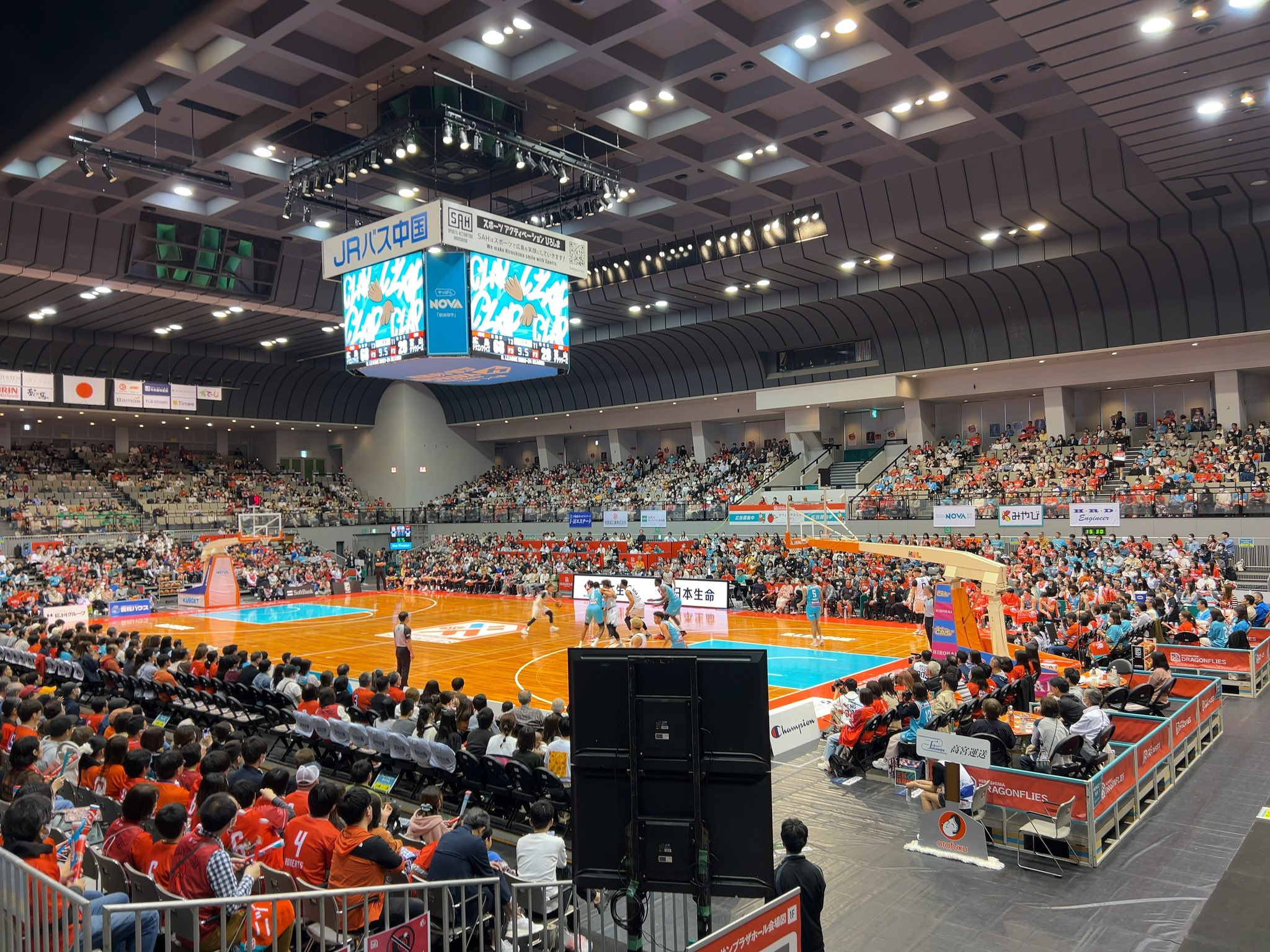
Hiroshima Sun Plaza, a home arena of Hiroshima Dragonflies

The sports teams listed below are based in Hiroshima.

American Football

- Hiroshima Hawks (Hiroshima City)

=== Football ===
- Sanfrecce Hiroshima (Hiroshima city)
- Sanfrecce Hiroshima Regina (Hiroshima city)

=== Baseball ===
- Hiroshima Toyo Carp (Hiroshima city)

=== Volleyball ===
- JT Thunders (Hiroshima city)

=== Basketball ===
- Hiroshima Dragonflies
- Hiroshima Lightning (Defunct)

=== Handball ===
- Akitakada Handball Club (Akitakada)
- Hiroshima Maple Reds (Hiroshima city)

=== Cycling ===
- Victoire Hiroshima

== Tourism ==
- Fukuyama Castle
- Hiroshima Peace Memorial
- Hiroshima Castle
- Itsukushima Shrine
- Jōdo-ji Temple
- Kure Portopia Park
- Mitaki Temple
- Miyajima Public Aquarium
- Momijidani Park
- Mount Misen
- Onomichi City Museum of Art
- Senkō-ji Temple
- Shukkei-en
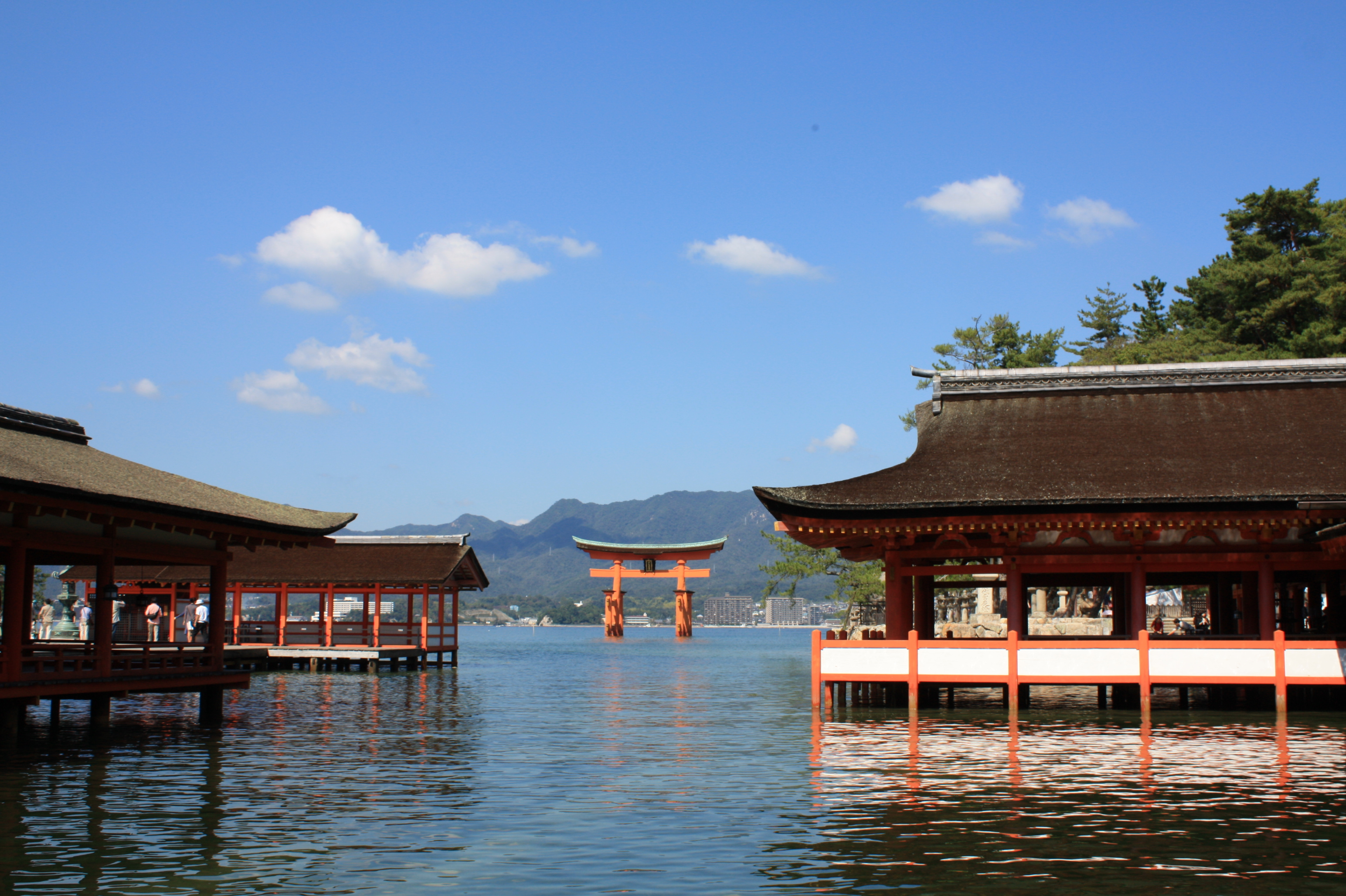
Itsukushima Shrine and Torii Gate (Hatsukaichi)

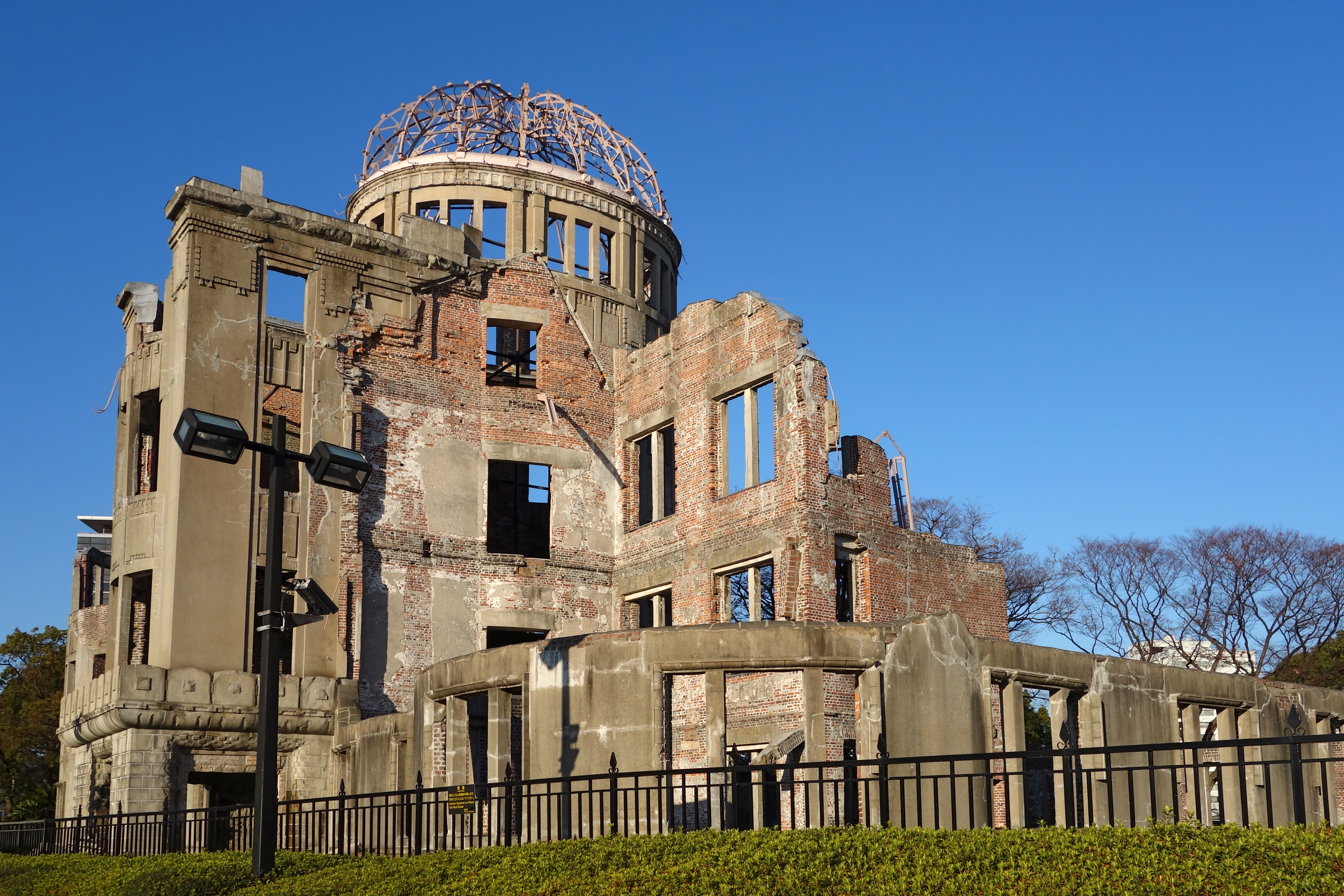
Hiroshima Peace Memorial (Hiroshima City)

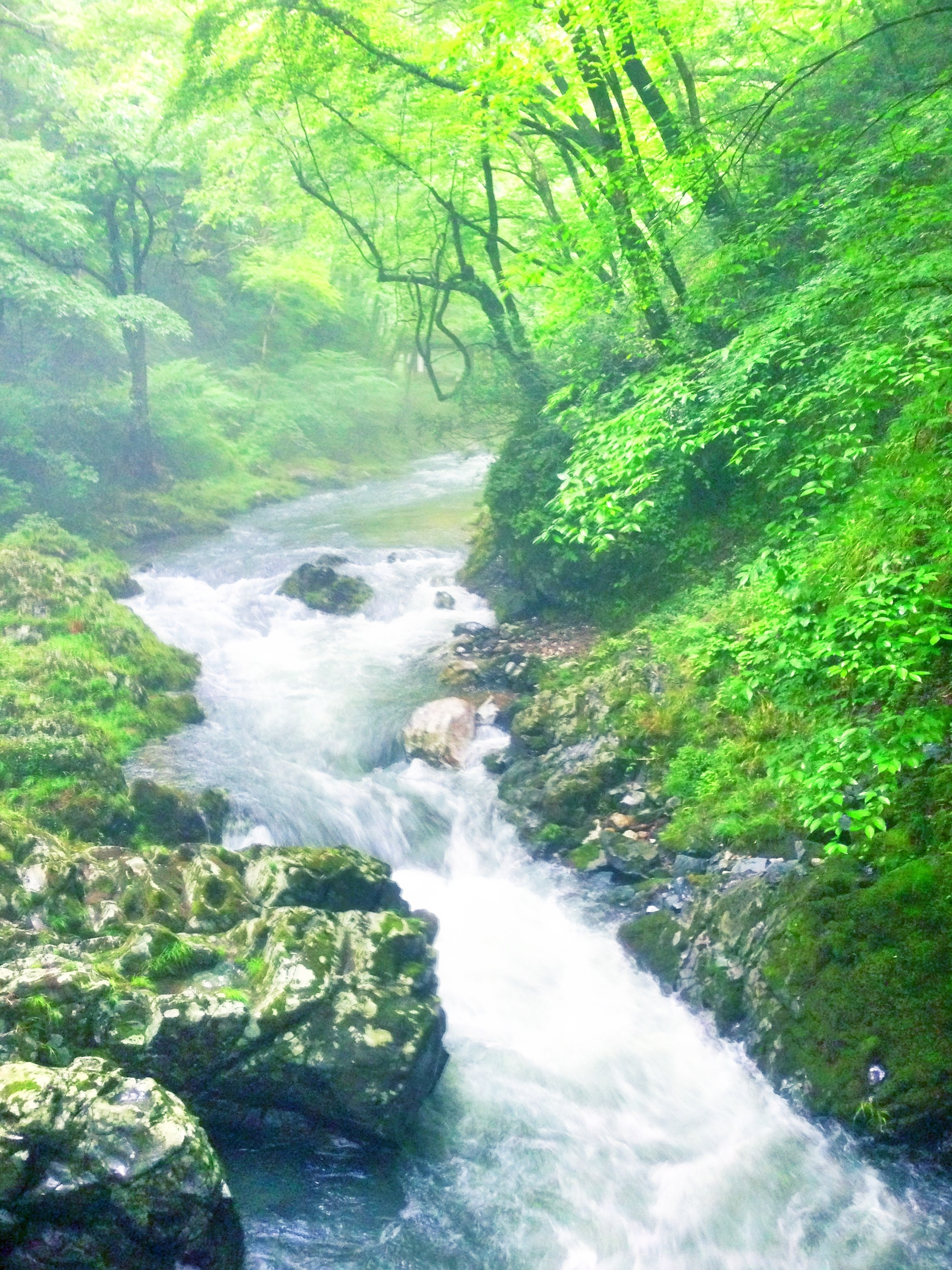
Taishaku Valley (Shobara)

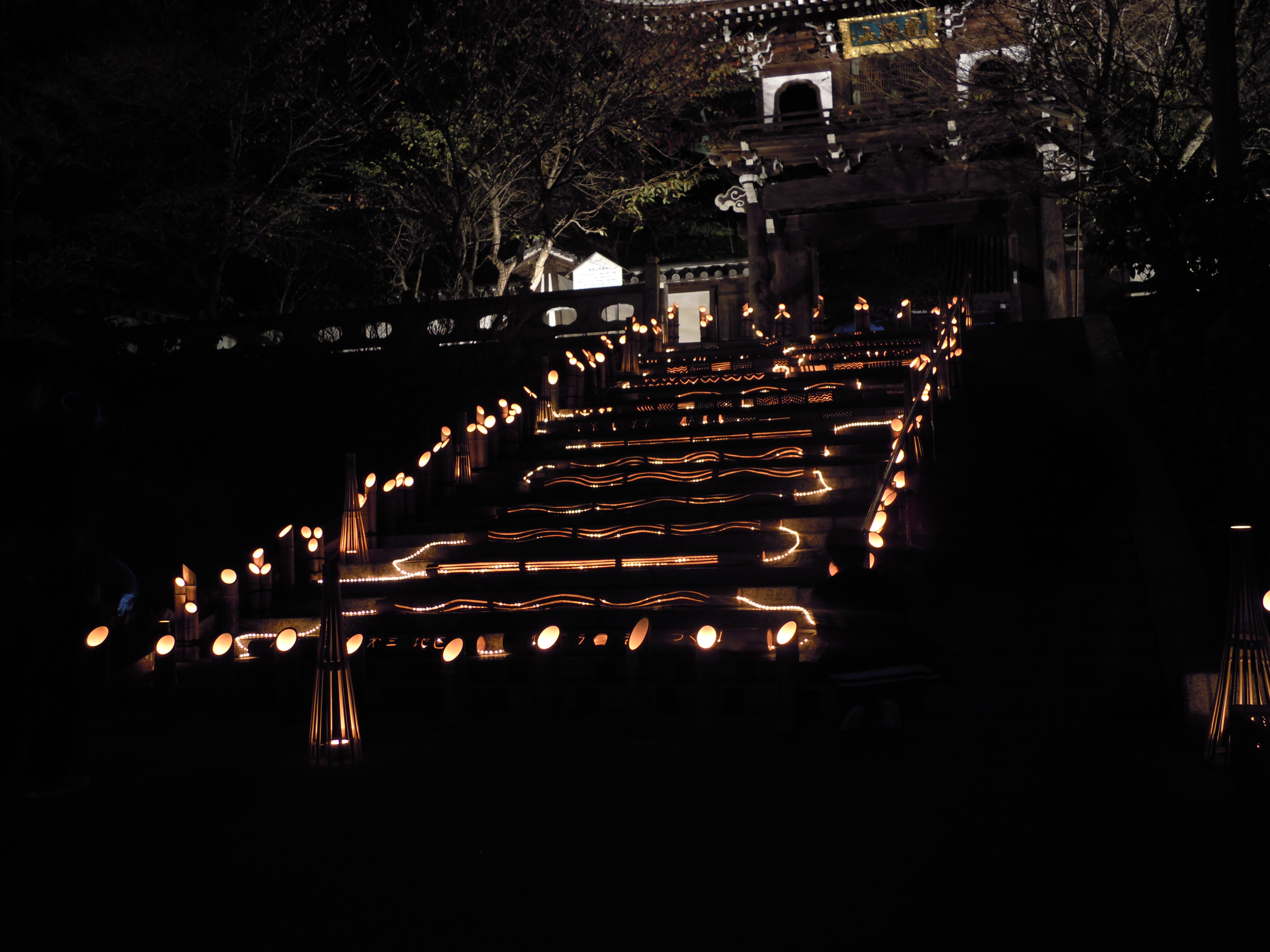
Road of longing (Shokei no michi) in Takehara on October

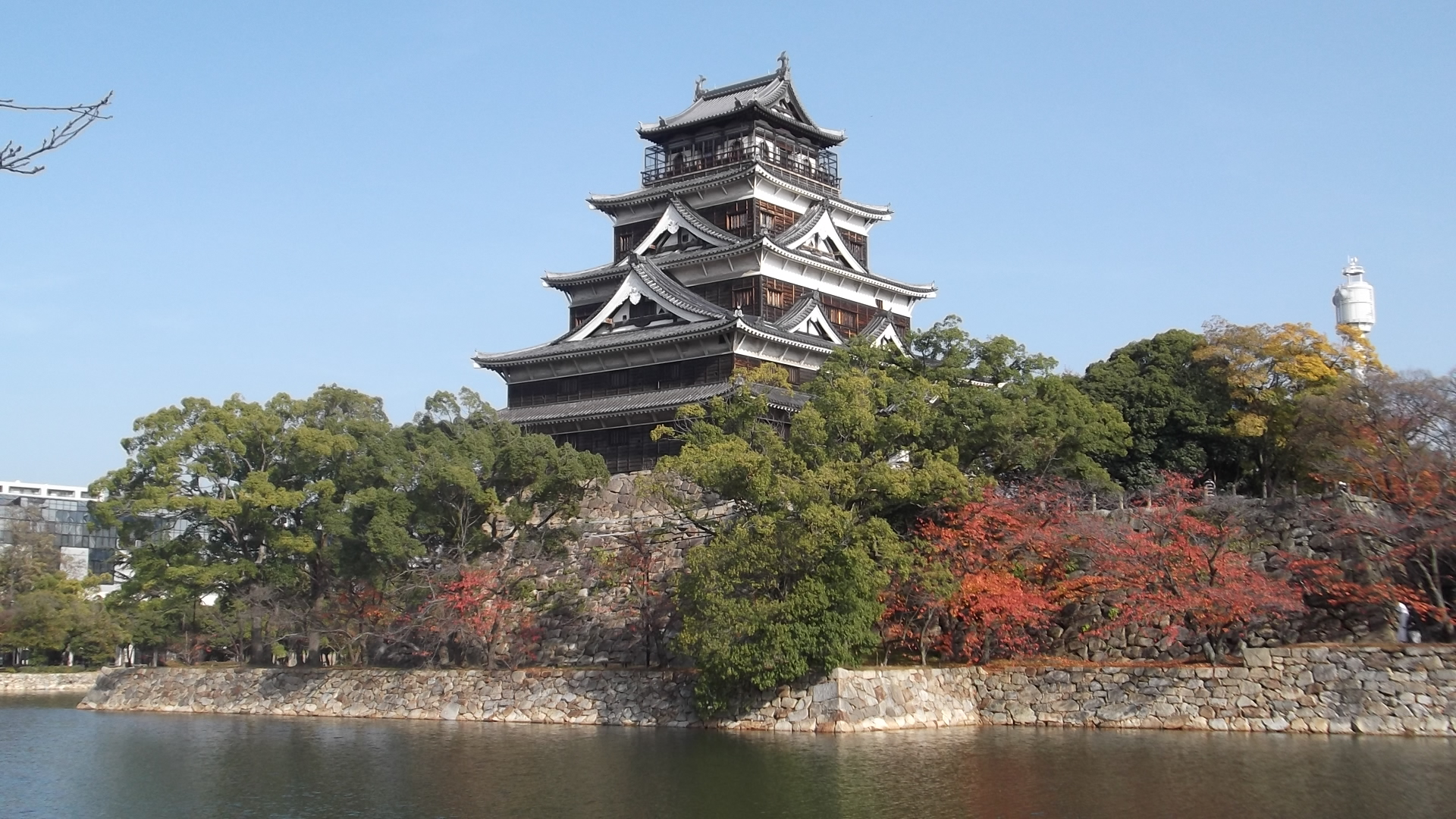
Hiroshima Castle

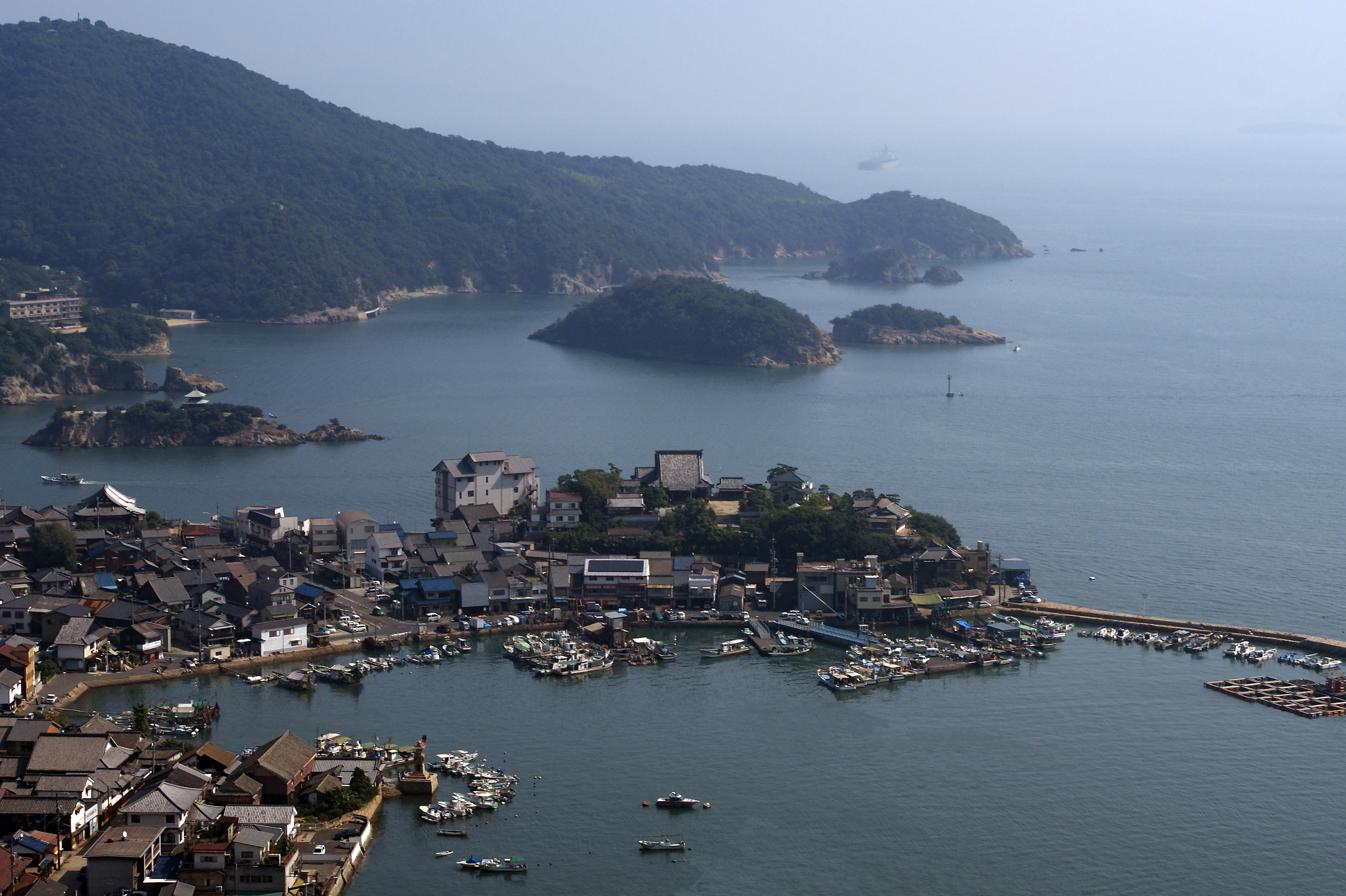
Tomonoura (Fukuyama)

== Famous festivals and events ==
- Onomichi Port Festival - held in April
- Hiroshima Flower Festival - held from May 3 to 5
- Fukuyama Rose Festival - held in May
- Enryuji Tokasan Festival - held in June
- Gion Festival of Onomichi - held in July
- Innoshima Water-naval Festival - held in August
- Miyajima Under-water Firework Festival - held on August 14
- Yassa Festival of Mihara - held in August
- Saijo Sake Festival - held in October
- Onomichi Becher Festival - held on November 3
- Hiroshima Ebisu Festival - held from November 18 to 20

== International sister relations ==
- Hawaii, United States of America
- Sichuan Province, China
