= Matsue Expressway =

Expressway in Hiroshima and Shimane prefecture, Japan

Matsue Expressway
- 松江自動車道

Route information
- Length: 71.6 km (44.5 mi)
- Existed: 2003–present

Major junctions
- From: Miyoshi-Higashi Junction/IC in Miyoshi, Hiroshima; Chūgoku Expressway
- To: Shinji Junction in Matsue, Shimane; San-in Expressway

Location
- Country: Japan
- Major cities: Shōbara, Unnan

Highway system
- National highways of Japan; Expressways of Japan

The Matsue Expressway (松江自動車道, Matsue Jidōsha-dō) is a national expressway in the Chūgoku region of Japan. It is owned and operated by West Nippon Expressway Company.

== Overview ==
The expressway is officially referred to as the Chūgoku-Ōdan Expressway Onomichi Matsue Route. The route connects the city of Matsue with the Chugoku Expressway in Hiroshima Prefecture.

The first section of the expressway was opened in 2003. The final section of the expressway (48.7 km between Miyoshi-Higashi Junction and Yoshida-Kakeya Interchange) was opened on March 30, 2013.

There was additional construction in the Oyoshida Area.

The section between Miyoshi-Higashi Junction and Mitoya-Kisuki Interchange is toll-free; all other sections assess tolls based on distance travelled in the same manner as most other national expressways.

== List of interchanges and features ==
- IC - interchange, SIC - smart interchange, JCT - junction, SA - service area, PA - parking area, BS - bus stop, TN - tunnel, BR - bridge

No.	Name	Connections	Dist. from Origin	Bus Stop	Notes	Location	
Through to Onomichi Expressway
(21-1) 1	Miyoshi-Higashi JCT; Miyoshi-Higashi IC	Chūgoku Expressway; Hiroshima Prefectural Route 434	0.0			Miyoshi	Hiroshima
2	Kuchiwa IC		13.3			Shōbara	Hiroshima
3	Takano IC		28.8	△		Shōbara	Hiroshima
4	Unnan-Yoshida IC		44.9	△		Unnan	Shimane
5	Yoshida-Kakeya IC	Shimane Prefectural Route 336	48.7			Unnan	Shimane
BS	Kisuki BS		60.5	○		Unnan	Shimane
6	Mitoya-Kisuki IC	Shimane Prefectural Route 332	61.0			Unnan	Shimane
TB	Mitoya-Kisuki TB		61.2			Unnan	Shimane
BS	Kamo BS		66.0	○		Unnan	Shimane
PA	Kamo-Iwakura PA		68.2			Unnan	Shimane
29	Shinji JCT	San-in Expressway	71.6			Matsue	Shimane
