= Flag of Hiroshima Prefecture =

Japanese prefectural flag

Hiroshima Prefecture

The flag of Hiroshima Prefecture (Japanese: 広島県旗, Hepburn: Hiroshima-ken ki) is a crimson field charged in the center with a white, stylized representation of the initial mora hi (ヒ) in katakana. On its own, the charge is the emblem of Hiroshima Prefecture (広島県章, Hiroshima-ken shō) and shares the same crimson color as the field of the flag. The overlapping circles of the emblem represent "the growing progress and development" of Hiroshima Prefecture.

The emblem was adopted on 23 July 1966, while the flag was established by Hiroshima Prefectural Notification No. 572, enacted on 16 July 1968. The flag's width-to-length ratio is 3:5 and its shade of red is crimson, Munsell values 4R 4/11 (Japan Industrial Standards).
