= Okayama Expressway =

Expressway in Okayama prefecture, Japan

Okayama Expressway
- 岡山自動車道

Route information
- Length: 43.9 km (27.3 mi)
- Existed: 1991–present

Major junctions
- From: Okayama Junction in Kita-ku, Okayama; Sanyō Expressway
- To: Hokubō Junction in Maniwa, Okayama; Chūgoku Expressway

Location
- Country: Japan
- Major cities: Takahashi

Highway system
- National highways of Japan; Expressways of Japan

The Okayama Expressway (岡山自動車道, Okayama Jidōsha-dō) is a national expressway in Okayama Prefecture, Japan. It is owned and operated by West Nippon Expressway Company.

== Naming ==
The expressway is officially referred to as the Chūgoku-Ōdan Expressway Okayama Yonago Route. The Chūgoku-Ōdan Expressway Okayama Yonago Route is the official designation for the Sanyō Expressway between Okayama Interchange and Okayama Junction, the Okayama Expressway between Okayama Junction and Hokubō Junction, the Chūgoku Expressway between Hokubō Junction and Ochiai Junction, and the Yonago Expressway between Ochiai Junction and Yonago Interchange (concurrent with the Chūgoku-Ōdan Expressway Okayama Yonago Route).

== Overview ==
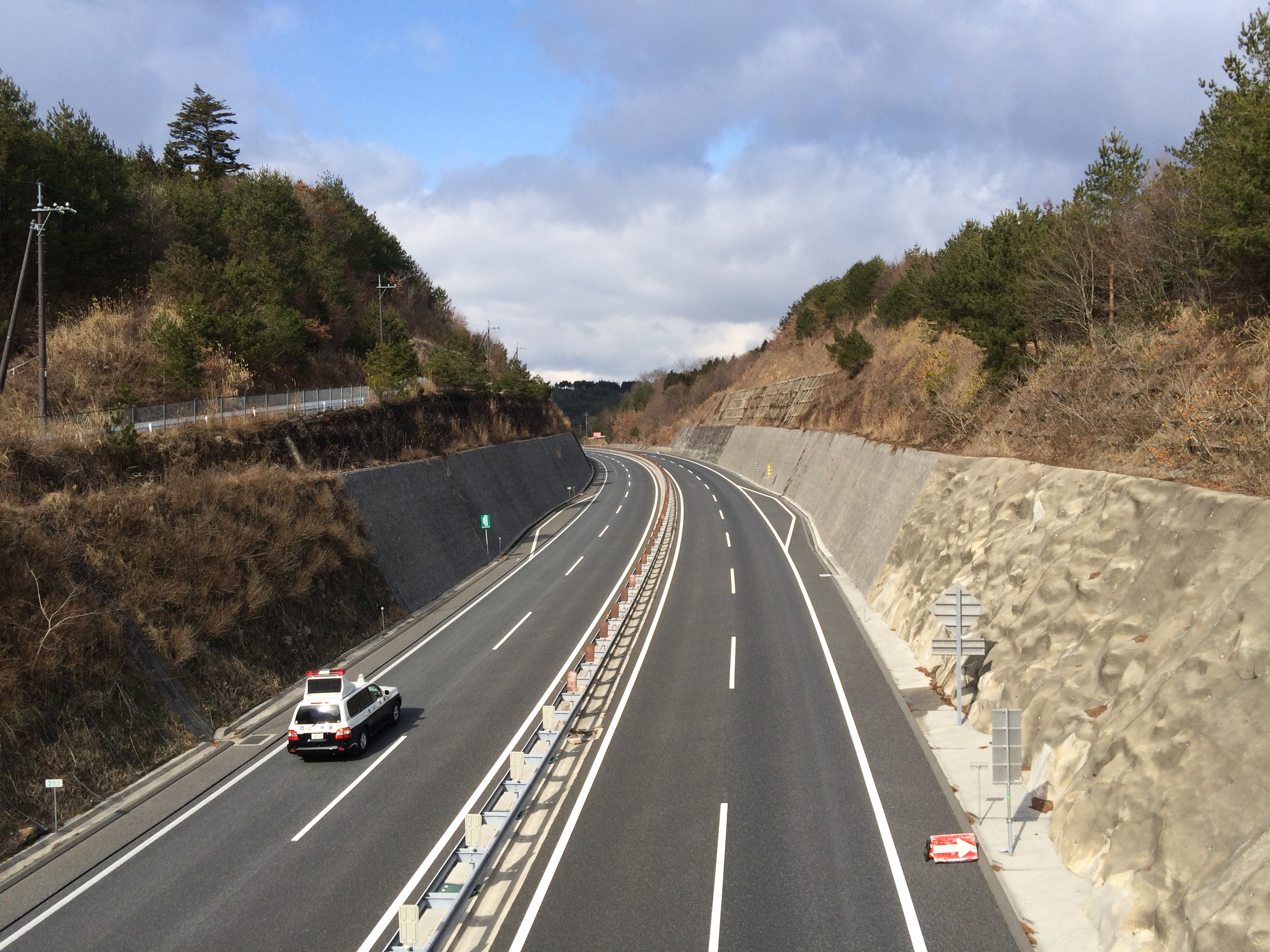
Okayama Expressway, Kibichūō Town, Kita

The first section of the expressway was opened in 1991. The final section of the expressway (41.2 km between Okayama-Sōja Interchange and Hokubō Junction) was opened on March 15, 1997. The route originates from its junction with the Sanyō Expressway and extends northward. At its northern terminus it connects to the Chūgoku Expressway.

The expressway is 4 lanes from Okayama Junction to Kayō Interchange and the remainder is 2 lanes. The speed limit is 80 km/h on 4-laned sections and 70 km/h on 2-laned sections.

== List of interchanges and features ==
- IC - interchange, SIC - smart interchange, JCT - junction, SA - service area, PA - parking area, BS - bus stop, TN - tunnel, BR - bridge

No.	Name	Connections	Dist. from Origin	Bus Stop	Notes	Location (all in Okayama)
(15)	Okayama JCT	Sanyō Expressway	0.0			Kita-ku, Okayama
1	Okayama-Sōja IC	National Route 180; National Route 429	2.7			Kita-ku, Okayama
PA	Sōja PA		7.0			Sōja
TN	Tōzaka Tunnel				northbound: 1,450 m (4,760 ft) southbound: 1,460 m (4,790 ft)	Sōja
BR	Minobe Bridge				Length - 703 m	Sōja
TN	Makidani Tunnel				northbound: 1,170 m (3,840 ft) southbound: 1,070 m (3,510 ft)	Sōja
2	Kayō IC	National Route 484	22.6	○		Kibichūō
SA	Takahashi SA		30.9; 31.4		For Hokubō for Okayama	Takahashi
3	Ukan IC	Okayama Prefectural Road 49	35.5	○		Takahashi
TN	Ukan Tunnel				Length - 1,529 m (5,016 ft)	Takahashi
TN	Ukan Tunnel				Length - 1,529 m (5,016 ft)	Maniwa
BS	Hokubō Mizuta BS		43.1	○		Maniwa
(17)	Hokubō JCT	Chūgoku Expressway	43.9			Maniwa
