= Harima Expressway =

Expressway in Hyōgo Prefecture, Japan

Harima Expressway
- 播磨自動車道

Route information
- Length: 24.2 km (15.0 mi)
- Existed: 2003–present

Major junctions
- From: Harima Junction in Tatsuno, Hyōgo; San'yō Expressway
- To: Yamazaki Junction in Shisō, Hyōgo; Chūgoku Expressway

Location
- Country: Japan
- Major cities: Tatsuno, Aioi, Shisō

Highway system
- National highways of Japan; Expressways of Japan

The Harima Expressway (播磨自動車道, Harima Jidōsha-dō) is a national expressway in Hyōgo Prefecture, Japan. It is owned and operated by West Nippon Expressway Company. It is signed as E29 under the Ministry of Land, Infrastructure, Transport and Tourism's "2016 Proposal for Realization of Expressway Numbering."

== Naming ==
The expressway is officially referred to as the Chūgoku-Ōdan Expressway Himeji Tottori Route. The Chūgoku-Ōdan Expressway Himeji Tottori Route is the official designation for the Sanyō Expressway between Sanyō Himeji-Nishi Interchange and Harima Junction, the Harima Expressway between Harima Junction and Yamazaki Junction, the Chūgoku Expressway between Yamazaki Junction and Sayo Junction, and the Tottori Expressway between Sayo Junction and Tottori Interchange (concurrent with the Chūgoku-Ōdan Expressway Himeji Tottori Route).

== Route description ==
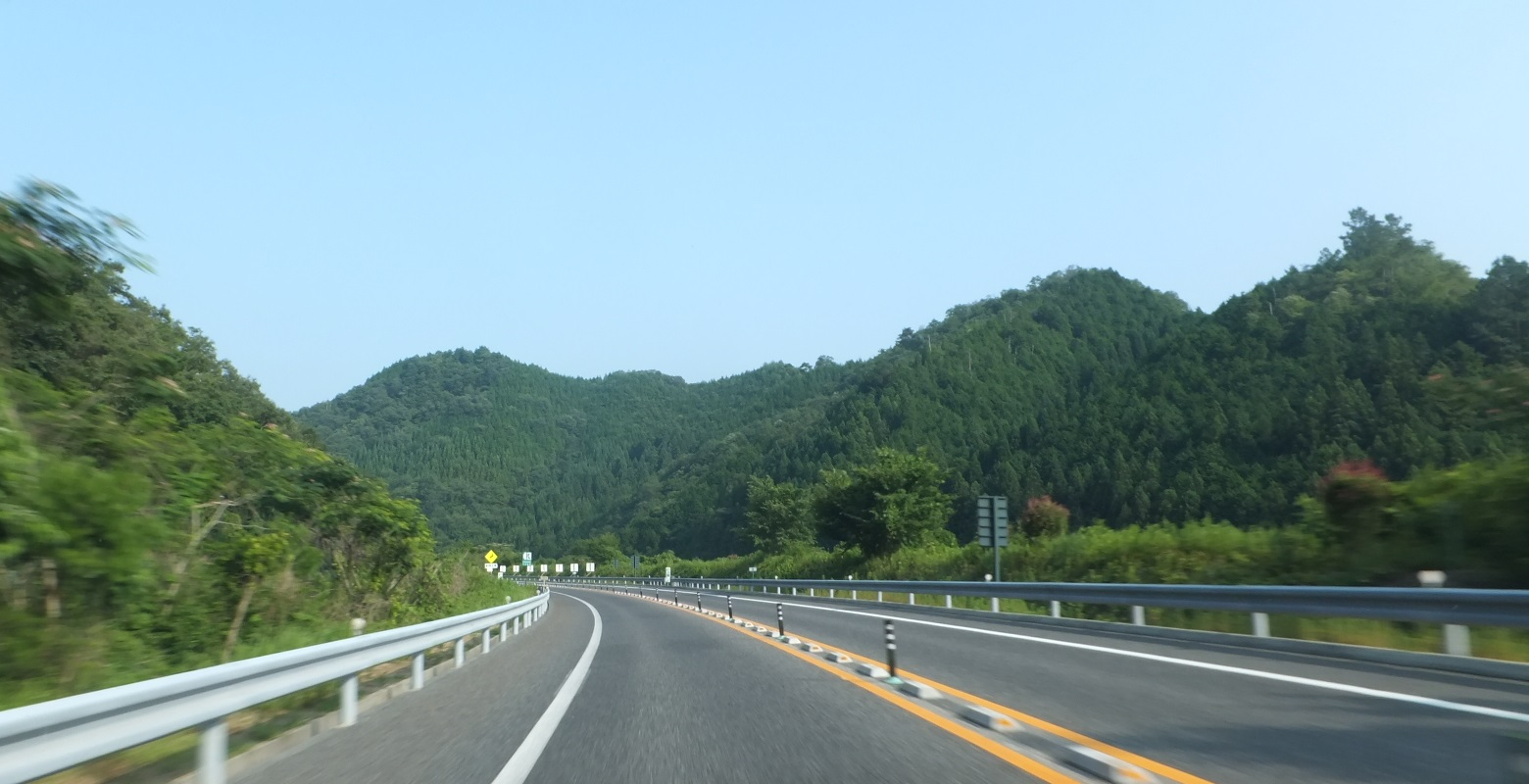
A typical section of the Harima Expressway

The route is a two-lane expressway for its entire length, with some overtaking areas. The speed limit is 70 km/h.

== History ==
The first section of the expressway was opened in 2003. As of August 2019, that 12.8 kilometres (8.0 mi) long section between the Sanyō Expressway and Hyōgo Prefecture Route 726 is still the only part of it open to traffic.

== Future ==
The Harima Expressway is planned to be completed between its current northern terminus at Hyōgo Prefecture Route 726 and the Chūgoku Expressway in 2021. Upon completion, the total length of the expressway will be 24.2 kilometres (15.0 mi).

== Junction list ==
The entire expressway is in Hyōgo Prefecture.

| Location | km | mi | Exit | Name | Destinations | Notes |
|---|---|---|---|---|---|---|
| Tatsuno | 0.0 | 0.0 | 9–1 | Harima | San'yō Expressway– Kobe, Akō, Okayama | Southern terminus |
| Tatsuno | 12.8 | 8.0 | 1 | Harima-Shingū | Hyōgo Pref. Route 726 (Harima-Shingū Interchange Route) | Current northern terminus |
| Shisō | | | – | Hokubō | Chūgoku Expressway | Future northern terminus;p scheduled to open to traffic in 2021. |
1.000 mi = 1.609 km; 1.000 km = 0.621 mi: Unopened
