= Hamada Expressway =

Expressway in Hiroshima and Shimane prefecture, Japan

Hamada Expressway
- 浜田自動車道

Route information
- Length: 56.6 km (35.2 mi)
- Existed: 1989–present

Major junctions
- From: Chiyoda Junction in Kitahiroshima, Hiroshima; Chūgoku Expressway
- To: Hamada Interchange in Hamada, Shimane; National Route 9

Location
- Country: Japan
- Major cities: Ōnan

Highway system
- National highways of Japan; Expressways of Japan

The Hamada Expressway (浜田自動車道, Hamada Jidōsha-dō) is a national expressway in the Chūgoku region of Japan. It is owned and operated by West Nippon Expressway Company.

== Overview ==
The expressway is officially referred to as the Chūgoku-Ōdan Expressway Hiroshima Hamada Route. Together with the Chūgoku Expressway and Hiroshima Expressway, the expressway forms a link connecting the greater Hiroshima area with western Shimane Prefecture.

The first section of the expressway was opened to traffic in 1989 and the entire route was completed in 1991. The entire route is 2 lanes with the exception of the short (1.3 km) section between Hamada Junction and Hamada Interchange.

== List of interchanges and features ==
- IC - interchange, SIC - smart interchange, JCT - junction, SA - service area, PA - parking area, BS - bus stop, TN - tunnel, BR - bridge

No.	Name	Connections	Dist. from Origin	Bus Stop	Notes	Location	
(25)	Chiyoda JCT	Chūgoku Expressway	0.0			Kitahiroshima	Hiroshima
BS	Chiyoda-nishi BS		2.1	○		Kitahiroshima	Hiroshima
-	Kurasako Chain Base		4.8			Kitahiroshima	Hiroshima
1	Ōasa IC	National Route 261; Hiroshima Prefectural Route 5	12.6	○		Kitahiroshima	Hiroshima
PA	Kanbikizan PA		16.5			Kitahiroshima	Hiroshima
-	Ōtsuka Chain Base		18.7			Kitahiroshima	Hiroshima
TN	Inokoyama Tunnel				Length - 2,595 m (8,514 ft)	Kitahiroshima	Hiroshima
TN	Inokoyama Tunnel				Length - 2,595 m (8,514 ft)	Ōnan	Shimane
-	Ichiki Chain Base		22.3		adjacent to Inokoyama Tunnel	Ōnan	Shimane
2	Mizuho IC	Shimane Prefectural Route 5 Shimane Prefectural Route 50	24.2	○		Ōnan	Shimane
-	Chain Base				only accessible to Chiyoda JCT-bound traffic	Hamada	Shimane
BS	Shigetomi BS		34.9	○		Hamada	Shimane
-	Asahi Chain Base		36.0			Hamada	Shimane
3	Asahi IC	Shimane Prefectural Route 52; Shimane Prefectural Route 329	39.2	○		Hamada	Shimane
3-1	Kanagi PA/SIC		47.0	○		Hamada	Shimane
3-2	Hamada JCT	San'in Expressway	55.3			Hamada	Shimane
TB	Hamada TB		56.0			Hamada	Shimane
4	Hamada IC	National Route 9 (Hamada Bypass)	56.6			Hamada	Shimane
