= Hiroshima Expressway (West Nippon Expressway Company) =

National expressway in Hiroshima Prefecture, Japan

Hiroshima Expressway
- 広島自動車道

Route information
- Length: 17.2 km (10.7 mi)
- Existed: 1983–present

Major junctions
- From: Hiroshima Junction in Asaminami-ku, Hiroshima; Sanyō Expressway
- To: Hiroshima-kita Junction in Asakita-ku, Hiroshima; Chūgoku Expressway

Location
- Country: Japan
- Major cities: Hiroshima

Highway system
- National highways of Japan; Expressways of Japan

The Hiroshima Expressway (広島自動車道, Hiroshima Jidōsha-dō) is a national expressway in Hiroshima Prefecture, Japan. It is owned and operated by West Nippon Expressway Company.

== Naming ==
The expressway is officially referred to as the Chūgoku-Ōdan Expressway Hiroshima Hamada Route. The Chūgoku-Ōdan Expressway Hiroshima Hamada Route is the official designation for the Sanyō Expressway between Hiroshima Interchange and Hiroshima Junction, the Hiroshima Expressway between Hiroshima Junction and Hiroshima-kita Junction, the Chūgoku Expressway between Hiroshima-kita Junction and Chiyoda Junction, and the Hamada Expressway between Chiyoda Junction and Hamada Interchange (concurrent with the Chūgoku-Ōdan Expressway Hiroshima Hamada Route).

== Overview ==
The expressway is a short connector route linking Chūgoku Expressway with the Sanyō Expressway.

Although the route officially originates at Hiroshima Junction, the southern terminus and terminates at Hiroshima-kita Junction, the northern terminus, exit numbers and kilometer markings originate from Hiroshima-kita Junction.

== List of interchanges and features ==
- IC - interchange, SIC - smart interchange, JCT - junction, SA - service area, PA - parking area, BS - bus stop, TN - tunnel, BR - bridge

No.	Name	Connections	Dist. from Origin	Bus Stop	Notes	Location
(26)	Hiroshima-kita JCT	Chūgoku Expressway	0.0			Asakita-ku, Hiroshima
1	Hiroshima-kita IC	National Route 191; National Route 261; Hiroshima-kita Road (planning)	2.8	○		Asakita-ku, Hiroshima
PA	Kuchi PA		10.5			Asakita-ku, Hiroshima
BS	Kuchi BS		11.7	○		Asakita-ku, Hiroshima
2	Hiroshima Seifū Shinto IC		13.2		opened on July 6, 2001	Asaminami-ku, Hiroshima
(3)	Hiroshima JCT	Sanyō Expressway	17.2			Asaminami-ku, Hiroshima
