= Onomichi Expressway =

Expressway in Hiroshima Prefecture, Japan

Onomichi Expressway
- 尾道自動車道

Route information
- Length: 49.9 km (31.0 mi)
- Existed: 2010–present

Major junctions
- From: Onomichi Junction in Onomichi, Hiroshima; Sanyō Expressway
- To: Miyoshi-Higashi Junction/IC in Miyoshi, Hiroshima; Chūgoku Expressway

Location
- Country: Japan
- Major cities: Sera

Highway system
- National highways of Japan; Expressways of Japan

The Onomichi Expressway (尾道自動車道, Onomichi Jidōsha-dō) is a national expressway in the Chūgoku region of Japan. It is owned and operated by West Nippon Expressway Company.

== Naming ==
The expressway is officially referred to as the Chūgoku-Ōdan Expressway Onomichi Matsue Route. The Chūgoku-Ōdan Expressway Onomichi Matsue Route is the official designation for the Sanyō Expressway between Onomichi Interchange and Hiroshima Junction, the Onomichi Expressway between Onomichi Junction and Miyoshi-Higashi Junction, and the Matsue Expressway between Miyoshi-Higashi Junction and Matsue Interchange (concurrent with the Chūgoku-Ōdan Expressway Onomichi Matsue Route).

== Overview ==
The first section of the expressway was opened in 2010. The final section of the expressway (18.4 km between Kisa Interchange and Sera Interchange) was opened on March 22, 2015. The route originates from its junction with the Sanyō Expressway and extends northward. At its northern terminus it connects to the Chūgoku Expressway. The entire route is toll-free with the exception of the short (0.9 km) section between Onomichi Junction and Onomichi Toll Gate.

The route is 2 lanes for its entire length, with some overtaking areas. The speed limit is 70 km/h.

== List of interchanges and features ==
- IC - interchange, SIC - smart interchange, JCT - junction, SA - service area, PA - parking area, BS - bus stop, TN - tunnel, BR - bridge

No.	Name	Connections	Dist. from Origin	Bus Stop	Notes	Location
Through to Nishiseto Expressway (planned)
(22-1)	Onomichi JCT	Sanyō Expressway	0.0			Onomichi
TB	Onomichi TB		0.9			Onomichi
1	Onomichi-Kita IC	National Route 486	7.0			Onomichi
2	Sera IC	National Route 432	19.2			Sera
3	Konu IC	Hiroshima Prefectural Route 424	31.5			Miyoshi
4	Kisa IC	National Route 184	39.6			Miyoshi
5	Mirasaka IC	Hiroshima Prefectural Route 61	44.0			Miyoshi
(21-1) 1	Miyoshi-Higashi JCT; Miyoshi-Higashi IC	Chūgoku Expressway; Hiroshima Prefectural Route 434	49.9			Miyoshi
Through to Matsue Expressway
