= Hiroshima Expressway (urban expressway) =

Urban expressway network in Hiroshima, Japan

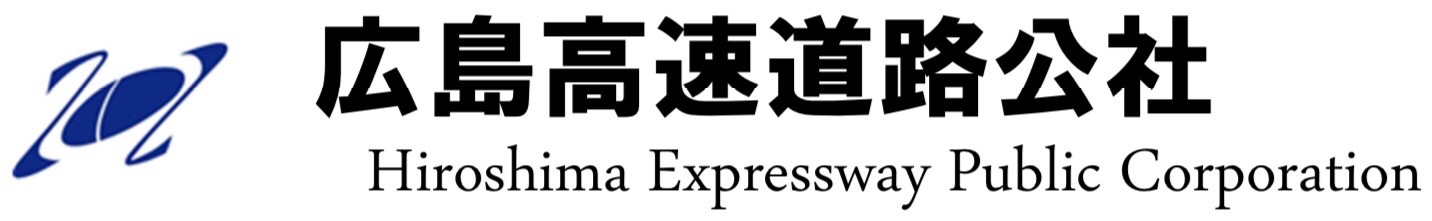
Hiroshima Expressway Public Corporation logo

The Hiroshima Expressway (広島高速道路, Hiroshima Kōsokudōro) is a network of urban expressways serving the greater Hiroshima area in Japan. It is owned and managed by Hiroshima Expressway Public Corporation.

== Routes ==
1. Aki Fuchū Route (安芸府中道路)
2. Fuchu Niho Route (府中仁保道路)
3. Hiroshima Minami Route (広島南道路)
4. Hiroshima Seifū Shinto Route (広島西風新都線)
5. Hiroshima Eastern Route (東部線)
