= List of toll roads =

The following is a list of toll roads. Toll roads are roads on which a toll authority collects a fee for use. This list also contains toll bridges and toll tunnels. Lists of these subsets of toll roads can be found in List of toll bridges and List of toll tunnels.

== Albania ==
- A1

== Argentina ==
- Autopista Pascual Palazzo
- Tigre Access

== Australia ==
=== Sydney, New South Wales ===
- Sydney Harbour Bridge
- Sydney Harbour Tunnel
- M1 Eastern Distributor
- M2 Hills Motorway
- Lane Cove Tunnel (formerly Lane Cove Valley Freeway under the 1960s Sydney Freeway Plan)
- NorthConnex
- WestConnex (M4 and M8 complete, M4-M5 Link Under Construction)
- M4 Motorway (Sydney)
- M5 Motorway
- Westlink M7
- Cross City Tunnel

=== Brisbane, Queensland ===
- Sir Leo Hielscher Bridges
- Go Between Bridge
- M2 Logan Motorway
- M5 Legacy Way
- M7 Airport Link
- M7 Clem Jones Tunnel
- East–West Distributor Motorway (Proposed)

=== Melbourne, Victoria ===
- CityLink
- Domain Tunnel
- Burnley Tunnel
- EastLink
- North East Link (Proposed)

== Austria ==
Main roads, open all year:

- Arlbergtunnel (S16)
- Brennerautobahn (A13), between Schönberg im Stubaital and the border to Italy
- Felbertauerntunnel
- Gerlospass, only new road, old road is still open and toll-free
- Karawanken Tunnel (motorway) (A11)
- Two tunnels on the Pyhrnautobahn (A9) (Gleinalm and Bosruck tunnels)
- Tauernautobahn (A10), between Flachauwinkl and Rennweg am Katschberg

But also all Controlled and Limited Access Roads (A # Autobahn = freeways and S # Schnellstraße = highways) via a sticker. http://www.asfinag.at/home-en for more information

Several mountain roads also charge tolls and are open only in summer:

- Grossglockner High Alpine Road (Großglockner-Hochalpenstraße)
- Silvretta Hochalpenstraße
- Timmelsjoch Hochalpenstrasse

== Azerbaijan ==
- Baku - Guba - Samur (Azerbaijan–Russia border)
- Ahmadbeyli–Fuzuli–Shusha highway

== Belarus ==
- М1/E30 - Brest (Kozlovichi)–Minsk–Russian Border (Red’ki)
- M2 - Minsk–Minsk National Airport
- M3 - Minsk–Vitebsk
- M4 - Minsk–Mogilev
- M5/E271 - Minsk–Gomel
- M6/E28 - Minsk–Grodno–Polish Border (Bruzgi)

== Belgium ==
- Liefkenshoek Tunnel

== Brazil ==
=== Bahia ===
- (BA-093) BA-093|Sistema BA-093
- (BA-099) Estrada do Coco
- (BR-116) Rodovia Presidente Dutra
- (BR-324) Rodovia Salvador-Feira

=== São Paulo ===
- (BR-116) Rodovia Presidente Dutra
- (BR-381) Rodovia Fernão Dias
- (SP-021) Rodoanel Mário Covas
- (SP-070) Rodovia Ayrton Senna
- (SP-150) Rodovia Anchieta
- (SP-160) Rodovia dos Imigrantes
- (SP-280) Rodovia Castelo Branco
- (SP-310) Rodovia Washington Luís
- (SP-330) Rodovia Anhangüera
- (SP-348) Rodovia dos Bandeirantes

== Canada ==
=== Alberta ===
- Highway 93

=== British Columbia ===
- None as of 2017.

=== New Brunswick ===
- Saint John Harbour Bridge (Former toll bridge)

=== Nova Scotia ===
- Cobequid Pass C$4
- Angus L. Macdonald Bridge C$1.25 (toll removed March 17, 2025)
- A. Murray MacKay Bridge C$1.25 (toll removed March 17, 2025)

=== Ontario ===
Tolled international crossings to United States

- Ambassador Bridge
- Blue Water Bridge
- Detroit–Windsor Tunnel
- Gordie Howe International Bridge
- Ogdensburg–Prescott International Bridge
- Peace Bridge
- Queenston–Lewiston Bridge
- Rainbow Bridge
- Seaway International Bridge (Three Nations Crossing)
- Sault Ste. Marie International Bridge
- Thousand Islands Bridge
- Whirlpool Rapids Bridge

Tolled highways and expressways

- Ontario Highway 407

==== Formerly tolled roadways ====
- Burlington Bay James N. Allan Skyway (tolls collected from 1958 to 1973)
- Garden City Skyway (tolls collected from 1963 to 1973)
- Ontario Highway 412
- Ontario Highway 418

==== Planned but cancelled high-occupancy toll lanes ====
- Queen Elizabeth Way

=== Prince Edward Island ===
- Confederation Bridge

=== Quebec ===
- A25 bridge
- Autoroute 30

==== Formerly tolled ====
- Champlain Bridge
- Jacques Cartier Bridge
- Laurentian Autoroute
- Eastern Autoroute
- Chomedey Autoroute
- North Shore Autoroute

== Chile ==
- Costanera Norte
- Autopista del Sol
- Chile Highway 5
- Autopista Troncal Sur
- Autopista del Itata
- Autopistas de Antofagasta
- Autopistas del Desierto
- Autopista Rutas del Pacifico
- Autopista Rutas del Biobio
- Autopista Los Libertadores
- Autopista los Andes
- Autopista Vespucio Norte Express
- Autopista Vespucio Sur

== China ==
=== Beijing ===
- 6th Ring Road (Beijing)
- Airport Expressway (Beijing)
- Badaling Expressway
- Jingcheng Expressway
- Jingha Expressway
- Jingjintang Expressway
- Jingkai Expressway
- Jingshen Expressway
- Jingshi Expressway
- Jingtong Expressway
- Jingzhang Expressway

=== Others ===
- Guangshen Expressway
- Tangjin Expressway
- Xuanda Expressway
- Yingbin Expressway

== Croatia ==
=== Motorways ===
- A1 - Lučko - Karamatići
- A2 - 58.2 km (36.2 mi) of 79.4 km (49.3 mi) tolled: Trakošćan - Zaprešić
- A3 - 267.2 km (166.0 mi) of 306.5 km (190.5 mi) tolled: Bregana - Bobovica and Rugvica - Lipovac
- A4 - 76.4 km (47.5 mi) of 96.4 km (59.9 mi) tolled: Goričan - Sveta Helena
- A5 - Osijek - Svilaj
- A6 - 70.0 km (43.5 mi) of 79.4 km (49.3 mi) tolled: Bosiljevo 2 - Kikovica
- A7 - 9.5 km (5.9 mi) of 37.7 km (23.4 mi) tolled: Rupa - Jurdani
- A8 - 28.2 km (17.5 mi) of 64.0 km (39.8 mi) tolled: Kanfanar - Cerovlje
- A9 - Umag - Pula
- A10 - Kula Norinska - Ploče
- A11 - Velika Gorica Jug - Lekenik

=== Tunnels ===
- Učka Tunnel

== Denmark ==
- Great Belt Fixed Link
- Øresund Bridge

== Faroe Islands ==
- Eysturoyartunnilin
- Norðoyatunnilin
- Sandoyartunnilin
- Vágatunnilin

== Germany ==
- Warnow Tunnel
- Herrentunnel
- LKW-Maut A nationwide toll on large trucks.

== Hong Kong ==
- Aberdeen Tunnel
- Cross-Harbour Tunnel
- Eagle's Nest Tunnel and Sha Tin Heights Tunnel
- Eastern Harbour Crossing
- Lion Rock Tunnel
- Shing Mun Tunnels
- Tai Lam Tunnel
- Tai Wai Tunnel
- Tate's Cairn Tunnel
- Western Harbour Crossing

== India ==
Gurgaon to Simla

- Nizamabad to Nellor
- Adilabad to Kurnool (AP) (NH 7, New NH 44)
- Hyderabad to Raigiri (NH 202, New NH 163 towards Warangal)
- Sangareddy (Hyderabad) to Vijayawada (AP) (NH 9, New NH 65)
- Hyderabad to Dameracherla

=== Andhra Pradesh ===
- National Highway 5 (New NH65) (Tada to Srikakulam)
- Hyderabad to Chennai (New No. NAM Expressway)
- Kurnool to Bangalore (KA) (NH 7, New NH 44)
- Kurnool to Kadapa (Rayalaseema Expressway)
- Kodad (TG) to Vijayawada (NH 9, New NH 16)
- Eluru NH5 (New NH16)
- Tanuku NH5 (New NH16)
- Vijayawada to Visakhapatnam

=== Maharashtra ===
- Mumbai–Pune Expressway, Mumbai
- Western Expressway, Mumbai
- Eastern Expressway, Mumbai
- Sion Panvel Highway, Mumbai
- Western Freeway, Mumbai
- Eastern Freeway, Mumbai
- Mumbai–Vadodara Expressway, Mumbai to Gujarat
- Mumbai–Nashik Expressway, Mumbai to Nashik
- Pune to Satara
- Satara to Karad to Kolhapur
- Shil Phata to Kalyan
- Pune to Solapur
- Airoli to Mulund

=== Delhi ===
- DND Flyway
- Delhi–Gurgaon Expressway
- Taj Expressway
- Ganga Expressway
- Delhi–Faridabad Skyway - DF Skyway

=== Uttar Pradesh ===
- Taj Expressway (Under construction)
- Ganga Expressway (proposed)
- Kanpur Metropolitan Expressway (Under construction)

=== Karnataka ===
- NH 4 from Nelamangala till Maharashtra border
- NH 4 from Krishnarajapuram till Tamil Nadu border
- NH 48 from Nelamangala till Hassan
- NH 50 from Bijapur till Hospet
- Bengaluru Elevated Tollway
- Bangalore–Nelamangala Expressway
- Bangalore–Kempegowda International Airport (KIA) Expressway
- Brahamarakotlu Toll Plaza - National Highway 73 Mangalore–Bangalore National Highway
- Talapady Toll Gate - NH 66

=== Tamil Nadu ===
- East Coast Road (ECR) from Chennai to Pondicherry
- Chennai Bye Pass Road from Irumbuliyur, Chennai to NH4 Madhavaram, Chennai
- Chennai ECR - Sholinganallur Road from ECR, Chennai to Sholinganallur, Chennai
- Chennai OMR - Medavakkam Road from Sholinganallur, Chennai to Medavakkam, Chennai
- NH 47 Salem to Coimbatore Expressway / Industrial Corridor
- NH 67 Coimbatore to Trichy
- NH 7 Hosur to Krishnagiri
- NH 4 Krishnagiri to Chennai
- NH 45 Chennai to Villupuram
- NH 7 Krishnagiri to Salem
- NH 45B Madurai to Tuticorin (Nearing completion)
- NH 45 Dindigul to Trichy
- NH 45 Villuppuram to Trichy
- NH 7 Salem to Madurai (Nearing completion)
- NH 7A Tirunelveli to Tuticorin
- Chennai to Ennore Express Way (Inner Ring Road & Manali Oil Refinery Rd.)
- NH 45B Madurai to Trichy
- NH 83 Thanjavur to Trichy

== Iran ==
- Freeway 2
- Freeway 5
- Freeway 7
- Shahid Kalantary Bridge (Tabriz-Urmia)

== Iceland ==
- Vaðlaheiðargöng tunnel - East of Akureyri (automatic toll collection)

Previously, the Hvalfjarðargöng tunnel was tolled from its opening in 1998 until 2018, and the Reykjanesbraut road was tolled from 1965 to 1972.

== Ireland ==
- M1 Motorway - Between Junction 7 and Junction 10 (15 km)
- M3 motorway - Between Junction 5 and 6 (11 km) / Junction 9 and 10 (11 km)
- M4 motorway - Between Junction 8 and Junction 10 (28.5 km)
- M6 motorway - Between Junction 15 and Junction 16 (26.5 km)
- M7/M8 motorway - Between Junction 18 and Junction 21 (27 km) / Junction 3 on the M8 and Junction 18 (23 km)
- M8 motorway - Between Junction 15 and Junction 17 (13 km)
- N25 Waterford city bypass (Suir River Bridge) - Between Junction for the M9/N24 and the Junction for R710 (3 km)
- Limerick Tunnel - Between Junction 2 and Junction 4 on the N18 Road (6 km)
- East-Link (Dublin Port)
- Dublin Port Tunnel
- West-Link (M50 Motorway, Dublin) - Between Junction 6 and Junction 7 (4 km)

== Israel ==
- Highway 6 (Yitzhak Rabin Cross Israel Highway)
- Carmel Tunnels
- Express Lane in Highway 1

== Italy ==
Almost all the so-called "autostrada" are toll roads. Some examples:

- Autostrada A1 (Italy)
- Autostrada A4 (Italy)
- Autostrada A5 (Italy)
- Autostrada A6 (Italy)
- Autostrada A7 (Italy)
- Autostrada A10 (Italy)
- Autostrada A12 (Italy)
- Autostrada A18 (Italy)
- Autostrada A20 (Italy)
- Autostrada A32 (Italy)

== Japan ==
Almost all expressways in Japan are toll roads.

=== East Japan ===
(operated by NEXCO East Japan)

- E7 E46 Akita Expressway
- E4A Aomori Expressway
- E49 Ban-etsu Expressway
- E38 E61 Dōtō Expressway
- E4A Hachinohe Expressway
- E51 Higashi-Kantō Expressway
- E5 Hokkaidō Expressway
- E8 Hokuriku Expressway
- E6 Jōban Expressway
- E18 Jōshin-etsu Expressway
- E46 Kamaishi Expressway
- E17 Kan-Etsu Expressway
- C4 E66 Ken-Ō Expressway
- E50 Kita-Kantō Expressway
- E19 Nagano Expressway
- E7 Nihonkai-Tōhoku Expressway
- E5A Sasson Expressway
- E65 Shin-Kūkō Expressway
- E14 Tateyama Expressway
- E4 E13 E48 Tōhoku Expressway
- E13 Tōhoku-Chūō Expressway
- C3 Tokyo Gaikan Expressway
- E48 Yamagata Expressway

=== Central Japan ===
(operated by NEXCO Central Japan)

- E52 Chūbu-Ōdan Expressway
- E20 E52 Chūō Expressway
- E23 Higashi-Meihan Expressway
- E8 Hokuriku Expressway
- E23 Ise Expressway
- E1A Isewangan Expressway
- C4 Ken-Ō Expressway
- E42 Kisei Expressway
- E1 Meishin Expressway
- E19 Nagano Expressway
- E1A Shin-Meishin Expressway
- E52 Shin-Tōmei Expressway
- E41 Tōkai-Hokuriku Expressway
- E1 Tōmei Expressway

=== West Japan ===
(operated by NEXCO West Japan)

- E2A E29 E73 E74 Chūgoku Expressway
- E74 Hamada Expressway
- E26 E42 Hanwa Expressway
- E29 Harima Expressway
- E10 Higashi-Kyūshū Expressway
- E74 Hiroshima Expressway
- E2A Kanmonkyo Bridge
- E71 Kansai-Kūkō Expressway
- E26 E42 Kinki Expressway
- E32 Kōchi Expressway
- E3 Kyūshū Expressway
- E27 Maizuru-Wakasa Expressway
- E54 Matsue Expressway
- E11 E56 Matsuyama Expressway
- E1 Meishin Expressway
- E10 Miyazaki Expressway
- E34 Nagasaki Expressway
- E25 Nishi-Meihan Expressway
- E34 Ōita Expressway
- E73 Okayama Expressway
- E58 Okinawa Expressway
- E54 Onomichi Expressway
- E9 San-in Expressway
- E2 Sanyō Expressway
- E1A Shin-Meishin Expressway
- E11 Takamatsu Expressway
- E32 Tokushima Expressway
- E73 Yonago Expressway
- E28 Kobe-Awaji-Naruto Expressway
- E76 Nishiseto Expressway
- E30 Seto-Chūō Expressway

=== Urban Expressways ===
- Fukuoka & Kitakyūshū Expressways
- Hanshin Expressway
- Hiroshima Expressway (urban)
- Nagoya Expressway
- Shuto Expressway
- Tokyo Expressway

== Malaysia ==
- East Coast Expressway
- Kajang–Seremban Highway
- New Klang Valley Expressway
- North–South Expressway
  - North–South Expressway Northern Route
  - North–South Expressway Southern Route
- North–South Expressway Central Link
- South Klang Valley Expressway
- West Coast Expressway

== Mexico ==
=== Federal highways ===
The first tolled Mexican federal highway, between Amacuzac, State of Mexico, and Iguala, opened in 1952 and provided the first partial high-speed connection on the Mexico-Acapulco route. Dozens of toll highways now exist in Mexico, referred to as autopistas or supercarreteras.

Most federal toll roads are four lanes, though some, especially in mountainous areas, are two. Toll (quota) roads provide high-speed alternatives to non-toll federal highways as well as bypasses of major and mid-sized cities.

=== State highways ===
Aside from federal highways whose concessions are held by state government agencies, such as much of Fed 45D in Chihuahua and Zacatecas or Fed 2D from La Rumorosa to Mexicali, Baja California, there are also state toll roads, whose concessions were issued by state governments.

== Netherlands ==
- Kiltunnel
- Westerscheldetunnel
- A24

== Norway ==
City toll rings, generally payments for all entrances to a city, regardless if each road is upgraded or not. The money is used for local road and railway projects.

- Ålesund
- Bergen
- Bodø
- Førde
- Harstad
- Haugesund
- Kristiansand
- Oslo (3 concentric rings)
- Skien
- Stavanger
- Tromsø
- Trondheim

Road tolls, for newly build roads, generally active 15–20 years after its opening, sometimes covering the old road also to avoid loopholes.

- E6 Gardermoen–Tretten
- E6 Trondheim–Stjørdalshalsen
- E6 through Helgeland
- E6 Hålogaland Bridge
- E16 Kløfta–Kongsvinger
- E18 Tønsberg–Arendal
- E39 Kristiansand–Mandal
- E39 Lyshorn Tunnel
- E134 through Kongsberg
- road 7 near Sokna
- road 13 Hardanger Bridge and Ryfylke Tunnel
- road 17 near Steinkjer
- road 78 Toven Tunnel
- road 659 Nordøyvegen
- road 714 towards Hitra

Not a complete list. Updated 2023.

== Madagascar ==
- Antananarivo–Toamasina toll highway

== Morocco ==
- Casablanca–Safi
- Casablanca–Marrakesh
- Casablanca–Rabat
- Fes–Oujda
- Marrakesh–Agadir
- Rabat–Fes
- Rabat–Tanger
- Tétouan–Fnideq

== New Zealand ==
- Northern Gateway Toll Road - Northern Motorway section from Orewa Interchange to Puhoi
- Takitimu Drive (aka Route K), Tauranga
- Tauranga Eastern Link

=== Formerly tolled ===
- Auckland Harbour Bridge (became a free road on 30 March 1984)
- Lyttelton road tunnel (became a free road on 1 April 1979)
- Tauranga Harbour Bridge (became a free road in July 2001)

== Panama ==
- Corridor Sur - South of Panama City, Punta Pacifica - Tocumen Int'l Airport
- Corridor Norte - North of Panama City
- Conexion Corridor Sur y Norte - Panama City, will connect both highways, sections of it are still being planned, some are already being built.

== Philippines ==
- North Luzon Expressway
- South Luzon Expressway
- Metro Manila Skyway
- STAR Tollway
- NAIA Expressway
- Muntinlupa–Cavite Expressway
- Manila–Cavite Expressway
- Subic Freeport Expressway
- Subic–Clark–Tarlac Expressway
- Tarlac–Pangasinan–La Union Expressway
- Cebu-Cordova Link Expressway
- Cavite-Laguna Expressway

== Poland ==
- Autostrada A1
- Autostrada A2
- Autostrada A4

== Russia ==
- Toll road from Moscow to Saint Petersburg
- Western Rapid Diameter in Saint Petersburg
- Platon (toll system) nationwide

== Sri Lanka ==
- Colombo-Matara Expressway
- Colombo-Katunayake Expressway

== South Africa ==
Toll Roads (60 Toll Gates)

- N1
  - Huguenot, Vaal, Grasmere, Verkeerdevlei, Stormvoël, Zambesi, Pumulani, Wallmansthal, Murrayhill, Hammanskraal, Carousel, Maubane, Kranskop, Nyl, Zebetiela, Baobab, Capricorn
- N2
  - Tsitsikamma, Ndwalane (future N2 Wild Coast Toll Road), Mthentu (N2 WCTR), Izotsha, Oribi, Umtentweni, oThongathi, King Shaka Airport, Mvoti, Mandini, Dokodweni, Mtunzini
- N3
  - Mariannhill, Mooi, Treverton, Bergville, Tugela, Tugela East, Wilge, De Hoek
- N4
  - Swartruggens, Kroondal, Marikana, Buffelspoort, Brits, K99, Doornpoort, Donkerhoek West, Cullinan, Diamond Hill, Valtaki East, Ekandustria East, Middelburg, Machadodorp, Nkomazi
- N17
  - Gosforth, Dalpark, Denne, Leandra, Trichardt, Ermelo
- R30
  - Brandfort
- M4 (Pretoria)
  - Quagga, Pelindaba
- M6 (Cape Town)
  - Chapmans Peak Drive

== Sweden ==
- Gothenburg congestion tax
- Stockholm congestion tax
- Øresund Bridge - bridge toll - E20
- Sundsvall Bridge - bridge toll - E4
- Motalabron - bridge toll - route 50
- Skuru Bridge - bridge toll - route 222

== South Korea ==
- Gyeongbu Expressway
- Namhae Expressway
- Muan–Gwangju Expressway
- Gwangju–Daegu Expressway
- Seohaean Expressway
- Ulsan Expressway
- Pyeongtaek–Paju Expressway
- Saemangeum–Pohang Expressway
- Honam Expressway
- Nonsan–Cheonan Expressway
- Suncheon–Wanju Expressway
- Sejong–Pocheon Expressway
- Seosan–Yeongdeok Expressway
- Tongyeong–Daejeon Expressway
- Jungbu Expressway
- Second Jungbu Expressway
- Pyeongtaek–Jecheon Expressway
- Jungbunaeryuk Expressway
- Yeongdong Expressway
- Gwangju–Wonju Expressway
- Jungang Expressway
- Seoul–Yangyang Expressway
- Donghae Expressway
- Capital Region First Ring Expressway
- Second Gyeongin Expressway
- Gyeongin Expressway
- Incheon International Airport Expressway
- Pyeongtaek–Siheung Expressway
- Osan–Hwaseong Expressway
- Yongin–Seoul Expressway

== Switzerland ==
- Grand Saint Bernard tunnel
- Munt la Schera tunnel

All motorways, including their tunnels, require a toll sticker which costs 40 francs per year (no shorter times available).

== Taiwan ==
- Freeway 1 (Taiwan)
- Freeway 3 (Taiwan)
- Freeway 5 (Taiwan)

== Thailand ==
Expressways in Thailand
Official name	Other name	Length	Operator
Chaloem Maha Nakhon	First Stage Expressway System	27.1 kilometres (16.8 mi)	Expressway Authority of Thailand
Sirat	Second Stage Expressway System	55.1 kilometres (34.2 mi)	BEM
Si Rat Expressway - (West Kanchanaphisek ring road)	Si Rat-Outer Ring Road(West)	16.7 kilometres (10.4 mi)	BEM
Uttaraphimuk Elevated Tollway	Don Mueang Tollway	28.2 kilometres (17.5 mi)	Don Mueang Tollway
Chalong Rat	Kanchanapisek-Ramindra–At Narong Expressway	28.2 kilometres (17.5 mi)	Expressway Authority of Thailand
Burapha Withi	Bang Na-Chonburi Expressway	55.0 kilometres (34.2 mi)	Expressway Authority of Thailand
Udon Ratthaya	Bang Pa-in –Pak Kret Expressway	32.0 kilometres (19.9 mi)	NECL-BEM
3nd Stage Expressway	Third Stage Expressway System, S1 section or At Narong–Bang Na Expressway	4.1 kilometres (2.5 mi)	Expressway Authority of Thailand
Kanchanapisek Expressway	Bang Phli–Suksawat Expressway or Southern Kanchanapisek Road	34.0 kilometres (21.1 mi)	Expressway Authority of Thailand
Motorway 7	Bangkok–Chonburi–Pattaya Expressway	125.9 kilometres (78.2 mi)	Department of Highways
Motorway 9	Eastern–Western Kanchanapisek Road	131 kilometres (81 mi)	Department of Highways
Total		535.3 kilometres (332.6 mi)	

== Turkey ==
- OGS
- Otoyol 1 -Istanbul Expressway (Bosphorus Bridge)-
- Otoyol 2 -Istanbul Expressway (Fatih Sultan Mehmet Bridge)-
- Otoyol 3 -Istanbul-Edirne Motorway-
- Otoyol 4 -Istanbul-Ankara Motorway-
- Otoyol 5 -Istanbul-İzmir
- Otoyol 6 -Malkara-Lapseki
- Otoyol 7 -Northern Marmara Motorway
- Otoyol 21 -Ankara-Adana
- Otoyol 31 -İzmir-Aydın Motorway-
- Otoyol 32 -İzmir-Çeşme Motorway-
- Otoyol 33 -Northern Izmir Motorway
- Otoyol 51 -Adana-Mersin Motorway
- Otoyol 52 -Adana-Şanlıurfa Motorway
- Otoyol 53 -Adana-İskenderun Motorway
- Otoyol 37 -İzmir Northern Egean Motorway

== United Arab Emirates ==
In Dubai, the Salik toll system was introduced on 1 July 2007. In Dubai, there at tolls at the following locations:

- Al Barsha
- Al Garhoud
- Al Maktoum
- Al Mamzar South
- Al Mamzar North
- Al Safa
- Airport Tunnel

== United Kingdom ==
England

- Aldwark Bridge, North Yorkshire
- Batheaston Bridge, Somerset
- Cartford Bridge, Lancashire
- Clifton Suspension Bridge, Bristol
- Dartford Crossing, Essex and Kent
- Dulwich College Road, Greater London
- Durham City congestion charge, County Durham
- Dunham Bridge, Lincolnshire and Nottinghamshire
- Hartland Point Access Road, Devon
- Humber Bridge, East Riding of Yorkshire and Lincolnshire
- Itchen Bridge, Hampshire
- Kingsland Bridge, Shropshire
- Kingsway Tunnel, Merseyside
- London congestion charge, Greater London
- M6 Toll, Staffordshire, Warwickshire and West Midlands
- Mersey Gateway Bridge, Cheshire
- Middlesbrough Transporter Bridge, County Durham and North Yorkshire
- Queensway Tunnel, Merseyside
- Rye Road, Hertfordshire
- Sandwich Bay Estate, Kent
- Silver Jubilee Bridge, Cheshire (Once re-opened after renovation)
- Swinford Bridge, Oxfordshire
- Tamar Bridge, Cornwall and Devon (eastbound only)
- Tyne Tunnel, Tyne and Wear
- Warburton Bridge, Cheshire and Greater Manchester
- Whitchurch Bridge, Berkshire and Oxfordshire
- Whitney-on-Wye toll bridge, Herefordshire

Wales

- Cleddau Bridge (Welsh: Pont Cleddau), Pembrokeshire
- Newport Transporter Bridge (Welsh: Pont Gludo Casnewydd), Newport
- Pont Briwet, Gwynedd

== Zambia ==
28 Tollgates

- T1
  - Kebby Musokotwane, Daniel Munkombwe
- T2
  - Shimabala, Katuba, Manyumbi, George Kunda SC, Chilonga
- T3
  - Kafulafuta, Michael Chilufya Sata, Wilson Mofya Chakulya, Konkola
- T4
  - Chongwe, Alexander Grey Zulu, Reuben C Kamanga
- T5
  - Humphrey Mulemba, Enoch Kavindele
- M1
  - Kateshi
- M3
  - Kalense, Ntoposhi
- M6
  - Abraham Mokola
- M9
  - Mumbwa, Mweeke
- M10
  - Lui
- M16
  - Sabina
- D1
  - Kakonde
- D94
  - Mibenge
- D319
  - Tapo
- D486
  - Mpongwe

== See also ==
- Geography of toll roads
