= M1 highway (Belarus) =

Major road in Belarus

M1
- Магістраль М1

Route information
- Part of E30 / E85
- Length: 611 km (380 mi)

Major junctions
- Southwest end: Brest
- Northeast end: Border with Russia

Location
- Country: Belarus
- Major cities: Brest, Baranavichy, Minsk, Barysaw, Orsha

Highway system
- Roads in Belarus

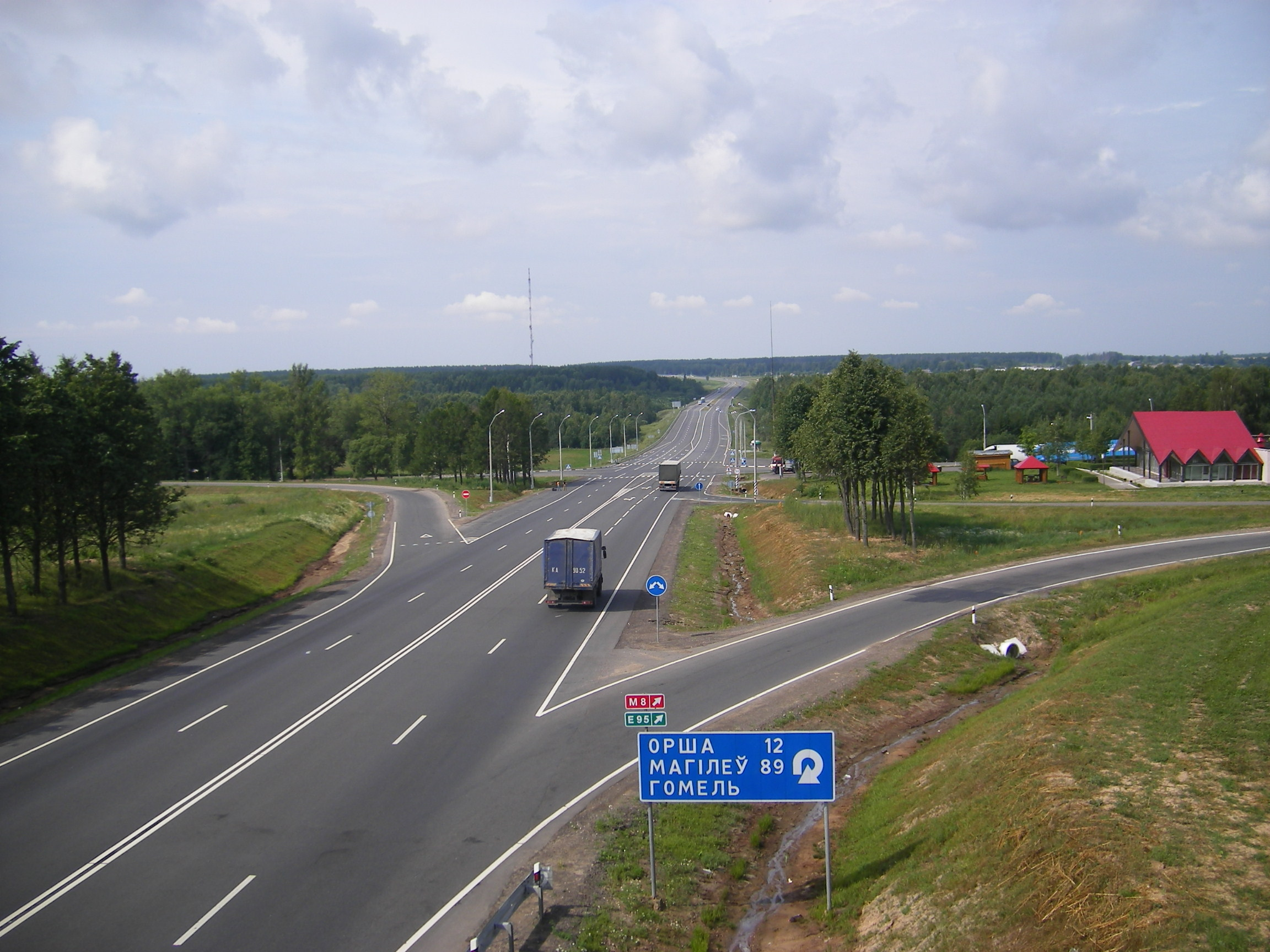
The M1 near Orsha

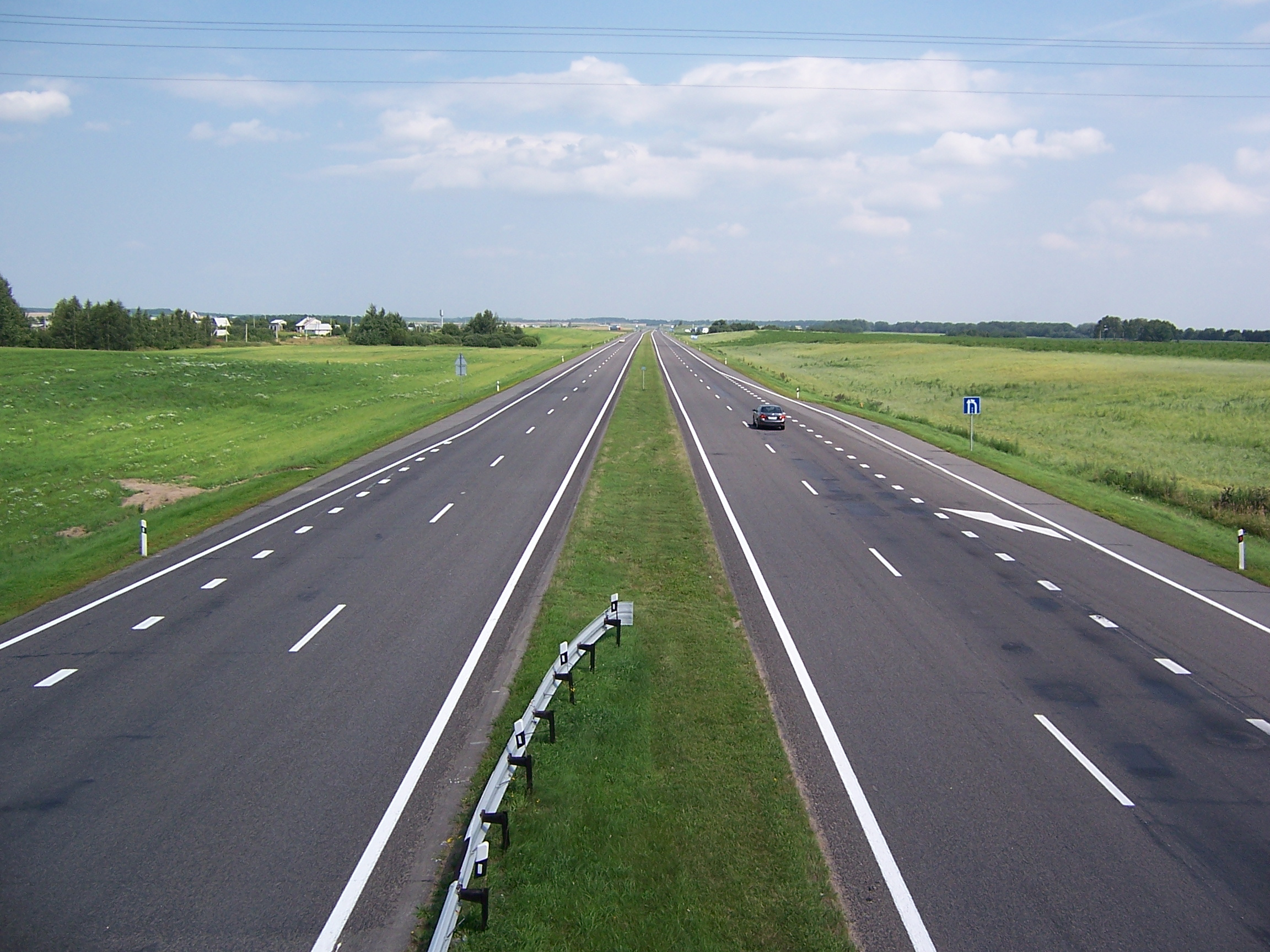
View to M1 road at the intersection with the road Pabiednaje — Fanipol near Minsk

The M1 (Belarusian: Магістраль М1, Russian: Магистраль M1), Magistral Route Nr. 1, olimpijka (Russian: олимпийка) is a main road crossing Belarus. It is a part of European route E30 and is the most important road in the country, connecting Moscow to Poland and Western Europe.

Running from east to west, the road runs from the Russian frontier via Orsha, Barysaw, Minsk, the capital, and Baranavichy to the Polish frontier at Brest. It follows the country's main transit axis, running parallel with the main Warsaw-Minsk-Moscow railway line. Between Orsha (0.5 km west of intersection with P87 road) and Kobryn (M10), a stretch of approximately 505 kilometres (314 mi), the M1 is signed as expressway.

| Distance (approx.) | Name | Other roads |
|---|---|---|
| | Poland | 68 E30 |
| 0 km | Kazlovichy (border crossing) | |
| 9 km | Brest | P 83 |
| 21 km | Brest | |
| 35 km | Zhabinka | P 7 |
| 56 km | Kobryn | M 12 E85 |
| 65 km | Kobryn | M 10 |
| 81 km | | P 81 |
| 114 km | Byaroza | P 84 |
| 150 km | Ivatsevichy | P 6 |
| 176 km | | P 43 P 2 E85 |
| 202 km | | P 2 E85 |
| 213 km | Baranavichy | P 108 |
| 222 km | Baranavichy | P 5 |
| 262 km | Haradzyeya, Nyasvizh | P 11 |
| 271 km | Stowbtsy | P 64 |
| 282 km | Stowbtsy | P 54 |
| 293 km | Stowbtsy | P 2 E85 |
| 322 km | Dzyarzhynsk | P 1 P 65 |
| 346 km | Minsk | P 23 |
| 366 km | Minsk | M 4 M 5 E271 |
| 387 km | Minsk, Minsk International Airport | M 2 |
| 397 km | Smalyavichy | P 69 |
| 399 km | Smalyavichy | P 59 |
| 420 km | Zhodzina | |
| 437 km | Barysaw | P 67 |
| 449 km | Barysaw | P 53 |
| 469 km | Krupki | P 19 |
| 492 km | Krupki | P 62 |
| 521 km | Talachyn | P 26 |
| 535 km | Talachyn | P 19 |
| 557 km | Orsha | P 15 |
| 574 km | Orsha | M 8 E95 P 87 |
| 588 km | Dubrowna | P 22 |
| 611 km | Redźki (border crossing) | |
| | Russia | M 1 / E30 / AH6 |
