= Barda–Aghdam highway =

Road in Azerbaijan

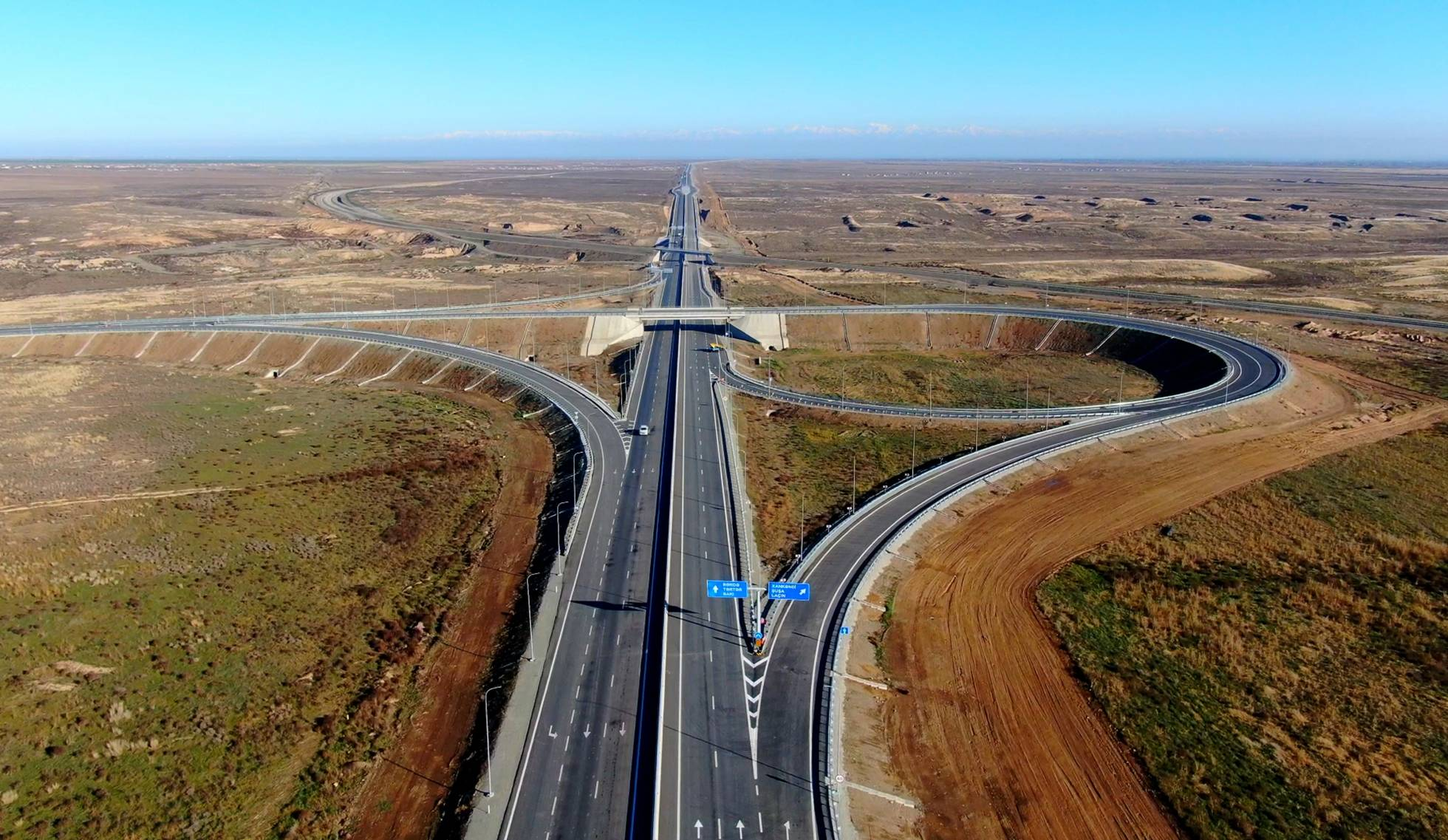

Route information
- Length: 44.5 km (27.7 mi)
- Existed: 24 December 2023–present

Major junctions
- West end: Barda
- East end: Aghdam

Location
- Country: Azerbaijan

Highway system
- Roads in Azerbaijan

The Barda–Aghdam highway (Azerbaijani: Bərdə–Ağdam avtomobil yolu) is a four-lane, first technical category highway in Azerbaijan, linking the city of Barda with Aghdam in the Karabakh Economic Region.

== History ==
The foundation ceremony of the road was held on 28 May 2021 with the participation of the president of Azerbaijan, Ilham Aliyev.

By October 2022, earthworks had been completed and approximately 75% of total construction work had been carried out. The project included the construction of four bridges, three grade-separated pedestrian crossings, and 29 bus stops, 14 of which had already been completed by that time.

The highway was commissioned on 24 December 2023.

== Characteristics ==
The highway starts in Barda and extends for 44.5 kilometres. It has four traffic lanes and was constructed in accordance with first technical-category standards. The total road width is 26.5 metres.

Bridges with lengths of 91.3 metres and 18.2 metres were built at the 25th and 40th kilometres, respectively. Grade-separated interchanges measuring 66 metres and 43 metres were constructed at the 14th and 42nd kilometres. In addition, overhead pedestrian crossings were installed at the 4th, 14th, and 16th kilometres.

The highway was built by the Azerbaijan Automobile Roads State Agency. Road markings, traffic signs, distance indicators, and information boards have been installed along the route.

The initial 14 kilometres of the road pass through Barda and several nearby settlements. The highway serves more than 20 settlements across the Barda and Aghdam districts, providing access to the city of Aghdam.
