= Geography of toll roads =

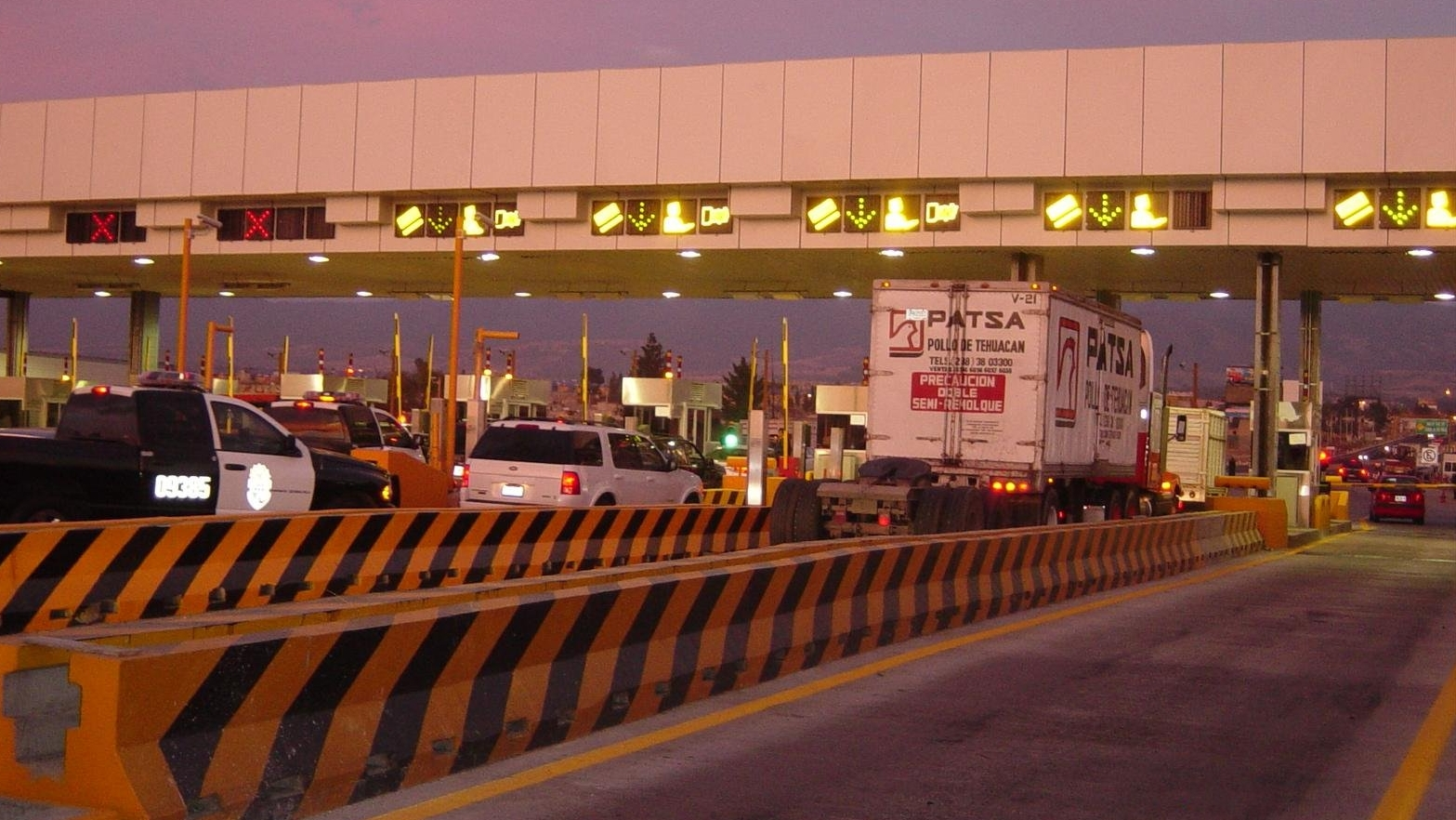
Toll gate San Marcos, at the México-Puebla highway.

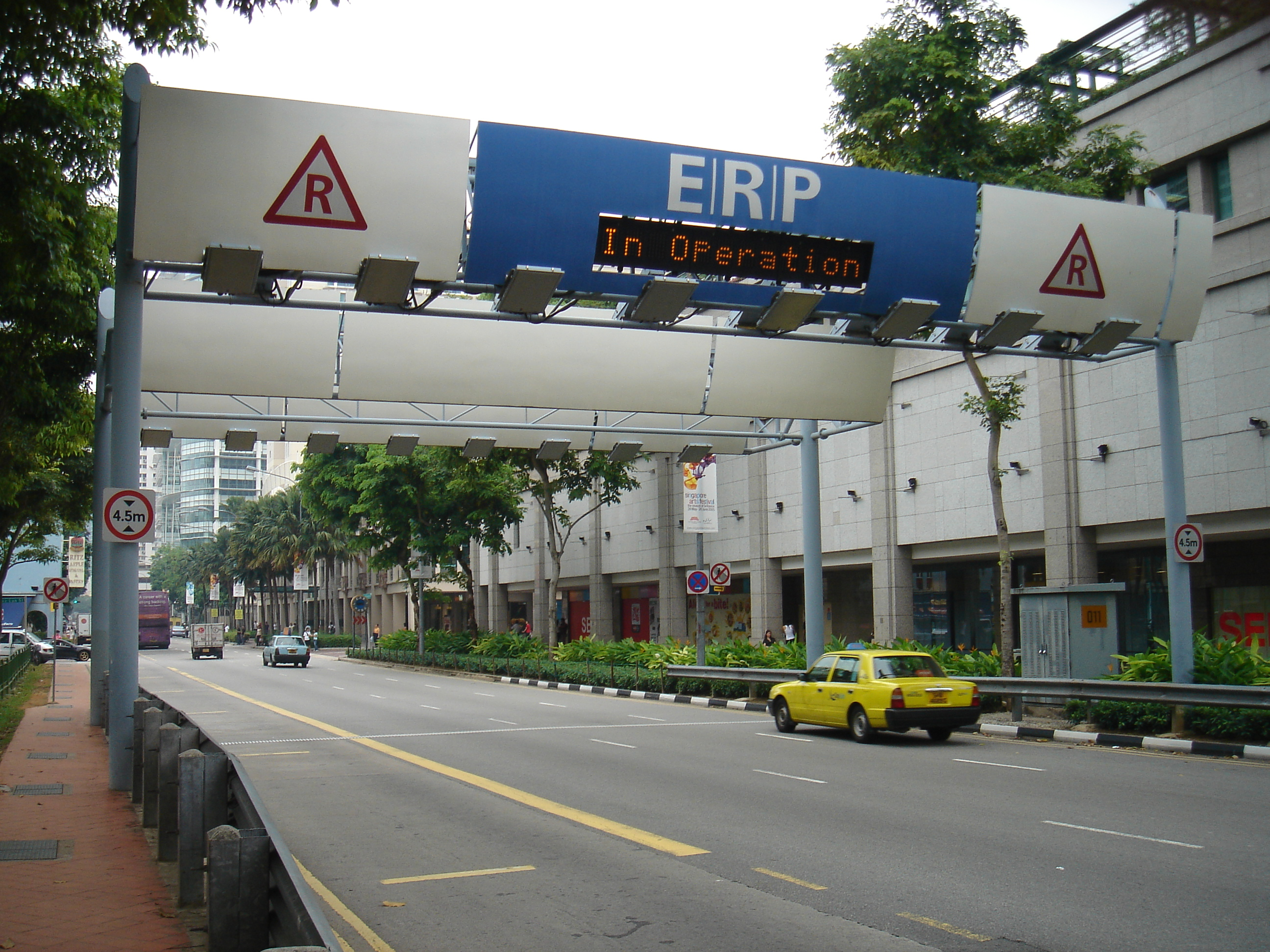
ERP gantry at North Bridge Road. Singapore

== Asia ==
=== Azerbaijan ===
- Baku - Guba - Samur (Azerbaijan–Russia border)

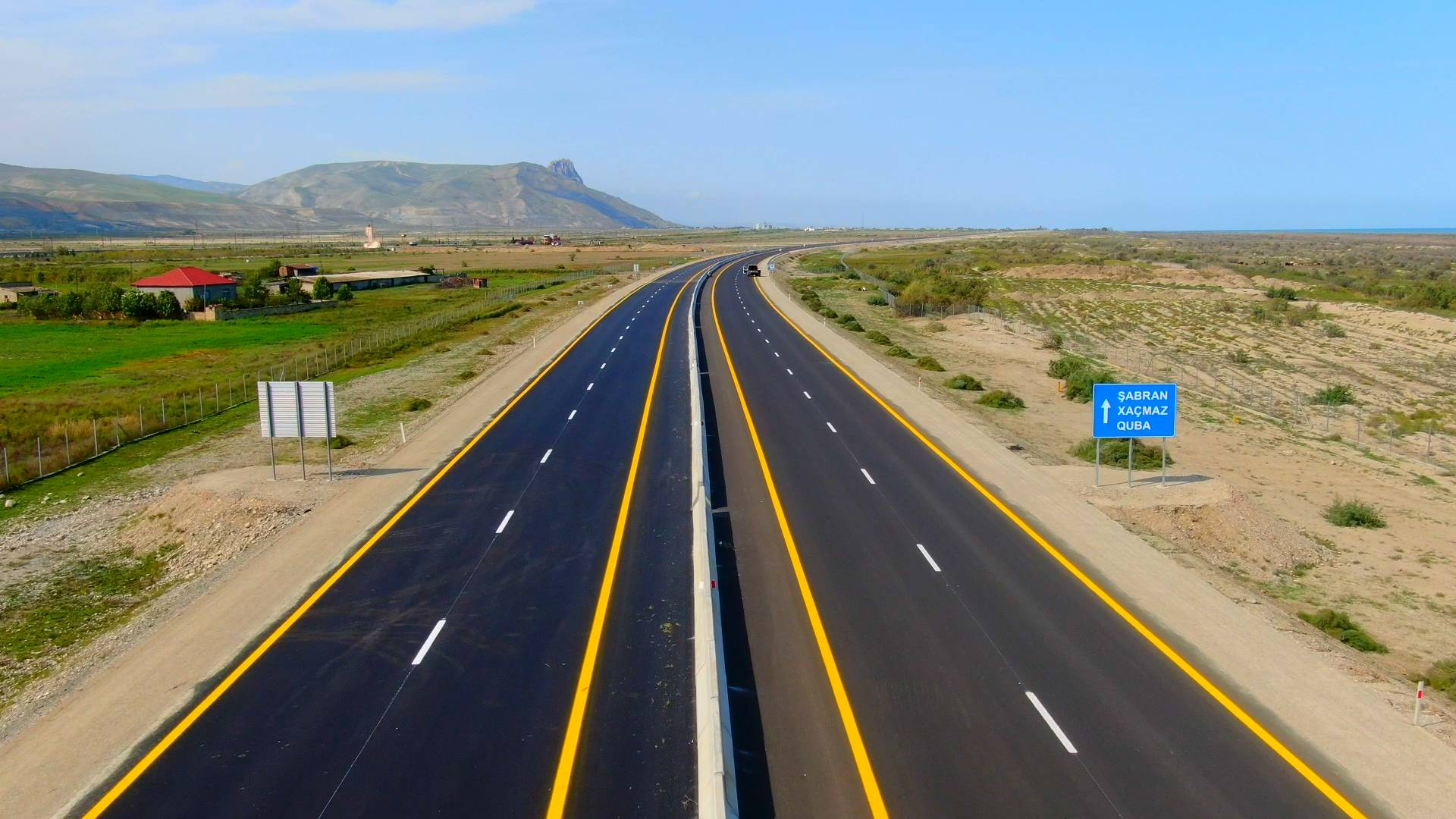
Baku-Guba-Samur(Azerbaijan-Russia border) Toll Road

This 150 km (93 mi) toll road serves as an alternative to the existing Baku-Guba-Samur border road which is 13 km (8.1 mi) longer.

- Ahmadbeyli–Fuzuli–Shusha highway: In April 2026, an 81.3 km section of this road, serving the recently developed Karabakh region, was designated as a toll road.

=== Bangladesh ===
Bangladesh has five toll bridges and four toll roads. None of them are of an electronic collection system. In Bangladesh, roads and bridges are built by the government. After building the roads and bridge, the government invites tender to give an operation and management (O&M) contract for five years against a fee. The O&M operators maintains the bridge and collects toll on behalf of the government. The toll tariff of Bangabandhu Multipurpose Bridge (formerly known as Jamuna Bridge), length 4.8 km (3.0 mi), the longest bridge of the country is considered very high compared with other bridges. Mr. Md. Mobarak Hossain, the CEO of Marga Net One Limited (Joint Venture by Pt. Jasa Marga (Persaro) Indonesia) and Net One Solutions Ltd, Bangladesh, who was also the CEO of the second O&M Operator of Bangabandhu (Jamuna) Bridge, feels that ৳400 (US$6.00) per private car is too high, while the trucks and lorries pays a maximum of US$18.00 for a single trip. The Bangabandhu Bridge is a vital link connecting the eastern part of the country with its northern part.

=== China ===
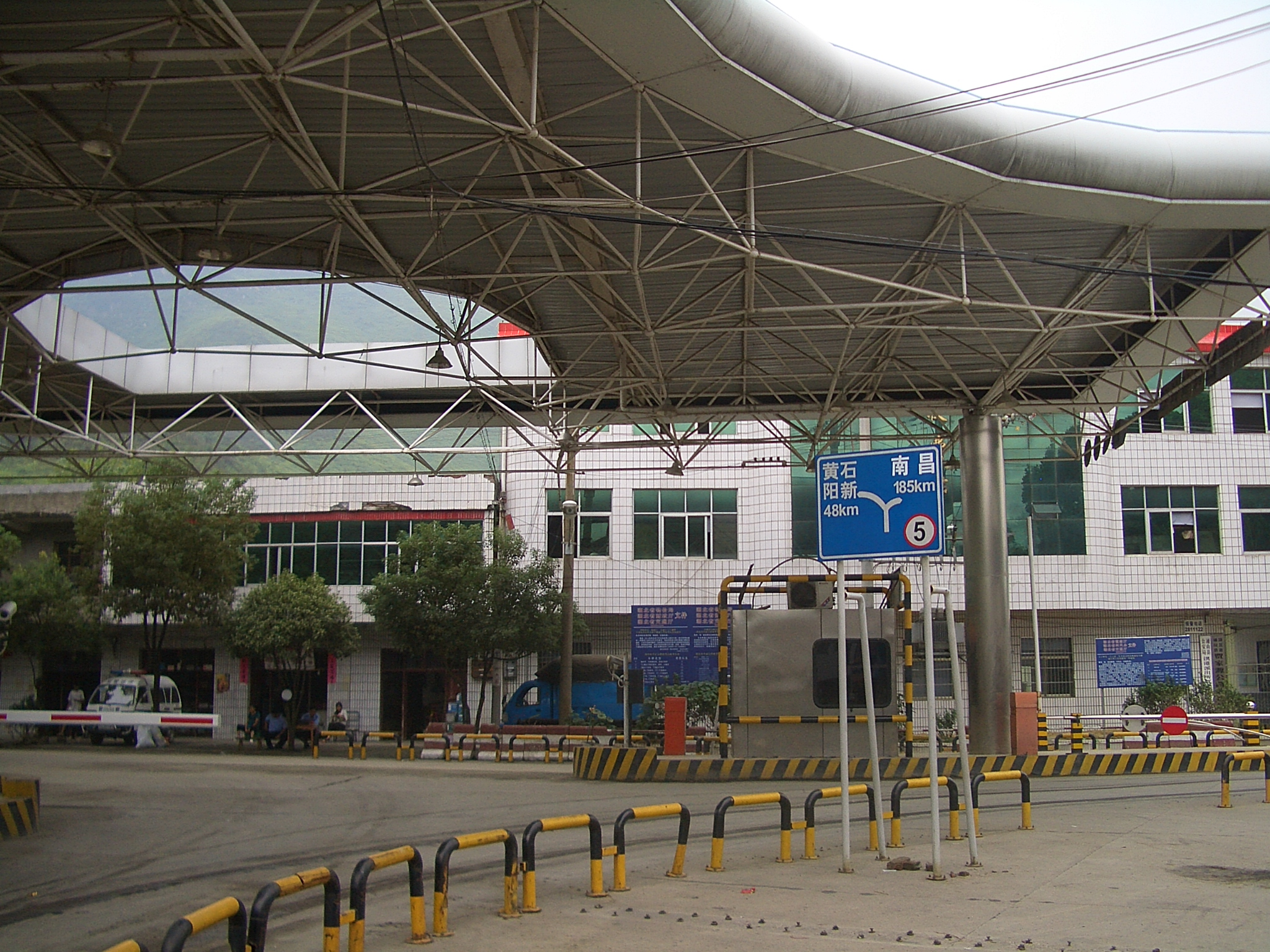
Toll plaza at the junction of National Highways G106 and G316 in Tongshan County, Hubei

Nearly all Chinese expressways and express routes charge tolls, although they are not often networked from one toll expressway to another. However, beginning with the Jingshen Expressway, tolls are gradually being networked. Given the size of the nation, however, the task is rather difficult.

China National Highways, which are not expressways, but "grade-A" routes, also charge tolls. Some provincial, autonomous-regional and municipal routes, as well as some major bridges, will also charge passage fees. In November 2004, legislation in China provided for a minimum length of a stretch of road or expressway in order for tolls to be charged.

=== Hong Kong ===
In Hong Kong, most tunnels and some bridges that form part of the motorway networks are tolled to cover construction and maintenance costs. Some built recently are managed in the Build-Operate-Transfer (BOT) basis. The companies which build the tunnels or bridges are given franchise of a certain length of time (usually 30 years) to operate. Ownership will be transferred to the government when the franchise expires. An example is the Cross-Harbour Tunnel.

=== India ===
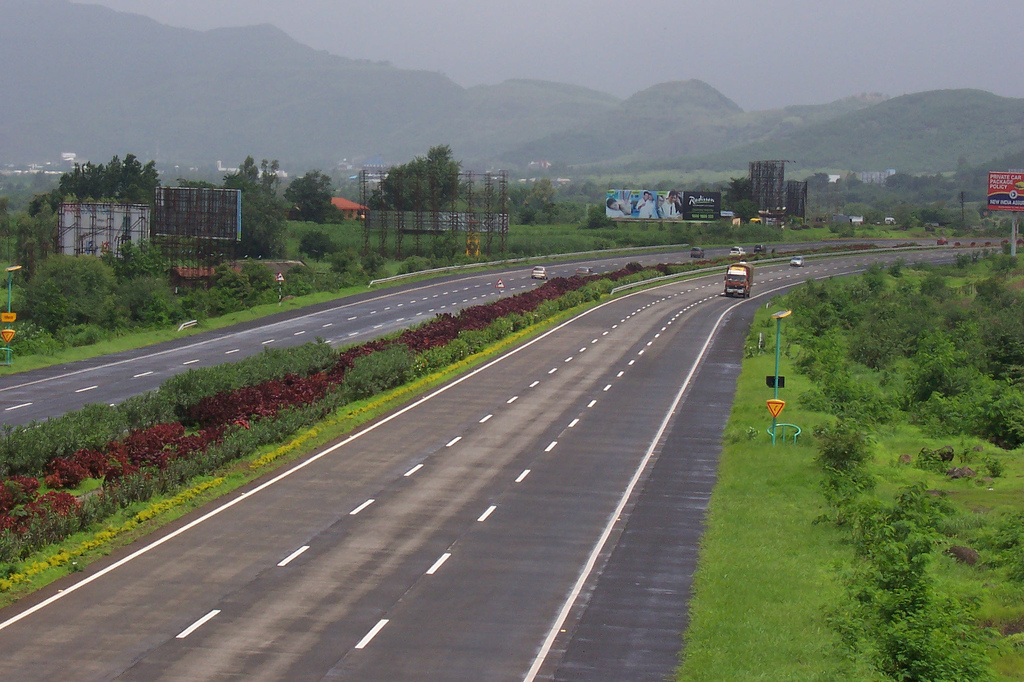
Mumbai-Pune Expressway, India

Access-controlled roads in India are tolled. In addition to cash tolls, toll plazas have dedicated electronic toll collection lanes for quicker operation.

In addition, most of the upgraded sections of the National Highway network are also tolled. These tolls are lower than those on expressways.

Currently, a massive project is underway to expand the highway network and the Government of India plans to add an additional 18,637 km (11,580 mi) of expressways to the network by the year 2022.

=== Indonesia ===
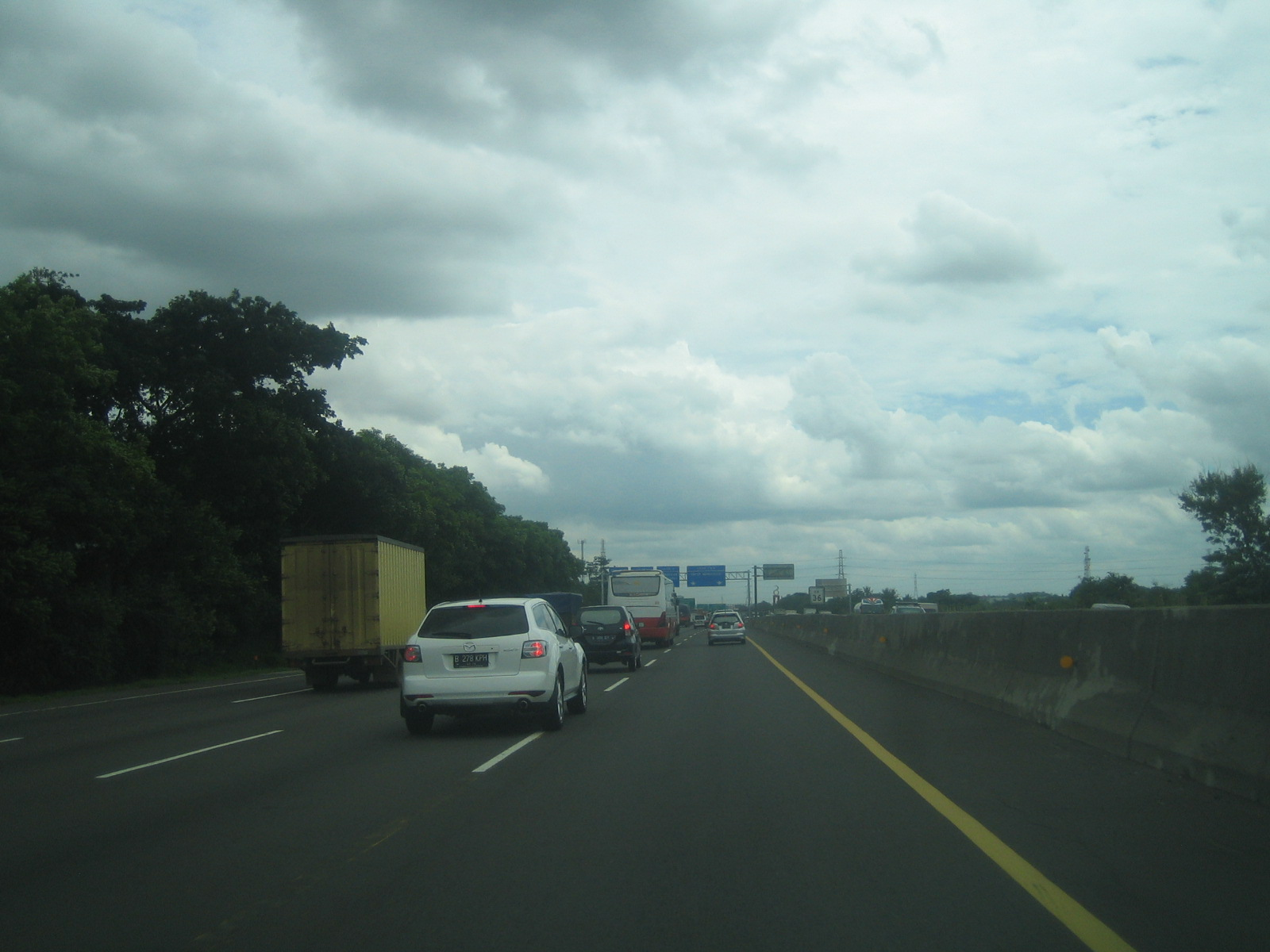
KM 36 of Jakarta–Cikampek Toll Road.

Indonesia opened its first toll road, the Jagorawi Toll Road, in 1978. This linked the capital city of Jakarta to the neighboring cities of Bogor and Ciawi south of the capital. Since then, Indonesia has seen a dramatic increase on the operational length and reach of its toll road system, spanning 2,893.02 km (1,797.64 mi) by the end of June 2024, with most of it being built during the presidency of Joko Widodo.

Since October 2017, all toll booths in Indonesia only accepts electronic payments through payment cards.

=== Israel ===
Israeli toll road sign, showing the Israeli new sheqel symbol: ₪

Highway 6 in Israel, widely known as the Trans-Israel Highway or Cross-Israel Highway, is to date the only electronic toll highway in Israel. Currently Highway 6 is 110 km long, all of which is a freeway. This figure will grow in the next few years as additional segments, currently undergoing statutory approvals and permitting processes, are added to the main section of the road. Highway 6 uses a system of cameras and transponders to toll vehicles automatically. There are no toll booths, allowing Highway 6 to be designed as a normal freeway with interchanges.

=== Japan ===
The vast majority of Japan's extensive expressway consists of toll roads. Payment of the fare can either be made in cash as one exits or using the electronic toll collection card system. As of 2001, the toll fees for an ordinary passenger car was ¥24.60 per kilometre plus a ¥150 terminal charge.

=== Malaysia ===
Malaysia has extensive toll roads that forms the majority of country's expressways which in length spans more than 1,400 km (870 mi) ranging North to the Thai border, South to the Causeway and Second Link to Singapore, West to Klang and Pulau Indah and East towards Kuantan. Most of the toll roads are in major cities and conurbations such as Klang Valley, Johor Bahru and Penang. All of Malaysian toll roads are managed in the Build-Operate-Transfer basis as in Hong Kong and Japan (see below).

=== Pakistan ===
All motorways and few expressways are toll roads. First such motorway M2 was opened to public in 1997. Since then the M3, M9, M10, and M1, all toll roads, have become operational. The M8 is under construction. The M-8 is partially untolled (Hoshab to Gwadar segment untolled). Some National Highways have toll plazas at the entry of a district or city, for example Kala Shah Kaku toll plaza near to Kala Shah Kaku.

=== Philippines ===
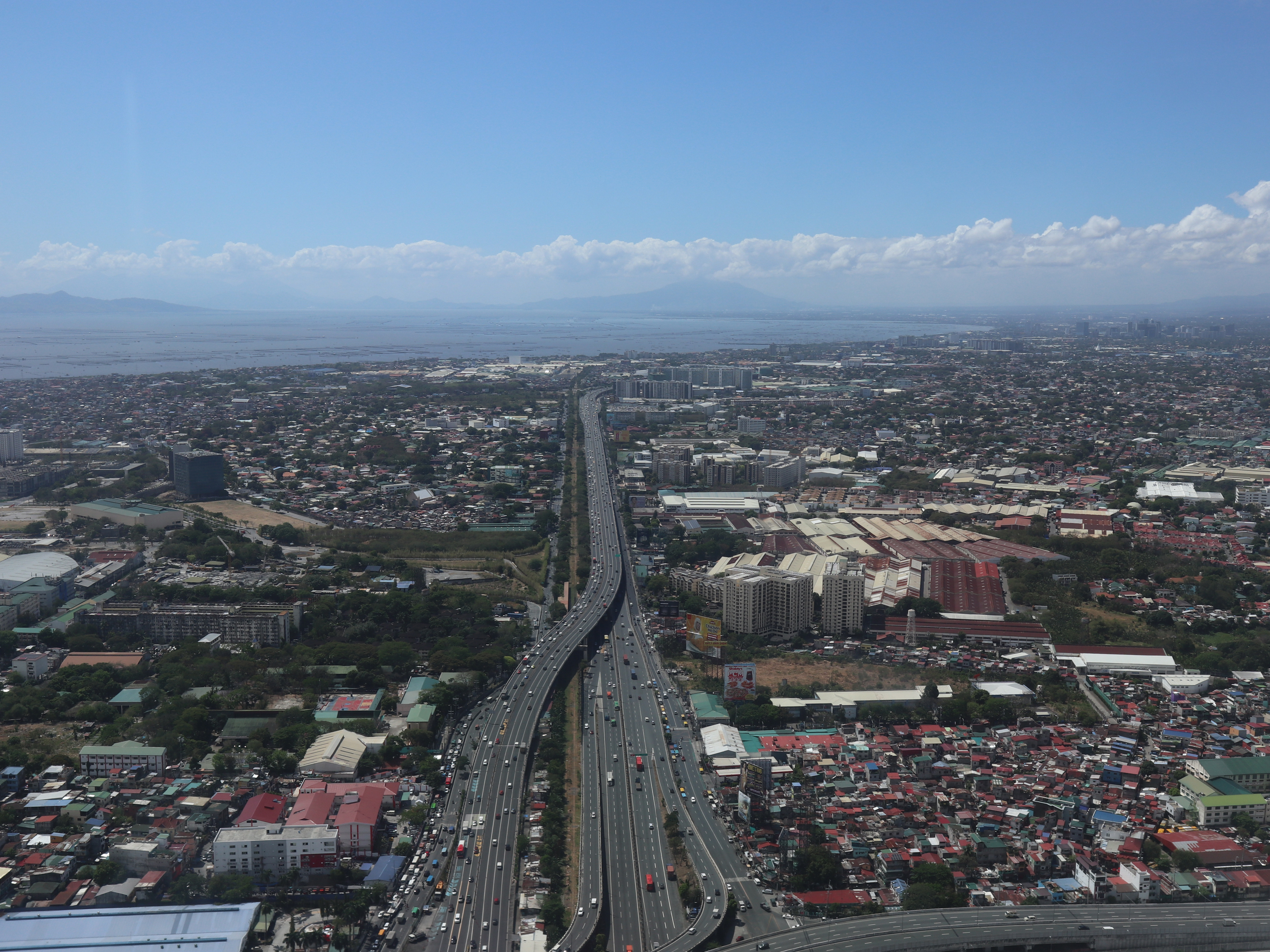
South Luzon Expressway and Metro Manila Skyway towards southern Metro Manila

Currently, the Philippines have toll roads, mostly on the island of Luzon and one in Visayas. The toll roads, mostly named after their locations, comprise a total length of 626 km (389 mi). The three major concessionaires of those toll roads are San Miguel Corporation, NLEX Corporation, and Prime Asset Ventures, Inc. The Toll Regulatory Board regulates all toll roads, while the Department of Public Works and Highways plays a crucial role in the planning, design, construction, and maintenance of infrastructure facilities, including expressways.

Electronic toll collections on all Philippine expressways are on a dry run since 2023, aiming for full implementation in 2024.

=== Singapore ===
In Singapore, toll stations are automated, thus reducing manpower. The automated toll stations, also known to the locals as ERP or Electronic Road Pricing, was introduced by Land Transport Authority (LTA) to reduce city traffic jams. The number of toll stations is increasing rapidly and some Singaporeans even call it "Every road pay".

=== Sri Lanka ===
Sri Lanka currently operates 2 toll roads. The Southern Expressway (E 01) and the Katunayake Expressway (E 03). The Kandy Colombo Expressway (E 02) is under planning at the moment (2013). The toll revenue is used to repair and maintain the expressways.

=== Taiwan ===
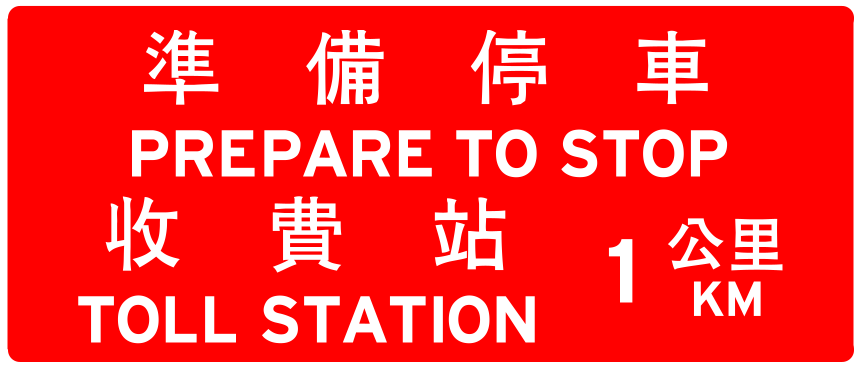
A typical toll booth notification sign in Taiwan

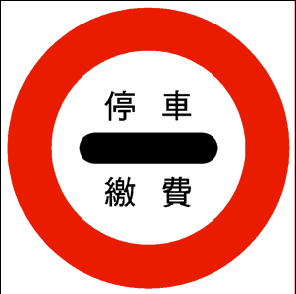
Taiwanese Toll Booth Sign off freeways meaning: stop the vehicle to pay toll

Freeways in Taiwan are not exactly toll roads in the sense that toll gates/stations are not located at the entrance and exits of the freeway. Toll stations with weigh stations are located every thirty to forty kilometres on the No. 1 and No. 3 National Freeways of the Republic of China. There are usually no freeway exits once a toll station notification sign appears, making it necessary for the driver to be familiar with the locations of the toll stations in advance.

Other toll roads in Taiwan are usually newly built bridges and tunnels. Tolls are frequently collected to pay off the construction cost and once paid off, the tolls may be repealed.

=== Tajikistan ===
Toll roads in Tajikistan are owned and operated by Innovative Road Solutions (IRS). The northern point is in the Sughd Viloyat and the Southern point ends at Kurgan Tyube (100 km (62 mi) south of the capital of the country, Dushanbe). While going from end to end costs roughly US$12 for regular 2 axle vehicles, it can top to US$100 for semitrucks. The IRS is setting up new toll plazas that are going to be able to read off the digital device attached to windshield while passing through at the speed of no more than 15 km/h (9.3 mph), similar to ones in the United States. This is the only toll road in the entire Central Asia with about 5 cars going through each toll plaza every minute in every direction. The more information can be found on their homepage at www.IRS.tj

=== Thailand ===
Most of the toll roads in Thailand are either within Greater Bangkok or originated from Bangkok. They are called expressways, tollways, and motorways. Two government agencies under the Ministry of Transport, namely the Expressway Authority of Thailand (EXAT) and the Department of Highways (DoH), own networks of toll roads. Some are operated by the agencies themselves; others are operated by private concessionaires. EXAT is in charge of Chaloem Mahanakhon Expressway, Si Rat Expressway, Chalong Rat Expressway, Udon Ratthaya Expressway, Burapha Withi Expressway and Kanchanphisek Outer Ring Road (southern section). DoH is in charge of Uttraphimuk Tollway (formerly Don Mueang Tollway), Motorway No. 7 (Bangkok-Chonburi), and Motorway No. 9 (Kanchanphisek Outer Ring Road - eastern section). Both agencies have plans to build more toll roads in the future, expanding their networks to the provinces.

Electronic Toll Collection using passive RFID tags is used in Chaloem Mahanakhon, Si Rat, Chalong Rat, and Burapha Withi Expressway while Uttraphimuk Tollway employs passive IC-card-based Touch-and-Go system. There are plans to upgrade and expand ETC systems in the near future.

=== United Arab Emirates ===
The toll system Salik started in Dubai in July 2007.

== Africa ==
=== Morocco ===
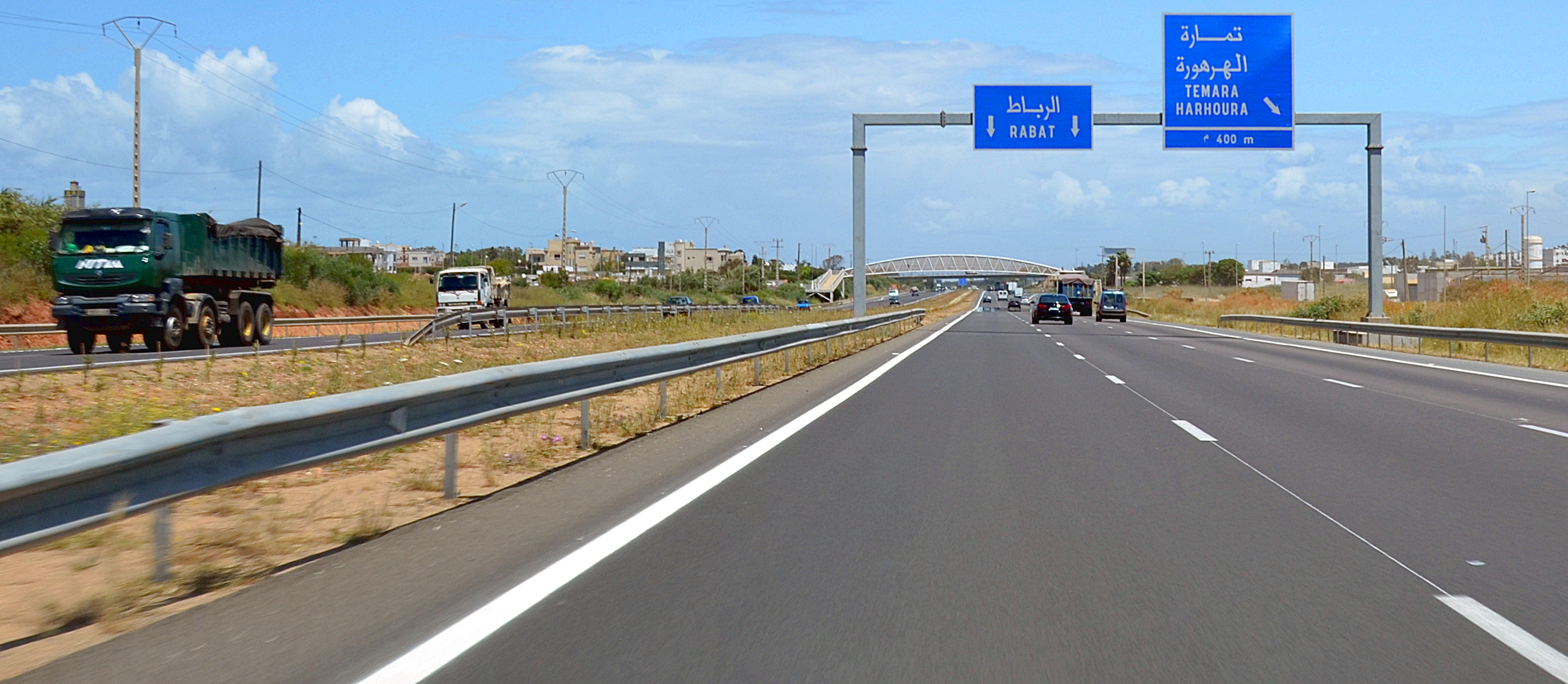
Casablanca–Rabat expressway

Morocco has an extensive system of toll roads or Autoroutes. These were for the most part recently built, and from Casablanca connect all of Moroccos major cities such as Marrakesh, Rabat, and Tangier. Operator Autoroutes Du Maroc runs the network on a pay-per-use basis, with toll stations placed along its length. Goal is completing a north–south and an east–west link crossing the country. Both axis will be important sections of the Pan-African main links.

=== South Africa ===
In South Africa, some of the National routes have sections that are toll roads (with physical tollgates), namely the N1, N2, N3, N4 & N17. All toll roads are run by the South African National Roads Agency Limited (SANRAL), with the exception of a few roads. The section of the N4 west of Pretoria is managed by Bakwena, under license from SANRAL while the section of the N4 east of Pretoria is managed by Trans-Africa Concessions, under license from SANRAL. The section of the N3 between Cedara and Heidelberg is run by the N3 Toll Concession, under license from SANRAL.

=== Zimbabwe ===
In 2013, the Ntabazinduna Toll Plaza was opened outside of Bulawayo on the A5 Road to Harare and the toll system was introduced by a South African Group named Group Five as part of a government project to provide safer highways and to also benefit the local community and also the local economy.

=== Zambia ===
In Zambia, every Inter-Territorial Road (designated with the letter T; except for T6), together with many Territorial Roads (designated with the letter M) and very few District Roads (designated with the letter D) are toll roads with tollgates. The tollgates are run by the National Road Fund Agency (NRFA) and the Road Development Agency (RDA).

== Europe ==
Toll roads in Europe have a long history. The first turnpike road in England was authorised in the seventeenth century. The term turnpike refers to a gate on which sharp pikes would be fixed as a defence against cavalry. Early references include the (mythical) Greek ferryman Charon charging a toll to ferry (dead) people across the river Acheron. Germanic tribes charged tolls to travellers across mountain passes. Tolls were used in the Holy Roman Empire in the 14th century and 15th century.

In some European countries payment of road tolls is made using stickers which are affixed to the windscreen. Germany uses a system based on satellite technology for large vehicles. In other countries payment may be made in cash, by credit card, by pre-paid card or by an electronic toll collection system. Tolls may vary according to the distance travelled, the building and maintenance costs of the motorway and the type of vehicle.

Some of these toll roads are privately owned and operated. Others are owned by the government. Some of the government-owned toll roads are privately operated.

=== Belarus ===
Major highways in Belarus are toll roads with Open road tolling (ORT) or free-flow tolling. BelToll is an electronic toll collection system (ETC), valid from 1 July 2013 in the Republic of Belarus.

=== Croatia ===
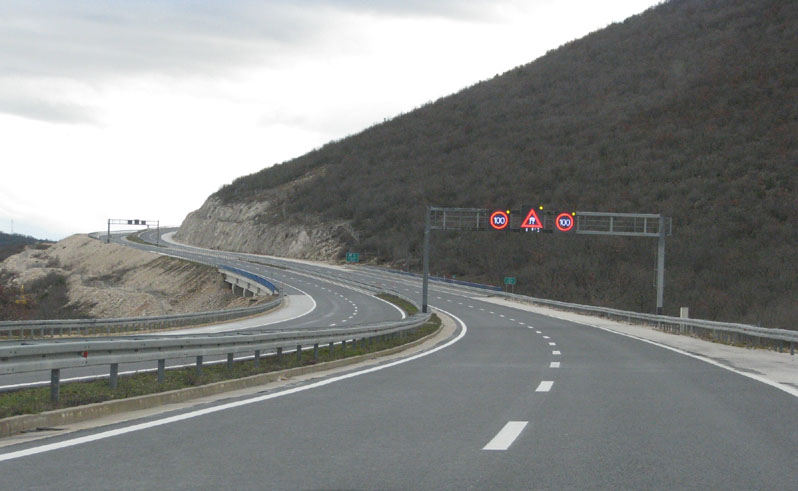
A1 motorway near Trogir.

Almost all Croatian highways are toll roads with the exception of the Zagreb bypass and Rijeka bypass.

There are five vehicle categories in Croatia that differ in weight, height, number of axles and trailer attachment. The toll for the use of a motorway on which a closed or open toll system has been introduced is calculated and charged according to the distance between the two toll points the vehicle passes, the group of vehicles to which the vehicle is deployed and the unit price per kilometer. The unit price per kilometer of motorway, i.e. individual sections of motorway, is determined according to construction costs, maintenance costs, management costs and costs of development of motorways and toll road facilities. The unit price per kilometer can be determined differently for each section of the motorway.

Toll payment is possible in six ways:

- Cash payment: Croatian kunas and Euros
- Card payment: Visa, Mastercard, Maestro, Diners Card, American Express, INA card, MOL card
- Subscription cards (smart): AZM smart card
- Unique smart card for all motorways in the Republic of Croatia for people with disabilities entitled to free tolls
- ENC - Electronic toll collection: HAC, Bina Istra
- Toll surcharge via SMS and via WEB portal

There are three Croatian companies that build and maintain highways and collect tolls:

- Hrvatske autoceste (Croatian Motorways Ltd)
- Autocesta Zagreb - Macelj (Zagreb - Macelj Motorway)
- BINA Istra

=== Denmark ===
The Great Belt Fixed Link the Øresund Bridge are toll roads.

In the Faroe Islands, the inter-island road tunnels Vágatunnilin, Norðoyatunnilin, Eysturoyartunnilin and Sandoyartunnilin have tolls (but no physical toll booths are present and the toll must be paid at nearby petrol stations).

=== France ===
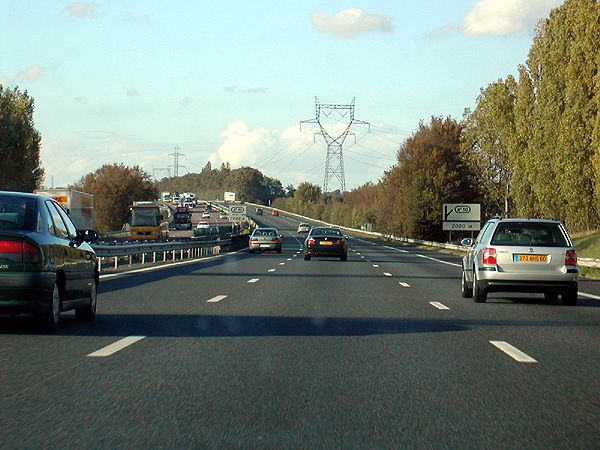
A typical French autoroute.

In Europe, the most substantial use of toll roads is in France, where most of the autoroutes carry quite heavy tolls.

=== Iceland ===
The Hvalfjörður Tunnel was tolled from 11 July 1998 but became toll free as of 28 September 2018. Currently the Vaðlaheiðargöng tunnel, opened in December 2018, is the only toll road in Iceland.

=== Ireland ===
Ireland has three toll roads, three toll bridges, and two toll tunnels, which are operated by various independent operators. Most were built under a public-private partnership system, giving the company which arranged for the road to be built the right to collect tolls for a defined period. Tolls vary from €1.65 to €12 for cars.

=== Italy ===
Most Italian motorways are toll roads, with some exceptions such as some motorways in Southern Italy and Sicily or the Grande Raccordo Anulare (Rome's ring road).

In most motorways, toll is proportional to the distance traveled and has to be paid on exit, where toll gates — (in Italian) caselli — are placed. On other motorways, however, toll gates are placed directly along the route — (in Italian) barriere —. In such cases, it is required to pay a fixed amount, regardless of the distance traveled. A8, A9, A52 are good examples of that system.

Toll can be paid in cash, by credit card, by pre-paid card, or by Telepass.

61% of the Italian motorways are handled by the "Autostrade per l'Italia S.p.A." company, and its subsidiaries. All of these carriers are now privately owned and supervised by ANAS. The network of motorways covers most of Italy: northern and central Italy are well covered, the south and Sicily are scarcely covered, Sardinia is not covered at all.

The motorway operators are required to build, operate and maintain their networks at cost and to cover their expenses from the toll they collect. The tolls vary according to the building and maintenance costs of the motorway and the type of vehicle.

Besides the motorways, only some alpine tunnels (such as the Mont Blanc Tunnel) are tolled. Today, no toll is required on other roads, including motorway-like dual carriageways — (in Italian) superstrade. The first tolled superstrada is under construction now north of Venice.

=== The Netherlands ===
In the beginning of the 20th century, almost all communities collected toll on all passing traffic, usually including pedestrians and livestock. In 1953, the central government abolished all communal tolls.

As of 2008, there are three effective toll roads in Netherlands. They are for the Western Scheldt Tunnel, Kil tunnel, both major arteries, and the "Tolbrug" (Toll Bridge) in Nieuwerbrug, a local hand-drawn bridge. Also, for the Wijkertunnel, a "shadow toll" is paid by Rijkswaterstaat for each passed vehicle.

=== Norway ===
Norwegian toll road sign

Norway has extensively been using toll as a way to finance road infrastructure in the last decades.

There are also toll rings around some cities, where drivers have to pay to enter or leave the city, regardless of if the road is new or old. The first city was Bergen in 1986. The money goes to construction of infrastructure in and around the city.

=== Poland ===
Toll plazas in Poland

There are three toll highways in Poland, connecting the major cities and the nation's boundaries. Two routes travel east–west, one running between Łódź and the German border, the other currently connecting Katowice and Kraków, with current construction extending the roads to the German and Ukrainian boundaries. A north–south route connects Rybnik to Katowice, and Toruń to Gdańsk.

=== Portugal ===
In Portugal a certain number of roads are designated Toll-Roads. They charge a fixed value per kilometre distance, with several classes depending on vehicle type and regulated by the government. Several authorised franchises run them, the largest at present being BRISA. For cash-free payments there exists the Via Verde, an electronic toll collection system. On leaving the motorway, charges are automatically debited from a bank account.

=== Russia ===
A number of toll roads in Barnaul and Pskov Region (Nevil-Velezh (190 ₽ ($8)), Pechori-state border RUR 140), also M4-Don (18 km (11 mi) close to Lipetsk costs 20 ₽ ($0.75) for cars and 40 ₽ ($1.70) for trucks).

Overall toll network is 383 kilometres (238 mi) or 0.05% of total road network. Average price in Pskov region having 226 km (140 mi) of toll roads is 2.4 ₽ to 5.5 ₽ per km for cars and 7.9 ₽ to 19.5 ₽ for trucks. This comes close to $0.50 per km for trucks.

Ordinary speed limits apply so far. In 2007 adopted Toll Road Law and Concession Law in 2005 to develop this sector.

=== Slovenia ===
For the use of 464.7 km (288.8 mi) of the Slovenian freeways and expressways use of toll stickers is obligatory for all vehicles with the permissible maximum weight of 3.5 tonnes (3.9 tons) on motorways and expressways as of 1 July 2008. The sticker costs are €15 for 7 days, €30 for a month and €95 for a year. Motorcyclists have to pay €7.50 for 7 days, €25 for a half year and €47.50 for a year. Trucks use existing toll road stops. Use of highways and expressways without a valid and properly displayed sticker in a vehicle is a violation of the law and is punished with a fine of €300 or more.

Due to the high costs of toll stickers for transit drivers going to vacation to Croatian and Montenegrin coast and others only passing through Slovenia, the highways are avoided by some travellers. Brussels had opened the case with the statement that the Slovenian vignette violates prevailing EU rights and discriminates road users. The European commissioner for traffic and transport, Antonio Tajani, had investigated in the case of discrimination. On 28 January 2010, after short-term vignettas were introduced by Slovenia and some other changes were made to the Slovenian vignette system, the European Commission concluded that the vignette system is in accordance with the European law.

=== Spain ===
Most Spanish toll roads are networked, so you must get a ticket on entering and pay when leaving the road. Technically, all roads belong to the Government, although toll roads are built and maintained by private companies under a State concession; when the concession expires, the road is reverted to State ownership, however most of then are renewed. Toll roads are called in Spanish autopistas. Freeways, often comparable to autopistas in building and ride quality, are called autovías.

There are some autovías which are actually built and maintained by private companies, such as Pamplona-Logroño A-12 or Madrid access road M45. The company assumes the building costs and the Autonomous Community where they are located (in the given examples, Navarre and Madrid) pays a yearly per-vehicle fee to the company based upon usage statistics, called "shadow toll" (in Spanish, peaje en la sombra). The system can be regarded as a way for the Government to finance the build of new roads at the expense of the building company. Also, since the payment starts only after the road is finished, construction delays are usually shorter than those of regular state-owned freeways. However, those cannot be classified as toll roads since drivers do not need to pay any fees.

=== Sweden ===
Swedish toll road sign

The border-crossing Oresund Bridge has around €50 toll. Two other bridges, including Sundsvall Bridge (and until 2021 also the Svinesund Bridge) have tolls of smaller amounts. The Stockholm and Gothenburg City areas have congestion pricing on entry or exit. Before the year 2000 road tolls did not exist in Sweden for several decades.

=== Switzerland ===
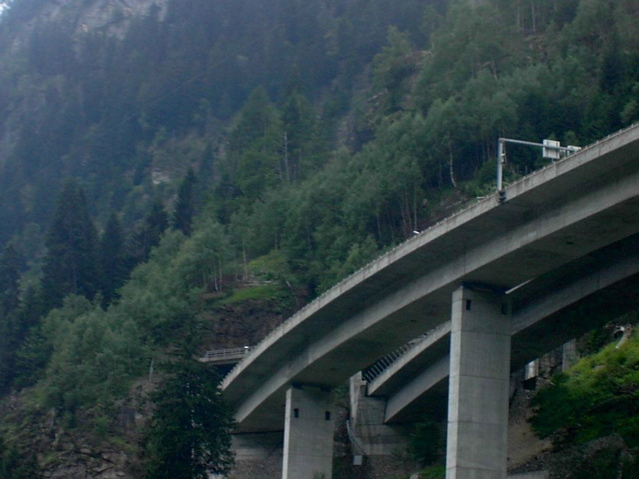
The A2 motorway in Ticino, suspended over viaducts

For the use of Swiss motorways the use of toll stickers is obligatory. They costs CHF 40 per year per vehicle (a car towing a trailer needs two stickers). There are no stickers for shorter periods and they are valid 14 months (the 2010 sticker is valid from 1 December 2009 until 31 January 2011). However, this also means that a sticker bought any time during the year can only be used for less than the maximum period until 31 January of the following year.

=== Republic of Turkey ===
In the Republic of Turkey toll is collected on certain highways, the so-called Otoyol or Karayolu. This is done so by three different systems. Every toll road has lanes for all three payment methods. One method is KGS (Kartlı Geçiş Sistemi) (English: Card passage system) which requires a Prepaid card to be presented at the toll port. Every passing will be withdrawn from the card. Another method is HGS (Hızlı Geçiş Sistemi) (English: Fast passage system.) which uses a RFID chip stuck to the windshield of the vehicle. This chip is scanned automatically when passing the toll collecting point and money will be automatically withdrawn from the connected bank account. The last system is OGS which is calles Otomatik Geçiş Sistemi in Turkish, and translates Automatic passage system in English. This form of payment requires a fixed amount of money to be paid for a monthly or annual subscription. When subscribed, your car will be equipped with a barcoded sticker, which will be checked by CCTV cameras automatically to check if the car is actually subscribed. The Turkish toll system can't be avoided (except for avoiding toll roads), because one can simply not pass KGS without the required card, and due to the cameras, all cars passing OGS and HGS with no or expired or counterfied chips or stickers will get a fine nicely presented at their home address.

=== United Kingdom ===
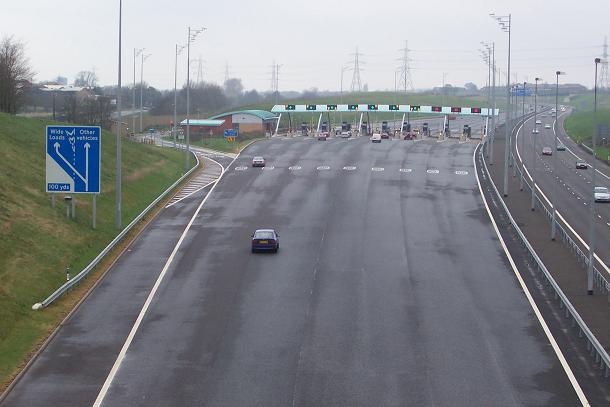
M6 Toll plaza for northbound traffic at Great Wyrley

Road rates were introduced in England in the seventeenth century. The first turnpike road, whereby travellers paid tolls to be used for road upkeep, was authorised in 1663 for a section of the Great North Road in Hertfordshire. The first turnpike trust was established by Parliament through a Turnpike Act in 1706. From 1751 until 1772, there was a flurry of interest in turnpike trusts and a further 390 were established. By 1825, over 1,000 trusts controlled 25,000 miles (40,000 km) of road in England and Wales.

The rise of railway transport largely halted the improving schemes of the turnpike trusts. Unable to earn sufficient revenue from tolls alone the trusts took to requiring taxes from the local parishes. The system was never properly reformed but from the 1870s Parliament stopped renewing the acts and roads began to revert to local authorities, the last trust vanishing in 1895. The Local Government Act 1888 created county councils and gave them responsibility for maintaining the major roads. There are still a small number of toll bridges left including Swinford toll bridge near Oxford.

Most UK roads today are maintained from general taxation, some of which is raised from motoring taxes including fuel duty and vehicle excise duty. Today, there are few tolls on roads in the United Kingdom - mainly toll bridges and tunnels. Until recently there were only two toll roads to which there is a public right of way (Rye Road in Stanstead Abbotts and College Road in Dulwich) together with another five or so private toll-roads. The M6 Toll motorway to the north of Birmingham levies a usage charge.

== North and South America ==
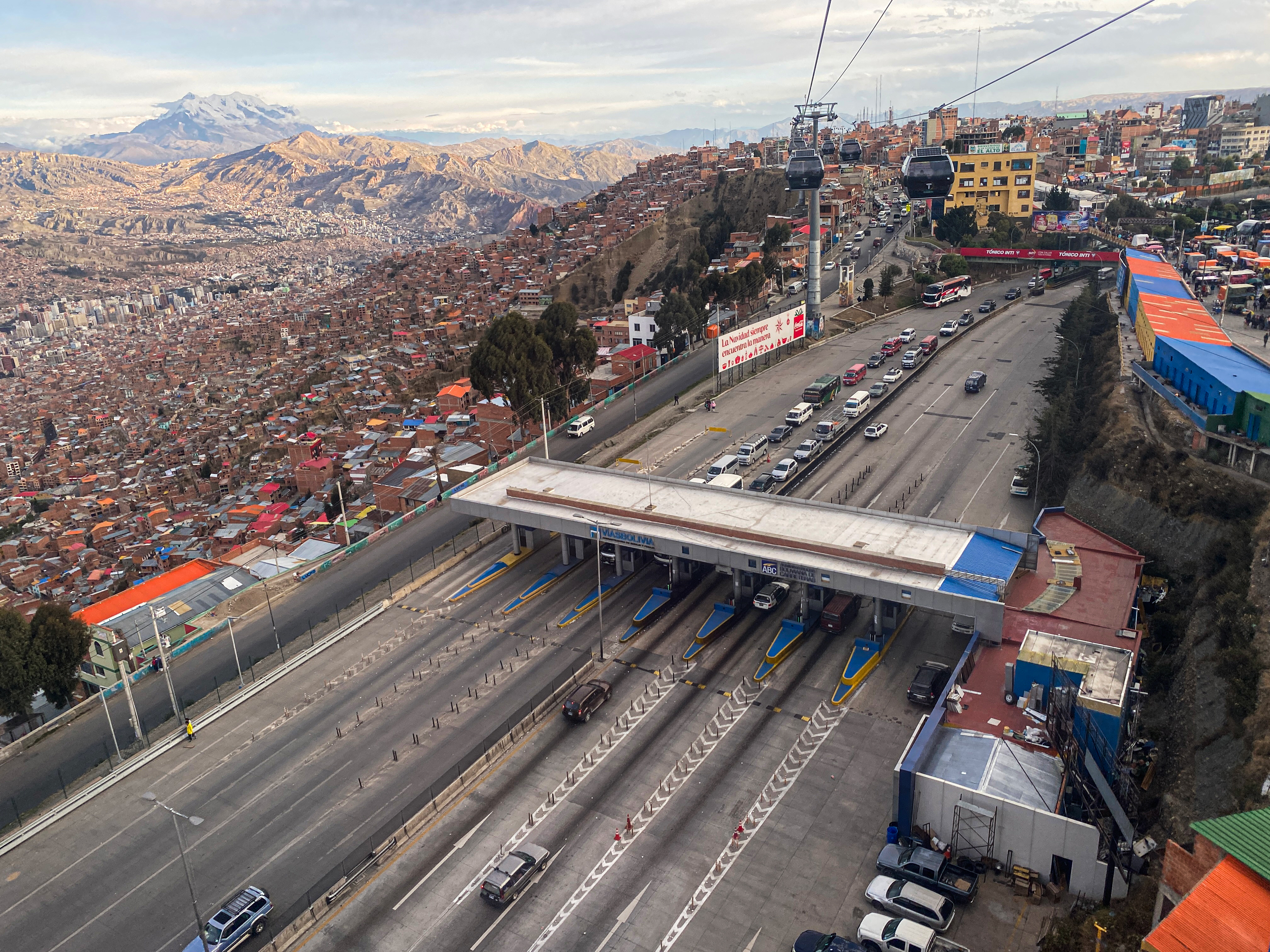
The toll plaza of the La Paz-El Alto Expressway, connecting the two major Bolivian cities

=== Bolivia ===
In November 2006, the Ministry of Public Works, Services and Housing of Bolivia created Vías Bolivia, a public entity with the purpose of pricing, managing and maintaining the toll roads across the country. As of 2021, there are currently 141 operating toll roads in Bolivia as well as 13 weigh stations for commercial vehicles and trucks.

=== Brazil ===
In Brazil, toll roads are a recent institution, and were adopted mostly in non-federal highways. The state of São Paulo has the highest length of toll roads, which are exploited either by private companies which bought a concession from the state, or by a state owned company (see Highway system of São Paulo). In São Paulo there is also a statewide electronic collection system using a plastic transponder (e-tag) attached to the windscreen, named SemParar'. There is a growing trend towards tolling in all major highways of the country, but some resistance by the population is beginning to be felt, particularly due to some abuses which are being imposed, restricting the constitutional rights of coming and going (because the Brazilian highway system has very few non-tolled vicinal roads in parallel to highways) and making some trips an extremely expensive affair, as compared to average Brazilian earning power (in São Paulo, a 1,000 km (620 mi) round trip may cost upward of two hundreds Brazilian real in some roads, higher than petrol expenses).

=== Canada ===
Most tolled roadways in Canada are bridges to the United States, although a few domestic bridges in some provinces have tolls. Toll highways disappeared, for the most part, in the 1970s and 1980s. In the 1990s, political pressure dropped the new tolls on an upgraded section of the Trans-Canada Highway in New Brunswick. Highway 407 in the Greater Toronto Area is a modern toll route and does not have collection booths but an overhead sensor. It's heavily criticized as the government leased it for 99 years with the company having unlimited control of the highway and tolls so it is expensive, but still a necessity for gridlocked Toronto. Nova Scotia has a toll highway on the Trans Canada Highway between Debert and Oxford.

=== Colombia ===
Many highways in Colombia charge tolls. Motorcycles are allowed to bypass for free.

=== Ecuador ===
The Pan-American Highway in Ecuador charges tolls. Motorcycles pay a reduced fare.

=== Mexico ===
Mexico has an extensive system of toll roads or Autopistas. Autopistas are built and funded by Federal taxes and are built to nearly identical standards as the US Interstate Highways System. Also, many states in Mexico have their own toll roads such as Puebla, Veracruz and Nuevo León. All federal toll highways operate with 3 payment options, cash, credit card and electronic tag IAVE. IAVE in all the highways is operated by Caminos y Puentes Federales (CAPUFE).

=== Panama ===
Most of the toll roads in Panama were built in the mid-1990s, with the exception of the Arraijan-Chorrerra Highway. The three modern toll roads were built after the transportation plan made by the Government of Japan in the mid-1980s using the BOT formula. This highways are the Corredor Norte in the north of the Panama City, and the Corredor Sur in the south. Another highway was built and is the Panama-Colon Highway.

=== Puerto Rico ===
There are several toll roads in Puerto Rico, where toll roads are called "autopista" (which loosely translates to "car track") and toll houses are called "peaje".

=== United States ===
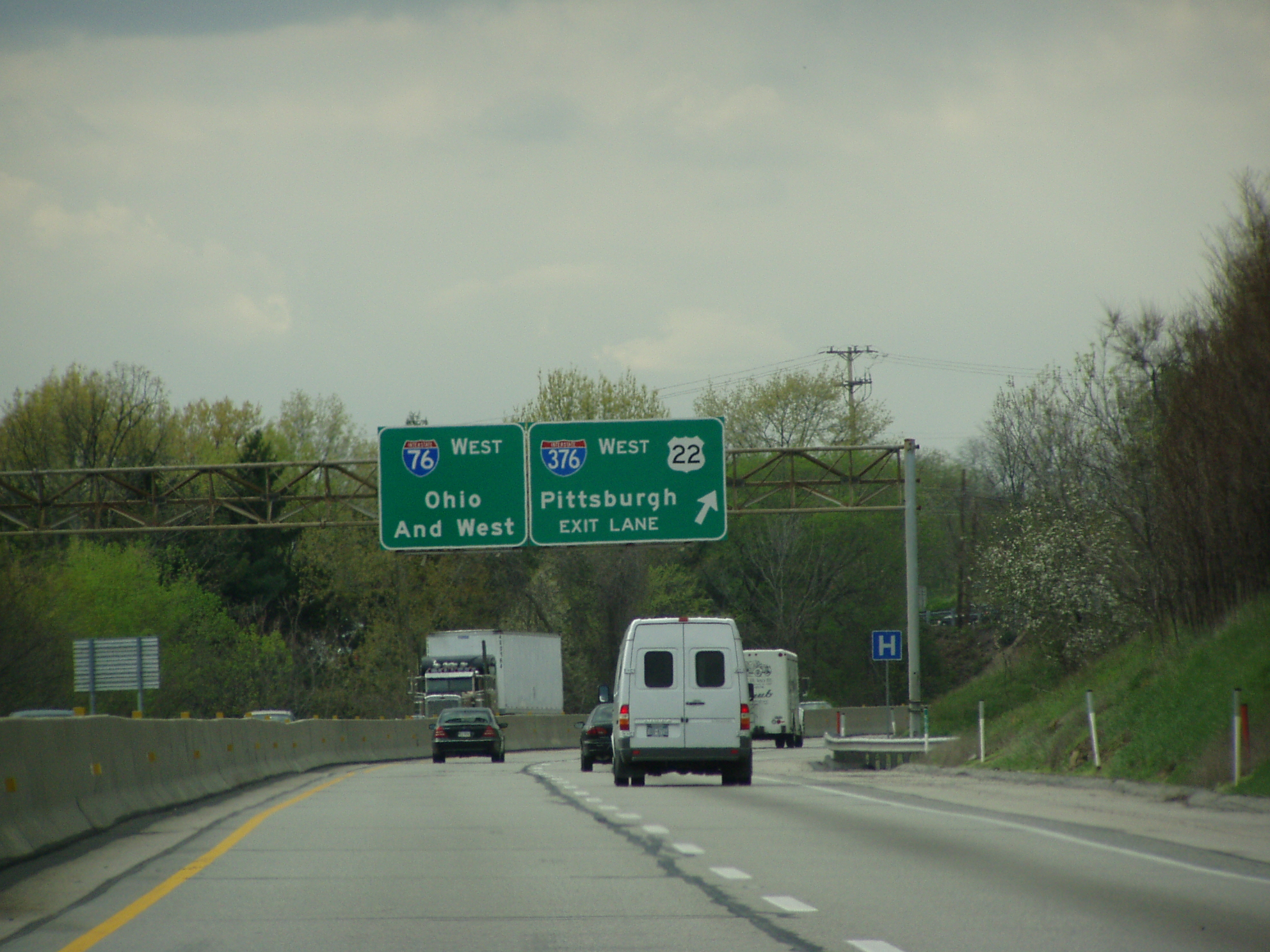
Pennsylvania Turnpike westbound, approaching Pittsburgh interchange with I-376/US 22.

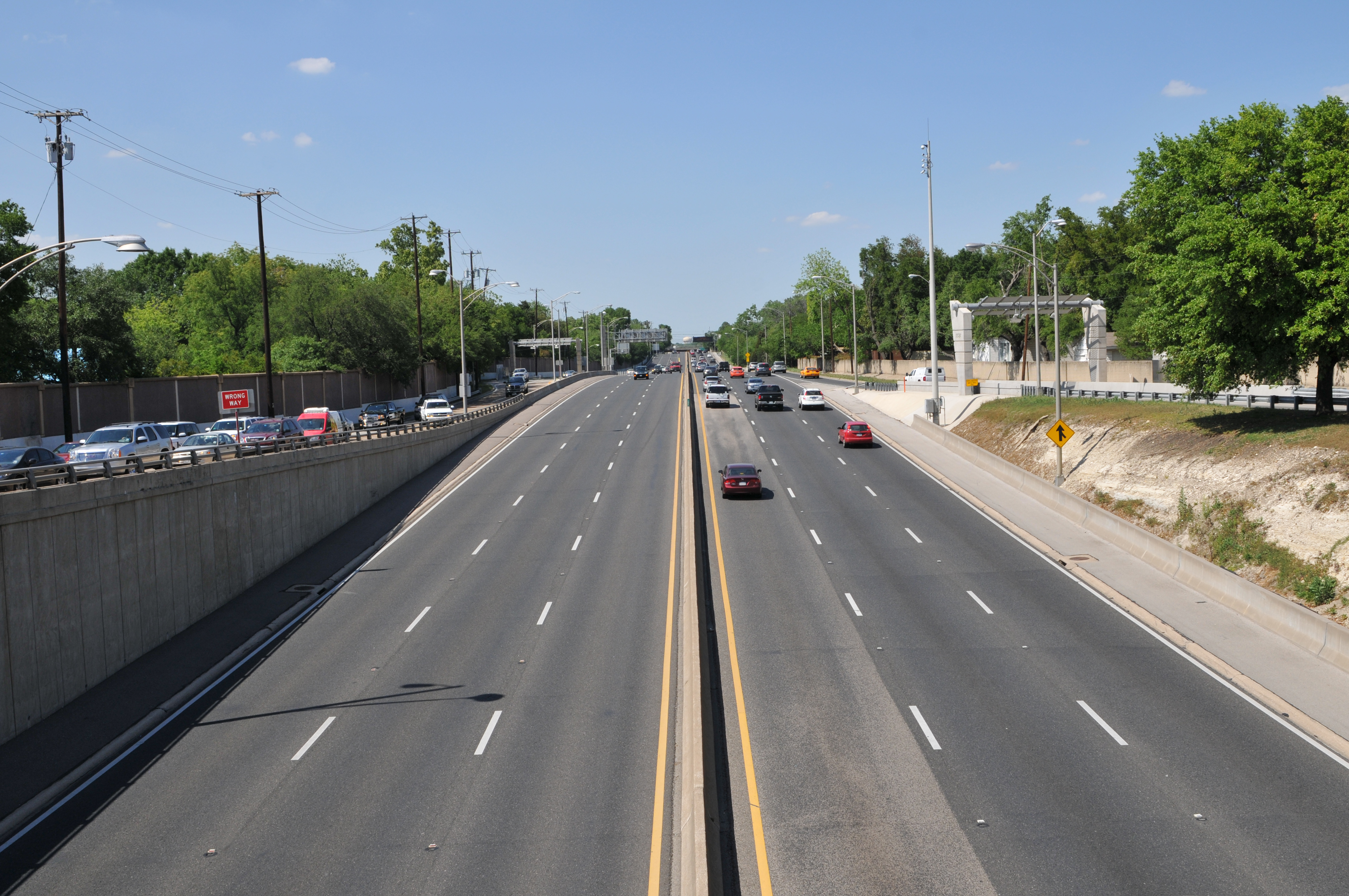
Dallas North Tollway just north of the Northwest Highway

A toll road in the United States, especially near the east coast, is often called a turnpike. The term turnpike originated from the turnstile or gate which blocked passage until the fare was paid at a toll house (or toll booth in current terminology). Most tolled facilities in the US today use an electronic toll collection system as an alternative to paying cash. Examples of this are the E-ZPass system used on most toll bridges and toll roads in the eastern U.S. from North Carolina to Maine and Illinois; Houston's EZ Tag, which also works in other parts of the state of Texas, Oklahoma's Pikepass (which also works in Texas and Kansas), California's FasTrak, Illinois' I-Pass, and Florida's SunPass. Toll roads are only in 26 states as of 2006. The majority of states without any turnpikes are in the West and South.

After a halt in toll road construction following the establishment of the Interstate Highway System in 1956, many states are going back to implementing tolls to fund capital improvements and manage congestion. This is because the cost of expanding and maintaining the highway network is increasing faster than the amount of revenue that can be generated by the federal gasoline tax for the Highway Trust Fund. Years after abolishing tolls, Kentucky and Connecticut have both re-examinined the possibility of reinstating tolls on some highways, while several other states are advancing the construction of new toll roads to supplement their existing networks of toll-free expressways.

== Oceania ==
=== Australia ===
In Australia, a small number of motorways have been tolled due to cover the expense of their construction. Such roads can be found in the Australian cities of Brisbane, Sydney and Melbourne. There are no toll roads in the Australian states of South Australia, Western Australia, Tasmania or any of the mainland territories. Toll collection is by electronic toll collection; there are no longer any cash booths in Australia.

In Brisbane, there are three tollway operators (Brisbane City Council, Queensland Motorways, and RiverCity Motorway). Brisbane City Council owns and operates the Go Between Bridge over the Brisbane River in the city. Queensland Motorways operates the tolls on the Sir Leo Hielscher Bridges, and another two on the Logan Motorway on the south side. RiverCity Motorway operates the Clem Jones Tunnel, which runs underneath the city between the inner southern and northern suburbs. All toll collection points are electronically operated. Another company, BrisConnections, is currently constructing another toll tunnel (the longest tunnel in Australia) called the Airport Link, and will allow traffic to flow from the northern Clem Jones - Inner City Bypass interchange, direct to Brisbane Airport. Construction is due to be complete in 2012. International Travellers and people that are new to Brisbane should note, the penalty for non payment of tolls is in excess of $140 (per trip).

In Melbourne, there are two companies that operate tollways within the Melbourne metropolitan area. Transurban operates CityLink covering sections of the Monash Freeway, Southern Link, Western Link and the upgraded sections of the Tullamarine Freeway. ConnectEast operates EastLink that runs through the Eastern Suburbs of Melbourne. All Melbourne tollways are electronically tolled. The West Gate Bridge opened as a toll bridge upon its completion in 1978, however the toll was abolished in 1985.

In Sydney, many of the motorways contain at least one tolled section with a mixture of government and private ownership. The State Government owns the Sydney Harbour Bridge and Sydney Harbour Tunnel, while the M2 Motorway, M4 Motorway, M5 Motorway, Eastern Distributor, Westlink M7 and Lane Cove Tunnel are privately operated by a variety of companies such as Macquarie Infrastructure, Transurban, and to a lesser extent Industry Super funds such as Retail Employees Super, SunSuper, and the Industry Funds Management which partly own the M5 motorway in South Western Sydney.

As well as the tolled motorways, the Cross City Tunnel - an east–west route underneath the Sydney CBD - was opened to traffic in 2005. This road has become somewhat controversial due to the relatively high toll charge and the closure of surrounding roads designed to funnel traffic through the tunnel.

All Sydney tollways accept E-tags; the Westlink M7, Sydney Harbour Tunnel, Cross City Tunnel, Lane Cove Tunnel and from 1 December 2007 on the M2 Motorway have no cash booths, just E-Tag readers to zoom on through as they charge their tolls only through electronic tolling methods or through the use of number plate reading as you go through, then you have to pay after a certain time frame (for example; before 24 hours), otherwise you will get a fine in the mail. The M5 Motorway moved to electronic only tolling in 2013. Tolls on the M4 Motorway were abolished in 2010. An E-Tag is an RFID device that allow a driver to pass through a toll point without physically stopping. When a vehicle fitted with an E-Tag passes through a toll collection point, the E-Tag identifies the electronic account of the vehicle passing through and the toll-road operator recovers the toll via that account. There are four providers of E-tag accounts in New South Wales (RTA, RoamTag, Interlink Roads, and M2 Consortium). All tags provided by these four providers can be used on every E-Tag-enabled tollway in Australia.

=== New Zealand ===
- Auckland Harbour Bridge was opened in 1959 and operated as a toll bridge until 1984. In the 1960s a group of university students attempted to disrupt the toll system by repeatedly crossing the bridge using motor-scooters (to which a very low toll applied), and paying their toll in £5 notes; the hope was that they would exhaust the supplies of change held at the toll booths. However, the toll authority got wind of their plans and got a very large supply of small change (copper coinage), so the students were soon weighed down with large amounts of small change.
- The Lyttelton Road Tunnel, linking the City of Christchurch with the harbour at Lyttelton, was originally a Toll Tunnel built in 1962. The government of the day promised that as soon as the tunnel was paid for, the toll would be removed The promise was kept, and the toll was removed in the mid-1970s once the tunnel had been paid off. The Tunnel Authority building and toll booths are still there at the Heathcote end.
- The City of Tauranga operates a toll road running between the outlying settlement of Tauriko on State Highway 2 and central business district of the city. This toll road also act as a feeder route for the Tauranga Harbour Bridge. Tolls are collected by staff operating tollbooths at the western end of the road.
- The Northern Gateway Toll Road is a 7.5 km (4.7 mi) motorway extension to State Highway 1 just north of Auckland. Northbound, the toll road begins just before Orewa and ends via a pair of road tunnels through the Johnstone Hills near Puhoi. The toll road opened in January 2009 and gives motorists a choice between a more direct route or State Highway 17 via Orewa. Tolling is implemented through automatic vehicle license plate reading with cameras in an overhead gantry.

== See also ==
- Toll road
- List of toll roads
- High-occupancy toll
- Private highway
- Electronic toll collection
  - TELEPASS (Italy)
  - SunPass (Florida, USA)
  - E-PASS (Florida, USA)
  - E-ZPass (northeastern USA)
  - I-PASS (Illinois, USA)
  - FasTrak (California, USA)
  - Pikepass (Oklahoma, USA)
  - TxTag (Texas, USA)
  - Highway 407 (Toronto, ON, Canada)
- CityLink (Australia)
- London congestion charge
- Turnpike trusts the first organisations empowered to collect tolls on English roads
- Malaysian expressway system
- Tunnels and bridges in Hong Kong
- Expressways of Japan
- Toll roads in Europe
- Toll roads in the United States
