= M5 highway =

M5 highway may refer to:

- M5 highway (Russia)
- M5 highway (Belarus)
- M-5 highway (Montenegro)
