= Ahmadbeyli–Fuzuli–Shusha highway =

Highway in Azerbaijan

Ahmadbayli–Fuzuli–Shusha highway

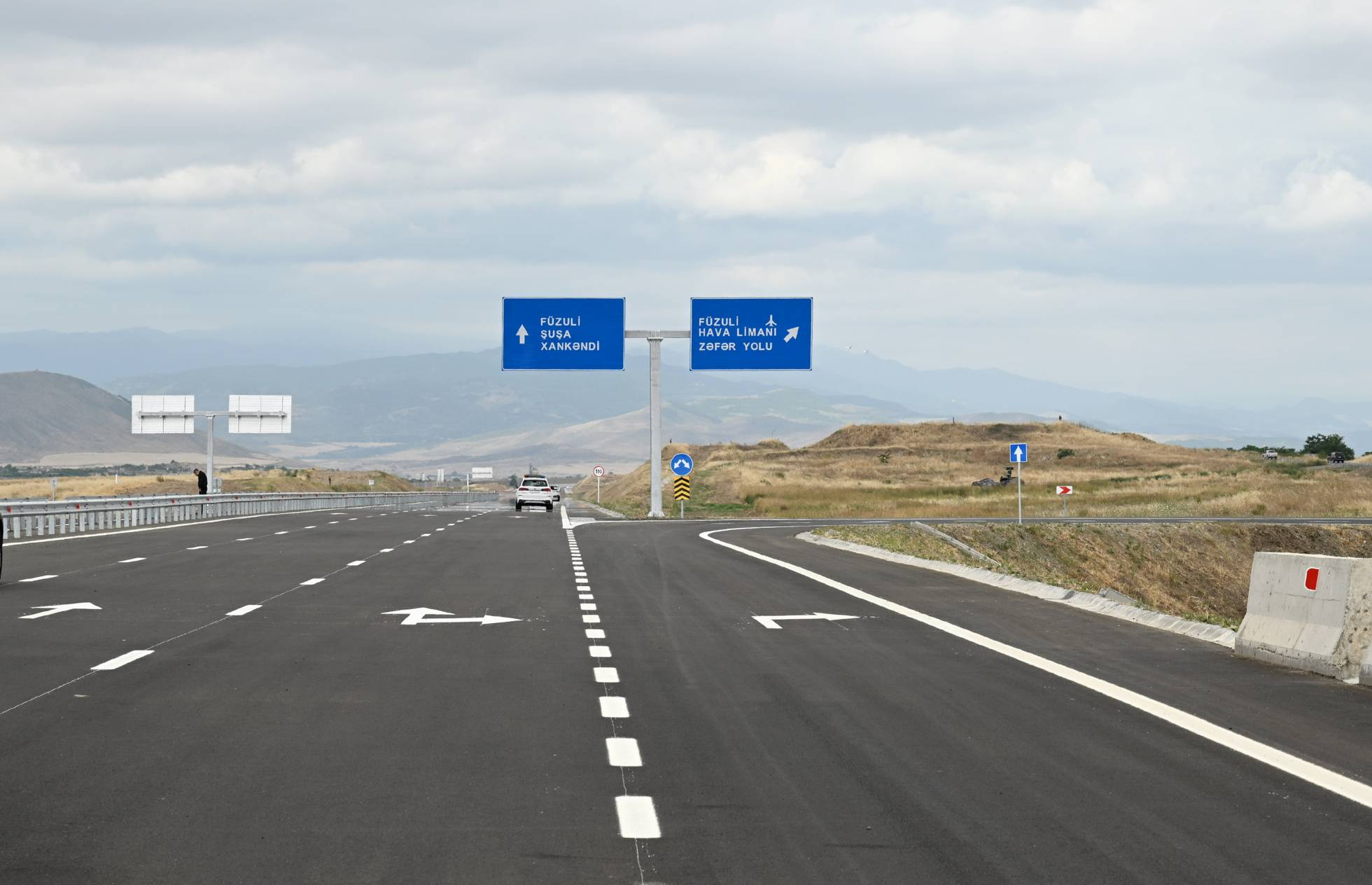
- The highway in July 2025

Route information
- Length: 81.7 km (50.8 mi)
- Existed: 3 July 2025–present

Major junctions
- SW end: Ahmadbeyli (Fuzuli District)
- Fuzuli
- NE end: Shusha

Location
- Country: Azerbaijan

Highway system
- Roads in Azerbaijan

Ahmadbayli–Fuzuli–Shusha highway (Azerbaijani: Əhmədbəyli–Füzuli–Şuşa magistral avtomobil yolu) is a highway in Azerbaijan connecting Ahmadbayli, Fuzuli, and Shusha. The highway is 81.7 km long and was opened on 3 July 2025.

== History ==
Construction began following a foundation-laying ceremony held during a visit by President Ilham Aliyev and First Lady Mehriban Aliyeva to the formerly occupied Fuzuli District and Jabrayil District on 16 November 2020, shortly after the end of the Second Nagorno-Karabakh War.

On 17 November 2020, a presidential decree was issued on measures related to the design and construction of the Ahmadbayli–Fuzuli–Shusha road, providing initial funding from the presidential reserve fund in the 2020 state budget to the Azerbaijan Automobile Roads State Agency.

The road was officially opened on 3 July 2025 with the participation of President Ilham Aliyev.

== Design and features ==
The first 48 km of the highway were built with six lanes, while the remaining 33.7 km have four lanes, and the pavement is asphalt concrete.

The road includes major structures such as bridges, tunnels, and viaducts. The highway runs parallel to the Fuzuli–Shusha highway and shortening the route by 19.3 km.

The project was recognized by the International Road Federation (IRF Global) in the category "Innovative Construction Methodology".
