= İkinci Mahmudlu =

- Location within Azerbaijan Location within Karabakh Economic Region
- Coordinates: 39°32′32″N 47°33′29″E
- Country: Azerbaijan
- District: Fuzuli
- Municipality: Əhmədbəyli
- Time zone: UTC+4 (AZT)

Birinci Mahmudlu (also, Makhmudly Vtoroy and Makhmudlu Vtoroye) is a village in the Fuzuli District of Azerbaijan. The village forms part of the municipality of Əhmədbəyli.
