= M2 highway (Belarus) =

Major road in Belarus

M2
- Магістраль М2

Route information
- Length: 34 km (21 mi)

Major junctions
- West end: Minsk
- East end: Minsk National Airport

Location
- Country: Belarus

Highway system
- Roads in Belarus

The M2 (Belarusian: Магістраль М2), Magistral Route Nr. 2 is 34 kilometres (21 mi) long highway in Belarus. The M2 starts after Prospekt Nezavisimost, northeast of the center of the capital Minsk, after MKAD (M9) and leads to Minsk National Airport to the east of the city. The M2 highway runs northeast to the northeast, but turns midway, 17 km (11 mi) after the ring road Smalyavichy District at the Sloboda agglomeration to the southeast towards the airport.
