= M5 highway (Belarus) =

Major road in Belarus

M5
- Магістраль М5

Route information
- Part of E271
- Length: 296 km (184 mi)

Major junctions
- Northwest end: Intersection M 4 near Minsk
- Southeast end: Homieĺ

Location
- Country: Belarus
- Major cities: Babrujsk, Žlobin

Highway system
- Roads in Belarus

М5 highway connects Minsk with Homieĺ. It is a part of European route E271. The highway is around 296 km long. It shares first 12 km with the M4 motorway, branches off it near Privolnyi and runs south-east. Near Babrujsk it crosses with many regional roads. Near Homieĺ it connects to the M8 highway. All road is dual carriageway.

Distance (approx.)	Name	Other roads
0 km	Minsk	M 9
10 km		M 1 / E30
12 km		M 4
29 km	Svislač	P 69
49 km	Marjina Horka	P 59
90 km	Asipovičy	P 72
121 km	Babrujsk	P 98
123 km	Babrujsk	P 67
134 km		P 62
137 km		P 113
146 km	Babrujsk	P 93
151 km	Babrujsk	P 43
155 km	Babrujsk	
188 km		P 90
203 km	Žlobin	P 149
206 km	Žlobin	P 39
242 km	Buda-Kašaliova	P 38
285 km		M 8 / E95
296 km	Homieĺ	
