= Əhmədbəyli, Fuzuli =

Əhmədbəyli
- Municipality
- Location within Azerbaijan Location within Karabakh Economic Region
- Coordinates: 39°33′46″N 47°33′04″E
- Country: Azerbaijan
- District: Fuzuli

Population
  - Total: 5,071
- Time zone: UTC+4 (AZT)

Əhmədbəyli (Ahmedbeyli) is a village and municipality in the Fuzuli District of Azerbaijan. It has a population of 5,071. The municipality consists of the villages of Əhmədbəyli and İkinci Mahmudlu. It is located on the plains at the left bank of the Kondalanchay, a tributary of the Araz River around 20 km northeast of Horadiz. Although captured by Armenian forces in 1993, the village was retaken during Operation Horadiz (January 1994) and remained in Azerbaijani hands thereafter.

== Post-conflict reconstruction ==
Əhmədbəyli is the starting point for the planned new multi-lane highway to Shusha via Fuzuli (announced 16 November 2020) that will link up with the Baku-Shirvan-Saatly-Horadiz route and act as the major artery for the reconstruction of towns and villages destroyed during Armenian occupation or damaged during the 2020 conflict.
