= Roads in Belarus =

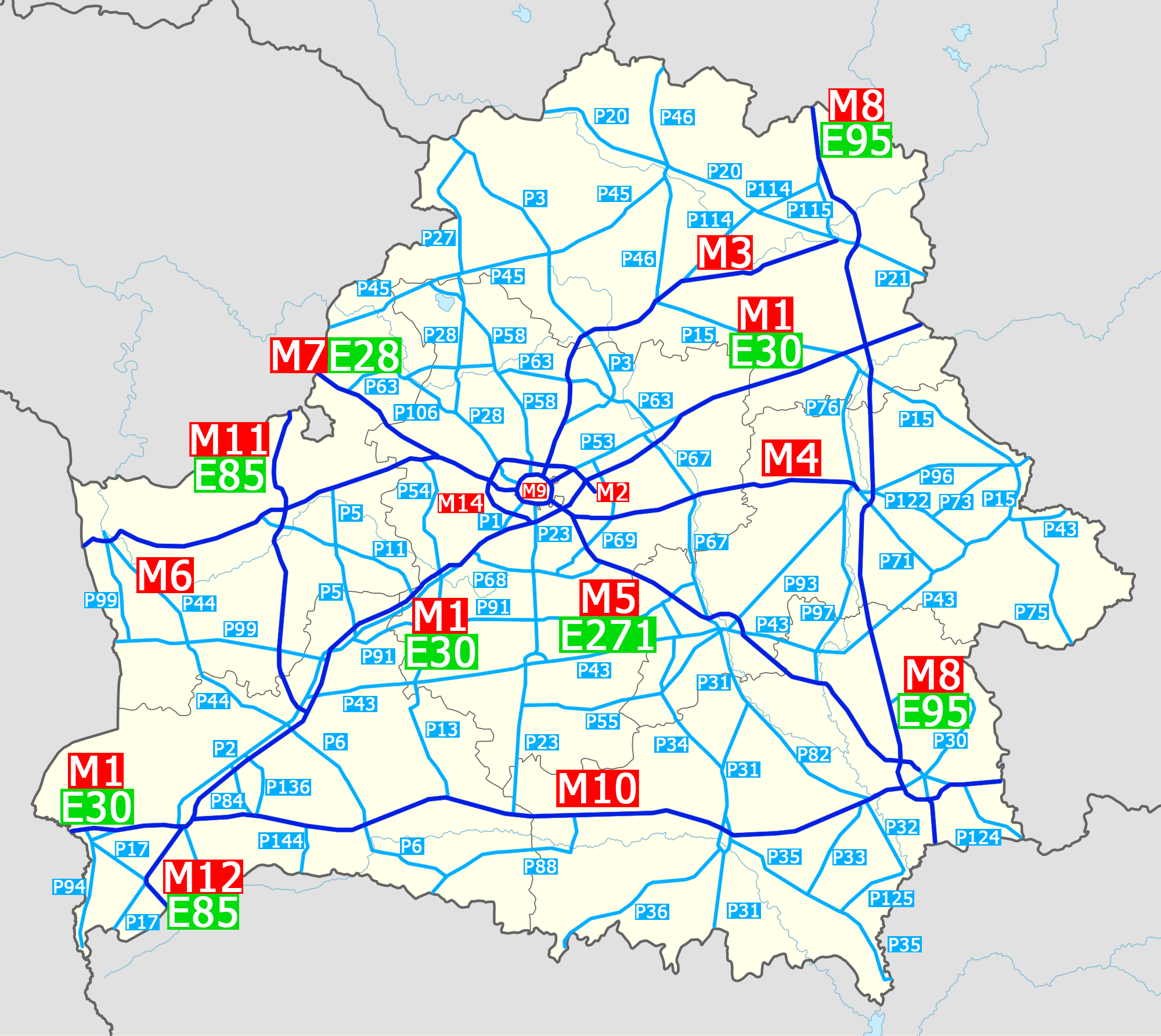
Major automobile roads in Belarus

Automobile roads in Belarus are classified into several categories.

== State-owned common access roads ==
The state-owned roads of common access are managed by the Belavtodor department of the Ministry of Transport and Communications of Belarus. They are classified into republican roads and local roads. Automobile roads may also be owned by persons, businesses, state enterprises, and military.

== Motorway network ==
Belarus has an extensive system of 4-laned dual carriageways and expressways, currently in expansion. Currently they are:

| Highway | Route | Length | European road | Notes |
|---|---|---|---|---|
| M1 | Border of Poland at Brest – Minsk to border with Russia (on to Moscow) | 611 km (380 mi) | E30 (entire route) | Entrances to Dziaržynsk, Pružany, Brest Airport, Brest, Kobryn |
| M2 | Minsk – Minsk International Airport | 34 km (21 mi) | | |
| M3 | Minsk – Viciebsk | 253 km (157 mi) | | Entrances to Lahojsk, "Khatyn" memorial complex and Biešankovičy |
| M4 | Minsk – Smilavičy – Červień – Bierazino – Mahilioŭ | 182 km (113 mi) | | Entrance to Mahilioŭ Airport |
| M5 | Minsk – Homieĺ | 282 km (175 mi) | E271 (entire route) | Entrances to Babrujsk and Žlobin |
| M6 | Minsk – Lida – Hrodna to the border with Poland | 262 km (163 mi) | E28 (Minsk–Volozhin) | Entrances to Valožyn, Lida, Hrodna Airport and Hrodna |
| M7 | Minsk – Border with Lithuania at Kammeny Log | 139 km (86 mi) | E28 (entire route) | Concurrent with M6 from Minsk to Volozhin; entrance to Volozhin |
| M8 | Border with Russia at Ezerische via Vitebsk, Orsha, Mogilev, and Gomel to border with Ukraine at Nowa Huta | 456 km (283 mi) | E95 (entire route) | Entrances to Vitebsk Airport, Orsha, Kopysov, Shklov, Mogilev, Bykhov and Gomel |
| M9 | Ring road around Minsk | 56 km (35 mi) | | Entrance to pension |
| M10 | Border with Russia – Gomel – Kalinkavichy – Pinsk – Kobryn | 526 km (327 mi) | | Entrances to Gomel, Petrikov, Zhitkovichi and Luninets |
| M11 | Border with Lithuania at Benyakoni – Lida – Slonim – intersection with P2 near Byten | 186 km (116 mi) | E85 (entire route) | Entrance to "Radon" sanatorium |
| M12 | Kobryn – border with Ukraine at Mokrany | 55 km (34 mi) | E85 (entire route) | |
| M14 | Outer ring road around Minsk | 160 km (99 mi) (planned); 47 km (29 mi) (in operation) | | Vitebsk–Grodno section opened in 2015 |

=== Local roads ===
- P1: Minsk – Dzyarzhynsk – highway M1
- P2: Stowbtsy – Ivatsevichy – Byaroza – Kobryn
- P3: Lahoysk – Zembin – Begoml – Dokshytsy – Hlybokaye – Sharkawshchyna – Braslaw to the border with Latvia
- P4: Baranovichi – Lyakhavichy to highway P43 near Russinovich
- P5: Baranovichi – Navahrudak – Iwye
- P6: Ivatsevichy – Logishin – Pinsk – Stolin
- P7: Kamyenyets – Zhabinka – Fed'kovichi
- P8: Pinsk – Luninets
- P9: Vysokaye to the border with Poland
- P10: Lubcha – Navahrudak – Dzyatlava
- P11: Highway M6 near Porechany – Byarozawka – Navahrudak – Karelichy – Mir
- P12: Nesvizh – Kletsk
- P13: Kletsk – Hantsavichy – Luninets
- P14: Polotsk – Dzisna – Myory – Braslaw
- P15: Krichev – Orsha – Lepiel; entrance to the city of Horki
- P16: Tyuhinichi – Vysokaye to the border with Poland
- P17: Brest to the border with Ukraine
- P18: Verhnedvinsk – Sharkovshchina – Koziany
- P19: Highway M1 – Talachyn – Krupki – highway M1
- P20: Vitebsk – Polotsk to the border with Latvia; entrances to the cities of Polotsk, Novopolotsk and Verhnedvinsk
- P21: Vitebsk to the border with Russia
- P22: Orsha – Dubrovno – highway M1
- P23: Minsk – Slutsk – Mikashevichy; entrances to the towns of Slutsk and Soligorsk
- P24: Polotsk – Rossony
- P25: Vitebsk – Syanno – Tolochin
- P26: Talachyn - Kruglae - Nezhkovo
- P27: Braslaw – Vidzy – Pastavy – Myadzyel; access to Lithuanian border at Vidzy
- P28: Minsk – Maladzyechna – Myadzyel – Narach; entrance to the city of Vileyka and the village of Gatovichi
- P29: Ushachi - Vileyka
- P30: Gomel – Vietka – Chachersk – Yamnoe
- P31: Highway M5 – Babruysk – Mozyr to the border with Ukraine; entrance to the cities of Babruysk, Yelsk and Mozyr
- P32: Rechitsa – Loyew
- P33: Rechitsa – Hoiniki
- P34: Osipovichi – Glusk – Ozarichi
- P35: Kalinkovichi – Brahin - Komarin to the border with Ukraine; entrance to the city of Brahin
- P36: Mozyr – Lelchitsy – Milosevic to the border with Ukraine
- P37: Mikhalki – Naroulia to the border with Ukraine
- P38: Highway M5 at Buda-Koshelevo – Chechersk – Krasnopolle
- P39: Rogachev – Zhlobin – highway M5
- P40: Borovilany – Ostroshitsy – Lahoysk; entrance to "Aziorny" complex
- P41: Slonim – Dziarečyn – Masty – Skidzyel' to the border with Lithuania, entrance to the village of Lunno
- P42: Grodno – Hoža to the border with Lithuania
- P43: Highway P2 – Ivatsevichy – Babruysk – Krychaw to the border with Russia (onto Moscow)
- P44: Grodno – Kosava – Ruzhany – Ivatsevichy
- P45: Polotsk – Hlybokaye to the border with Lithuania
- P46: Lepiel – Polotsk to the border with Russia
- P47: Svislach – Pruzhany – highway P81
- P48: Vorona – Ashmyany – Yuratishki – Iwye; entrance to Lithuanian border
- P50: Masty – Zelva – Ruzhany
- P51: Astryna – Shchuchyn – Vawkavysk
- P52: Highway P45 at Hoža – Belarusian Nuclear Power Plant – Astravyets – Ashmyany
- P53: Sloboda – Zhodzina – Barysaw – Novosady; entrance to the Mound of Glory
- P54: Pershai - Ivyanets - Stowbtsy - Nesvizh
- P55: Babruysk - Hlusk - Lyuban – highway P23
- P56: Maladzyechna - Volozhin
- P57: Kutchino - Lyuban - Viatčyn – highway M10
- P58: Minsk – Kalachi – Myadzyel
- P59: Lahoysk – Smalyavichy – Maryina Horka
- P60: Kupa – Zanarač – Brusy
- P61: Uzda – Kapyl – Hulevich (via Starica)
- P62: Chashniki – Bobr – Babruysk (via Klichaw)
- P63: Barysaw – Vileyka – Ashmyany
- P64: Stowbtsy – Mir
- P65: Zaslawye – Dzerzinsk – Voziera
- P66: Kalachi – Lahoysk
- P67: Barysaw – Byerazino – Babruysk
- P68: Pukhavichy – Uzda – Negoreloye
- P69: Smalyavichy – Smilavičy – Praŭdzinski – Shatsk
- P70: Kniažycy – Horki – Lenino
- P71: Mogilev – Slawharad
- P72: Asipovichy – Svislach
- P73: Chavusy – Mstsislaw to the border with Russia
- P74: Cherykaw – Krasnapolle – Khotimsk
- P75: Highway P43 near Klimavichy – Kastsyukovichy to the border with Russia; entrances to Klimavichy and Kastsyukovichy
- P76: Orsha – Shklov – Mogilev
- P77: Shklov – Belynichi (via Prigani)
- P78: Olekshitsy – Volkovysk – Porazava – Pruzhany
- P79: Klichaw - Chechevichi
- P80: Slabada – Papiernya
- P81: Pruzhany to the border with Poland; entrance to the village of Viskuli
- P82: Aktsyabrsky – Parichi – Rechitsa; entrance to Svetlagorska
- P83: Brest – Kamyenyets – Belovezhskaya Pushcha National Park
- P84: Byaroza – Drahichyn
- P85: Slonim – Vysokaye
- P86: Highway M8 – Bogushevsk – Syanno – Lepiel – Myadzyel
- P87: Vitebsk – Orsha
- P88: Zhytkavichy – Davyd-Haradok to the border with Ukraine
- P89: Lida – Trokeli – Hieraniony to the border with Lithuania
- P90: Parichi – Čyrvony Bierah – highway M5
- P91: Highway M5 – Asipovichy – Baranovichi
- P92: Maryina Horka – Staryya Darohi
- P93: Mogilev – Babruysk
- P94: Brest – Tamašoŭka to the border with Ukraine; access to Polish border
- P95: Lyntupy – Svir – Smarhon’ – Kreva – Halshany
- P96: Mogilev – Rasna – Mstsislaw; entrances to Chavusy and Drybin
- P97: Mogilev – Bychaw – Rahachow
- P98: Border with Poland – Kamyenyets – Šarašova – Svislach; entrance to the village of Vaŭkastaviec
- P99: Baranovichi – Slonim – Vawkavysk – Pahraničny – Grodno; entrance to Polish border
- P100: Masty – Vyalikaya Byerastavitsa
- P101: Pruzhany – Byaroza
- P102: Vysokaye – Kamyenyets – Kobryn
- P103: Kletsk – Lyakhavichy
- P104: Zhabinka – Kobryn
- P105: Gantsevichi – Logishin
- P106: Molodechno – Smarhon’; entrance to Smarhon’
- P107: Nesvizh – Cimkavičy
- P108: Baranovichi – Molchad – Dzyatlava
- P109: Liozna – Arechaŭsk – highway M8
- P110: Hlybokaye – Pastavy – Lyntupy to the border with Lithuania; entrance to the Lithuanian border
- P111: Beshankovichy – Chashniki
- P112: Vitebsk – Surazh to the border with Russia
- P113: Syanno – Beshankovichy – Ushachy
- P114: Haradok – Ula – Kamien'
- P115: Vitebsk – Haradok – highway M8
- P116: Ushachy – Lepiel
- P117: Border with Russia – Kokhanovichi – Verhnedvinsk
- P118: Highway P62 near Lyubonichi – Kirawsk
- P119: Slawharad – Nikanovich – highway M8
- P120: Bykhaw – Byalynichy
- P121: Shkloŭ – Kruglae
- P122: Mogilev – Cherykaw – Kastsyukovichy
- P123: Highway P93 at Sialiec – Mastok – Drybin – Horki
- P124: Vietka – Dobrush – Cierachoŭka – border with Russia and Ukraine
- P125: Loyew – Brahin
- P126: Yelsk – Naroulia
- P128: Turov – Lelchitsy – Slovechno – highway P31
- P129: Gomel – Gomel Airport
- P130: Buda-Koshelevo – Uvarovichi – Kalinin
