= State Agency of Azerbaijan Automobile Roads =

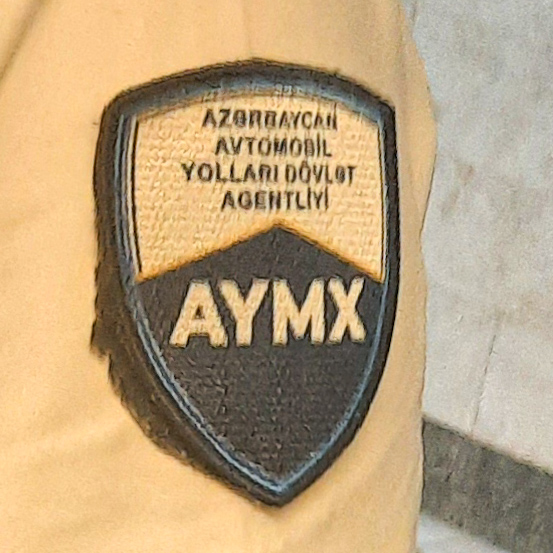
Azerbaijan State Agency of Automobile Roads badge

State Agency of Azerbaijan Automobile Roads or “AAY” (short for: Azərbaycan Avtomobil Yolları) is an open joint-stock company that deals with automobile road industry and all relevant works related to this field such as constructions of bridges, tunnels, highways, and also control and protection these road facilities within the area of the road infrastructure. The company is responsible for renovation, repair, reconstruction and construction of automobile roads that is approximately 17755 km length (divided into national and local automobile roads that are 4537 km and 13217 km length, respectively. There are also 1343 bridges under the control of the company. Mammadov Saleh is the chairman of the company.

== History ==
The road networks in Azerbaijan was started to be established in middle of the 19th century especially within the territory of Baku Governorate due to the transportation of oil and oil products. One of such roads considered to be built in 1850 but the first highway that established around the residential area was located in Lachin region which was included to Elizavetpol Governorate (starting from 1918, its name was changed to Ganja Governorate). In the following decade, Yevlakh-Shusha-Nakhchivan-Yerevan highway constructed (1860). Due to importation of automobiles in 20th century, more ways were started to be built and even a road construction organization was set up in 1918 equipped with 15 trucks, 12 road rollers and 4 graders. During the period of Azerbaijan Democratic Republic, “Ministry of Roads, Post and Telegraph” was replaced that organization. From the collapse of ADR to the starting of ww2, various organizations had control over the roads of Azerbaijan such as Highway and Dirt Roads Department (1920), Highway-Water Economy Department (1921), Highway Roads Department (1937). The Kish bridge in Shaki district was built in those years (1925-1932). During and after ww2, the road construction process gained momentum and several highways built in this period such as Baku-Agstafa (1944-1945, 461 km length), Ujar-Zardab and Hajigabul-Salyan (1958).

Starting from 1974, the “Ministry of Automobile Road Construction and Maintenance” and in 1989 Azerbaijan Automobile Road Production Association were accountable for road infrastructure.

“Azeravtoyol” Production Association and after “Azeravtoyol” Public Company were the first organizations established after Azerbaijan gained its independence in 1990s.

Currently, “Azeravtoyol” OJSC carries out the works in the automobile road industry according to the presidential decree signed on 9 March 2016.

In 2017, with total length of 1,335 km roads were reconstructed by this company.

== Collaborating organizations ==
State Agency of Azerbaijan Automobile Roads have been cooperating with Asian Development Bank (ADB) since 1999 in many projects such as Second Road Network Development Program - Project 1 (Construction of Ujar-Zardab-Aghjabadi Highway), Second Road Network Development Program-Project 2 (construction of Jalilabad Shorsulu Highway and construction of Yevlakh-Zagatala-Georgia and Shaki Highway).
