= European route E271 =

Road in trans-European E-road network

E271

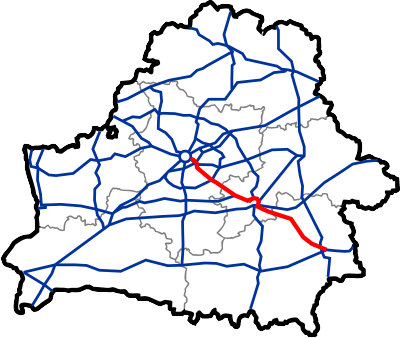

Route information
- Length: 311 km (193 mi)

Major junctions
- From: Minsk (Belarus)
- To: Homieĺ (Belarus)

Location
- Countries: Belarus
- Major cities: Minsk; Babrujsk; Homieĺ

Highway system
- International E-road network; A Class; B Class

European route E271 is a Class B road part of the International E-road network. It runs only through Belarus, begins in Minsk and ends in Homieĺ.

Route: Minsk - Asipovičy - Babrujsk - Žlobin - Homieĺ.

On entire length, E271 follows the route of Belarusian national highway M 5.
