= Byahoml =

Byahoml Бягомль (Belarusian) Бегомль (Russian)
- Urban-type settlement
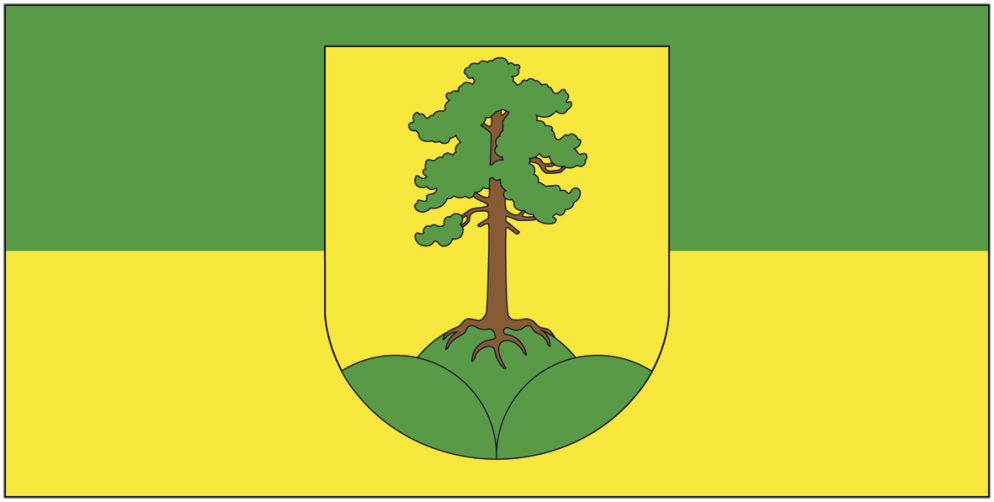
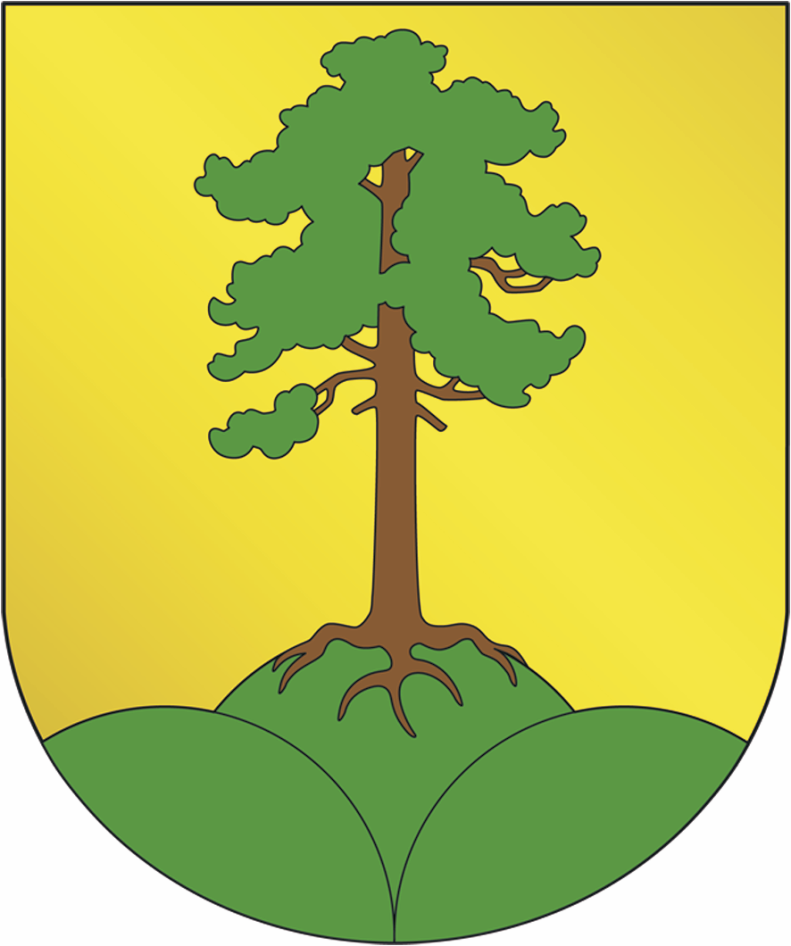
- Flag Seal

- Location within Belarus Location within Europe
- Coordinates: 54°44′N 28°03′E
- Country: Belarus
- Region: Vitebsk Region
- District: Dokshytsy District
- Founded: 1582

Population (2023)
  - Total: 2,457
- Time zone: UTC+3 (MSK)
- Postal code: 211730
- Area codes: +375 2157 3
- License plate: 2

Byahoml or Begoml (Belarusian: Бягомль, romanized: Biahomĺ; (Note: Official transliteration.) Russian: Бегомль; Polish: Bieholin) is an urban-type settlement in Dokshytsy District, Vitebsk Region, Belarus. It is located on the M3 highway 100 kilometres (62 mi) from Minsk to the north, 157 kilometres (98 mi) from Vitebsk to the south and 30 kilometres (19 mi) from Dokshytsy to the east. In 2008, its population was 3,059. As of 2023, it has a population of 2,457.

== History ==
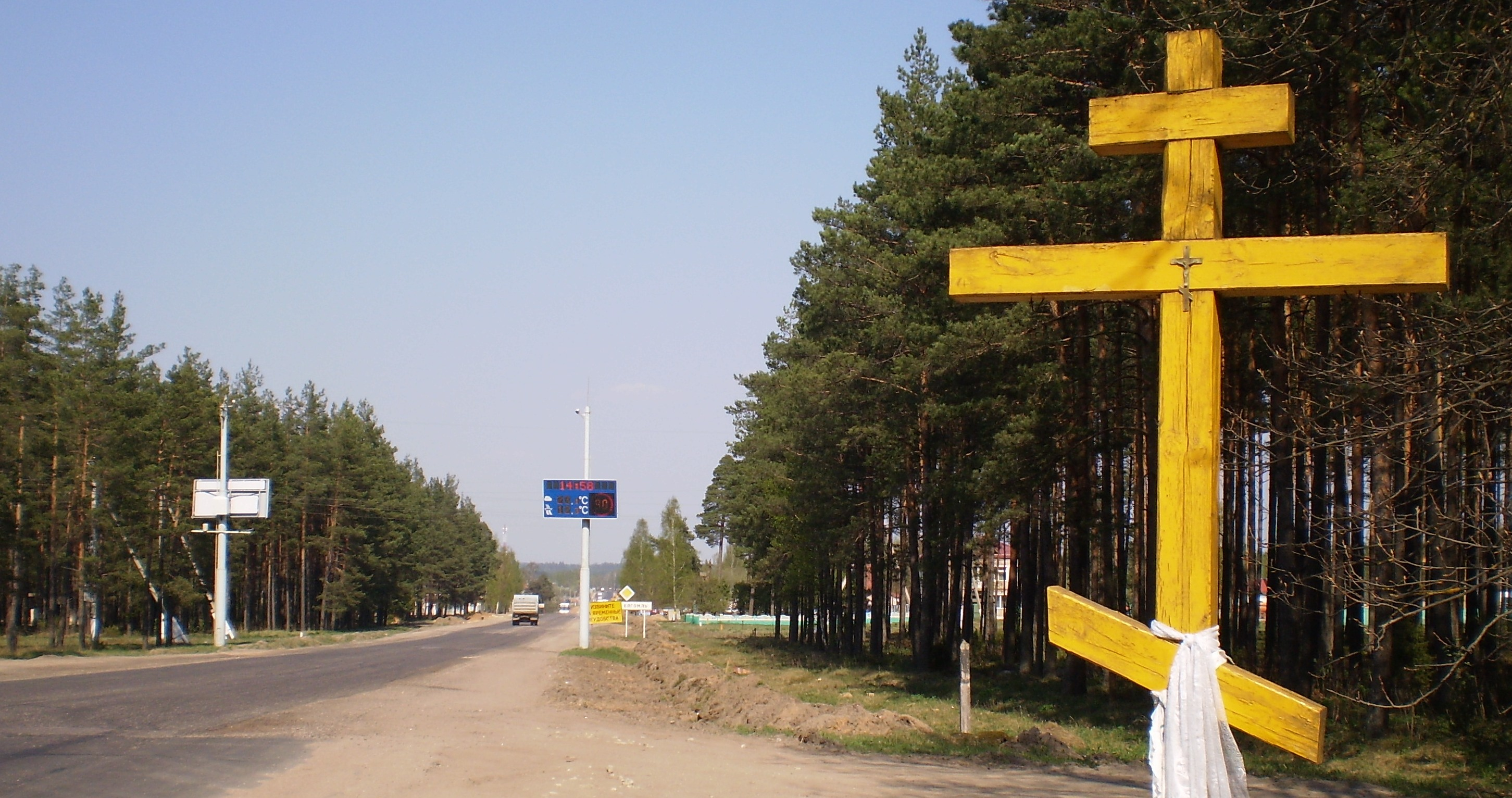
Road view

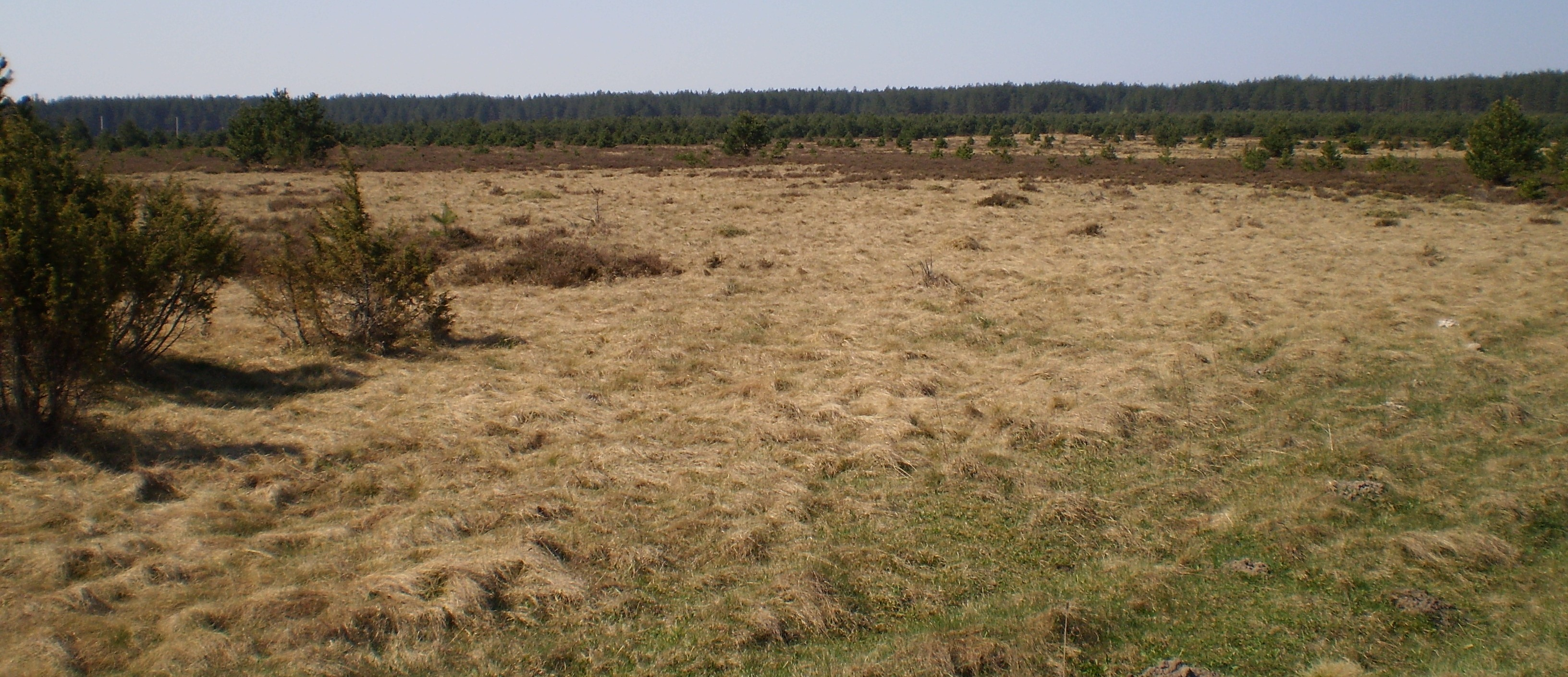
Guerrilla airdrome in May, 2009

The first written records of Begoml date to 1582 and identify it as a village on an estate belonging to the Bishop of Vil'nya at Vaucha in the Minsk povet (administrative region) of the Grand Duchy of Lithuania. By 1861, it had become the central volost (county) of Borisovsky Uyezd. The main town of the volost by 1886, it then comprised a village of 43 households, a church, a school, and a hospital. In 1924 it became the centre of Begoml District and on September 27, 1938 it was designated an urban settlement. Since 1960, Begoml has been part of Dokshitsy.

During the German-Soviet War Begoml and the surrounding district were occupied by the Wehrmacht. On July 2 1941, at about 12:00 midday, a vanguard of 39 tanks of the 3rd Panzer Group drove straight into the township. A Soviet partisan movement then formed and began to counterattack. This included nine partisan brigades working with other separate groups. Guerilla operations to clear German forces from the area continued until the arrival of the Red Army on 1 July 1944.

During the war, Begomlian guerrillas operated from a pre-war airfield. This fell into disuse after the conflict and the land was subsequently used to build apartments. Today, the neighborhood is still called "The Airdrome" .

The history of Begoml has inspired poets and writers.

On June 29, 2009, by decree of the Belarusian President, Begoml, along with 21 other localities in the Republic of Belarus, was awarded a pennant "For courage and resilience during the years of the Great Patriotic War".

== Heraldry ==
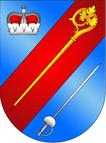
Coat of arms by M.M.Elinskaja, V.A.Ljahor

In 2008, proposals to design a coat of arms for Begoml were submitted for approval with the eventual winning entry created by author M.M.Elinskaja and painter V.A.Ljahor.

== Economy and industry ==
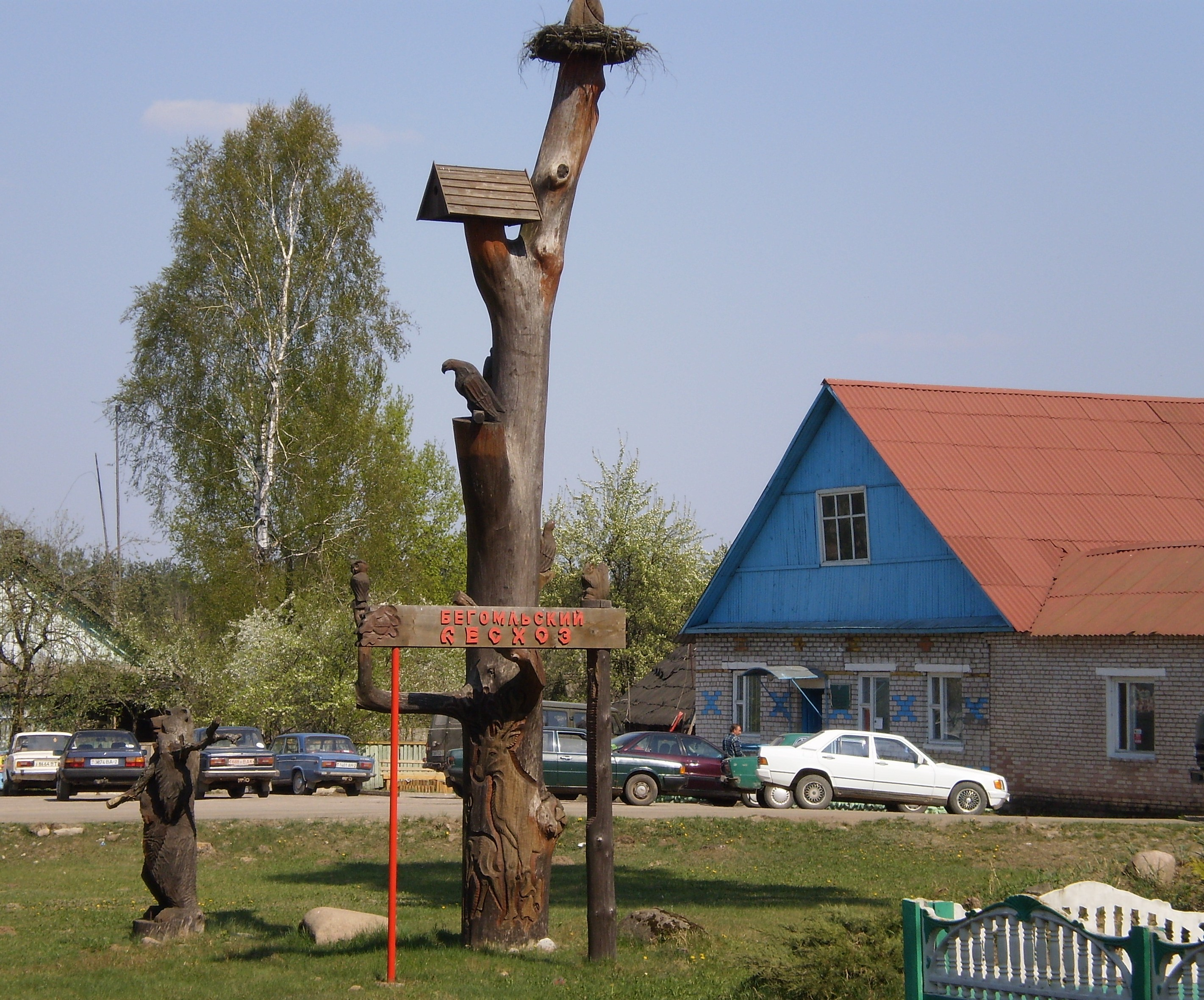
A Begomlian timber enterprise.

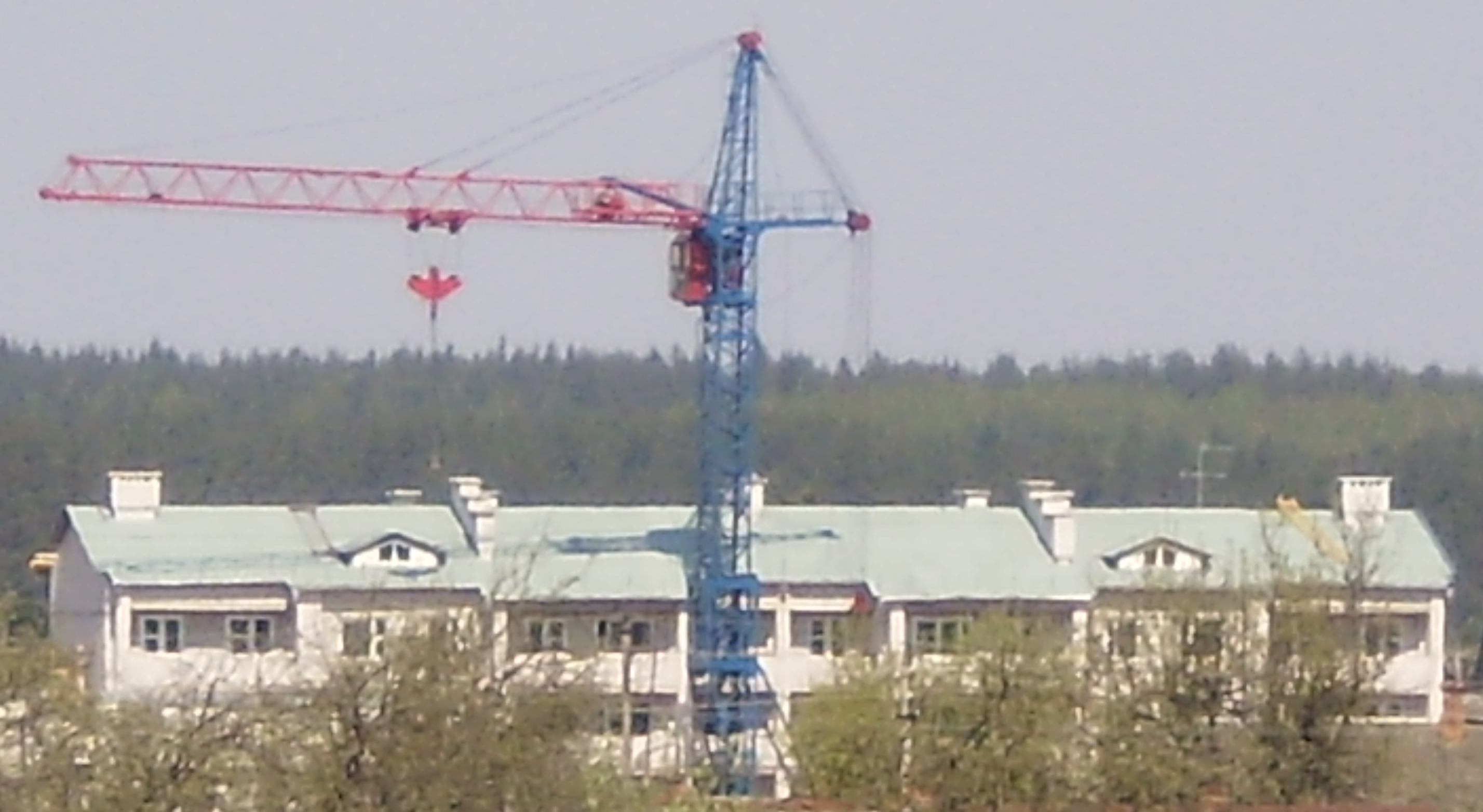
Multi-story housing under construction in Airdrome area.

Various products are manufactured at facilities in Begoml by a number of companies while a distillery was constructed here in the 1870s.

According to the "Plan of reorganization of the republican unitary enterprises into the open joint stock companies for the period of 2011-2013" approved by the Council of Ministers of the Republic of Belarus (No. 348 dated 21.03.2011), Begoml's state owned “Vetraz” will become a joint stock company. Vetraz has 50 employees producing incubators, condensers, Christmas-tree decorations and other products. It has suffered from a lack of investment in its condenser and consumer goods businesses making it uncompetitive in the marketplace.

Begoml is also home to factories producing electronic goods including radio components as well as building materials and bed linen.

As with other townships in Belarus, Begoml is looking to create new manufacturing plants, new business enterprises and for the general development of industries that prevent young people migrating to bigger cities.

The site of Highway М3 (Belarus), passing through Begoml, has been reconstructed to improve on-call and emergency roadside service.

A new telephone exchange with a capacity of 1216 numbers is being built while construction of multi-storey housing is already complete.

== Local facilities ==
The Borovoe Sanatorium is located 3 kilometres (1.9 mi) from the town while the "Begomlsky" hunting lodge is some 12 kilometres (7.5 mi) distant. A hotel complex is planned on the site of the old bakery with overnight parking and an amusement arcade.

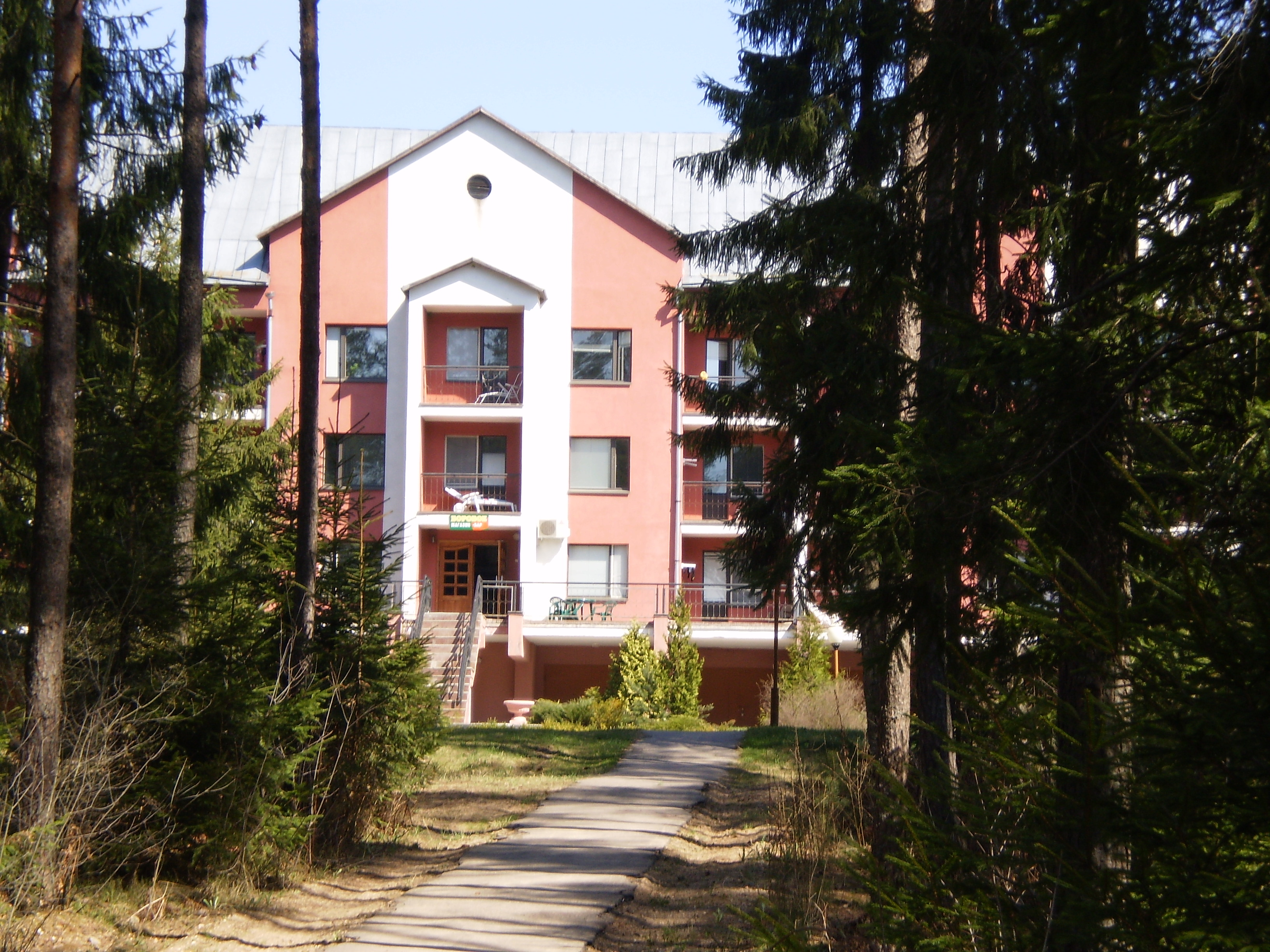
Sanatorium "Borovoe"

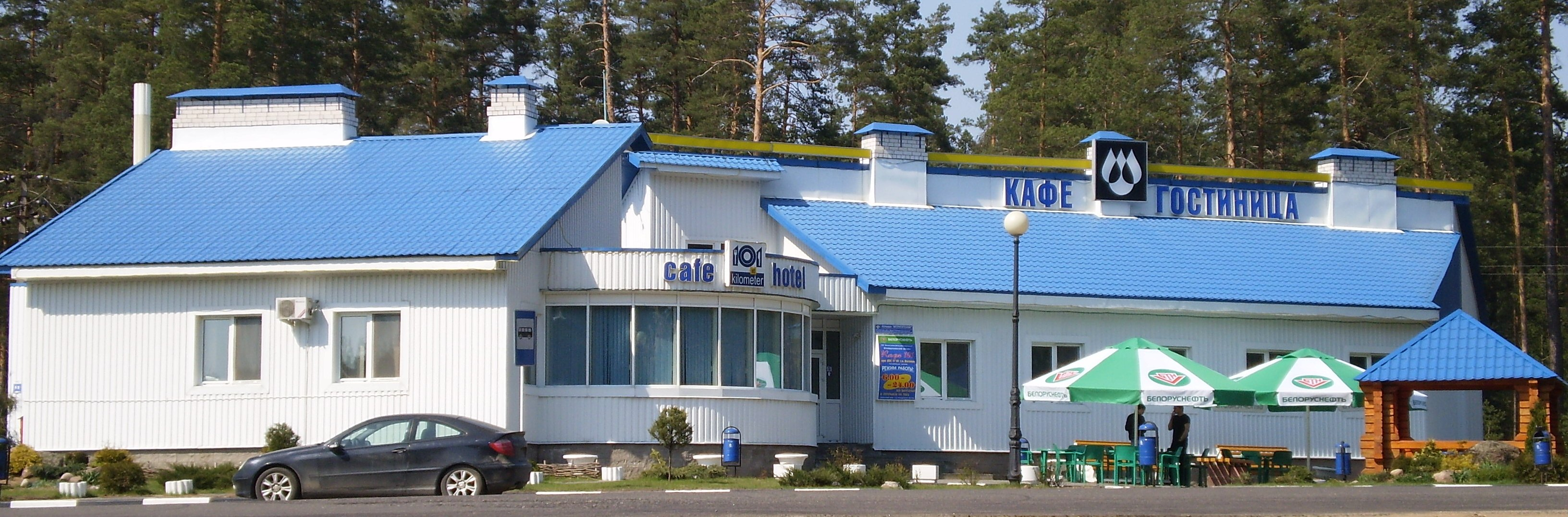
Motel "101 kilometre"

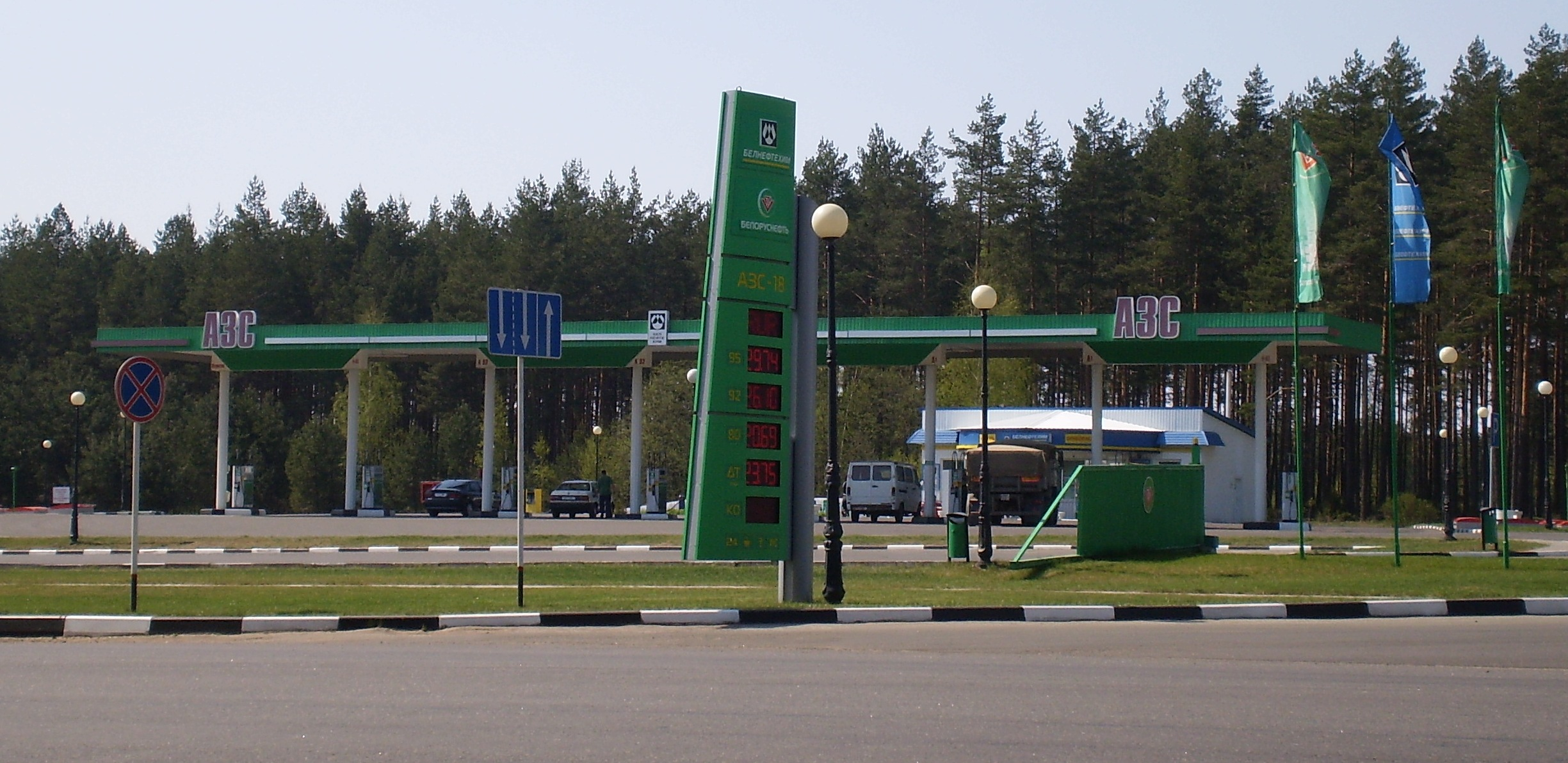
Gasoline station

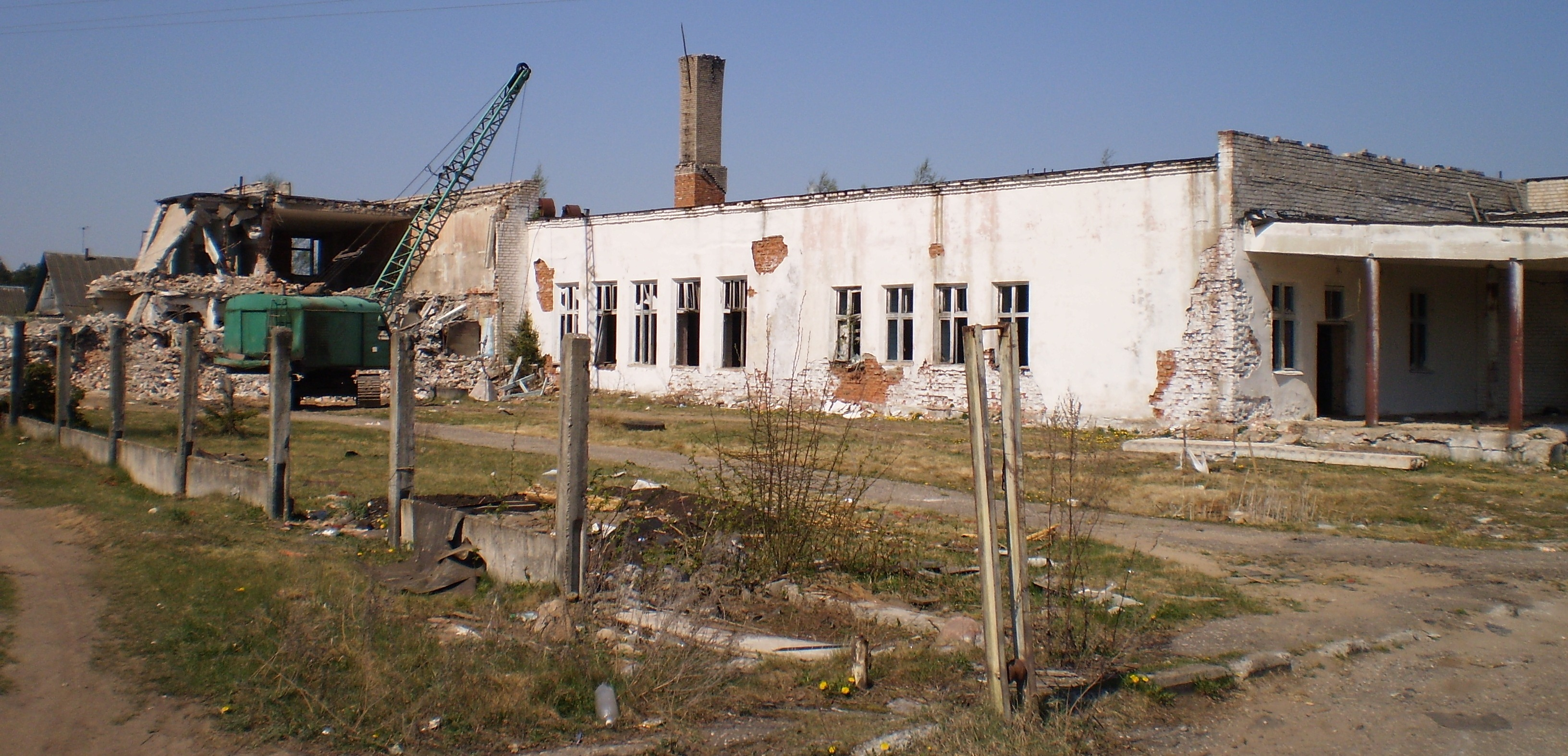
The bankrupt and ruined bakery

== Culture ==
The Museum of National Glory, the library, and a recreation centre provide for the cultural needs of residents and visitors. Along with 17,383 exhibits, including 13,783 on permanent display, since the beginning of the 1990s, the museum's courtyard has featured an Ilyushin Il-14 aircraft in commemoration of the Second World War struggle against the Germans. A memorial to the Lithuanian pilot who evacuated the wounded from the Begoml airdrome inscribed: "Here in 1942–1944 the guerrilla airdrome through which communication with "Continent", from here the beginnings the fighting way group of organizers of the guerrilla movement in Lithuania". . The monument was dedicated by Belarusian politician Pyotr Masherov in 1967, who in his opening speech noted the considerable contribution of Begomlians in the general struggle against fascists, and also spoke of the future; seeing a garden-city Begoml renamed Partisansk (city of partisanian glory).

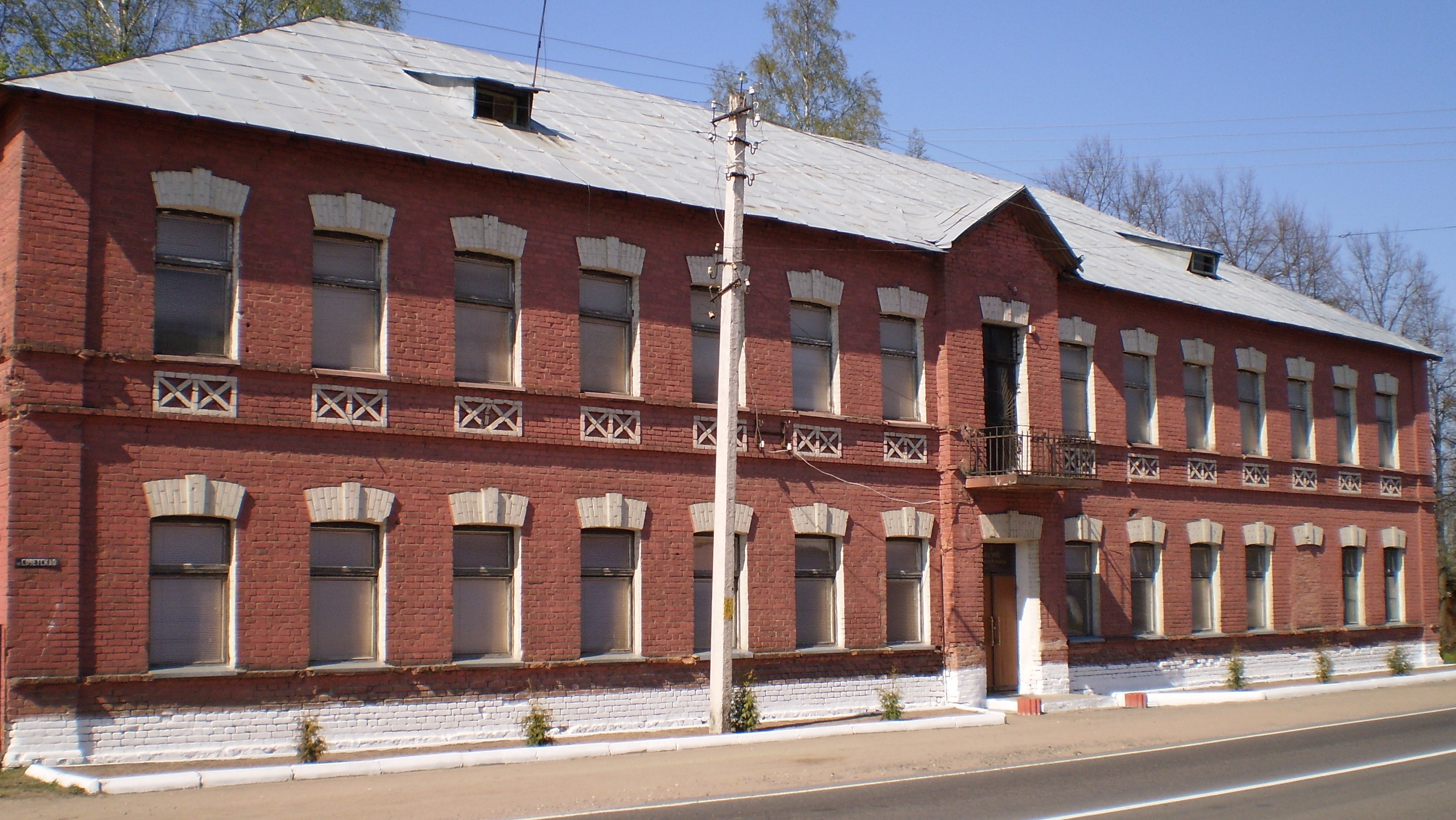
Begomlian Museum of national glory

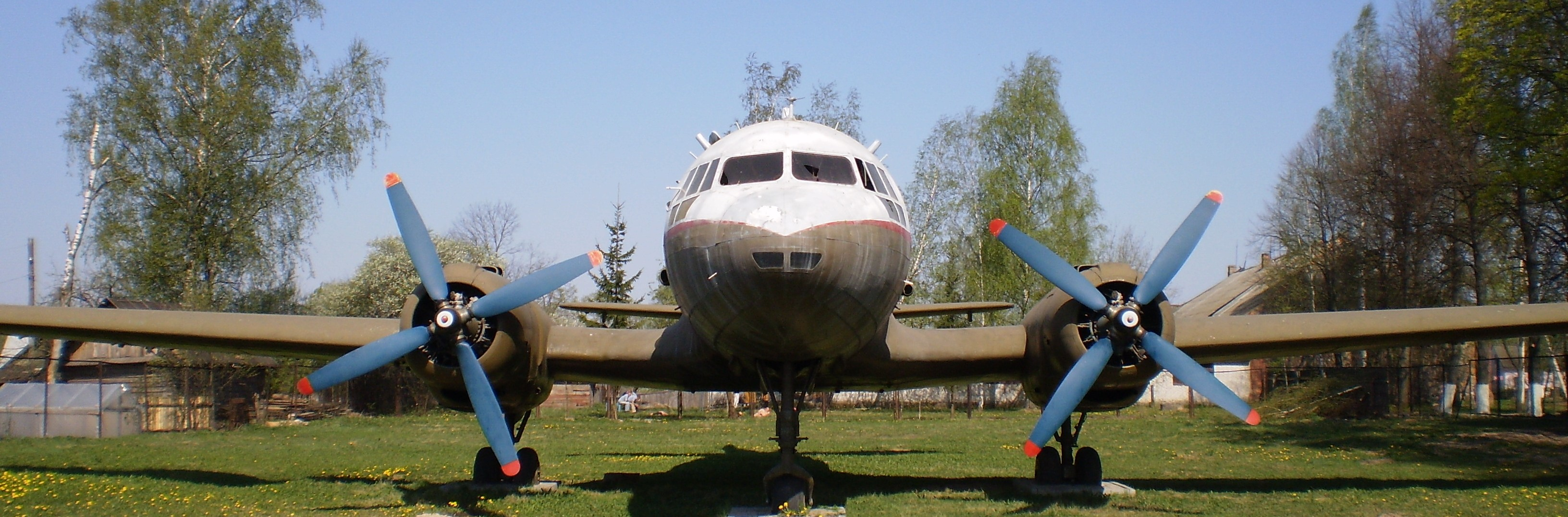
The plane Il-14 near the Museum of national glory

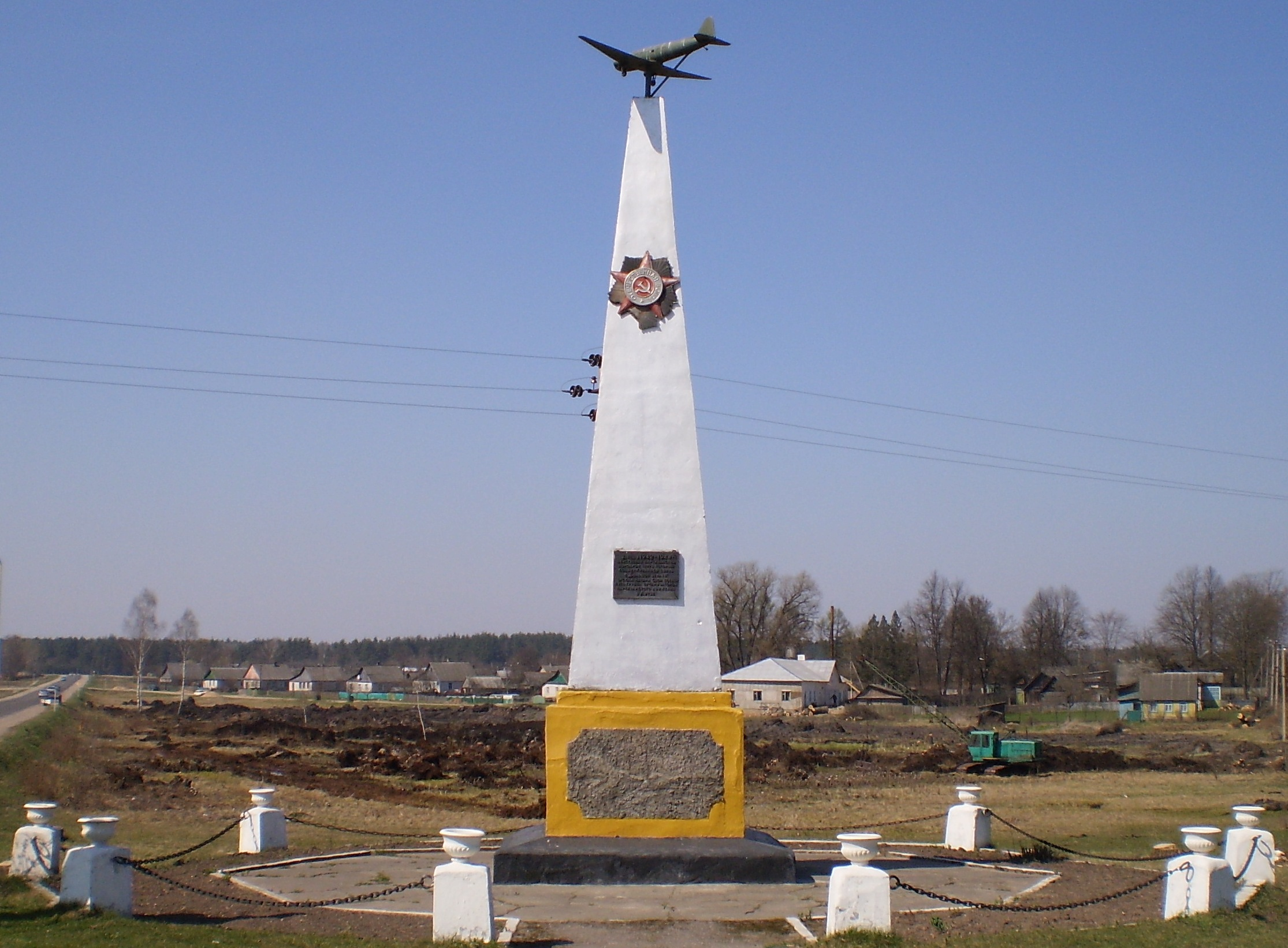
Monument to the Lithuanian pilot

== Education ==
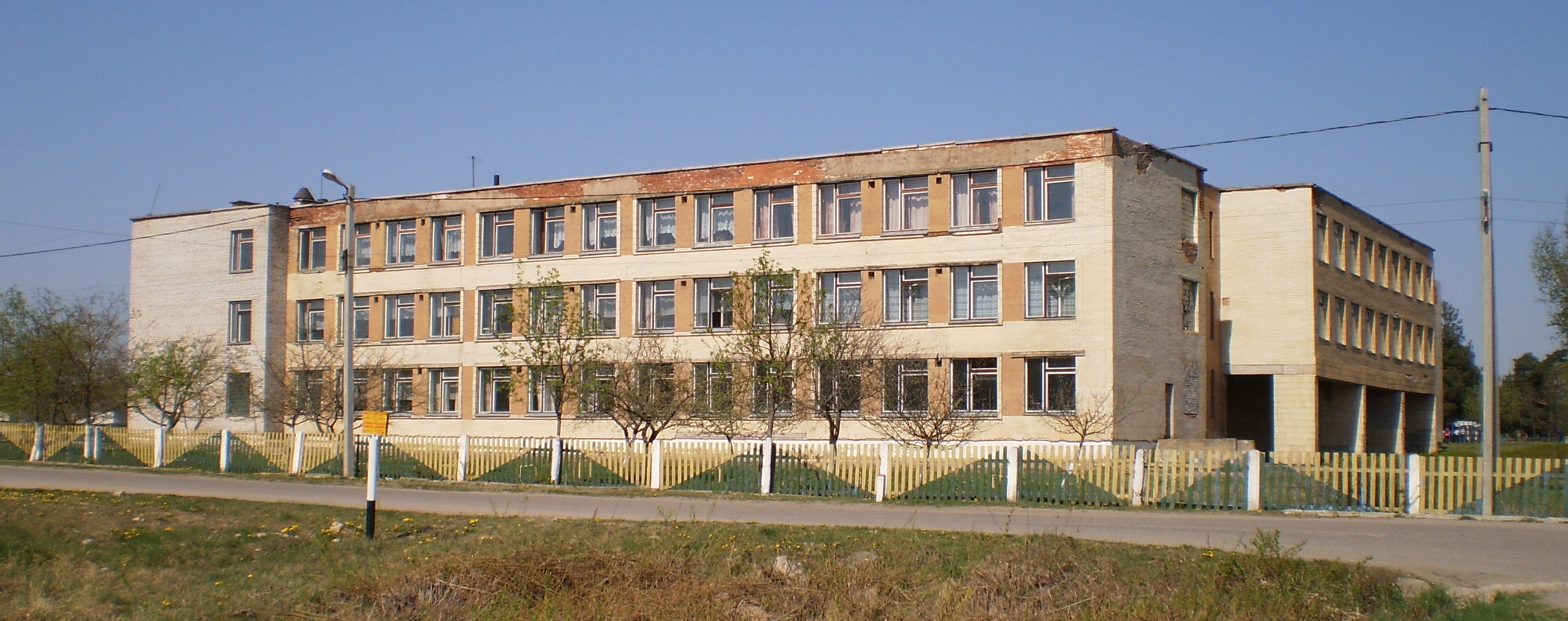
Begomlian high school

Of the several schools in Begoml. the general educational school is a government run high school for the Dokshitsy district. There town is also home to the Begomlian Children's Music School, a kindergarten with 127 places, and a boarding school for orphans.

== Population ==
The majority of the population of Begoml are Belarusians.

=== Population dynamics ===
| Year | Population |
|---|---|
| 1886 | 470 |
| 1924 | 781 |
| 1937 | 1 779 |
| 2004 | 3 000 |
| 2009 | 3 059 |

== Sights ==
- Distillery.
- Styop-stone.
- Akulinina's Pine.
- Dead Lake.
- Zhalniki.
- Barrows.

=== Begomlian Church of all Saints ===
The Begomlian Church of all Saints is a Russian style building constructed in the second half of 19th century. A distillery was established in the church after the Second World was but during the Soviet era the building was not maintained and has gradually become unfit for use. The back wall has been completely destroyed, and there is a considerable breach caused by a brick collapse in the right wall. Currently, the church is not undergoing restoration despite its status as a protected state historical monument. In Yan Balzunkevich's "Christian Churches of Belarus" collection of photos printed in 2000, the caption of a picture of the Church of all Saints states that it no longer exists. This is likely to become a reality, despite church reconstruction being one of main priorities of the Dokshitsy district executive committee. Today, church services are held in the former accident ward of Begomlian Region Hospital.

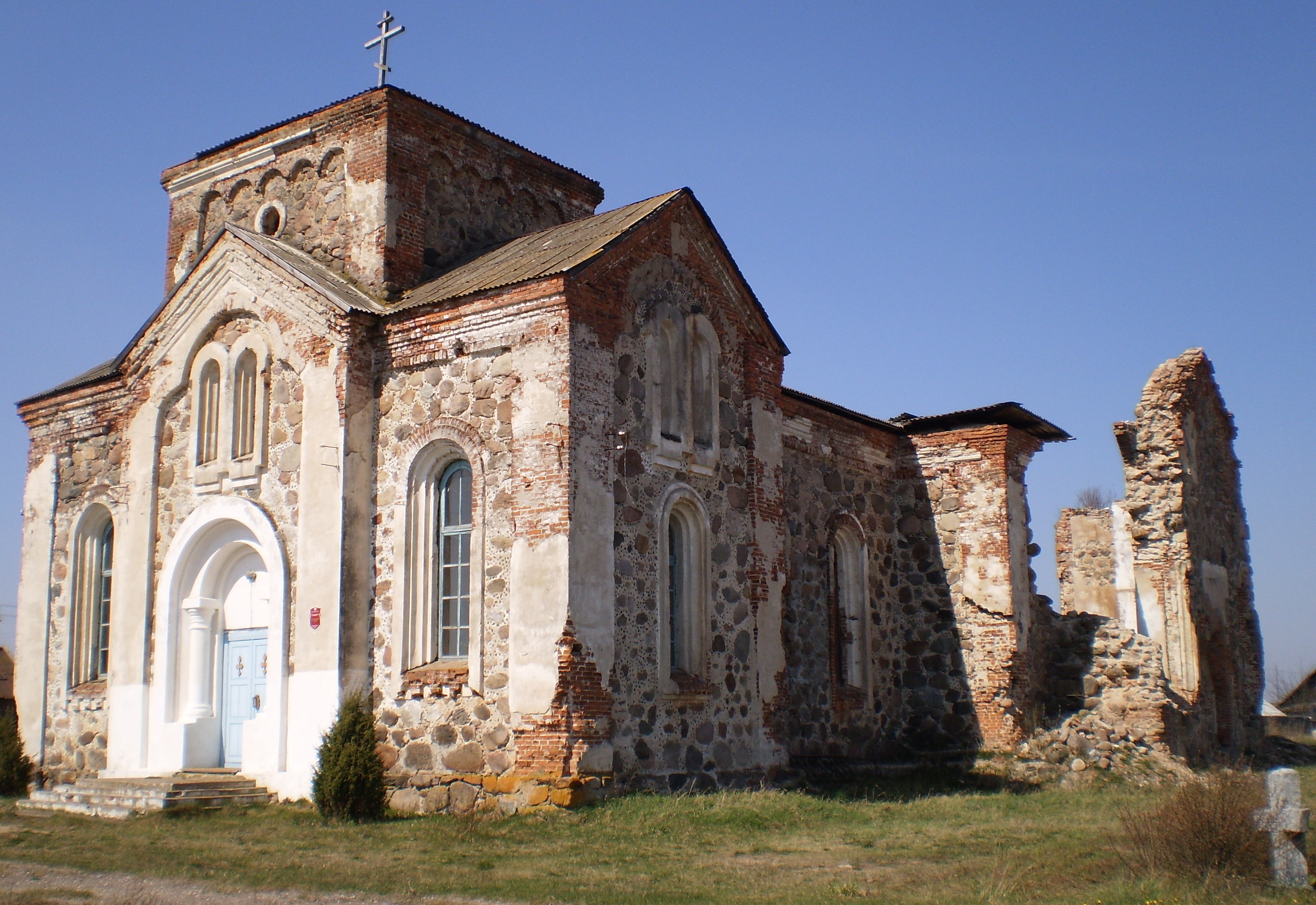
Begomlian church of all Saints

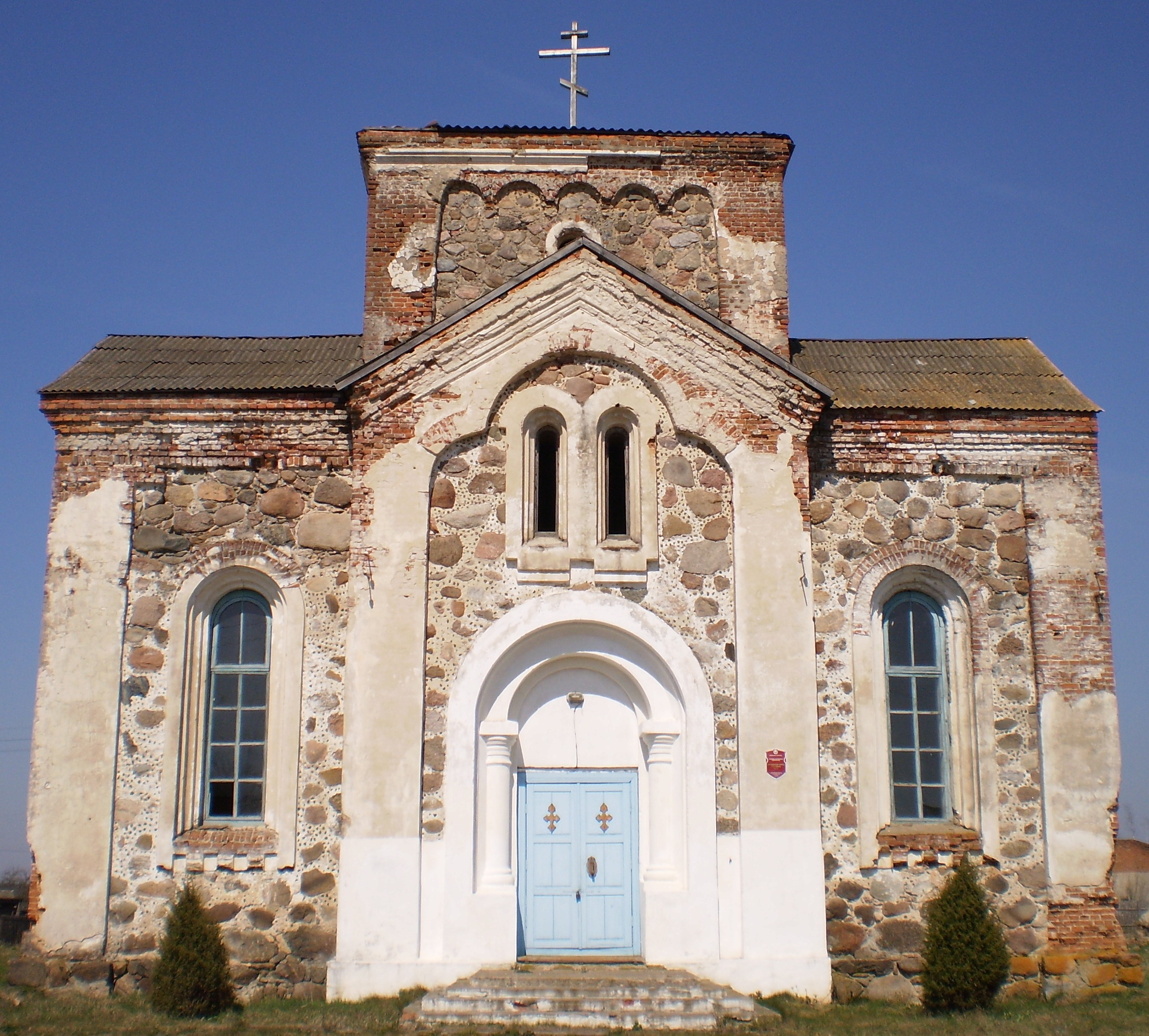
Facade of Begomlian church of all Saints

== Gallery ==
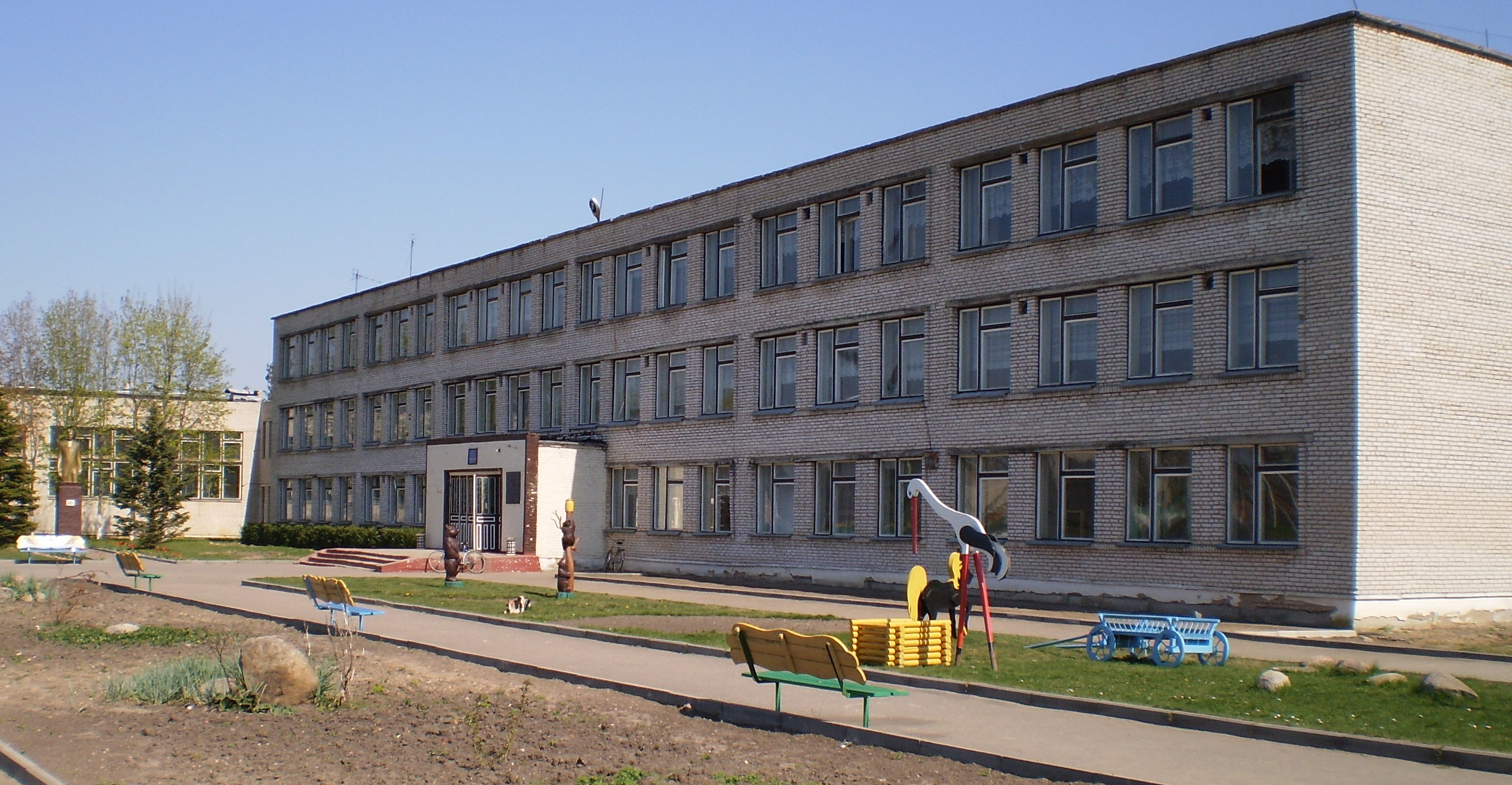
Begomlian school courtyard

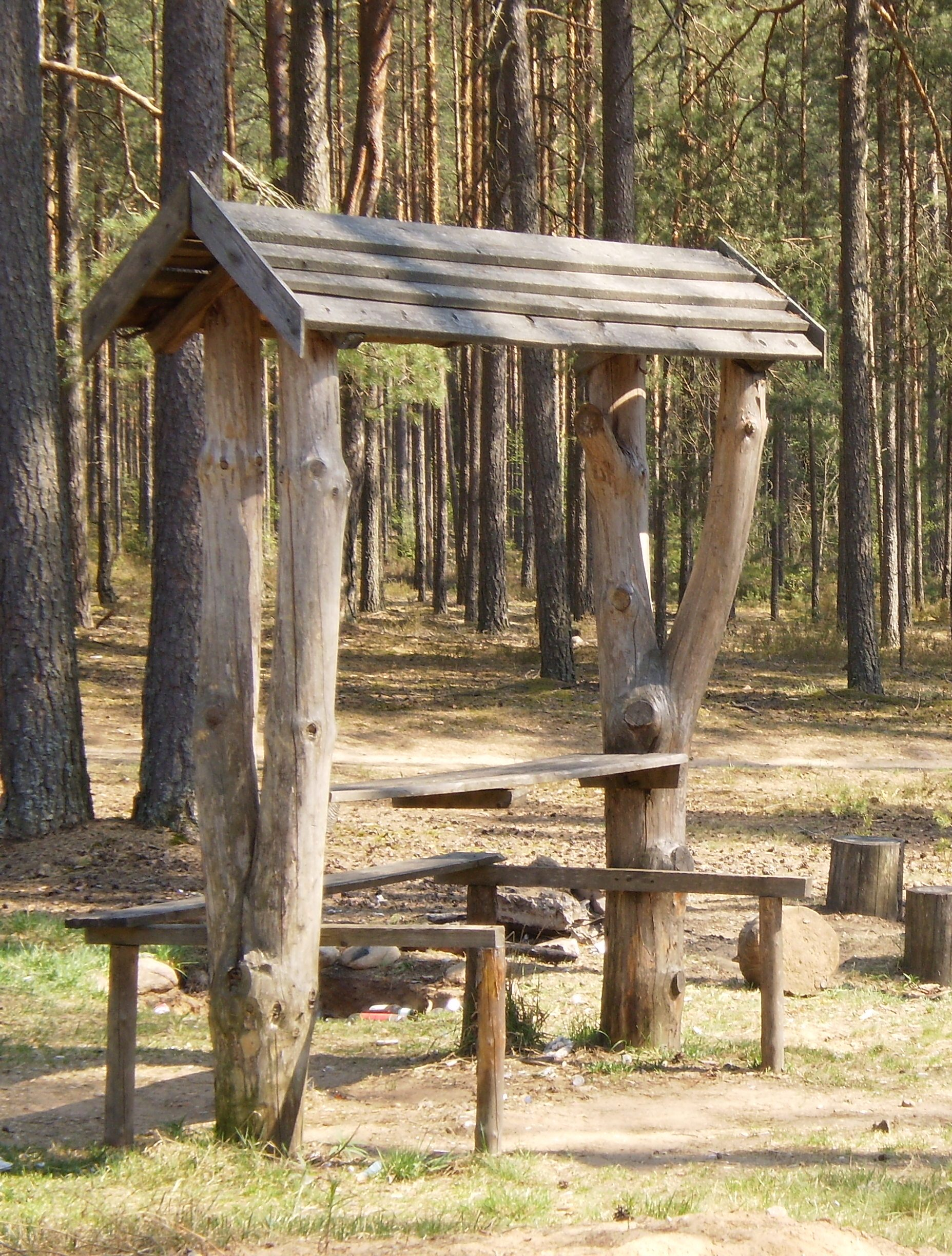
Begomlian forest

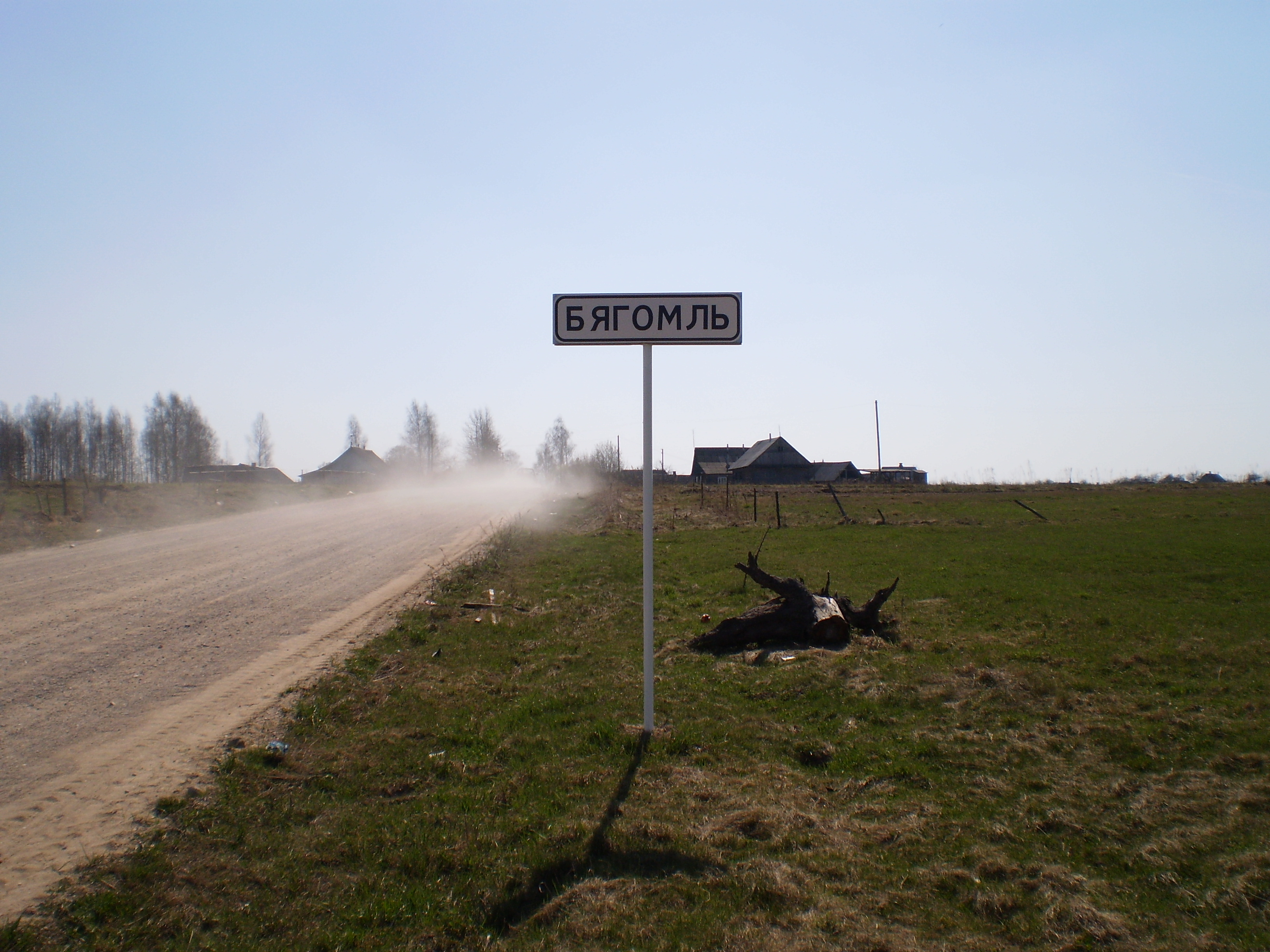
Road view from Berasneuka village

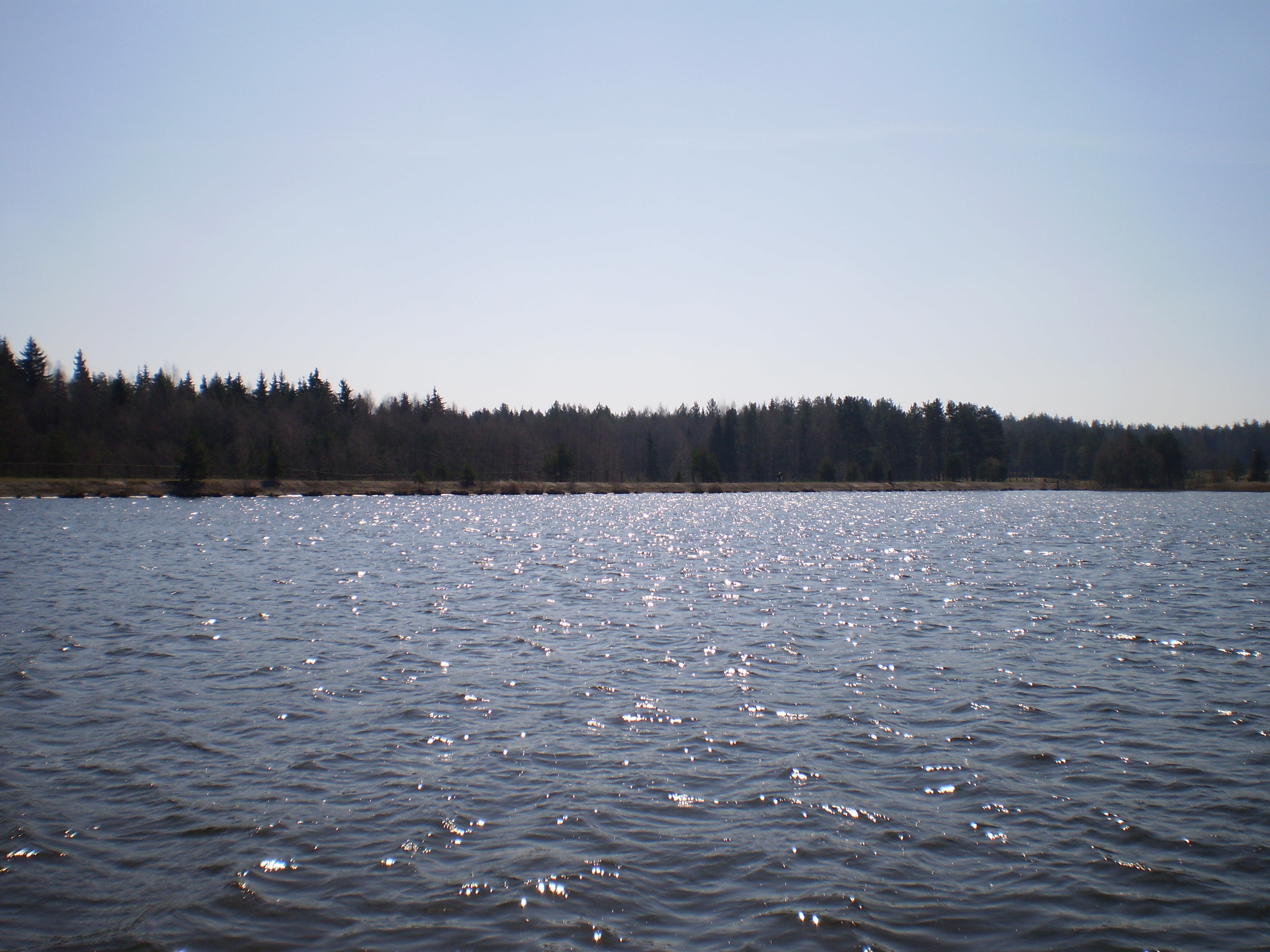
Budachi lake near sanatorium "Borovoe"

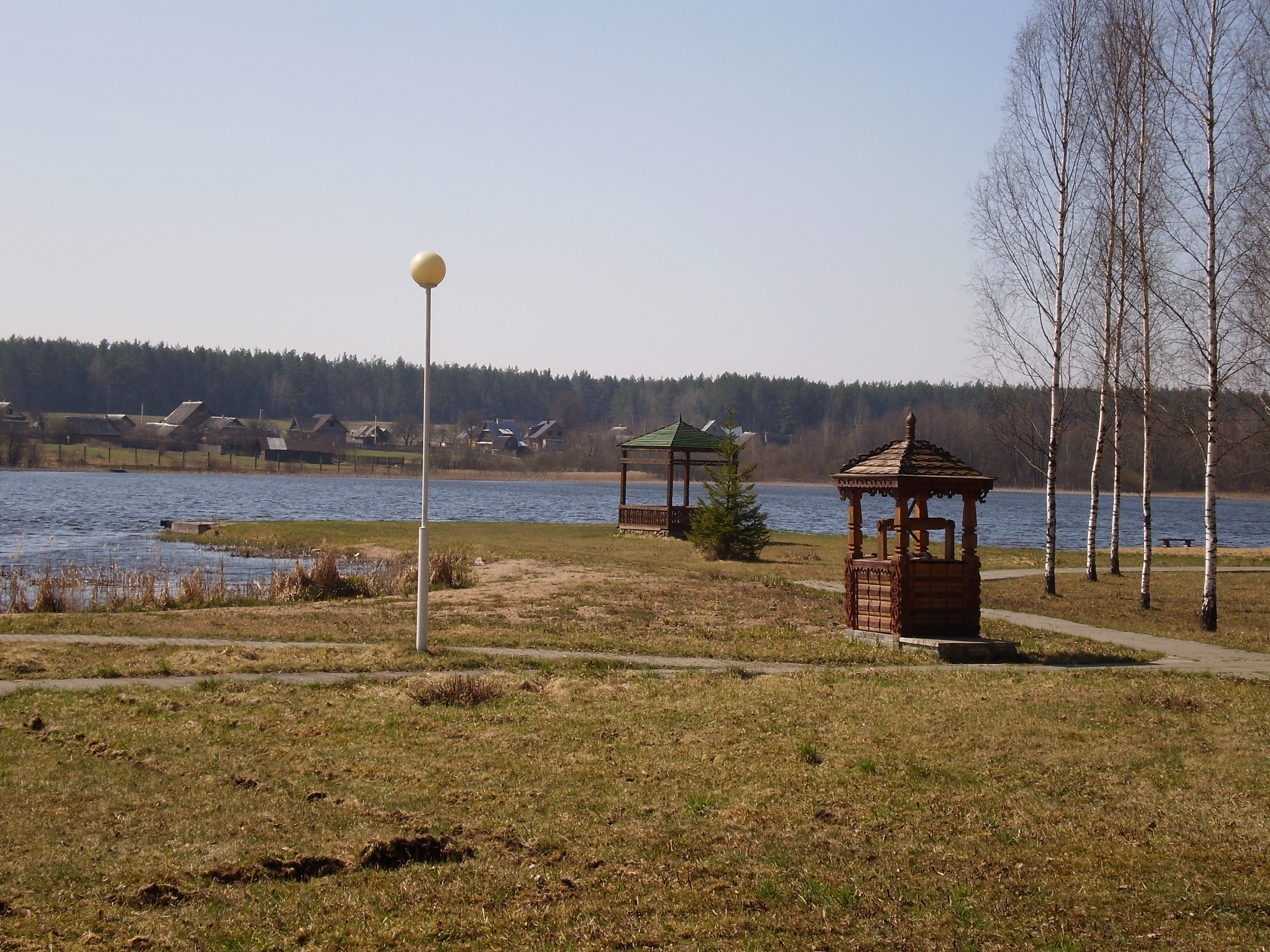
View from sanatorium "Borovoe"

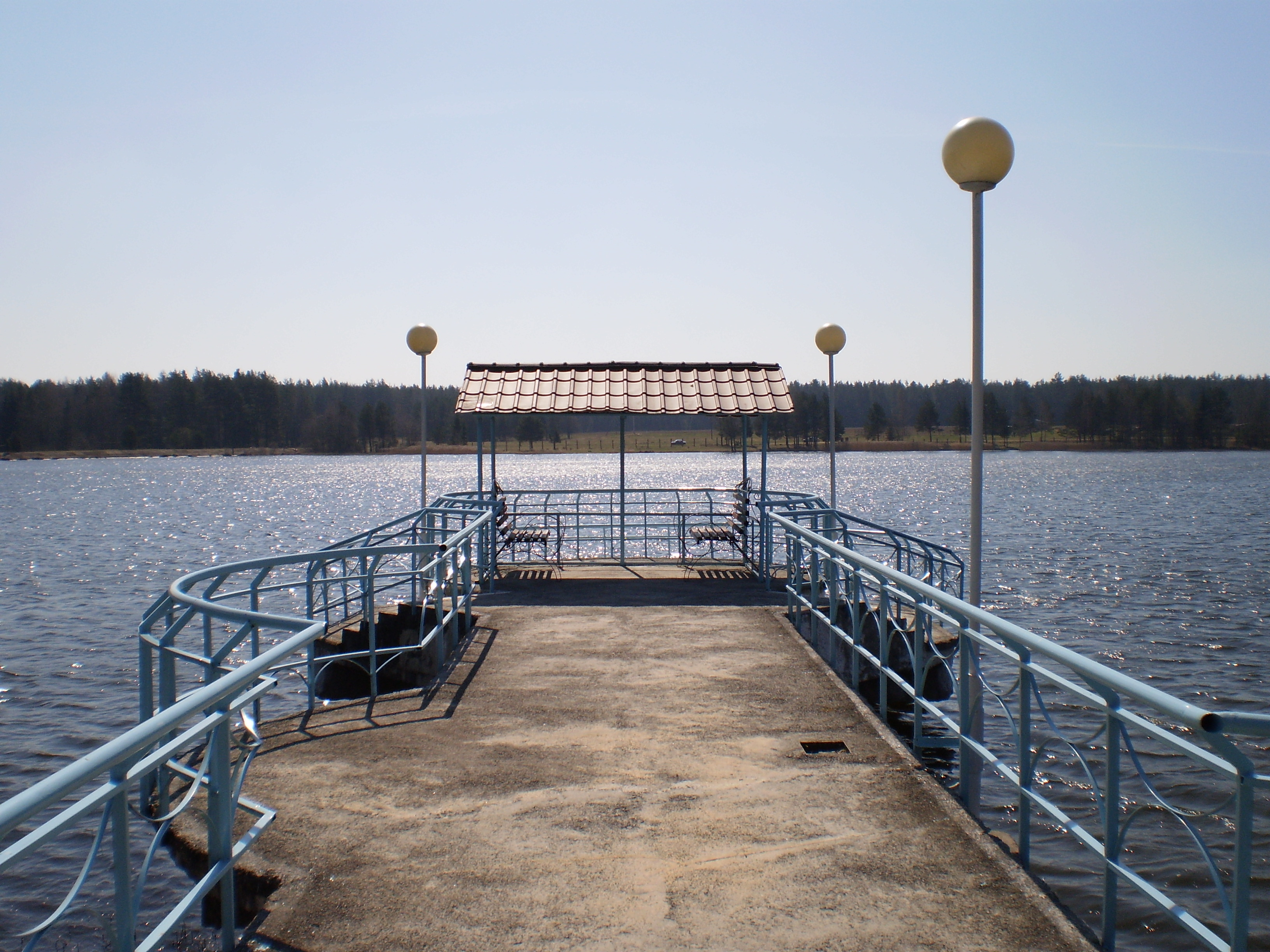
Pier on Budachi lake

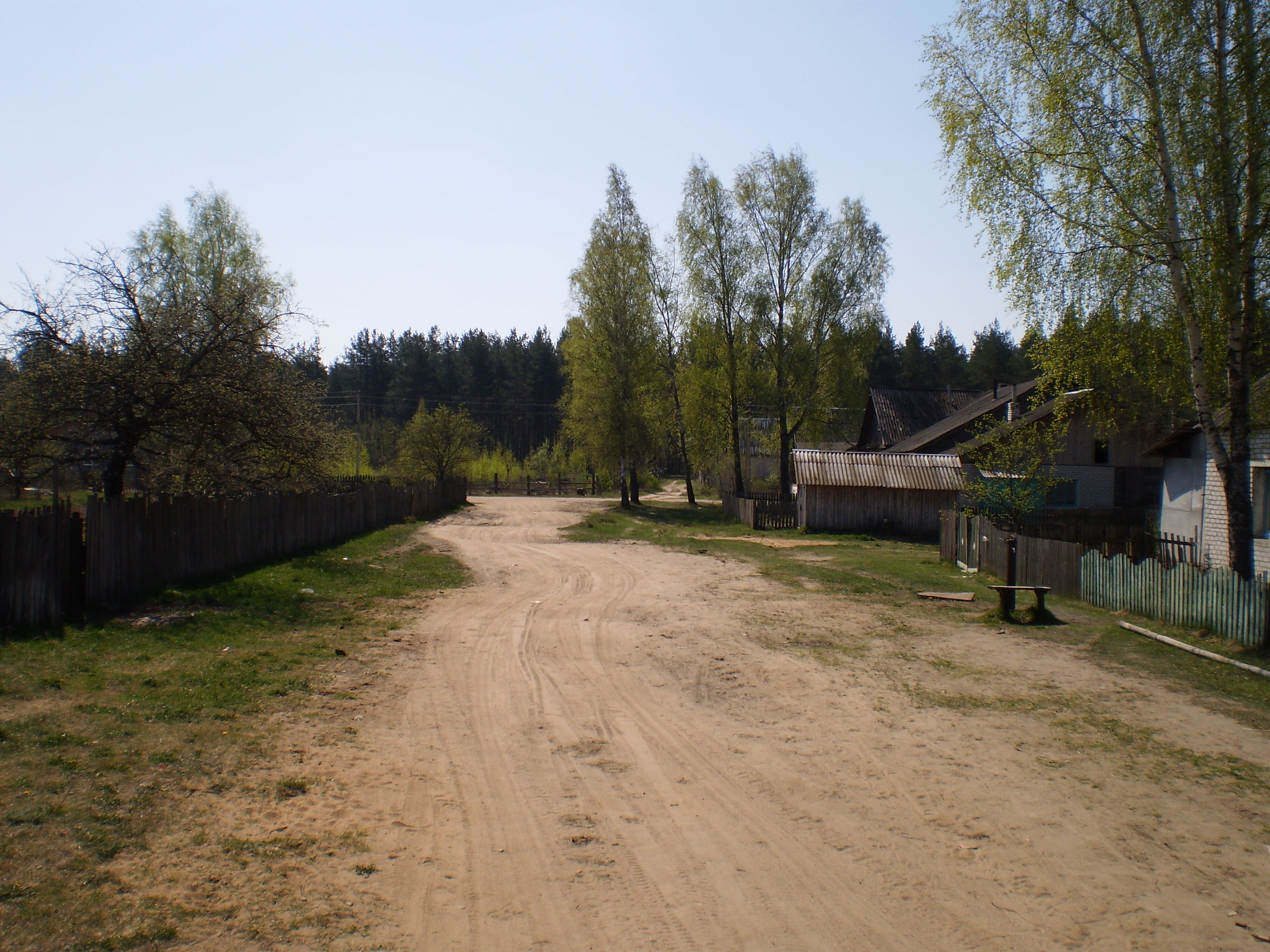
Begomlian suburb
