= Kaptsyuhi =

Kaptsyuhi Капцюгі (Belarusian)
- Village
- Location within Belarus
- Coordinates: 54°53′46″N 27°56′50″E
- Country: Belarus
- Region: Vitebsk Region
- District: Dokshytsy District
- Elevation: 139 m (456 ft)
- Time zone: UTC+3

Kaptsyuhi (Belarusian: Капцюгі, romanized: Kapciuhi; Russian: Коптюги, romanized: Koptyugi) is a village in Dokshytsy District, Vitebsk Region, Belarus. It is part of Byerazino selsoviet.

== Sources ==
- "Koptyush Map: Satellite Images of Koptyush". MapLandia.com.
- "Maps, Weather, and Airports for Koptyush, Belarus". Falling Rain Genomics, Inc.
