= Dokshytsy =

Dokshytsy Докшыцы (Belarusian) Докшицы (Russian)
- Town
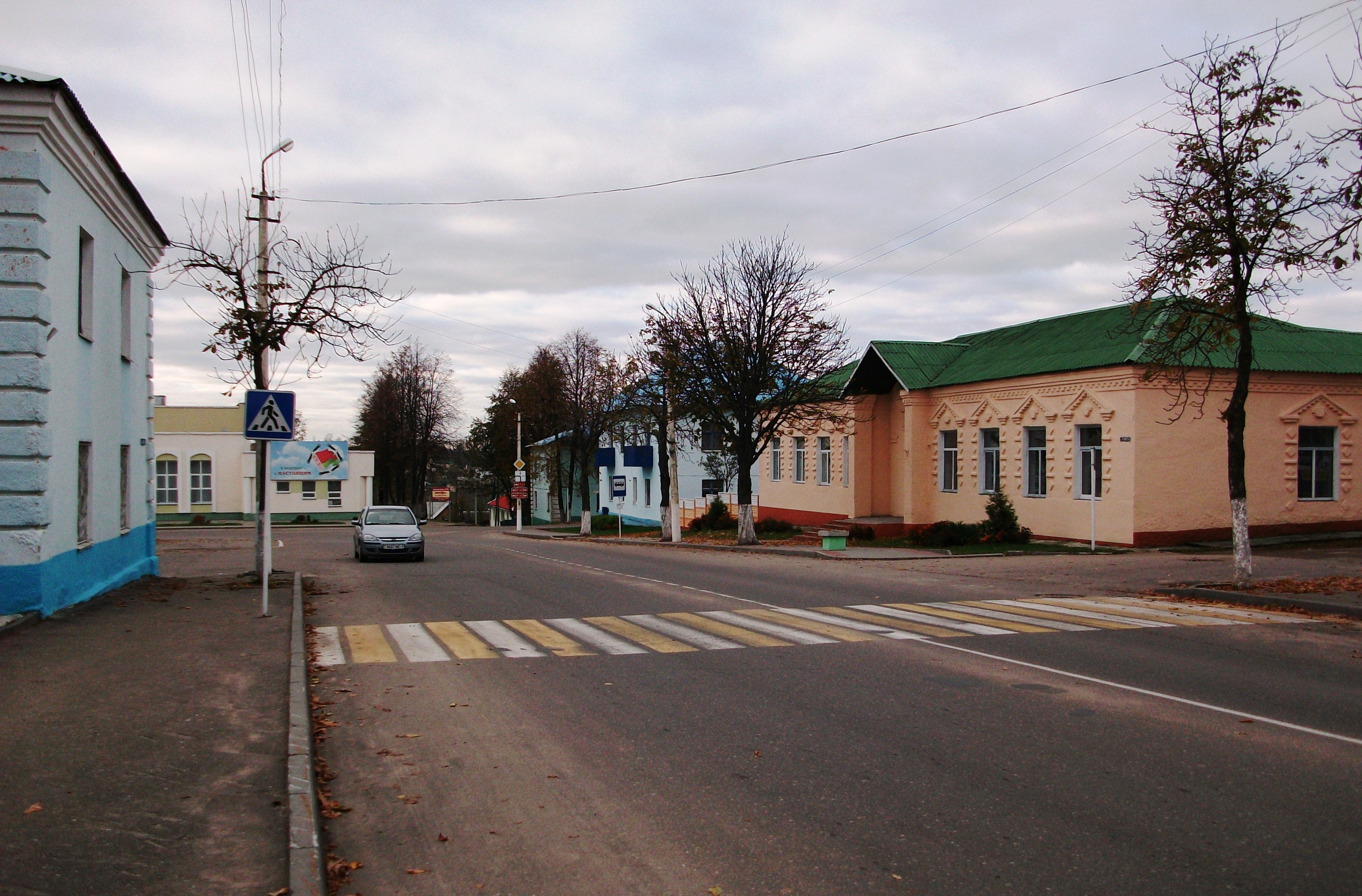
- In the center of town

- Flag Coat of arms

- Location within Belarus
- Coordinates: 54°54′0″N 27°46′0″E
- Country: Belarus
- Region: Vitebsk Region
- District: Dokshytsy District

Area
  - Total: 9.42 km^{2} (3.64 sq mi)

Population (2025)
  - Total: 6,601
  - Density: 701/km^{2} (1,810/sq mi)
- Time zone: UTC+3
- Postal code: 211722
- Area code: +375 2157
- Website: Official website

Dokshytsy or Dokshitsy (Note: Belarusian: Докшыцы, romanized: Dokšycy; Russian: Докшицы, romanized: Dokshitsy; Yiddish: דאקשיץ, romanized: Dokshitz; Lithuanian: Dokšica.) is a town in Vitebsk Region, Belarus. It serves as the administrative center of Dokshytsy District. It is located approximately 200 km (124.27 mi) southwest of Vitebsk and one kilometer from the source of the Berezina River. Its population in 2010 was 6,600. As of 2025, it has a population of 6,601. The town has a significant Chassidic history.

== History ==
The town is first mentioned in a document of Grand Duke Vytautas dated 1407 which refers to tributaries called doxyczahe. Within the Grand Duchy of Lithuania, Dokshytsy was part of Minsk Voivodeship.

In 1793, Dokshitsy was acquired by the Russian Empire as a result of the Second Partition of Poland and incorporated into the Minsk Governorate; in 1795 it was briefly made a city before losing a portion of its territory and reverting to village status two years later. During the War of 1812 it was overrun and destroyed by the French.

In 1897 the population was 2,762 which by 1925 had grown to approximately 3,000 souls.

From 1921 until 1939, Dokshytsy (Dokszyce) was part of the Second Polish Republic. In the 1921 census, 48.7% people declared Jewish nationality, 37.3% declared Polish nationality, 11.8% declared Belarusian nationality, and 1.4% declared Tatar nationality.

=== World War II ===
On 17 September 1939, Dokshytsy was occupied by the Red Army and, on 14 November 1939, incorporated into the Byelorussian SSR.

From 9 July 1941 until 2 July 1944, Dokshytsy was occupied by Nazi Germany and administered as a part of the Generalbezirk Weißruthenien of Reichskommissariat Ostland. The Germans destroyed the town and set up a military garrison.

Jews of the city were gathered in a ghetto on 30 September 1941. Its border ran from the bridge to Głeboker Street, to the front side of the synagogue courtyard, then down Polotsker Street to Garden’s Beer Hall and the Berezena River, then included the market place up to the side of the synagogue courtyard. It was surrounded by boards, fences, and barbed wire and guarded by the local police. The resettlement took place on November 30, 1941, on a bitterly cold and snowy day. The town’s 3,000 Jews were given only half an hour to assemble on the marketplace with all their belongings. The authorities then gave them only three hours to move into the ghetto. Much of their property, including livestock, was confiscated or stolen by the local police during the resettlement. The ghetto area was very overcrowded— between three and four families had to share a single dwelling. However, some of the houses vacated by Jews outside stood empty, due to the high proportion of Jews in the town. In April 1942, hundreds of young people were sent from the ghetto to a labor camp in Glambukia. During this period an underground organization was established in the ghetto, headed by Joseph Shapira.

On 29 May 1942, 2,600 Jews were executed on a site outside the city.

On 2 July 1944, Dokshytsy was re-occupied by the Red Army, and finally annexed from Poland the following year. The town resumed its status as a part of the Byelorussian SSR. Since 1991, it has belonged to the independent Republic of Belarus.

After World War II, the Jewish community was never re-established.

== Climate ==
Climate data for Dokshytsy (1991–2020)
Month	Jan	Feb	Mar	Apr	May	Jun	Jul	Aug	Sep	Oct	Nov	Dec	Year
Record high °C (°F)	3.8 (38.8)	4.5 (40.1)	11.5 (52.7)	21.7 (71.1)	26.3 (79.3)	28.5 (83.3)	30.0 (86.0)	29.5 (85.1)	24.7 (76.5)	17.7 (63.9)	10.2 (50.4)	5.3 (41.5)	30.0 (86.0)
Mean daily maximum °C (°F)	−2.5 (27.5)	−1.6 (29.1)	3.5 (38.3)	11.9 (53.4)	18.0 (64.4)	21.5 (70.7)	23.5 (74.3)	22.5 (72.5)	16.8 (62.2)	9.6 (49.3)	3.1 (37.6)	−1.0 (30.2)	10.4 (50.7)
Daily mean °C (°F)	−4.7 (23.5)	−4.4 (24.1)	−0.3 (31.5)	6.7 (44.1)	12.5 (54.5)	16.2 (61.2)	18.2 (64.8)	17.0 (62.6)	11.8 (53.2)	6.1 (43.0)	1.0 (33.8)	−2.9 (26.8)	6.4 (43.5)
Mean daily minimum °C (°F)	−6.9 (19.6)	−7.1 (19.2)	−3.6 (25.5)	2.0 (35.6)	6.8 (44.2)	10.6 (51.1)	12.7 (54.9)	11.7 (53.1)	7.6 (45.7)	3.3 (37.9)	−0.8 (30.6)	−4.7 (23.5)	2.6 (36.7)
Record low °C (°F)	−20.9 (−5.6)	−19.8 (−3.6)	−13.7 (7.3)	−4.8 (23.4)	−0.5 (31.1)	4.0 (39.2)	7.4 (45.3)	5.2 (41.4)	0.5 (32.9)	−4.8 (23.4)	−10.0 (14.0)	−14.9 (5.2)	−20.9 (−5.6)
Average precipitation mm (inches)	25.9 (1.02)	24.4 (0.96)	23.7 (0.93)	23.5 (0.93)	35.8 (1.41)	43.9 (1.73)	50.6 (1.99)	42.4 (1.67)	33.5 (1.32)	35.7 (1.41)	29.2 (1.15)	28.1 (1.11)	396.7 (15.62)
Average precipitation days (≥ 1.0 mm)	8.4	8.3	7.2	6.1	8.2	8.7	8.8	8.0	7.3	9.1	8.1	8.9	97.1
Source: NOAA

== Gallery ==
Modern photos

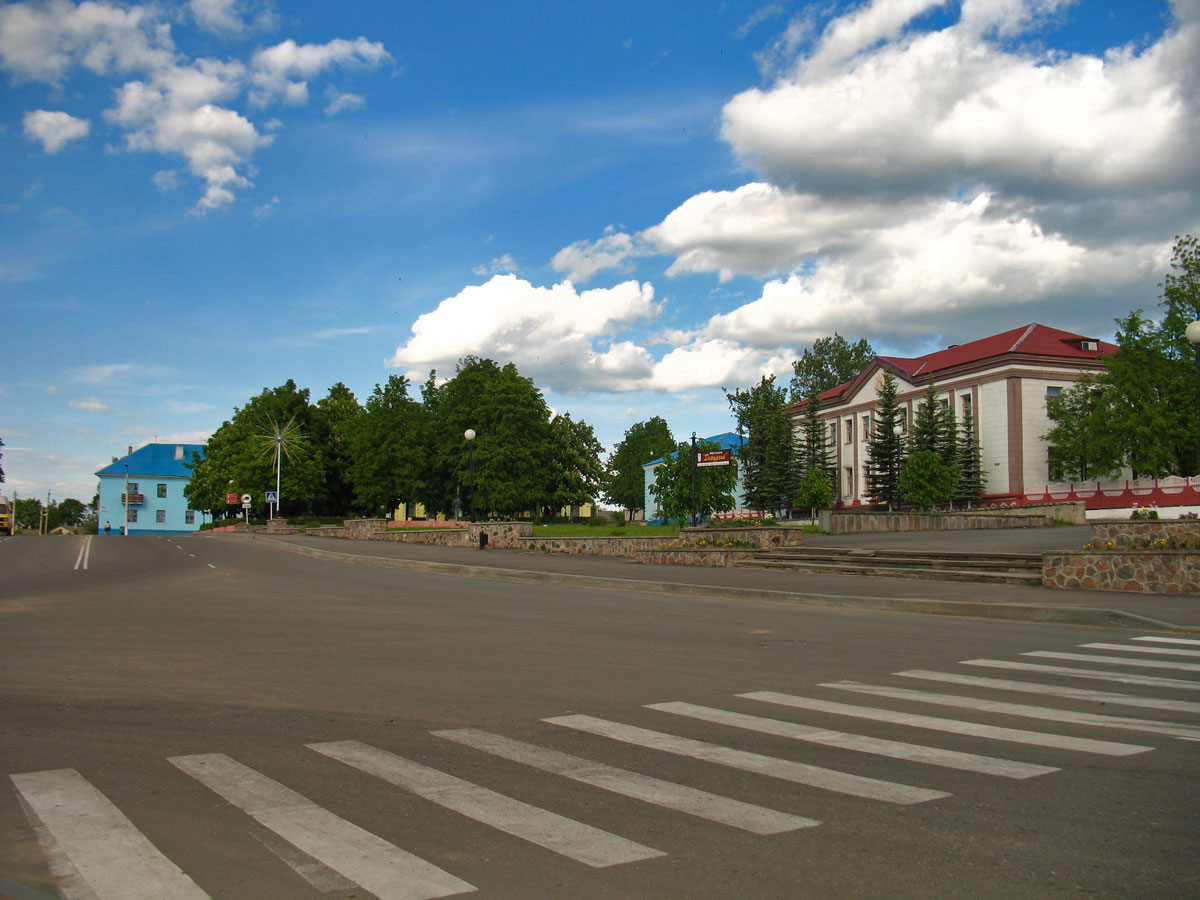
City center

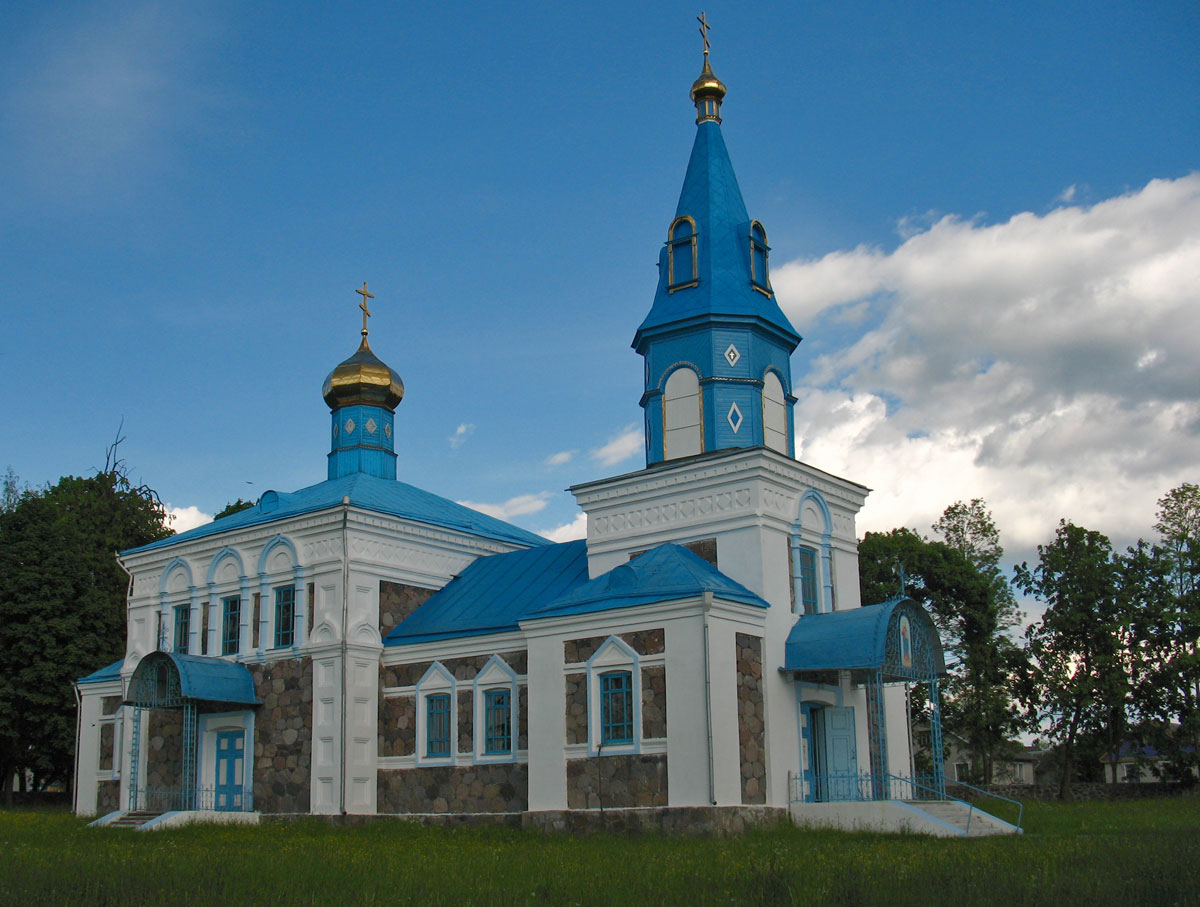
Church of the Intercession of Our Lady in Dokšycy

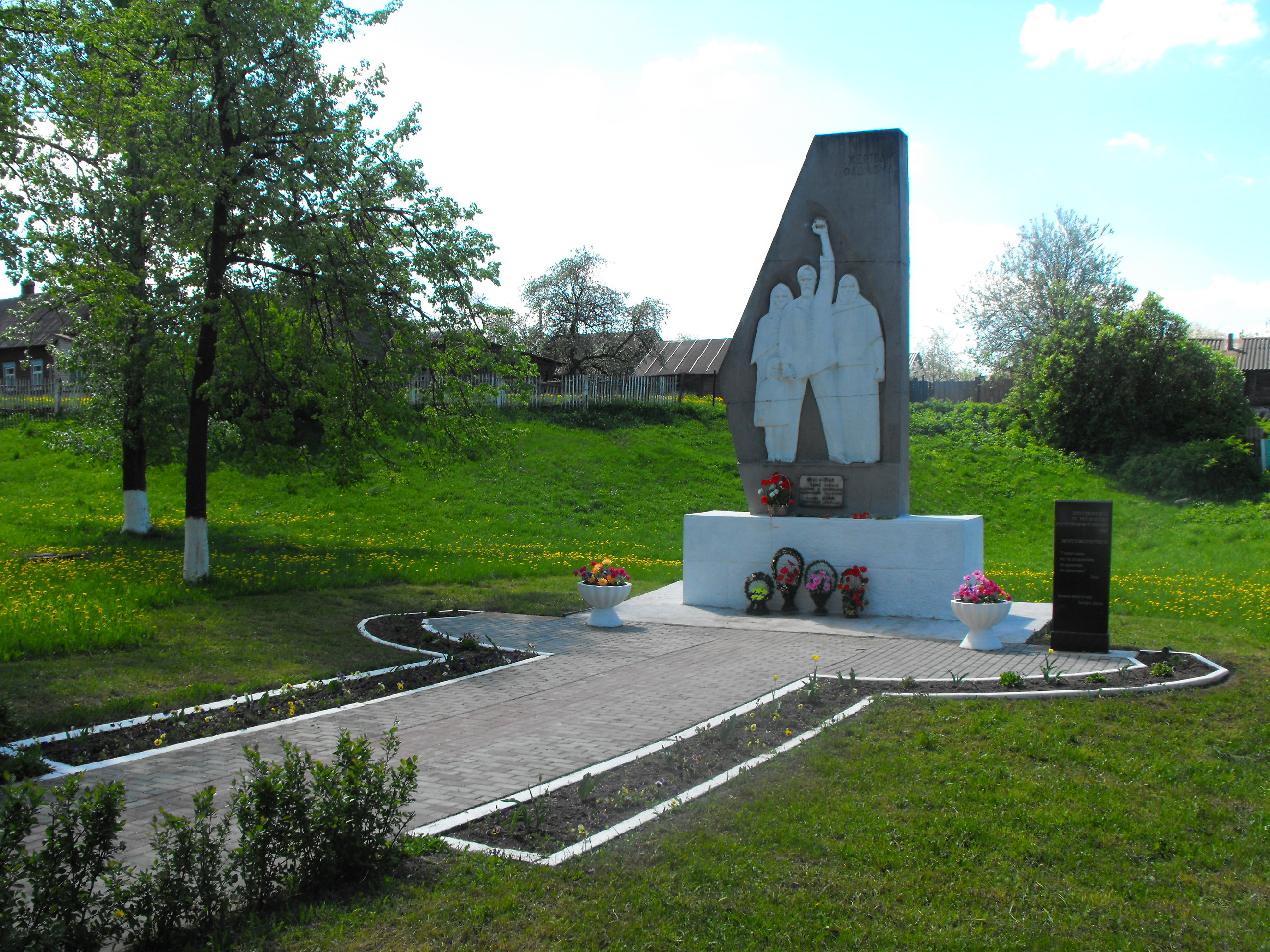
Memorial for persecuted Dokshytsy ghetto Jews

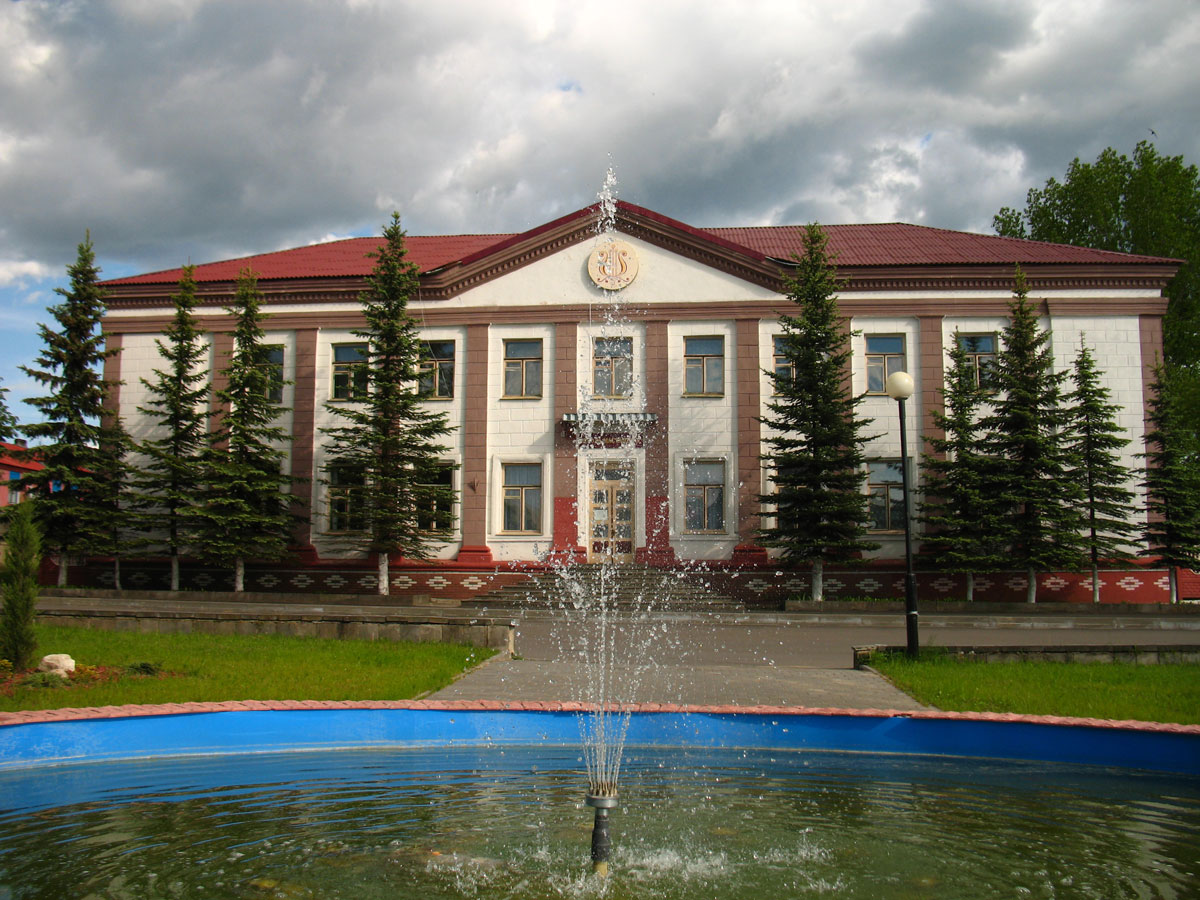
Dokshytsy art school
Old photos

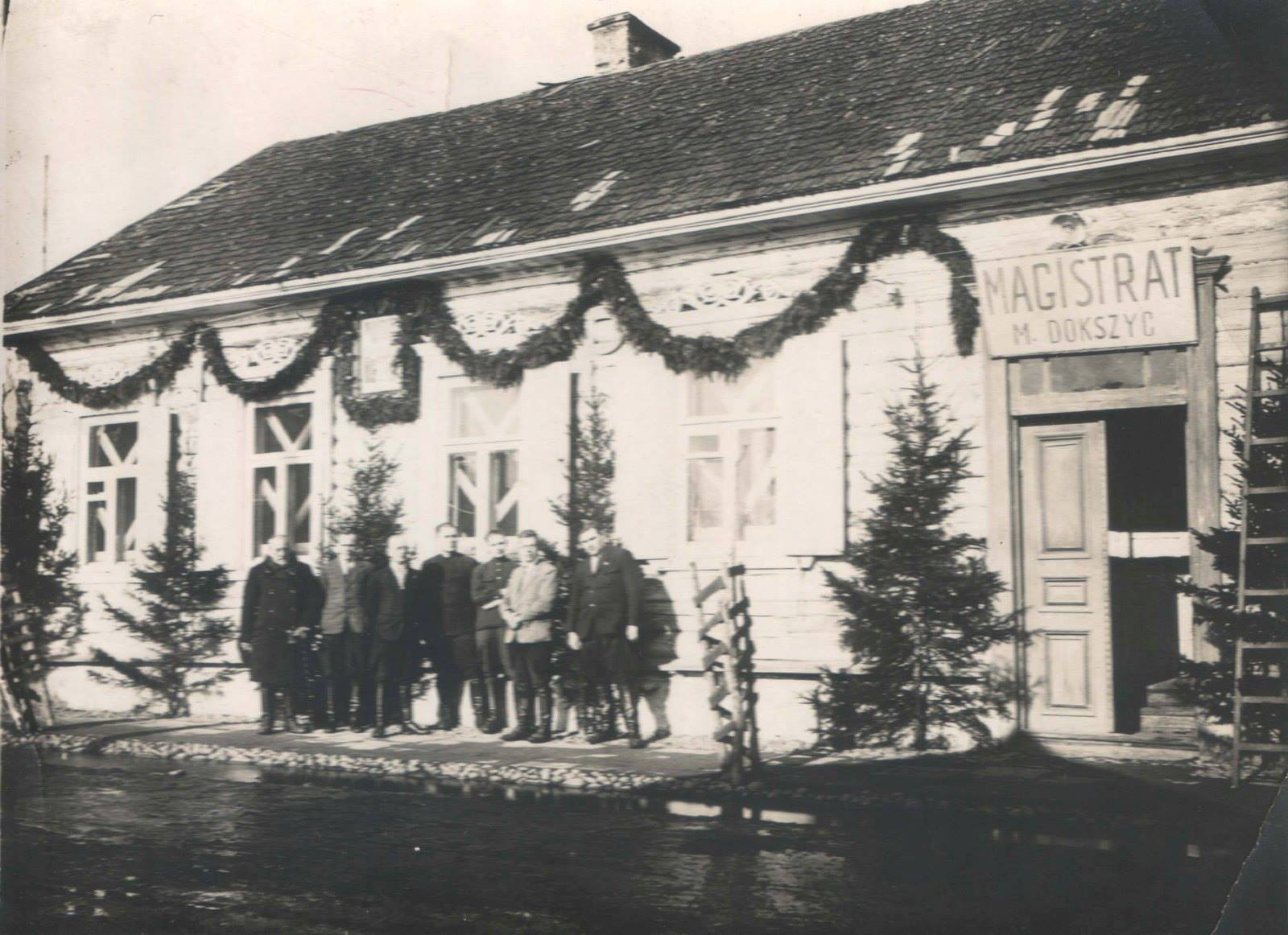
Dokshytsy Magistrat

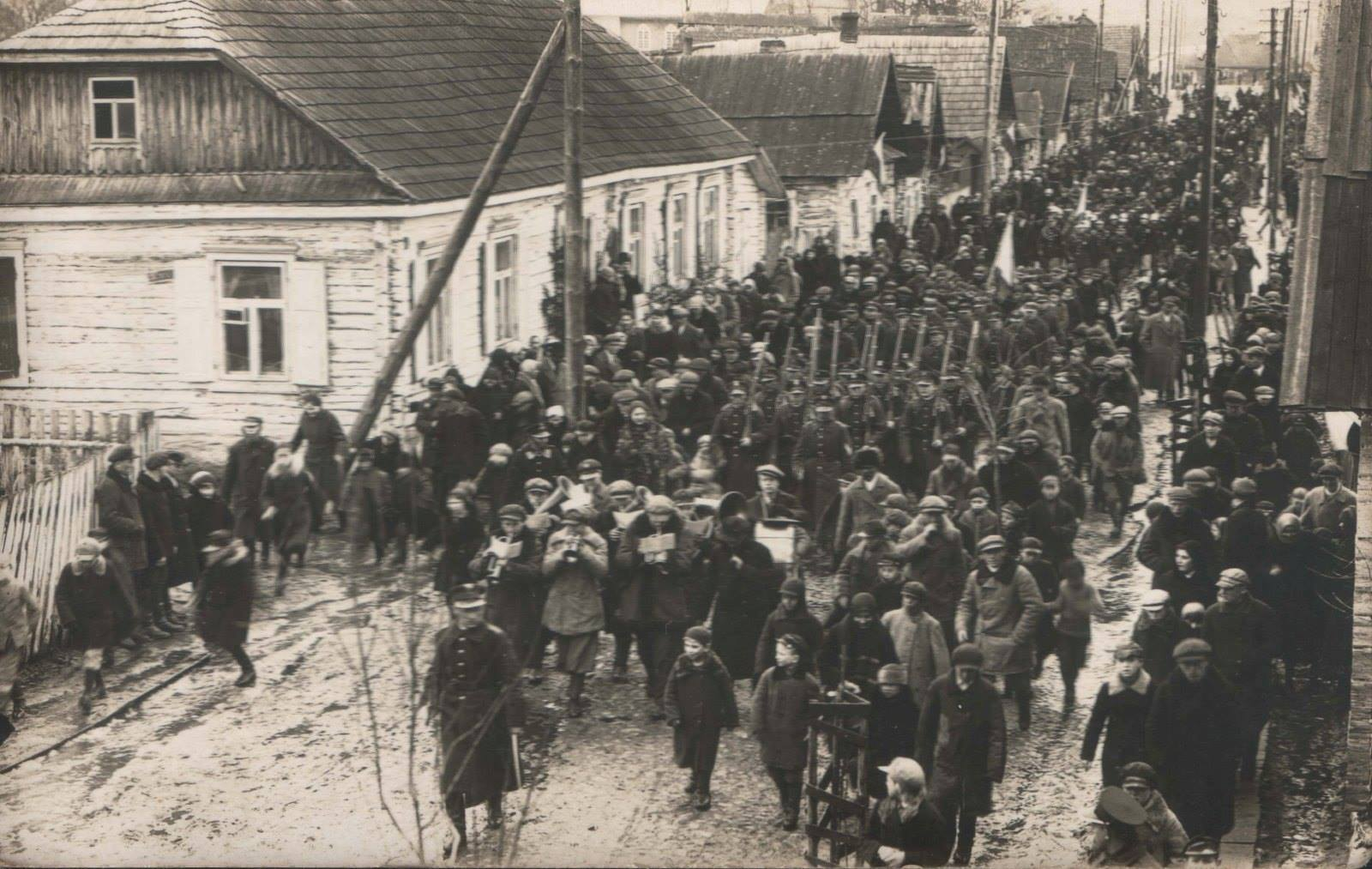
Parade

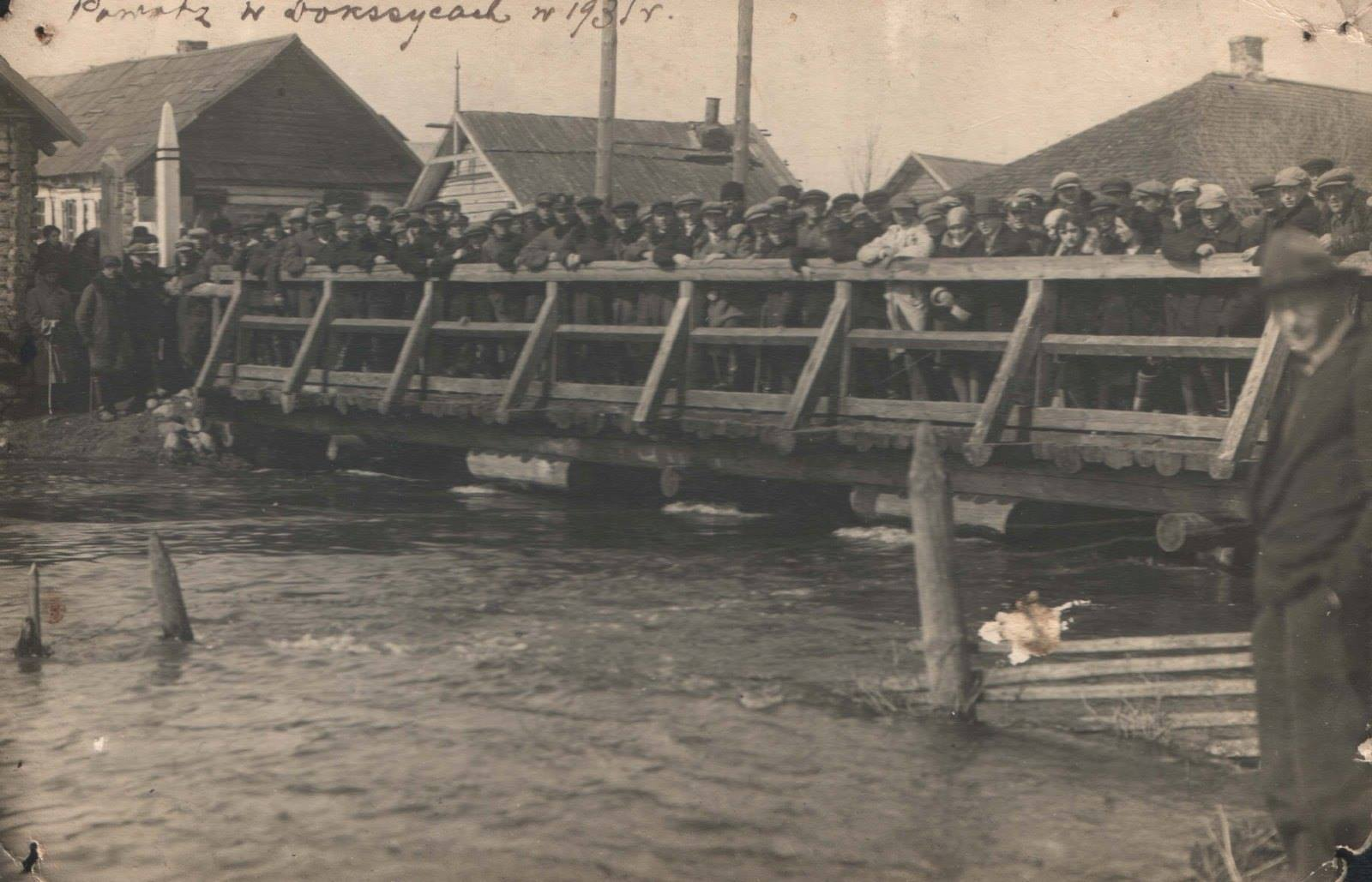
Bridge over Berezina river

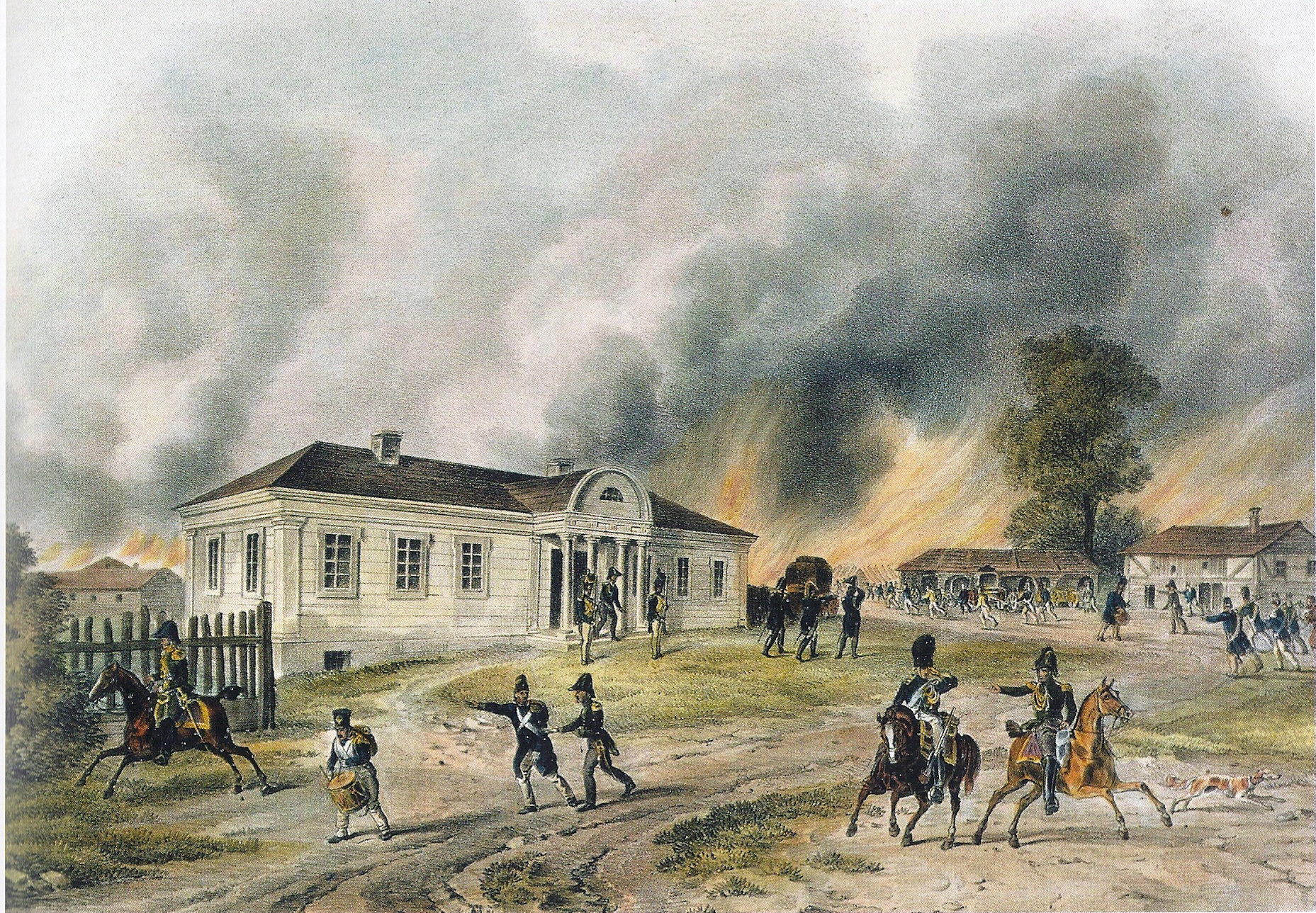
Dokshytsy in 1812

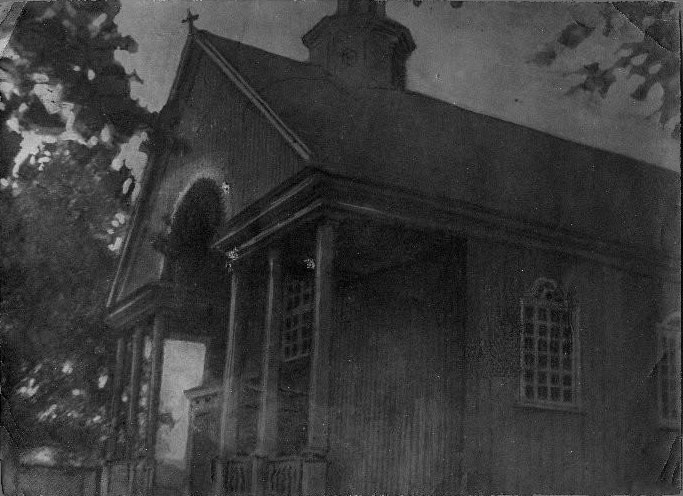
Non existent catholic church of the Holy Trinity in Dokshytsy

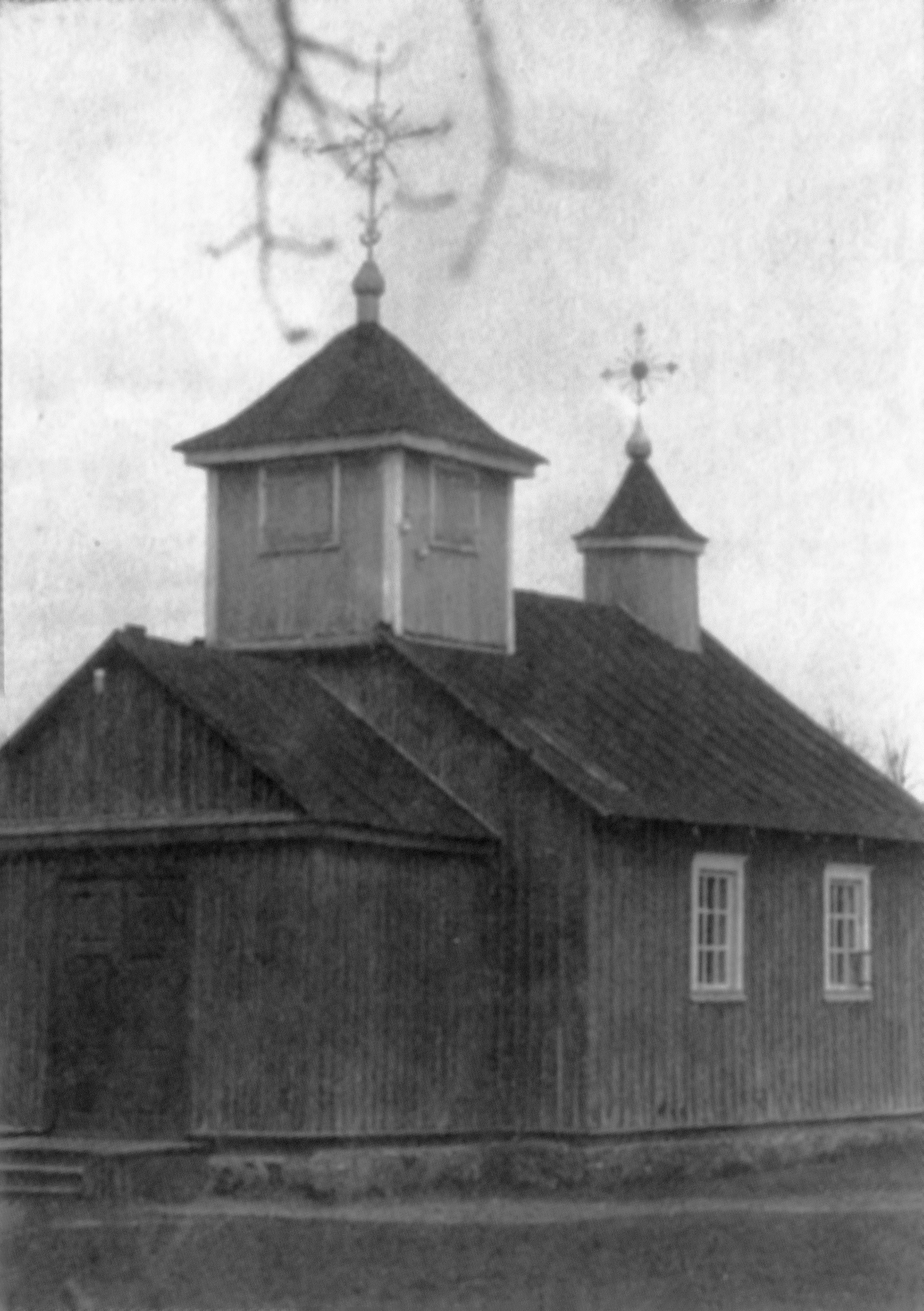
Orthodox church

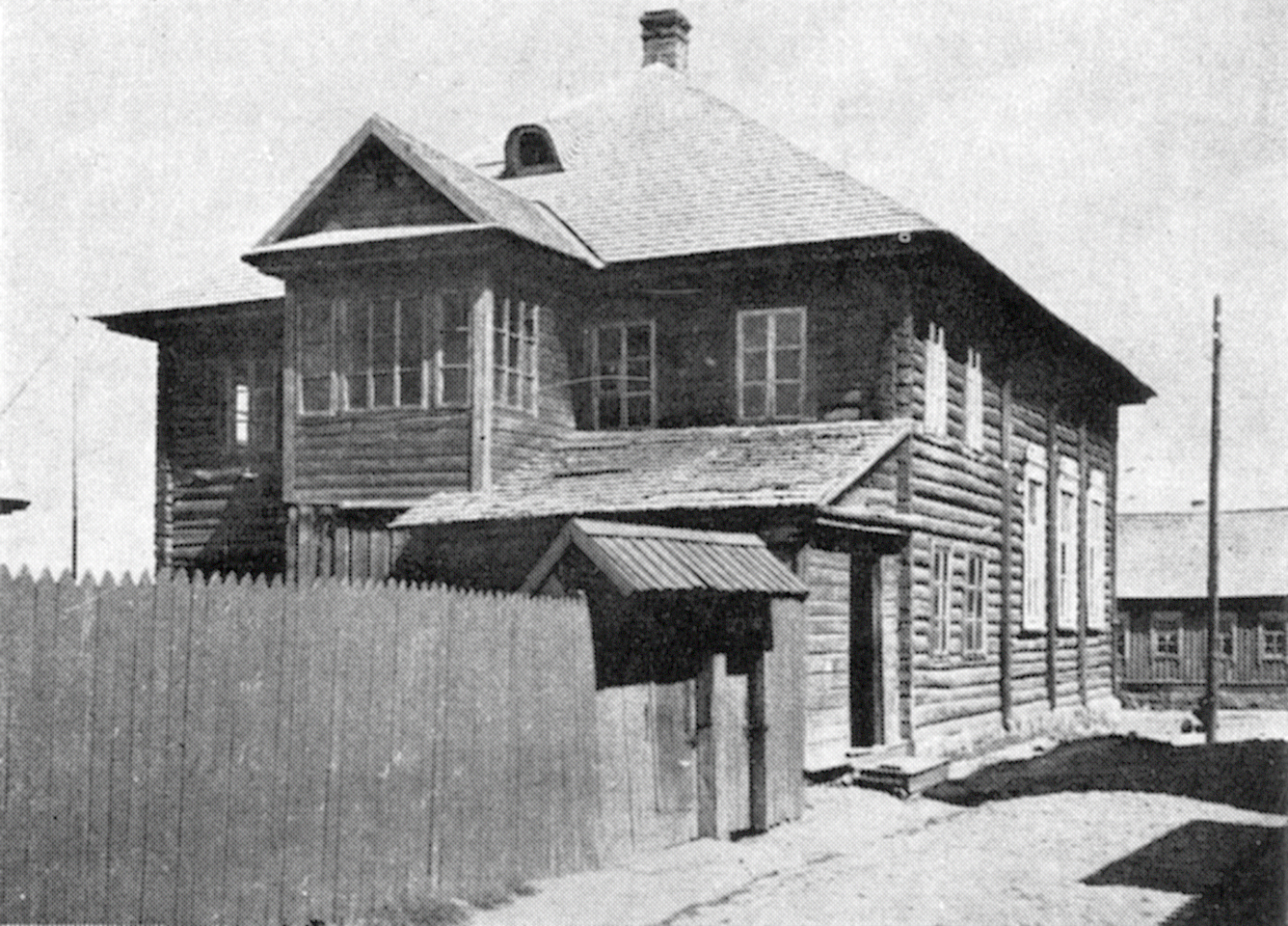
Synagogue
