= Dokshytsy district =

District of Vitebsk region, Belarus

Dokshytsy district Докшыцкі раён (Belarusian)
- District
- Flag Coat of arms

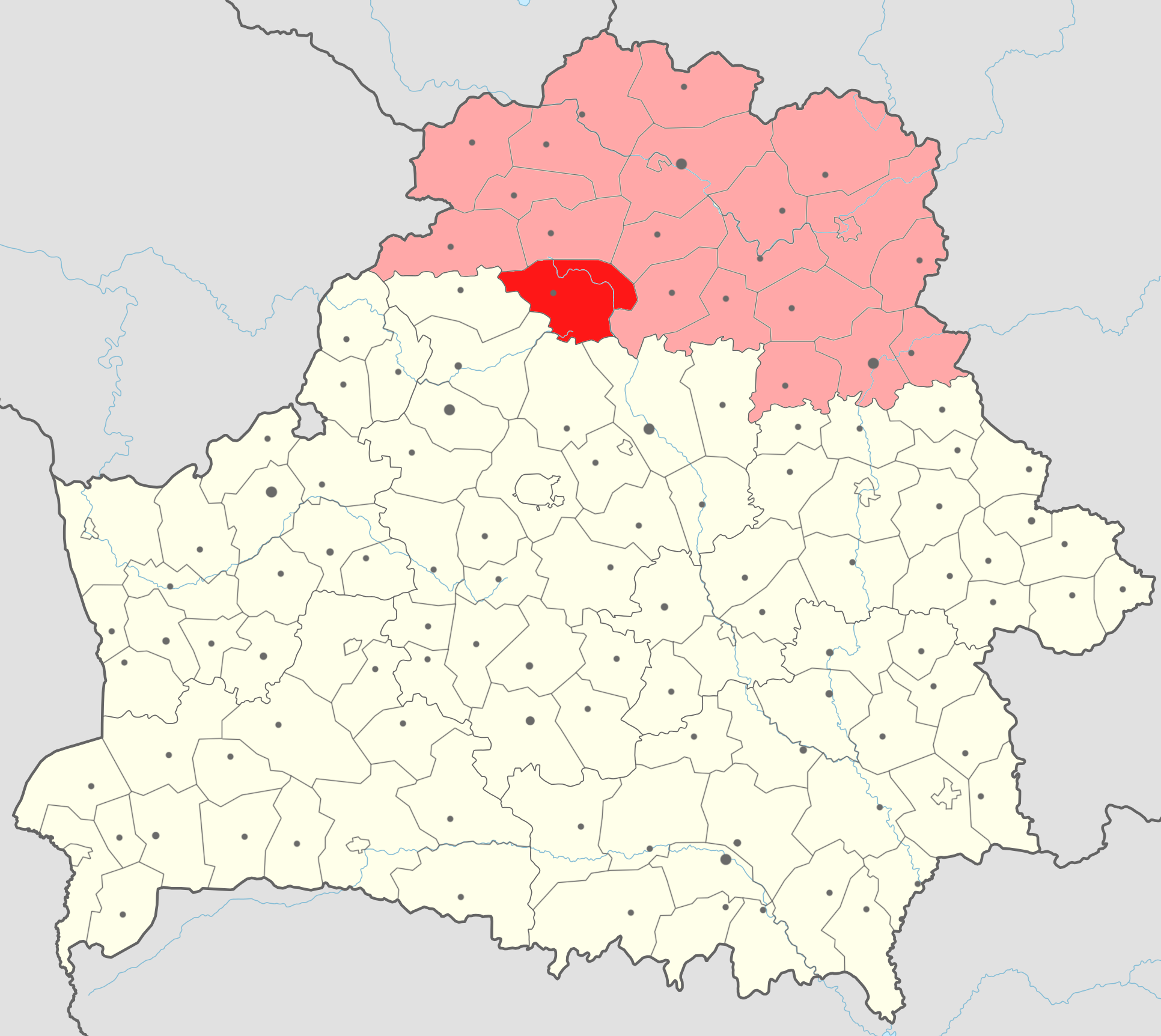
- Coordinates: 54°53′N 27°46′E
- Country: Belarus
- Region: Vitebsk region
- Administrative center: Dokshytsy

Area
  - Total: 2,267.61 km^{2} (875.53 sq mi)
- Elevation: 203 m (666 ft)

Population (2023)
  - Total: 21,003
  - Density: 9.2622/km^{2} (23.989/sq mi)
- Time zone: UTC+3 (MSK)

Dokshytsy district or Dokšycy district (Belarusian: Докшыцкі раён; Russian: Докшицкий район) is a district (raion) of Vitebsk region in Belarus. Its administrative center is Dokshytsy.

== Notable residents ==
- Kastuś Akuła (1925, Veracei village – 2008), Belarusian writer
