= Painted vessel from Shahtakhty =

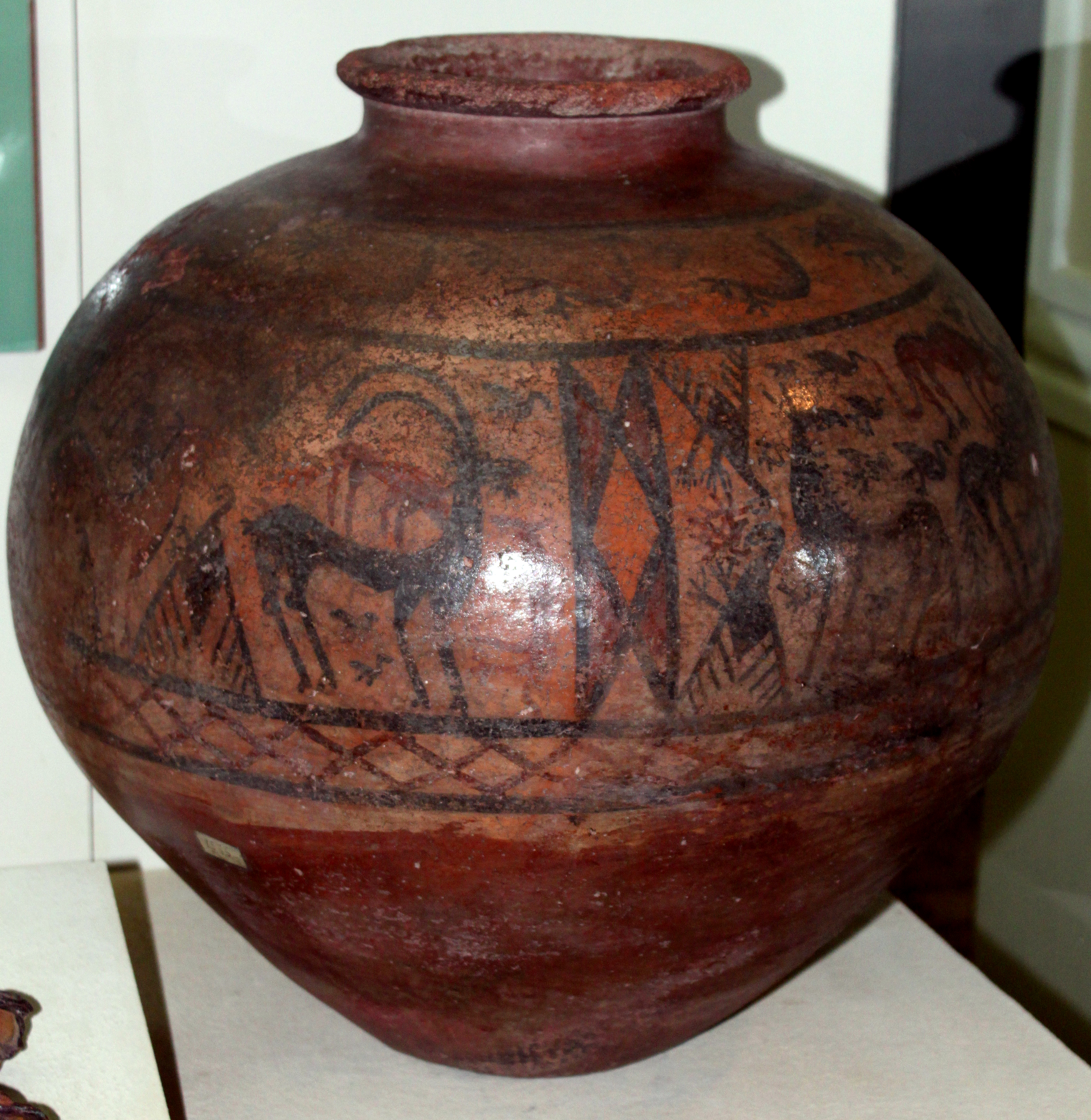
- Material: Clay
- Height: c. 48 cm
- Width: c. 50 cm
- Created: c. 1500 BC
- Discovered: 1936; Nakhchiva, Azerbaijan
- Present location: National Museum of History of Azerbaijan, Baku, Azerbaijan

ThePainted vessel from Shahtakhty (Azerbaijani: Əlvan naxışlı Şahtaxtı küpü) — is dated with the 2nd millennium BC. It is painted red and covered with three belts of drawings and was discovered in 1936 in a burial ground near the village of Shakhtakhty in Nakhichiva, Azerbaijan. It is exhibited in the National Museum of History of Azerbaijan in Baku. According to art critics Leonid Bretanitsky and Boris Veimarn, this well-preserved large vessel is a characteristic and one of the most famous examples of ceramic products of ancient Azerbaijan.

== The finding ==
In 1936, an expedition of the Azerbaijani branch of the USSR Academy of Sciences was sent to the Nakhichivan ASSR where the third place of work of the expedition was the vicinity of the village of Shakhtakhty in the Sharur District.

On the territory of the burial field located to the northeast of the Gyavurkala fortress, the archaeologists came across one burial covered with two rows of slabs (measuring 1.2 meters long and 1 meter wide and 30–40 cm thick) and therefore not affected. The burial was enclosed in a stone circle of 7.7 meters in diameter. In the western part of the burial there was an inventory consisting of 30 clay vessels that covered the skeleton of a horse lying on its left side. Of the 30 vessels, only one was painted with drawings.

== Description ==
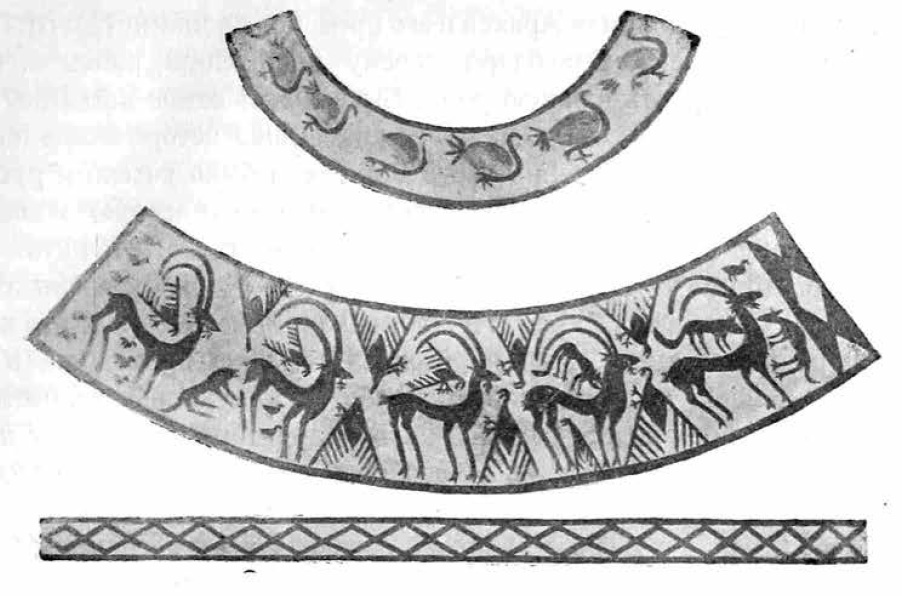

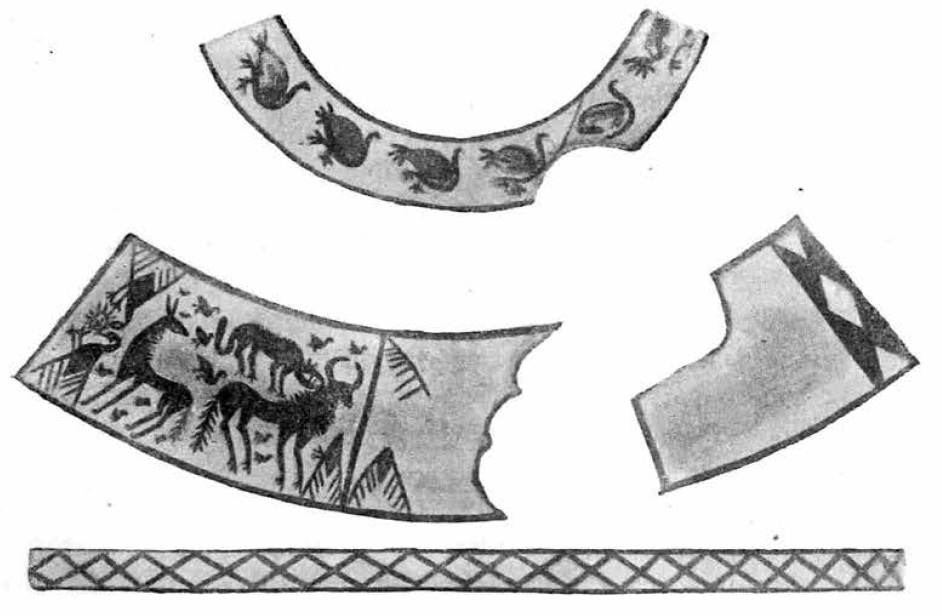
Details of the vessel from Shakhtakhti

The spherical vessel is made of red clay of a good firing. It has a low throat, a bent backrim, and a flat bottom. There are no handles. According to the archaeologist Alasgar Alekperov, its height and width is 48 cm. Osman Habibullaev provides more accurate data on the size of the vessel. According to him, the height of the vessel is 49.8 cm, the diameter of the bottom is 15 cm, the diameter of the body is 55.6 cm, and the rim is 19.2 cm. The entire surface of the vessel is colored red. The neck and the lower part are somewhat darker than the light red middle part, which is covered with three decorative belts of clearly traced drawings and ornaments.

The first belt is 7.5 cm wide and is covered with dark red and black images of geese and swans, arranged in a strict rhythm. The width of the second belt is 16 cm. Various scenes of the cycle of fighting of animals are depicted here. In these drawings, beasts and birds of prey attack wild goats, donkeys, bulls and bison. Waterfowl are depicted between the animals. According to the art critic Vladimir Shleev, the schematized scenes of the hunting of wolves (or dogs) and birds of prey on wild goats, a donkey and a bull on this belt are placed strictly rhythmically. The third belt consists of a simple ornament, composed of crossed stripes, forming rhombuses. Its width is 3.5 cm.

The shape, color and location of the vessel pattern exactly replicates the vessels found in the Kyzyl-Vank burial ground. By its size and pattern it differs from the Kyzyl-Vank ones. Alekperov believed that the drawings on the jug depicted the local fauna.

== Dating ==
According to the art critics Leonid Brittanitsky and Boris Veimarn, this vessel dates back to the middle of the 2nd millennium BC. The art critic Vladimir Shleev dates the vessel to the end of the 2nd millennium BC. The archaeologist and orientalist Boris Piotrovsky dates the burial ground where the vessel was found to the end of the 2nd millennium BC. The archaeologist Osman Abibullaev attributes the polychrome-painted vessels from the Shakhtakhtinsky burial to the 13th-12th centuries BC. The art critic Nasir Rzayev dates the vessel with the 18th-17th. centuries BC.

== See also ==
- Kültəpə
- Nargiztapa
- Garakopaktapa

== Literature ==
- Alakbarov, Alasgar (1937). Крашеная керамика Нахичеванского края и Ванское царство / Painted ceramics of the Nakhichevan region and the Van kingdom. Baku: Sovetskaya arkheologiya.
- Piotrovsky, Boris (1947). Археологическое изучение древнейшего Закавказья / Archaeological study of ancient Transcaucasia. Moscow: Journal of Ancient History. pp. 167–187.
- Shleev, Vladimir (1956). Искусство Древнего Закавказья / Art of Ancient Transcaucasia. Vol. I. Moscow: Искусство.
- Habibullaev, Osman (1961). Материалы Шахтахтинского погребения / Materials of the Shakhtakhtinsky burial. Moscow: Известия АН Азерб. ССР. pp. 27–37.
- Aliyev, Veli (1961). Azərbaycanda tunc dövrünün boyalı qablar mədəniyyəti / To the study of the culture of painted ceramics in Azerbaijan. Vol. VI. Baku: Материальная культура Азербайджана.
- Rzayev, Nasir (1966). Некоторые вопросы искусства Азербайджана древнего периода / Some questions of the art of Azerbaijan of the ancient period. Baku: Исследования и материалы по архитектуре и искусству Азербайджана.
- Brittanitsky, Leonid; Veimarn, Boris (1976). Искусство Азербайджана IV — XVIII веков / Art of Azerbaijan IV - XVIII centuries. Moscow: Искусство. p. 272.
- Aliyev, Veli (1991). Культура эпохи средней бронзы Азербайджана / Culture of the Middle Bronze Age of Azerbaijan. Baku: Elm.
