= Fuzuli–Hadrut highway =

Four-lane highway in Azerbaijan

Route information
- Length: 13 km (8.1 mi)
- Existed: 5 May 2023–present

Major junctions
- West end: Fuzuli–Shusha highway
- East end: Shukurbeyli–Jabrayil–Hadrut highway (towards Hadrut)

Location
- Country: Azerbaijan

Highway system
- Roads in Azerbaijan

Fuzuli–Hadrut highway (Azerbaijani: Füzuli–Hadrut avtomobil yolu) is a four-lane highway in Azerbaijan linking areas of the Fuzuli District and Khojavend District in the Karabakh and East Zangezur economic regions. The route begins from the Fuzuli–Shusha highway and connects to the Shukurbeyli–Jabrayil–Hadrut highway.

== History ==
Construction of the Fuzuli–Hadrut highway was launched on 16 March 2021. Earthworks, excavation and embankment works, widening, and formation of the new roadbed and base were reported during 2021.

By September 2022, substantial work on the roadbed and base along the 12 km construction section had been completed, with asphalt base-course works under way on some sections and water-crossing structures and bridge supports nearing completion. In January 2023, completion was reported for widening and construction of the new roadbed and base, and the asphalt base layer had been laid on up to 11 km of the road; the construction of multiple drainage structures (including culverts and underpasses) was also reported as completed.

The highway was commissioned on 5 May 2023.

== Features ==
The highway is 13 km long and is built as a four-lane road to technical category I. The carriageway width is 14 m, and the overall roadbed width is approximately 21–21.5 m.

Drainage infrastructure along the route includes culverts of varying diameters, underpasses, and a box culvert for the conveyance of rainwater and surface runoff. At kilometre 6.7, in the Garghabazar area, a road bridge 18 m long and 21 m wide was built.
