= Haji Alakbar Mosque =

Mosque in Fuzuli, Azerbaijan

- Azerbaijani: Hacı Ələkbər məscidi
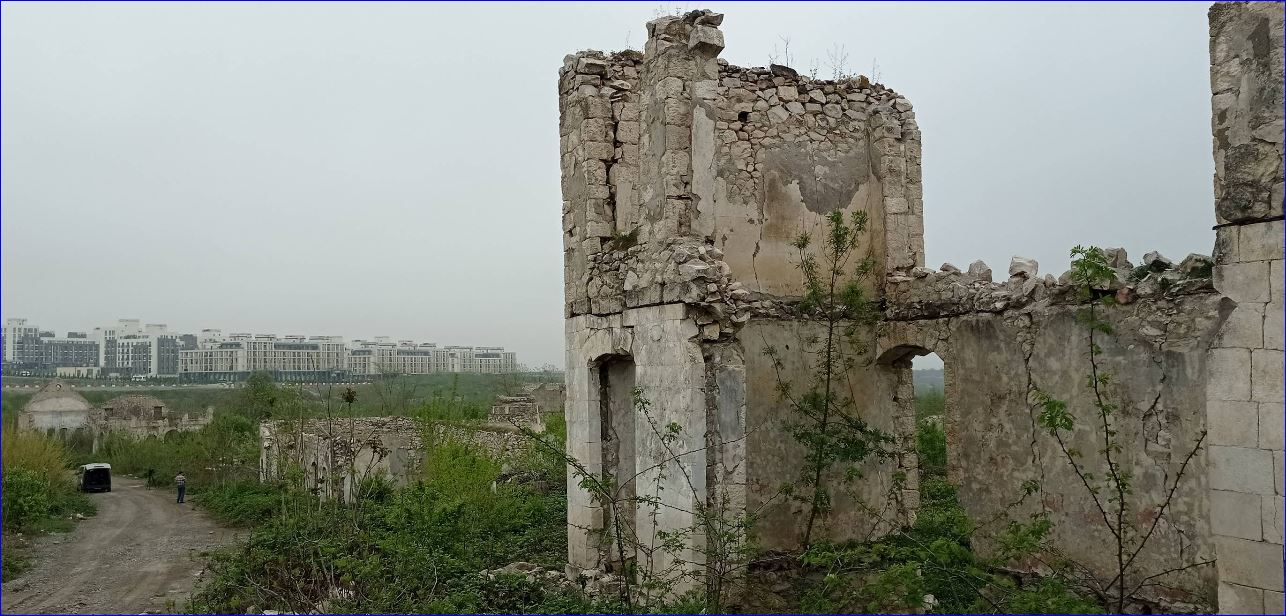
- The mosque ruins in 2025

Religion
- Affiliation: Shia Islam (former)
- Ecclesiastical or organisational status: Mosque (1890–1993); Profane use (1993– )
- Status: Destroyed

Location
- Location: Fuzuli
- Country: Azerbaijan
- Interactive map of Haji Alakbar Mosque
- Coordinates: 39°35′48″N 47°08′48″E

Architecture
- Architect: Karbalayi Safikhan Karabakhi
- Type: Mosque architecture
- Style: Islamic architecture
- Completed: 1890
- Destroyed: c. 1990s
- Minaret: Two

The Haji Alakbar Mosque (Azerbaijani: Hacı Ələkbər məscidi), also spelt as Haji Alekber Mosque, was a Shia Islam mosque located in Fuzuli, Azerbaijan. Completed in 1890 by Karbalayi Safikhan Karabakhi, a renowned architect, the mosque was subsequently destroyed, most likely in the 1990s.

== Overview ==
Karabakhiwho built the Yukhari Govhar Agha Mosque and Ashaghi Govhar Agha Mosque in Shusha, Aghdam Mosque, mosques in Horadiz and Qocahmadli villages, Tatar mosque in Odesa, Ukraine, and Qababaghlilar Mosque in Ashgabat, Turkmenistan.

This former mosque and monument of Islamic architecture is among 300 religious monuments of Karabakh and is famous for its structure along with Qiyas ad Din Mosque, also located in Fuzuli. Fuzuli, along with the Haji Alakbar Mosque, was occupied by Armenian forces in 1993, and its condition was unknown during the occupation. However, after the recapture of the city by Azerbaijan, it was found to be destroyed.

== See also ==
- Shia Islam in Azerbaijan
- List of mosques in Azerbaijan
