= Kochakhmedli Mosque =

Former mosque in Fuzuli, Azerbaijan

Kochahmadli Mosque
- Azerbaijani: Qoçəhmədli məscidi
- Location of the former mosque in Azerbaijan

Religion
- Affiliation: Shia Islam (former)
- Ecclesiastical or organizational status: Mosque (1906–1928); Profane use (1928–2020)
- Status: Abandoned (ruinous state)

Location
- Location: Qoçəhmədli, Fuzuli
- Country: Azerbaijan
- Interactive map of Kochahmadli Mosque
- Coordinates: 39°32′18.2″N 47°7′26.4″E

Architecture
- Architect: Karbalayi Safikhan Karabakhi
- Type: Mosque architecture
- Completed: 1906
- Materials: Stone

The Kochakhmedli Mosque (Azerbaijani: Qoçəhmədli məscidi) is a former Shia Islam mosque and historical architectural monument, now in ruins, located in the village of Qoçəhmədli, in the Fuzuli district of Azerbaijan.

== History ==
The Kochakhmedli Mosque, situated in the village of Kochakhmedli in the Fuzuli district, was constructed between 1905 and 1906 by Karbelayi Sefikhan Garabaghi. Positioned on a hillside, it is located above the estate of Shukur bey. The inscription above the entrance gate indicates that the mosque was built during the mentioned years. While there are slight differences in size, its architectural style, design, and layout resemble those of the Hajı Alekber Mosque. The prayer hall of the Kochakhmedli Mosque contains four octagonal stone columns. The projecting stones and niches, as well as the load-bearing wall columns placed on the same axis, are almost identical structural elements to those in the Hajı Alekber Mosque.

The former mosque consists of two floors, with the second floor designated for women.

=== Soviet occupation ===
Following the Soviet occupation, an official struggle against religion started in 1928. In December of the same year, the Central Committee of the Azerbaijani Communist Party transferred many mosques, churches, and synagogues to the balance sheets of educational clubs for instructional purposes. If there were about 3,000 mosques in Azerbaijan in 1917, by 1927, this number had decreased to 1,700, and by 1933, it was 17. Afterward, the mosques were closed and remained unused.

=== After independence ===
The village of Kochakhmedli was occupied by the Armenian Armed Forces in 1993.

After Azerbaijan regained its independence, the former mosque was included in the list of local significant immovable historical and cultural monuments by the decision No. 132 of the Cabinet of Ministers of the Republic of Azerbaijan dated August 2, 2001.

The village was liberated by the Azerbaijani Army on October 17, 2020. During the period of occupation, the mosque was partially destroyed and used as a barn by the Armenians.

== See also ==
- Shia Islam in Azerbaijan
- List of mosques in Azerbaijan
