= Askarov =

Askarov (Cyrillic: Аскаров, Azerbaijani: Əsgərov, Uzbek: Asqarov) is a central-Asian masculine surname, its feminine counterpart is Askarova. It may refer to

- Alla Askarova (born 1954), Russian alpine skier
- Almaz Askarov (footballer) (born 1992), Russian football midfielder
- Almaz Askarov (wrestler) (born 1973), Kyrgyzstani wrestler
- Azimzhan Askarov (1951–2020), Uzbek-Kyrgyzstani political activist
- Askar Askarov (born 1992), Russian mixed martial artist and freestyle wrestler
- Davron Askarov (born 1988), Kyrgyzstani football player
- Erzhan Askarov (born 1985), Kyrgyzstani middle-distance runner
- German Askarov (1882–1937?), Russian anarchist
- Gochag Askarov (born 1978), Azerbaijani khananda folk singer and piano player
- Yaroslav Askarov (born 2002), Russian ice hockey goaltender
