= Fuzuli (city) =

City in Azerbaijan

Fuzuli Füzuli
- City
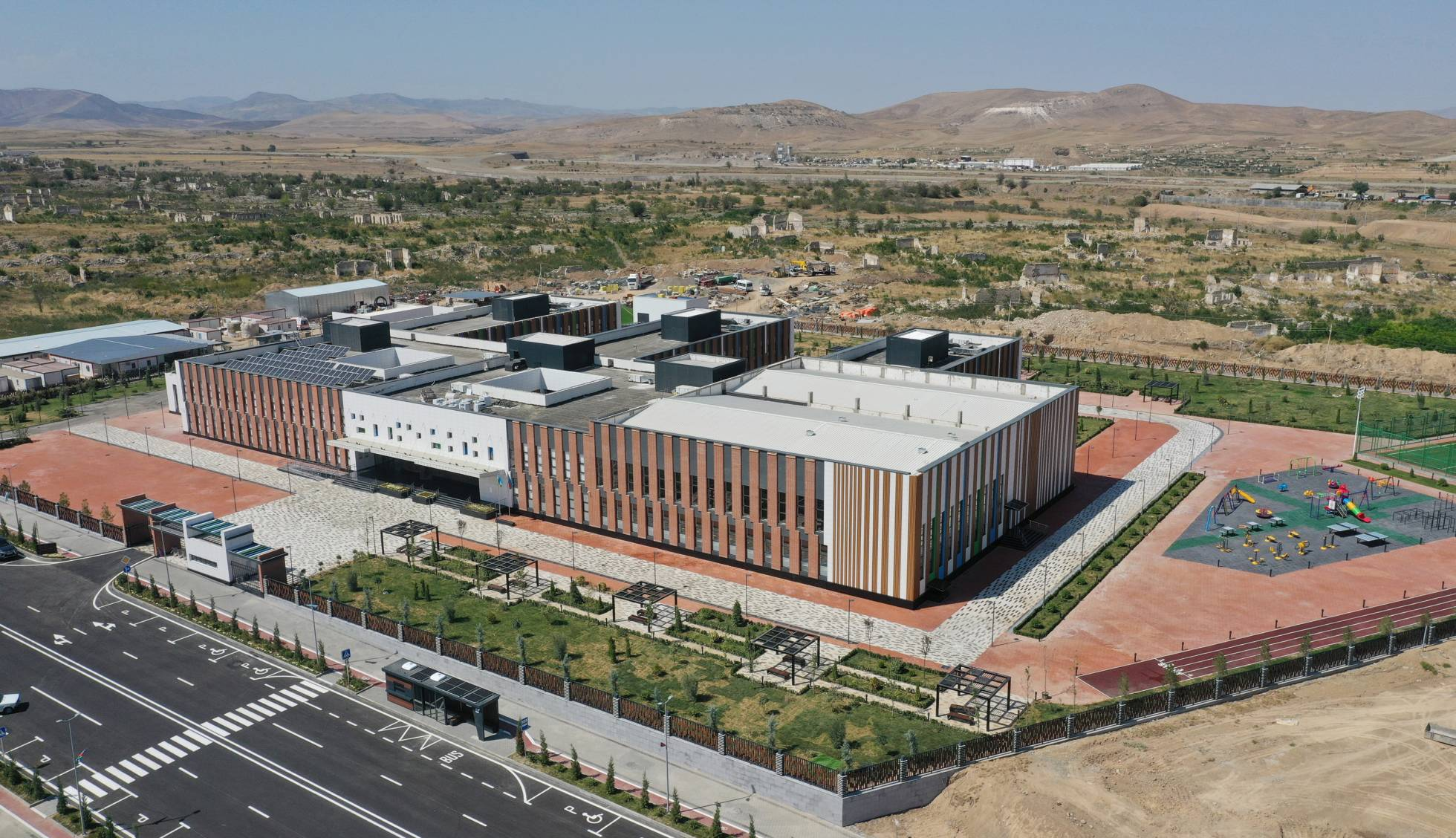
- Secondary school No. 1 named after Mirzo Ulugbek in Fuzuli

- Location within Azerbaijan Location within Karabakh Economic Region
- Coordinates: 39°36′01″N 47°08′35″E
- Country: Azerbaijan
- District: Fuzuli
- Founded: 1827
- Elevation: 416 m (1,365 ft)

Population (2023)
  - Total: 928
- Time zone: UTC+4 (AZT)
- Area code: +994 141

Fuzuli (Azerbaijani: Füzuli) is a city and the capital of the Fuzuli District of Azerbaijan.

The city had a population of 17,090 before its occupation by Armenian forces on 23 August 1993, during the First Nagorno-Karabakh War, which resulted in the expulsion of the local Azerbaijani population and the city becoming a ghost town. However people are slowly starting to return.

On 17 October 2020, Azerbaijani forces recaptured the city during the 2020 Nagorno-Karabakh war.

== Climate ==
Climate data for Fuzuli(normals for 1936-1991)
Month	Jan	Feb	Mar	Apr	May	Jun	Jul	Aug	Sep	Oct	Nov	Dec	Year
Average precipitation mm (inches)	27.8 (1.09)	31.7 (1.25)	52.6 (2.07)	48.4 (1.91)	59.8 (2.35)	43.7 (1.72)	13.4 (0.53)	22.4 (0.88)	44.1 (1.74)	59.3 (2.33)	44.0 (1.73)	27.9 (1.10)	475.1 (18.7)
Average precipitation days (≥ 0.01 in)	6.5	7.1	9.5	9.1	10.8	7.1	2.9	2.9	6.2	7.8	7	6.6	83.5
Source: NCEI

== History ==
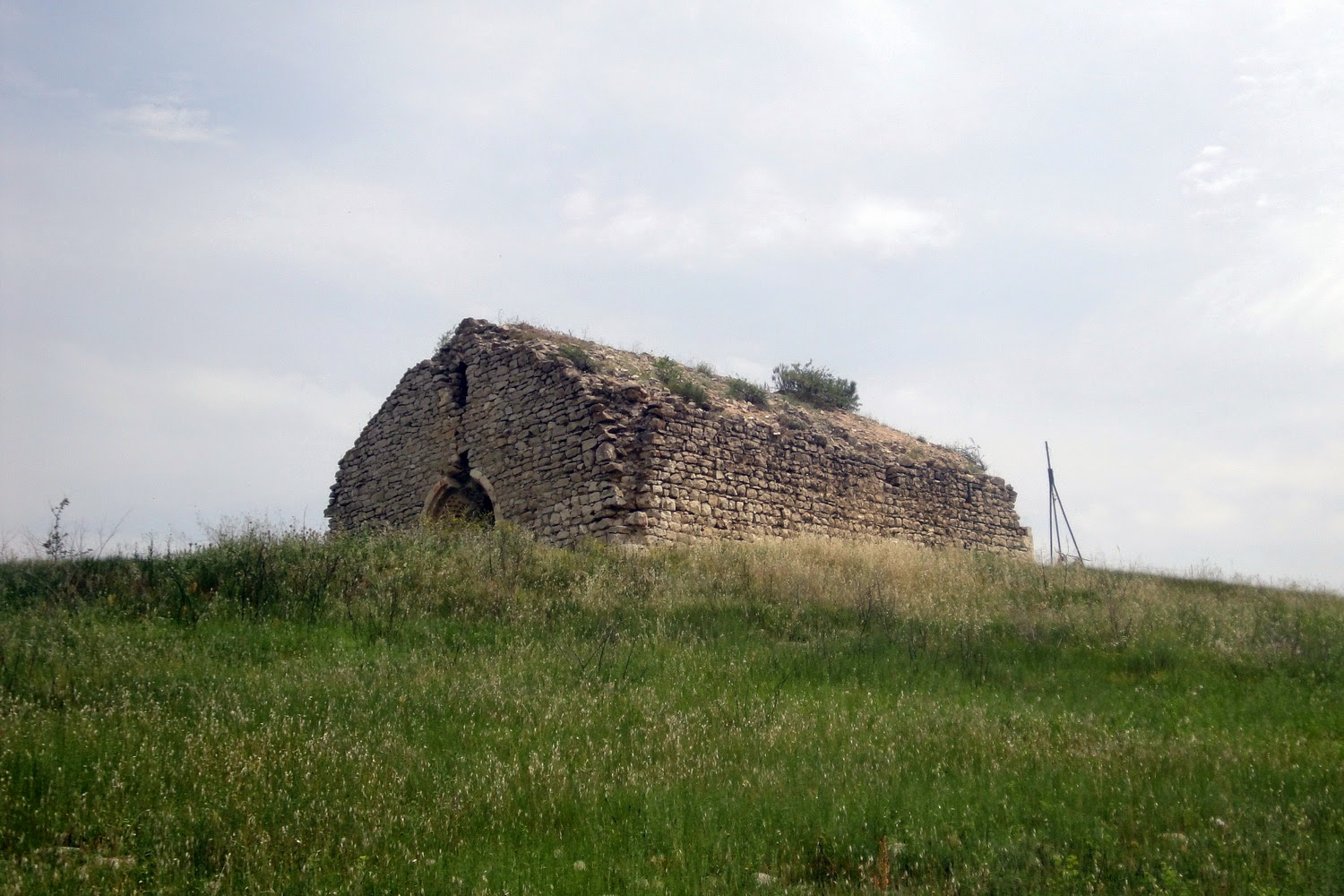
Kavakavank monastery of Dizak in the vicinity of Fuzuli

Archaeological excavations on the hill in the northern edge of the town, Garakopaktapa, uncovered artifacts from the 4th-3rd centuries BC, matching similar artifacts found throughout the Armenian highlands. In the Middle Ages, the area belonged to the historical province of Artsakh in the Kingdom of Armenia. By the late medieval period, it formed part of the Armenian principality of Dizak. The nearby Kavakavank monastery was rebuilt by order of Melik Yegan of Dizak in 1724.

=== Russian rule ===
Fuzuli was known as Qarabulaq (Azerbaijani: قره بلاغ, lit. 'black spring') until 1827 when it was renamed to Karyagino (Russian: Карягино), after Pavel Karyagin. Initially, its only inhabitants were Russians of the spiritual Molokan sect. In 1896, the population of the village was monoethnic, composed mostly of Russians. Over the years, the population expanded to include Turks, Kurds, and a small number of Armenians. The Turkic and Armenian populations of Fuzuli were primarily migrants from the city of Shusha who came for the commercial opportunities of the region. The primary occupation of the village was agriculture with the exception of the small Armenian minority who were primarily shop owners and shoe-makers. It was administrated as part of Dzhebrail Uyezd during the Russian Empire. The city later became the administrative center of the uezd ("county"), with the latter being eponymously renamed Karyaginsky Uyezd (pre-reform Russian: Карягинскій уѣздъ). According to the 1915 publication of the Caucasian Calendar, Karyagino had a population of 400 in 1914, mostly Russians.

The town was renamed to Füzuli in 1959. During the Soviet years, the city was the administrative centre of the Füzuli raion of Azerbaijan SSR. According to the 1979 census, 13,091 people lived in the city, of which 87% were Azerbaijanis and 7.4% were Russians and Ukrainians. Population rose to 17,090 in 1989.

=== Armenian occupation ===
During the First Nagorno-Karabakh War, the city was captured by Armenian forces on 23 August 1993. The city subsequently became a ghost town after its capture by Armenian forces and the expulsion of its Azerbaijani population. Subsequently, it was made part of the Hadrut Province of the breakaway Republic of Artsakh and was renamed Varanda (Armenian: Վարանդա). In 2010, the town had a population of 99. It was named after the medieval Armenian melikdom of Varanda, which ruled over the area that later became Fuzuli.

=== Recapture by Azerbaijan ===
In the context of the 2020 Nagorno-Karabakh war on October 17, 2020, the president of Azerbaijan, Ilham Aliyev stated that the Azerbaijani army had retaken control of the city. The next day, the Azerbaijani Ministry of Defence released a video from Fuzuli, showing Azerbaijani soldiers raising the Azerbaijani flag in the centre of the city. On 16 November, Azerbaijani President Ilham Aliyev visited the city and hoisted the Azerbaijani flag on the territory of the former military base of the Armenian forces in Fuzuli.

=== Reconstruction ===
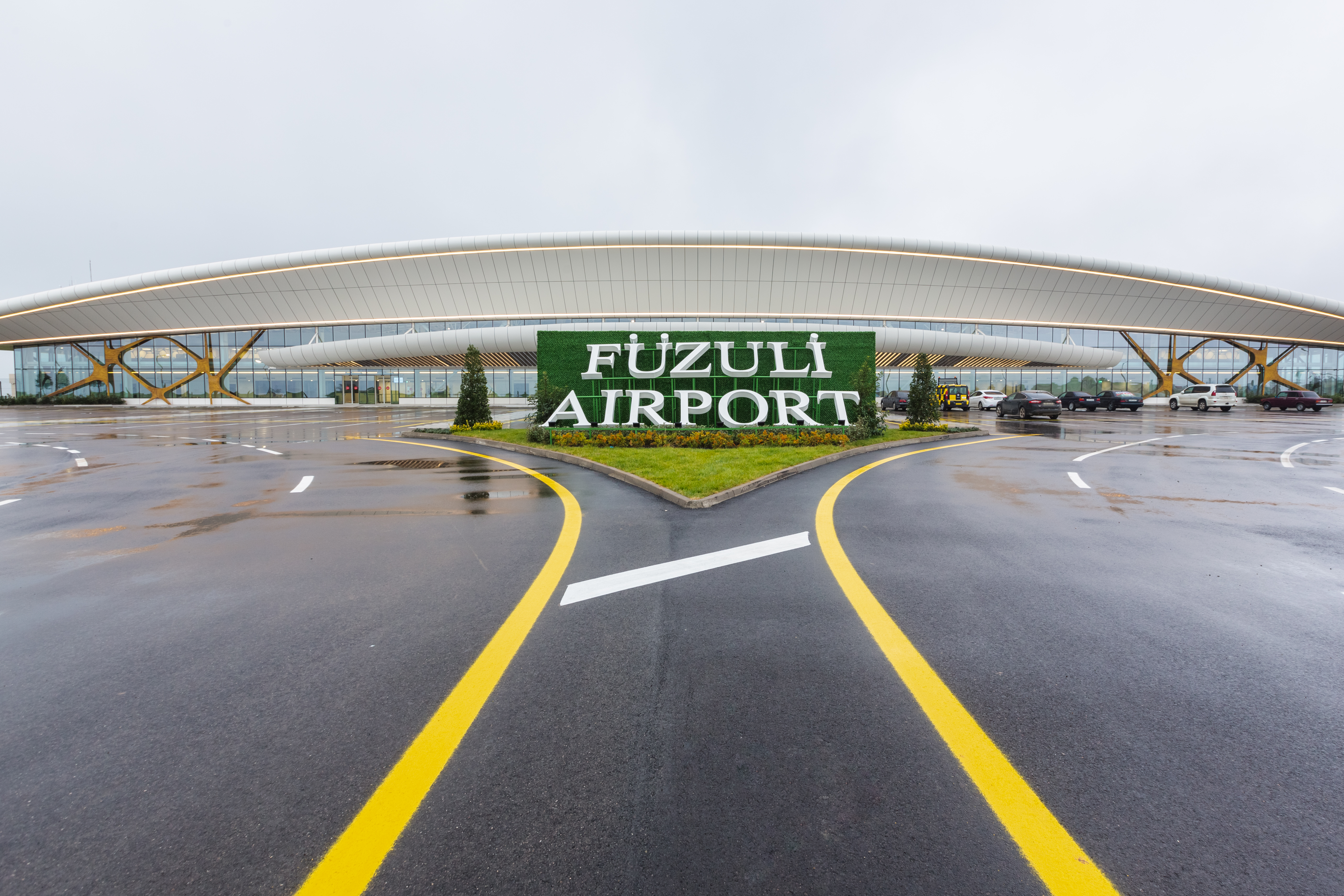
Fuzuli International Airport

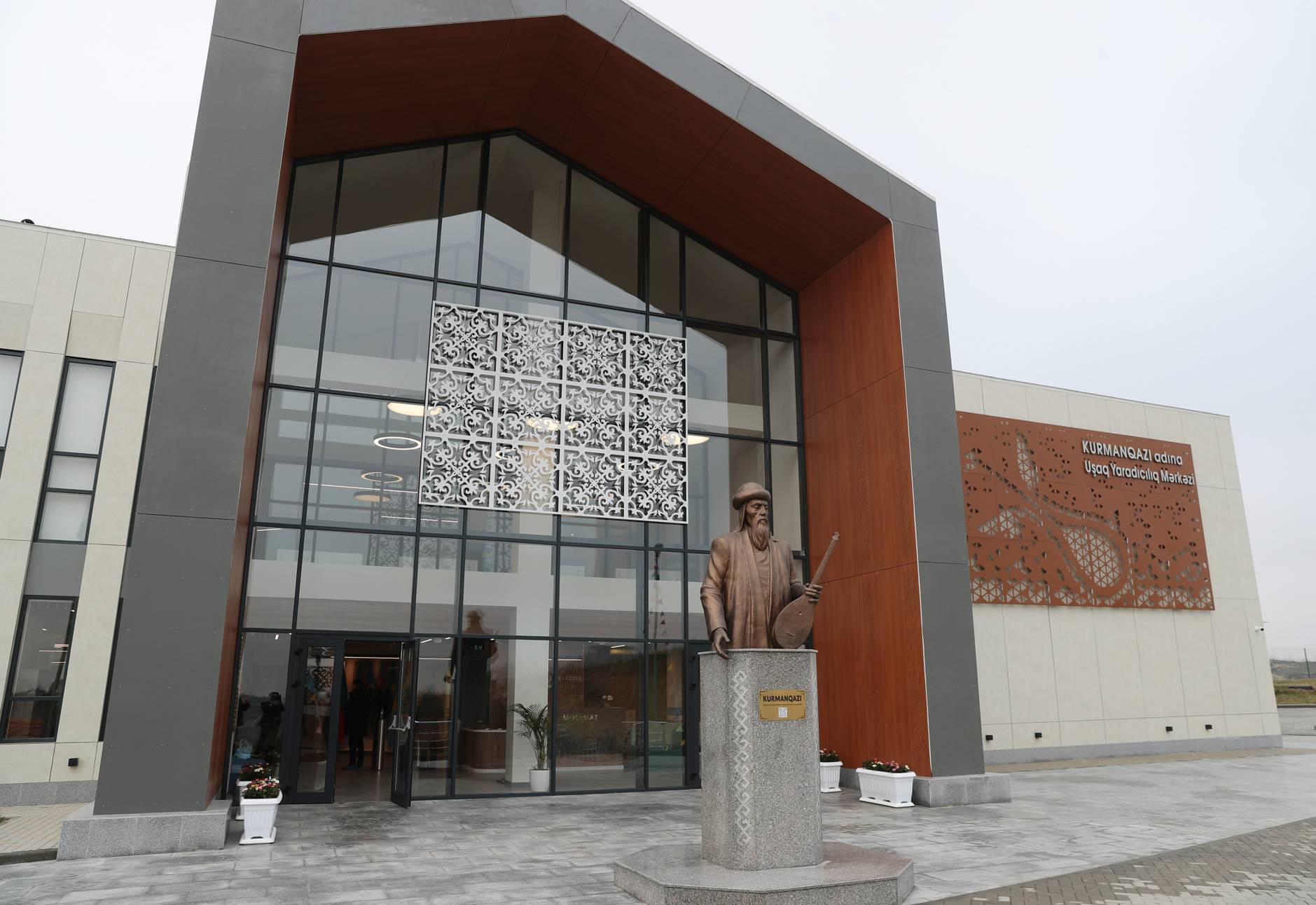

As part of a massive reconstruction project, a new highway is to be built to Shusha via Fuzuli, according to President Aliyev who announced the plan to build during his 16 November 2020 visit to the ruins of the latter town. The process was started with immediate effect, press reports suggesting the new 101 km multi-lane highway should be finished by mid-2022.

On 5 January 2021, Azerbaijani president Ilham Aliyev, announced that an international airport was planned to be built near Fuzuli. Four days later, the plan for a Fuzuli-Shusha railway was also made public. Fuzuli International Airport was inaugurated on 26 October 2021 by the presidents of Azerbaijan and Turkey.

On 31 July 2023, Fuzuli City Day was established by presidential decree, to be celebrated annually on 17 October, marking the anniversary of the city's liberation.

== Notable people ==
- Ilyas Afandiyev — writer, Honored Artist of Azerbaijan SSR (1960), People's writer of the Azerbaijan SSR (1979).
- Gara Garayev — National footballer, Azerbaijani Footballer of the Year (2014), currently playing for the domestic Premier League side FK Qarabağ

== Transport ==
- Road

Fuzuli–Shusha highway

- Airport

Fuzuli International Airport

== Gallery ==
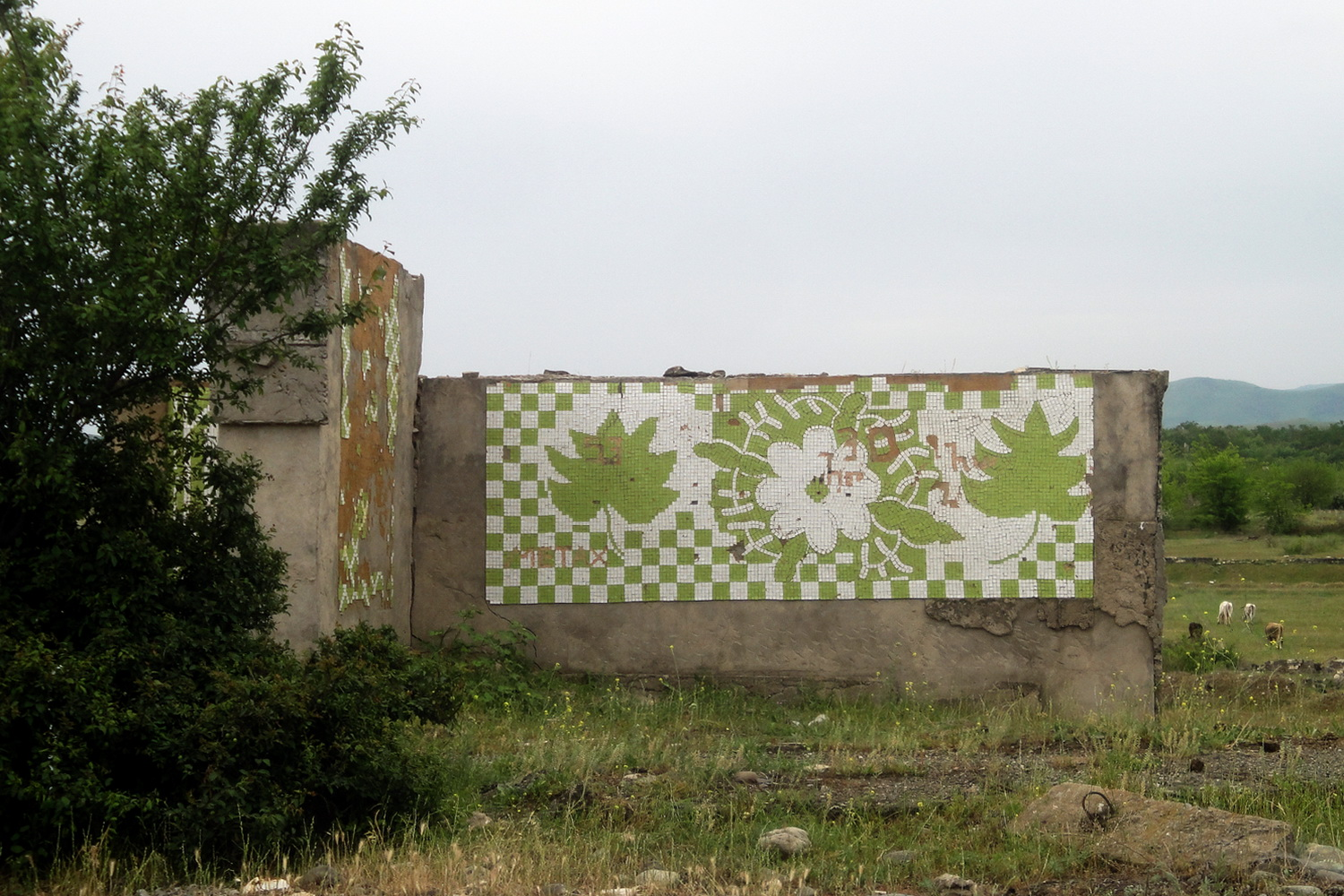
Old bus stop in Fuzuli

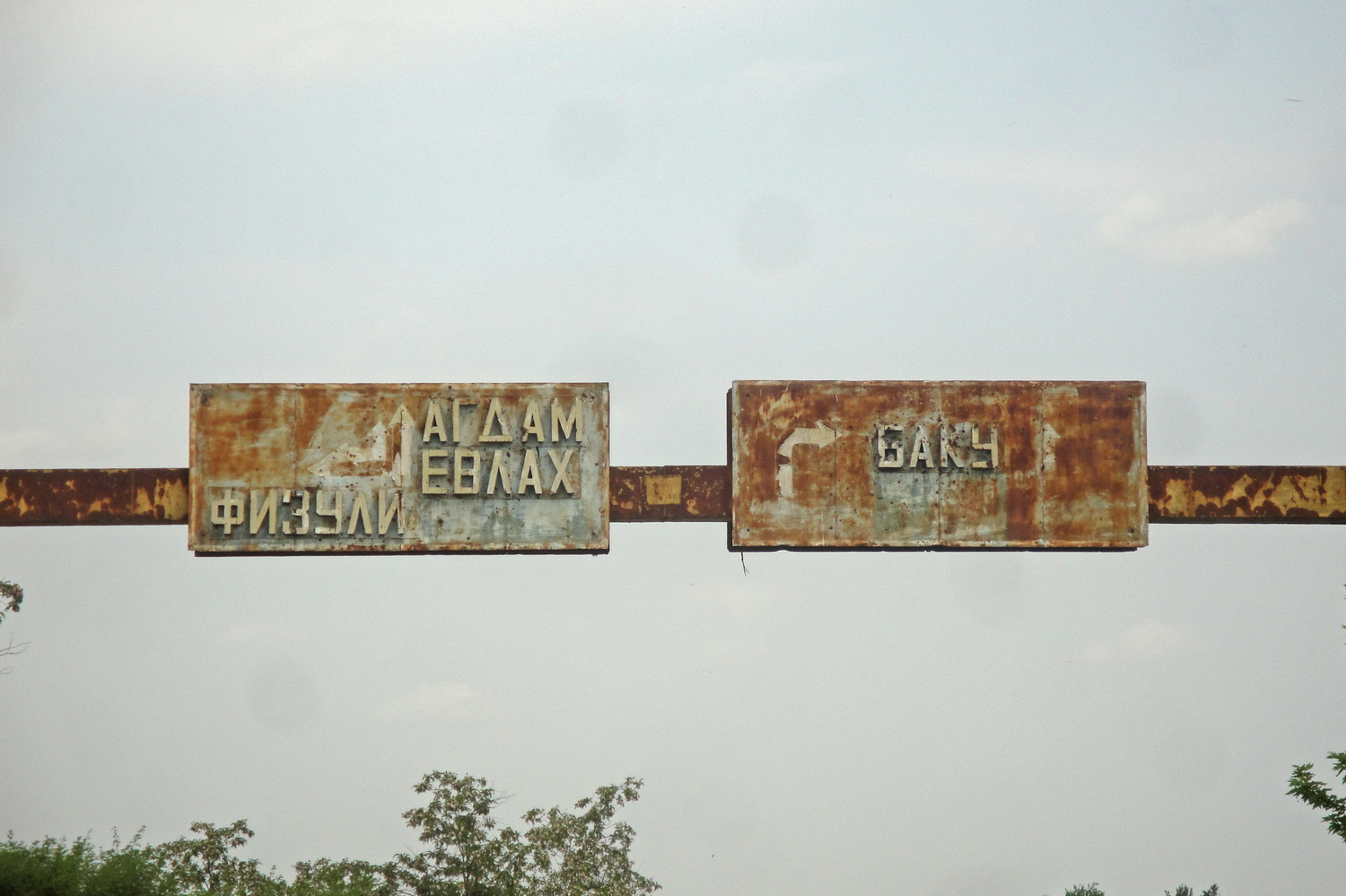
Old transport index in Fuzuli

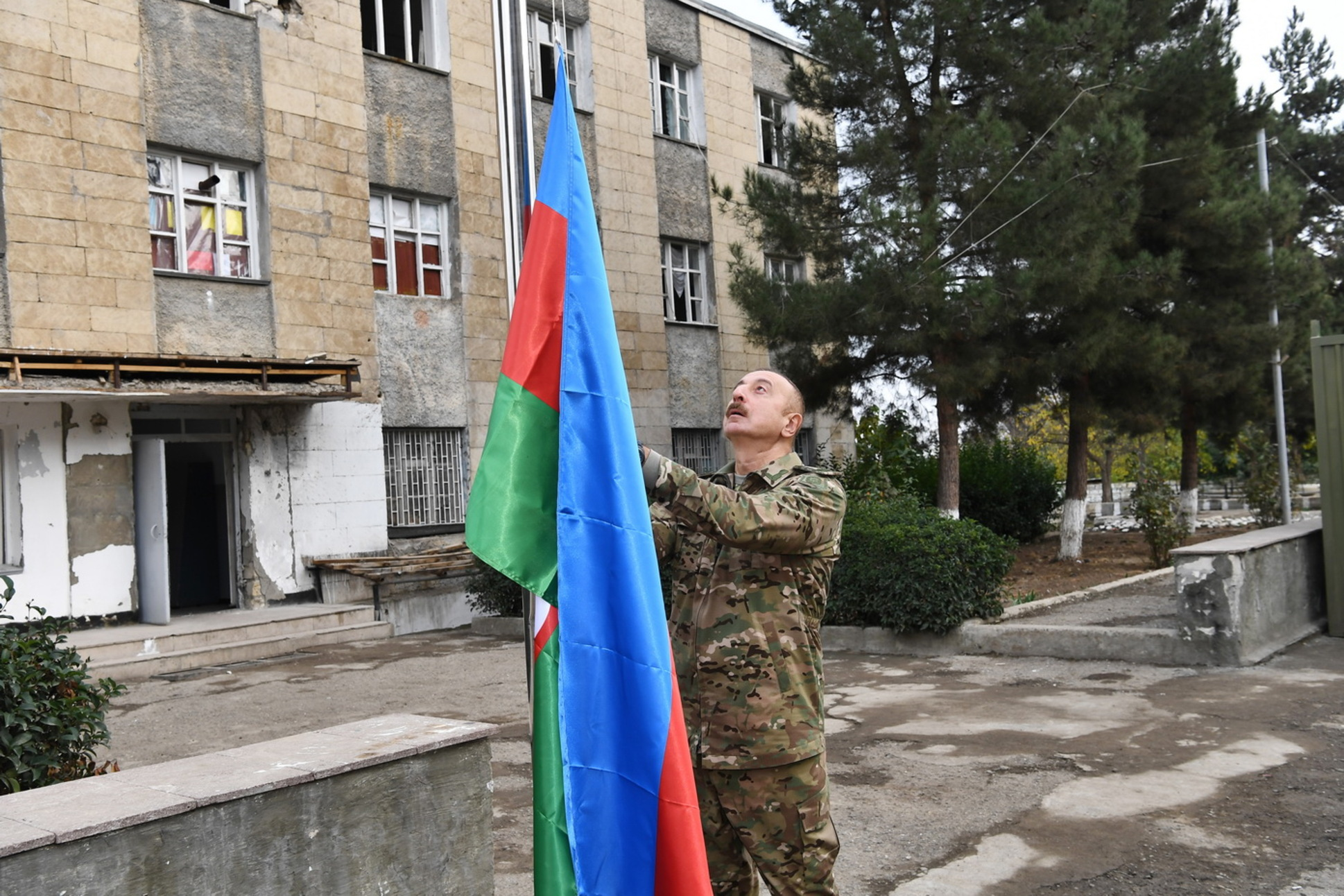
Ilham Aliyev raising the Azerbaijani flag in Fuzuli, 16 November 2020

== Twin towns and sister cities ==
Fuzuli is twinned with:

- Arkadag (Turkmenistan), since 2025

== See also ==
- Haji Alakbar Mosque
