= Shukurbeyli–Jabrayil–Hadrut highway =

Highway in Azerbaijan

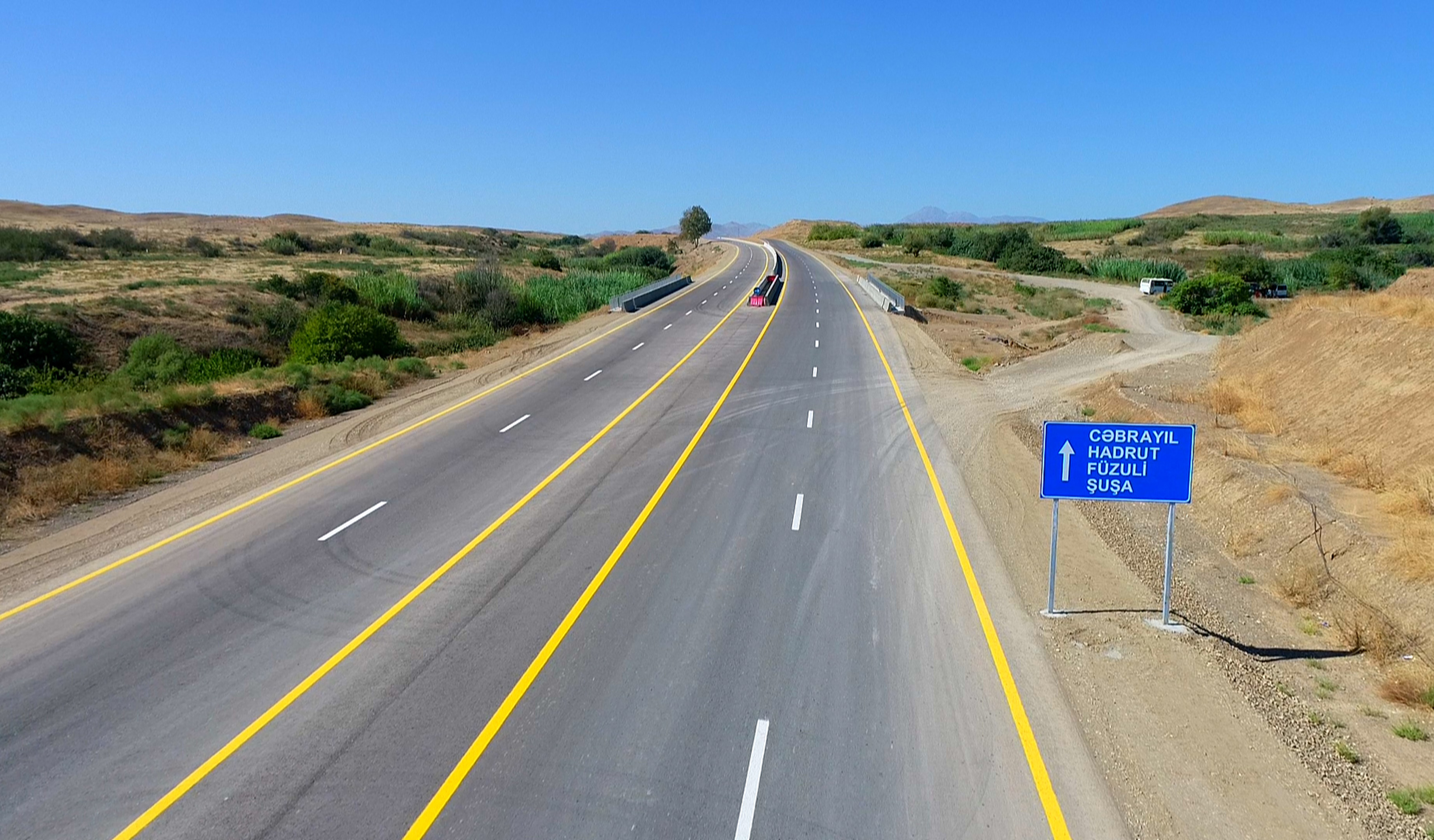
- Shukurbeyli–Jabrayil section of the highway

Route information
- Length: 39.7 km (24.7 mi)
- Existed: 19 October 2022–present

Major junctions
- SW end: Shukurbeyli (Jabrayil District)
- NE end: Hadrut (Khojavend District)

Location
- Country: Azerbaijan

Highway system
- Roads in Azerbaijan

Shukurbeyli–Jabrayil–Hadrut highway (Azerbaijani: Şükürbəyli–Cəbrayıl–Hadrut avtomobil yolu) is a four-lane highway in Azerbaijan running through the Khojavend, Fuzuli and Jabrayil districts. It links the Shukurbeyli section of the Hajigabul–Horadiz–Aghband–Zangezur corridor highway with the settlement of Hadrut.

The highway has a total length of 39.7 km and provides access to around 20 settlements, including Jabrayil and Hadrut.

== History ==
A foundation-laying ceremony for the highway was held on 15 March 2021, and construction started immediately afterwards.

The 14.2 km Shukurbeyli–Jabrayil section was commissioned on 19 October 2022. An additional 8.2 km section was commissioned on 5 May 2023.

== Design ==
The highway is being built as a four-lane, technical-category I road. The carriageway width is 14–14.5 m and the roadbed width is 21.5 m.

The project includes multiple drainage and protection structures, including circular culverts, nine box culverts, and animal underpasses intended to reduce impacts on fauna. Six road bridges are part of the route, including a bridge designed at the intersection with the Hajigabul–Mincivan–Zangezur corridor alignment to enable grade-separated access.

The new alignment replaces an older 42 km route and shortens the corridor by 2.3 km to 39.7 km.
