= Gochag Askarov =

Azerbaijani musician (born 1978)

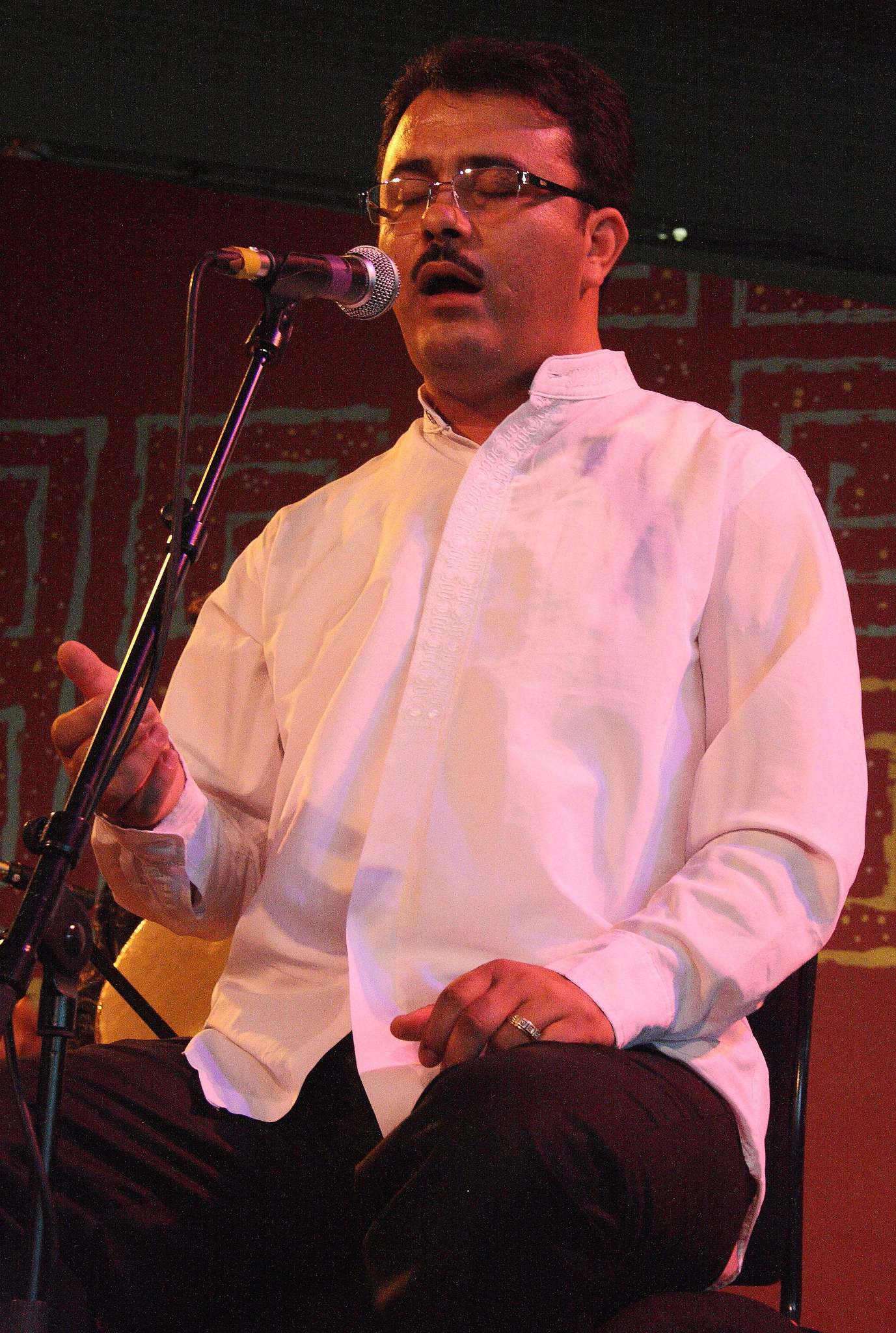
- Gochag Askarov

Background information
- Born: 27 December 1978; Ghouchahmedli, Fuzuli District, present-day Azerbaijan
- Genres: Folk, Mugham

Gochag Muharram oglu Askarov (Azerbaijani: Əsgərov Qoçaq Məhərrəm oğlu; born 27 December 1978 in Ghouchahmedli, Fuzuli District, Azerbaijan Soviet Socialist Republic, USSR) is an Azerbaijani khananda folk singer and piano player.

== Early career ==
Gochag Askarov was born in 1978 in Garabagh, Azerbaijan. He enrolled for music school but soon had to stop his music studies in 1992 with the Armenian occupation of Garabagh. His family fled and wandered from town to town until they settled in Baku. In 1998 he was accepted to the Baku Music College to the class of Mugham vocals. From 2004 to 2008 he studied music and traditional vocals at the National Conservatoire in Baku. In 2006 while being a student he took part in the First National TV Contest for young khanende (Mugham singers) and became one of its winners.

The next year he was invited to perform at the stage of Brunei Gallery Theatre in London. That was his international debut and, at the same time, his first solo concert. The same year for the first time the BBC Radio 3 featured him in its “World Routes” programme, and since then has done it many times. In 2009 BBC Radio 3 invited him to perform at its stage at the WOMAD festival in the Charlton-park in London.

The same year Gochag Askarov won the First Prize of the International World Music Festival in Samarqand (Uzbekistan).

Since 2007, for eight years of his public music activity, 36-year old Gochag Askarov has performed at several international world music festivals, including WOMAD (UK, 2009), WOMADelaide, (Australia, 2010), Taranaki (New Zealand, 2010), WOMEX (Greece, 2012), Proms (UK, 2013), SXSW (United States, 2014), and dozens of other international music festivals in Europe, Asia, and Middle East, such as Musica dei Popoli (Italy, 2012 ) RASA Muziek & Dans (The Netherlands, 2012), Casa Asia Festival (Spain, 2012 ), Shanghai World Music Festival (China, 2014), Jerusalem Oud Festival (Israel, 2014), etc. His voice was recorded on several albums released by the ARC Music Production, the Nascente Records (UK), the Felmay Records (Italy), etc. His latest albums released by Felmay Records in 2011 and 2013 were reviewed by Songline, The Wire (UK), Trad, Les Inrocks (France), and All About Jazz (Italy), and many other renowned European magazines. The magazine Folk World praised his 2011 Felmay album as a "beautiful album by a fantastic singer". British musical magazine Songlines reviewed his 2013 Felmay album. Gochag Asgarov performed Azerbaijani mugam for the first time at the Royal Albert Hall in 2013 at the BBC's Promenade night concert. In 2018, he gave a concert with French musician Pierre de Trégomain at the Festival des 5 Continents in Switzerland. Performed at the HEART & MIND festival in 2020. In 2018, he was awarded the honorary title of Honored Artist of Azerbaijan.

== Discography ==
Discography
Year	Name	Producing company	Producing country	Notes
2008	Music from Azerbaijan. Gochag Askarov & Sari Gelin Ensemble	ARC Music Productions, EUCD 2146	United Kingdom	
2009	Qoçaq Əsgərov. Azərbaycan Musiqi Dünyası (English: Gochag Askarov. Musical World of Azerbaijan)	Melodiya MMC	Azerbaijan	
2010	Music from Azerbaijan. Gochag Askarov & Mugham ensemble TURAN	Bird Walks Records, BW- 01	Australia	
2011	Gochag Askarov. Mugham/Traditional music of Azerbaijan	Felmay Records, CD, fy 8183	Italy	
2011	"World Routes: On The Road”, 2 CD	Nascente Records, (NASCE001), BBC - disc 2, track 10	United Kingdom	
2012	The Womeximizer 12, CD 12 WOMEX Selections,	Piranha Records AG	Germany	
2013	Gochag Askarov. Sacred World of Azerbaijani Mugham	Felmay Records, CD, fy 8210	Italy}	
2013	Mugham of Azerbaijan CD, track 7	Songlines music magazine	United Kingdom	
2017	Mugham Souls (Traditional Music of Modern Azerbaijan)	Felmany	Italy	

== International reaction ==
Gochaq Askarov's performances have received critical acclaim in several international publications:

- 2010, Australia, radio Daily Planet: “Gochag Askarov, with his richly timbered, high voice, is one of the country's premier singers.”
- 2010, Australia, Adelaide Review: “The near-midnight spot once set aside for such extraordinary performers as the late Nusrat Fateh Ali Khan and Subramaniam will, this time, include the haunting vocals of Gochag Askarov, performing Azerbaijani mugham music”.
- 2011, France, Musique du Monde: "From the first verse sung, sprung from the bowels as a complaint, and then repeated several times slowly, the ear is hanging, almost tamed by that haunting voice, the sober and haunting beauty, undulating soon on fourth mats tone, hemmed in syncope, swift and strong. Dubbed the Nusrat Fateh Ali Khan mugham, Gochag ... Askarov performer with uncommon passion this traditional music of Azerbaijan".
- 2012, United Kingdom, Southbank Centre: “Gochag Askarov is Azerbaijan's finest exponent of the mugham vocal style”... “The drama and virtuosity of Gochag's voice have been entrancing audiences internationally with his appearances at WOMAD festivals in the UK, Australia and New Zealand”.
- 2014, United States, SXSW: “Gochag Askarov`s voice of almost three-octave range is capable of conveying drama, passion, or moving the listener by melancholy, or captivating by bright virtuosity”.
- 2014, Israel, Jerusalem Post: “Extremely dramatic and intense high-range singing, followed the sudden switch to a calm, low and soft passage, has an even more strongly moving emotional effect. Askarov emerged as a veritable master…”.
