= Nargiztapa =

Coordinates: 39°51′6″N 47°11′29″E

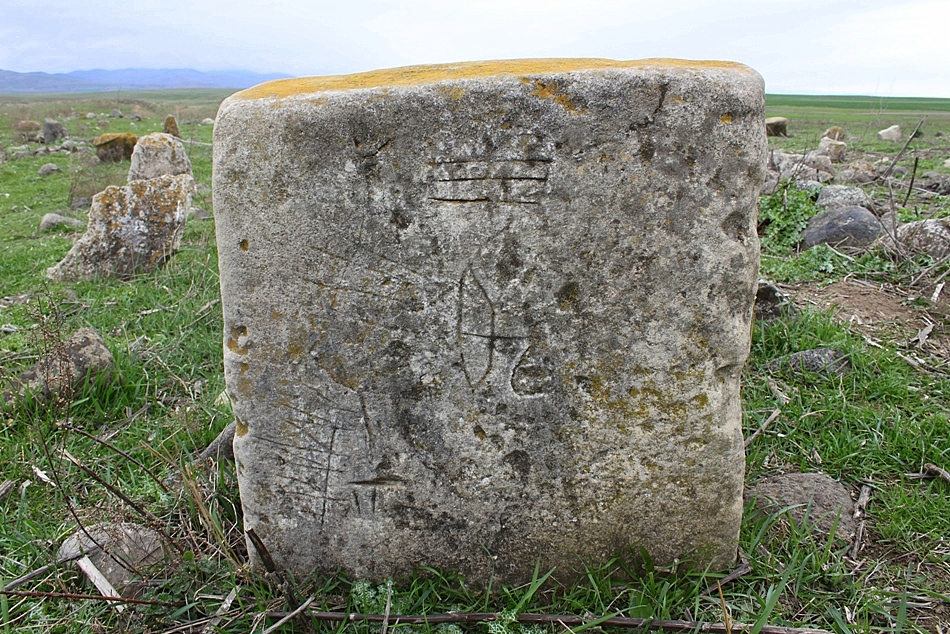
One of ancient gravestones on Nargiztapa hill

Nargiztapa (Azerbaijani: Nərgiztəpə) – is a locality in Mil plain, located in Khojavend Rayon of Azerbaijan, 5 km to the east from Khojavend and to the south from the Khanashenchay River’s bed, where archeological objects – remains of a settlement of the Bronze Age epoch – were found out.

Judging by findings of ceramics, cultural deposits of Nargiztapa locality are identical with upper layers of Uzarliktapa, a settlement of Middle Bronze Age epoch, in eastern outskirts of Agdam Rayon.
