= Fuzuli–Shusha highway =

Highway in Azerbaijan

Fuzuli–Shusha highway Victory Road
- Füzuli-Şuşa avtomobil yolu Zəfər yolu
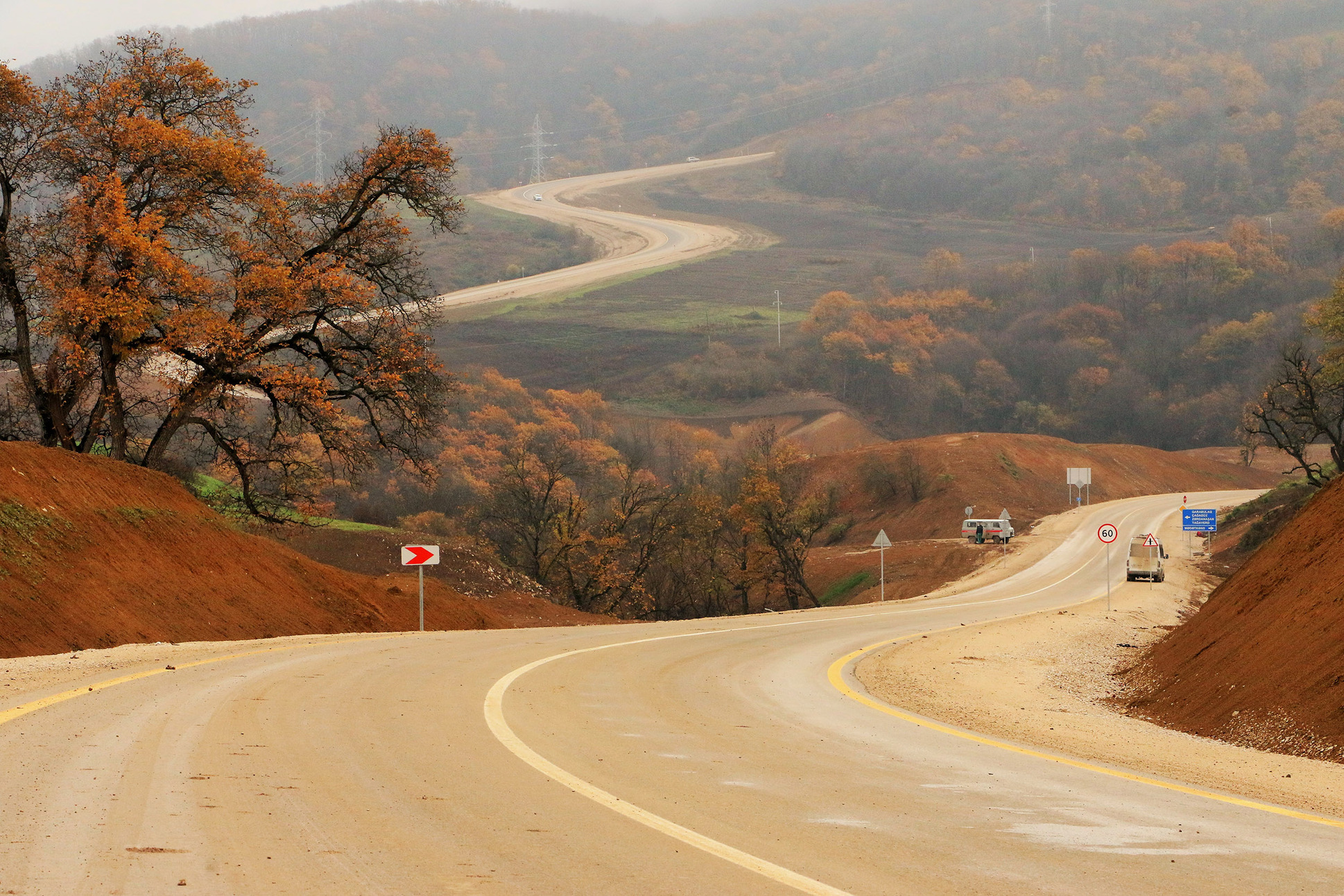

Route information
- Length: 101.5 km (63.1 mi)

Major junctions
- From: Əhmədbəyli
- To: Shusha

Location
- Country: Azerbaijan
- Municipalities: Fuzuli, Shusha

Highway system
- Roads in Azerbaijan

The Fuzuli–Shusha highway, also called Victory Road, is a 101.5-kilometre-long (63.1 mi) highway in Azerbaijan that runs from Fuzuli to Shusha.

The two-lane highway will have a length of 101.5 km and pass through the Fuzuli, Khojavend, Khojaly and Shusha districts.

== Details ==
The Road starts from the village of Ahmadbayli in the Fuzuli district and runs through 20 settlements, including the city of Fuzuli, the villages of Tug and Boyuk Taglar, the Khojavend district, the village of Signakh, the Khojaly district, Dashalty, Shusha district, in the direction of the city of. Simultaneously, with this road, a six-lane Fuzuli-Shusha road is being built, with a total length of 84.6 km and a width of 29.5 and 21.5 m. The road will cross this track in 8 places.

The construction of the Road is carried out by Azerbaijani and Turkish companies in coordination with the State Agency for Highways of Azerbaijan. The road is planned to be commissioned by September 2021. On the road is also conducted the construction of 10 underground crossings and 4 road bridges.
