= Qoçəhmədli =

- Location within Azerbaijan Location within Karabakh Economic Region
- Coordinates: 39°32′06″N 47°07′35″E
- Country: Azerbaijan
- District: Fuzuli
- Time zone: UTC+4 (AZT)

Qoçəhmədli (also, Ghouchahmedli and Kochakhmedli) is a village in the Fuzuli District of Azerbaijan. It was occupied by the self-proclaimed Republic of Artsakh since the First Nagorno-Karabakh war until its recapture by Azerbaijan on 17 October 2020.

== Notable natives ==
- Gochag Askarov, folk singer and piano player

== See also ==
- Gochahmadli Mosque
