= Garakopaktapa =

Middle Bronze Age settlement in Azerbaijan

Coordinates: 39.6117°N 47.1526°E

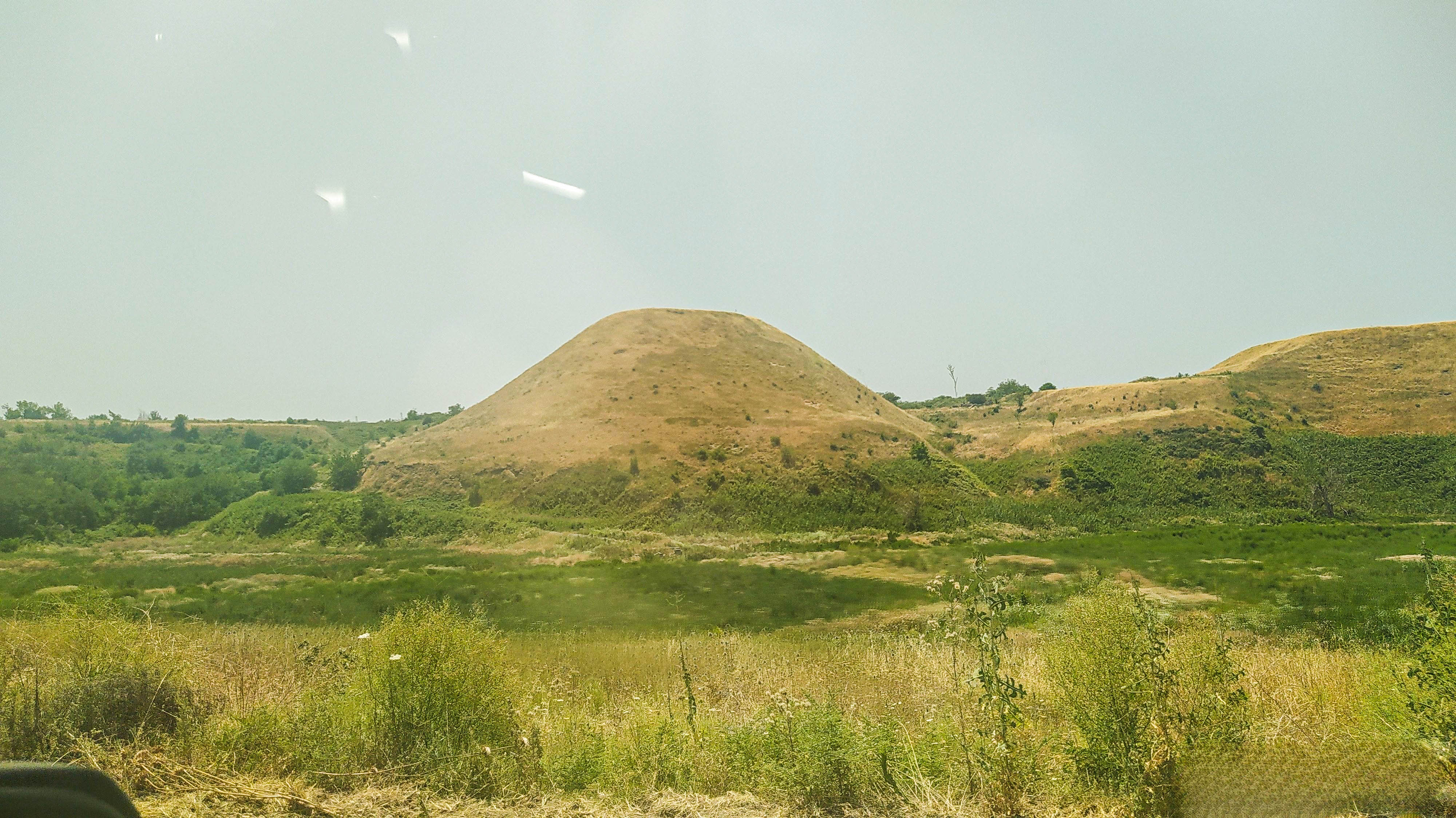
- Interactive map of Garakopaktapa
- Location: Fuzuli Rayon, Azerbaijan
- Type: Settlement
- Completion date: Bronze Age

Garakopaktapa (Armenian: Գարակոպակտապա; Azerbaijani: Qaraköpəktəpə) is an ancient multilayer settlement of the Middle Bronze Age epoch, located in a basin of the Guruchay and Kondalanchay Rivers, near Fuzuli Rayon, Azerbaijan.

The monument was discovered by Azerbaijani archaeologist Gudrat Ismayilov during 1961–1971 excavations. Items of material culture of the Middle Bronze Age, which began in Karabakh from the second half of the 3rd millennium BC were found out. Various collected materials characterize the culture of the tribes lived in the Mil-Karabakh steppe during that period.

Ismayilov ascribed the Garabulag kurgan cemetery located on the right coast of the Kondalan River and investigated in 1898 by Alexei Ivanovski, to this settlement.
