= Goi Domain =

Domain in feudal Japan

Goi Domain (五井藩, Goi-han) was a feudal domain under the Tokugawa shogunate of the Edo period, located in, Kazusa Province (modern-day Chiba Prefecture), Japan. The domain was centered on what is now the city of Ichihara, Chiba. It was ruled for the entirety of its history by a branch of the Arima clan. The site of the Goi Domain jin'ya is now Goi Station on the JR-East Uchibō Line.

== History ==
Goi Domain was created on November 28, 1781, when Arima Ujiyoshi, the daimyō of Nishijo Domain in Ise Province relocated his jin'ya from Ise to Kazusa. He died two years later, at the age of 23, and his successors likewise had unusually short lifespans. His son Ujiyasu died at the age of 29, successor Hiroyasu at age 35 and son Ujisada at age 24. The 5th daimyō of Goi Domain, Arima Ujishige, decided to relocate his residence to Fukiage Domain in Kōzuke Province on April 17, 1842, and Goi Domain was thus dissolved.

As with most domains in the han system, Goi Domain consisted of several discontinuous territories calculated to provide the assigned kokudaka, based on periodic cadastral surveys and projected agricultural yields.

== List of daimyō ==
- Arima clan (fudai) 1781-1842

#	Name	Tenure	Courtesy title	Court Rank	kokudaka
1	Arima Ujiyoshi (有馬氏恕)	1781–1783	Hyogo-no-kami (兵庫頭)	Lower 5th (従五位下)	10,000 koku
2	Arima Ujiyasu (有馬氏保)	1783–1790	Bingo-no-kami (備後守)	Lower 5th (従五位下)	10,000 koku
3	Arima Hisayasu (有馬久保)	1790–1814	Bingo-no-kami (備後守)	Lower 5th (従五位下)	10,000 koku
4	Arima Ujisada (有馬氏貞)	1814–1833	Hyogo-no-kami (兵庫頭)	Lower 5th (従五位下)	10,000 koku
5	Arima Ujishige (有馬氏郁)	1833–1842	Bingo-no-kami (備後守)	Lower 5th (従五位下)	10,000 koku
