= Nagaura Station (Chiba) =

Railway station in Sodegaura, Chiba Prefecture, Japan

Nagaura Station 長浦駅
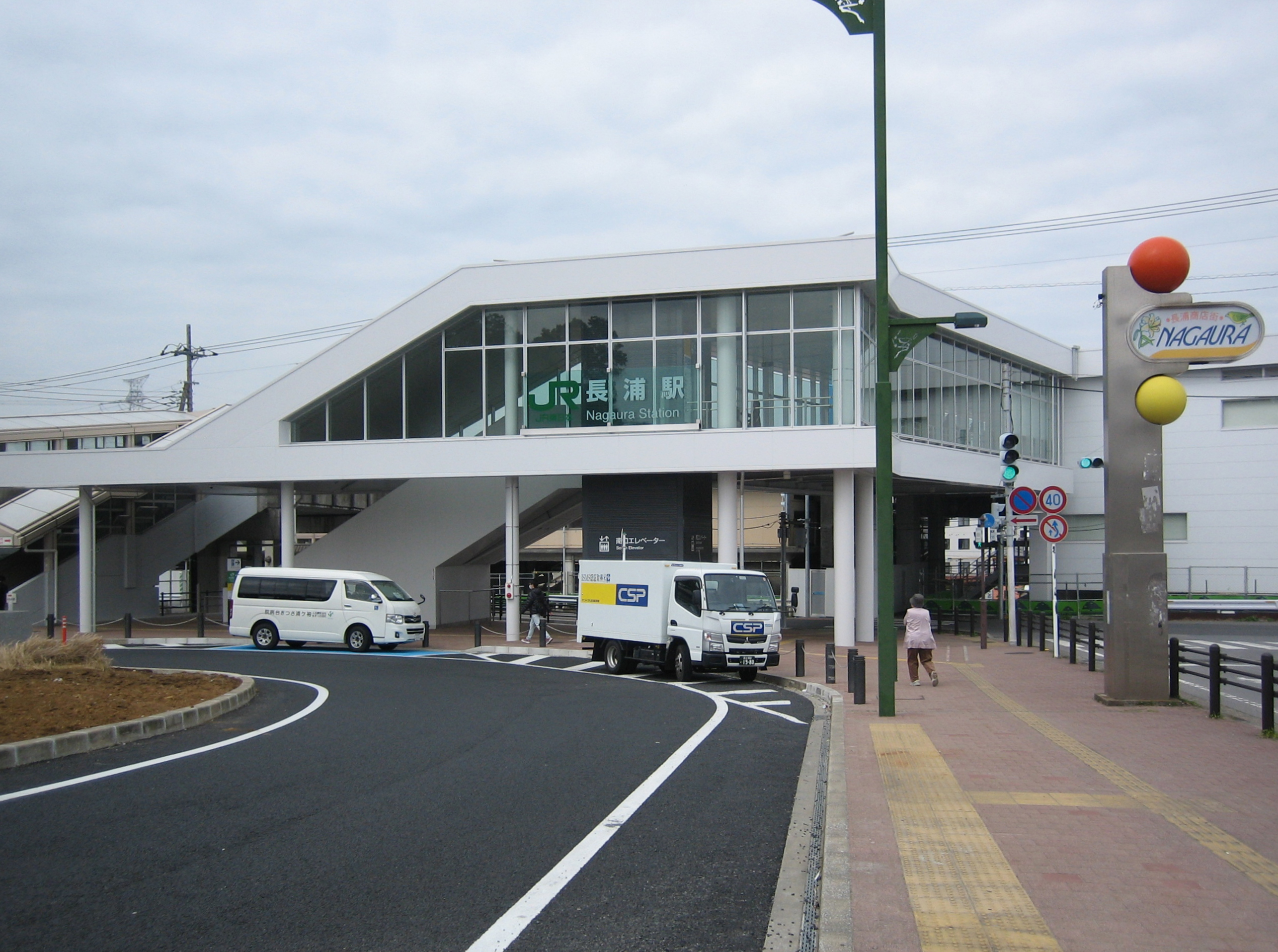
- Nagaura Station south side, March 2014

General information
- Location: Kuranami, Sodegaura-shi, Chiba-ken 299-0243; Japan
- Coordinates: 35°27′01″N 139°59′43″E
- Operator: JR East
- Line: ■ Uchibō Line
- Distance: 20.5km from Soga
- Platforms: 1 island platform

Other information
- Status: Staffed
- Website: Official website

History
- Opened: January 10, 1947

Passengers
- FY2019: 6084

Services
Preceding station	JR East	Following station
Anegasaki towards Soga	Uchibō Line Keiyō Rapid	Sodegaura towards Kazusa-Minato
Anegasaki towards Chiba	Uchibō Line Sobū Rapid	Sodegaura towards Kimitsu
Anegasaki towards Soga or Chiba	Uchibō Line Local	Sodegaura towards Awa-Kamogawa
Location
- Location within Chiba Prefecture Location within Japan

Nagaura Station (長浦駅, Nagaura-eki) is a passenger railway station in the city of Sodegaura, Chiba Prefecture, Japan, operated by the East Japan Railway Company (JR East).

== Lines ==
Nagaura Station is served by the Uchibo Line, and lies 20.5 km from the starting point of the Uchibo Line at Soga Station.

== Layout ==
The station consists of a single island platform serving two tracks, connected to the wooden station building by a footbridge. The station is staffed.

=== Platforms ===
1	■ Uchibo Line	for Kimitsu, Kisarazu, Tateyama, and Awa-Kamogawa
2	■ Uchibō Line	for Goi and Chiba

== History ==
Nagaura Station opened on January 10, 1947, as a station on the Japanese National Railways (JNR) Bōsōnishi Line. The line was renamed the Uchibō Line from July 15, 1972. The Nagaura Station was absorbed into the JR East network upon the privatization of JNR on April 1, 1987.

== Passenger statistics ==
In fiscal 2019, the station was used by an average of 6084 passengers daily (boarding passengers only).

== Surrounding area ==
- National Route 16
- Nagaura Post Office

== See also ==
- List of railway stations in Japan
