= Hamano Station =

Railway station in Chiba, Japan

Hamano Station 浜野駅
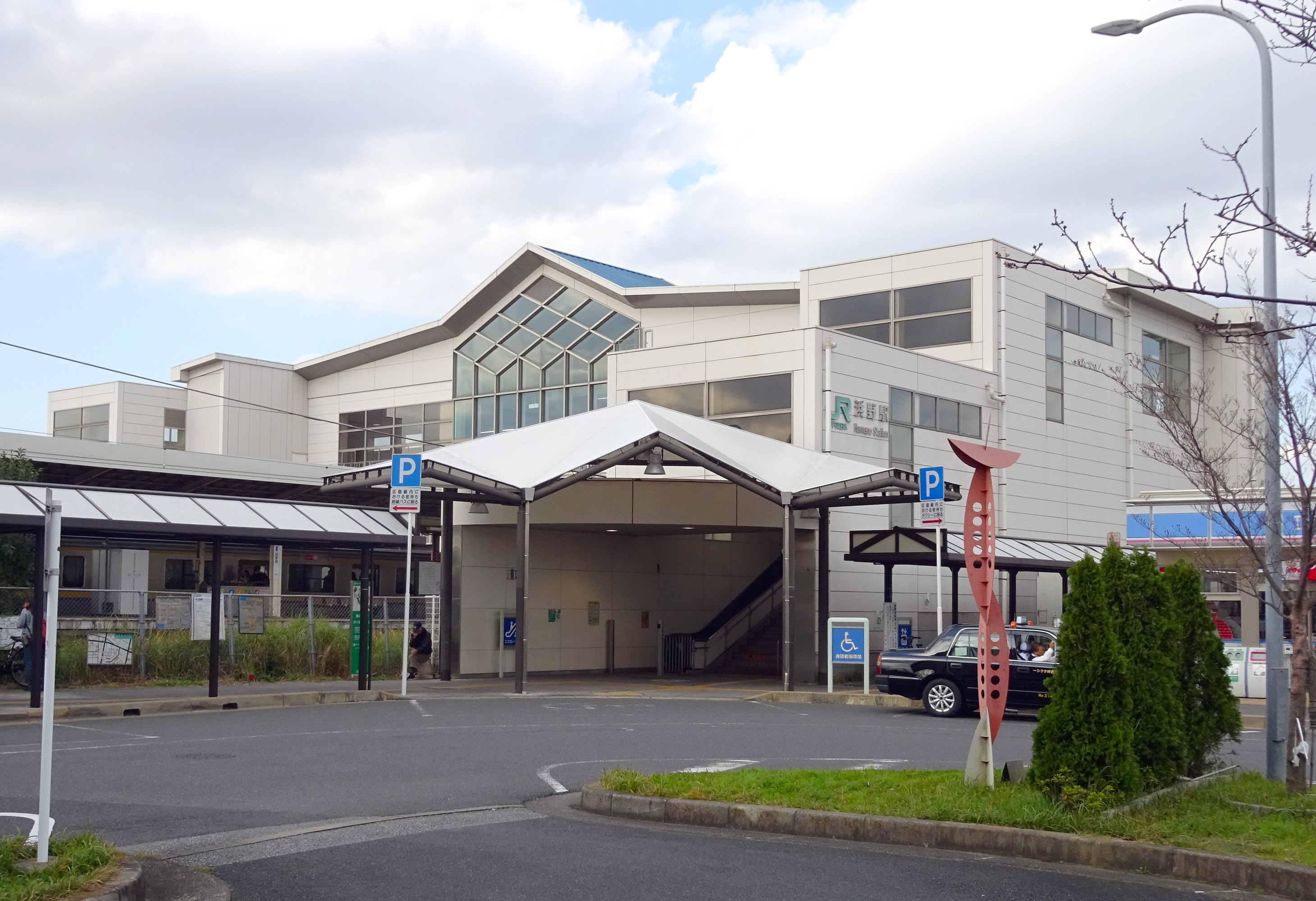
- East Exit of Hamano Station, November 2017

General information
- Location: Hamanochō 700, Chūō-ku, Chiba-shi, Chiba-ken 260-0824; Japan
- Coordinates: 35.5519°N 140.1323°E
- Operator: JR East
- Line: ■ Uchibō Line
- Distance: 43.0 km from Soga
- Platforms: 1 island platform

Other information
- Status: Staffed
- Website: Official website

History
- Opened: March 28, 1912

Passengers
- FY2019: 7519

Services
Preceding station	JR East	Following station
Soga Terminus	Uchibō Line Keiyō Rapid	Yawatajuku towards Kazusa-Minato
Soga towards Chiba	Uchibō Line Sobū Rapid	Yawatajuku towards Kimitsu
Soga towards Chiba	Uchibō Line Local	Yawatajuku towards Awa-Kamogawa
Location
- Location within Chiba Prefecture Location within Japan

Hamano station (浜野駅, Hamano-eki) is a passenger railway station located in Chūō-ku, Chiba, Chiba Prefecture, Japan, operated by the East Japan Railway Company (JR East).

== Lines ==
Hamano Station is served by the Uchibo Line, and is located 3.4 km from the starting point of the line at Soga Station.

== Station layout ==
The station is an above-ground station with an elevated station building, and has two sets of tracks running around an island platform. The station is attended.

=== Platforms ===
1	■ Uchibō Line	For Soga, Chiba, Tokyo
2	■ Uchibō Line	For Goi, Kisarazu, Kimitsu, Tateyama

== History ==
Hamano Station was opened on March 28, 1912 as a station on the Japanese Government Railways (JGR) Kisarazu Line. On May 24, 1919, the line's name changed to the Hōjō Line, and on April 15, 1929 to the Bōsō Line and on April 1, 1933 to the Bōsōnishi Line. It became part of the Japan National Railways (JNR) after World War II, and the line was renamed the Uchibō Line from July 15, 1972. Hamano Station was absorbed into the JR East network upon the privatization of the Japan National Railways (JNR) on April 1, 1987. After schedule changes from December 2007, express trains connecting directly to the Keiyō Line and Sōbu Line also stop at this station. The platform length was extended from November 2007 to facilitate stopping of high speed trains.

== Passenger statistics ==
In fiscal 2019, the station was used by an average of 7519 passengers daily (boarding passengers only).

== Surroundings ==
- National Route 16
- starting point of National Route 357
- Chiba Prefectural Oihama High School
- Chiba Municipal Oihama Elementary School
- Chiba Municipal Oihama West Elementary School
- Chiba Municipal Oihama East Elementary School
- Hamano Kindergarten

== See also ==
- List of railway stations in Japan
