= Sodegaura Station =

Railway station in Sodegaura, Chiba Prefecture, Japan

Sodegaura Station 袖ケ浦駅
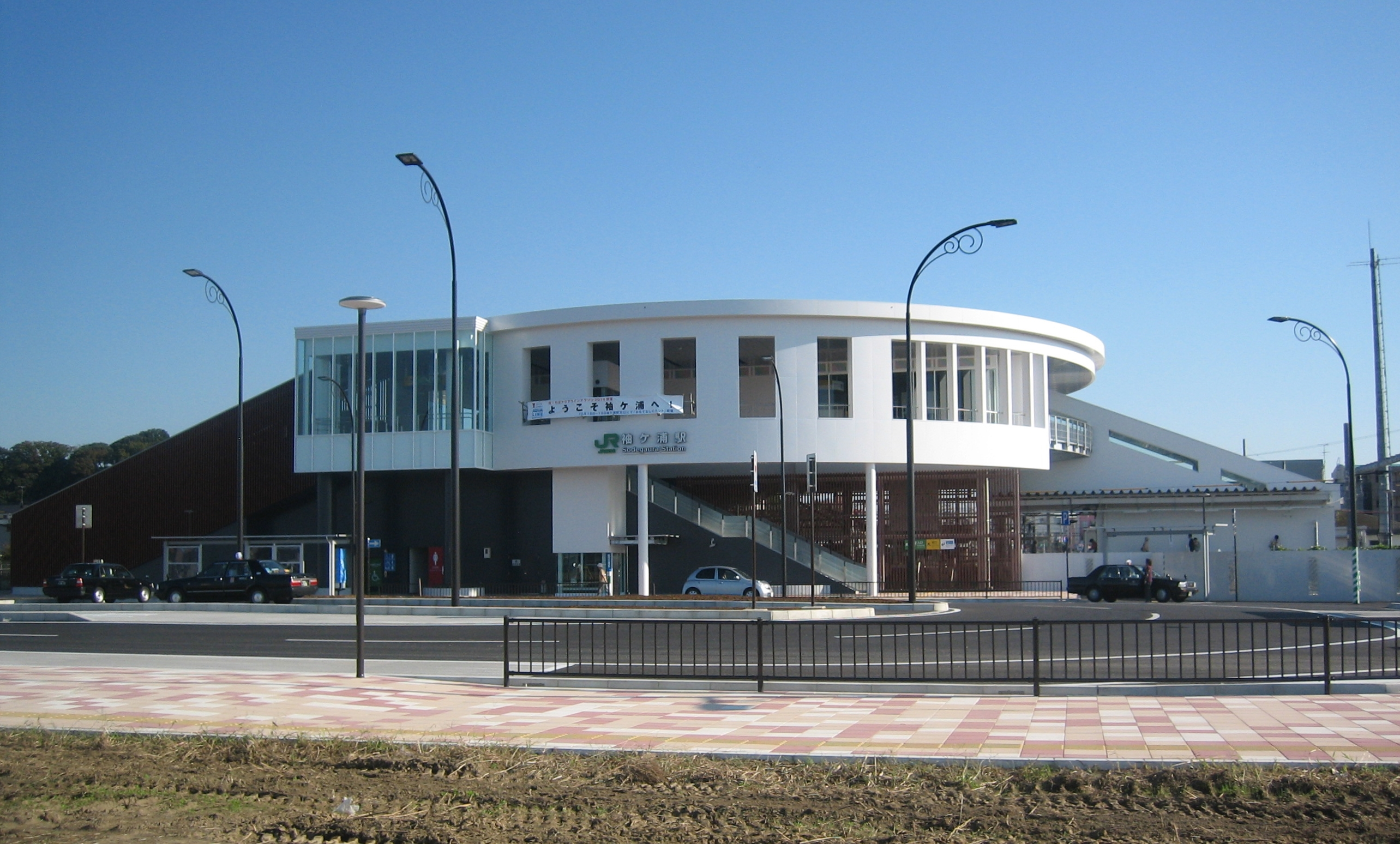
- The north side of Sodegaura Station, October 2014

General information
- Location: Narawa, Sodegaura-shi, Chiba-ken 299-0263; Japan
- Coordinates: 35.4320°N 139.9577°E
- Operator: JR East
- Line: ■ Uchibō Line
- Distance: 24.4 km from Soga
- Platforms: 1 island platform
- Tracks: 2

Other information
- Status: Staffed
- Website: Official website

History
- Opened: August 21, 1913
- Former names: Naraha (until 1974)

Passengers
- FY2019: 5615

Services
Preceding station	JR East	Following station
Nagaura towards Soga	Uchibō Line Keiyō Rapid	Iwane towards Kazusa-Minato
Nagaura towards Chiba	Uchibō Line Sobū Rapid	Kisarazu towards Kimitsu
Nagaura towards Soga or Chiba	Uchibō Line Local	Iwane towards Awa-Kamogawa
Location
- Location within Chiba Prefecture Location within Japan

Sodegaura Station (袖ケ浦駅, Sodegaura-eki) is a passenger railway station in the city of Sodegaura, Chiba Prefecture, Japan, operated by the East Japan Railway Company (JR East).

== Lines ==
Sodegaura Station is served by the Uchibo Line, and lies 24.4 kilometers from the terminus of the line at Soga Station.

== Station layout ==
The station consists of a single island platform serving two tracks, connected to the wooden station building by a footbridge. The station is staffed.

=== Platforms ===
1	■ Uchibo Line	for Kimitsu, Kisarazu, Tateyama, and Awa-Kamogawa
2	■ Uchibo Line	for Goi and Chiba

== History ==
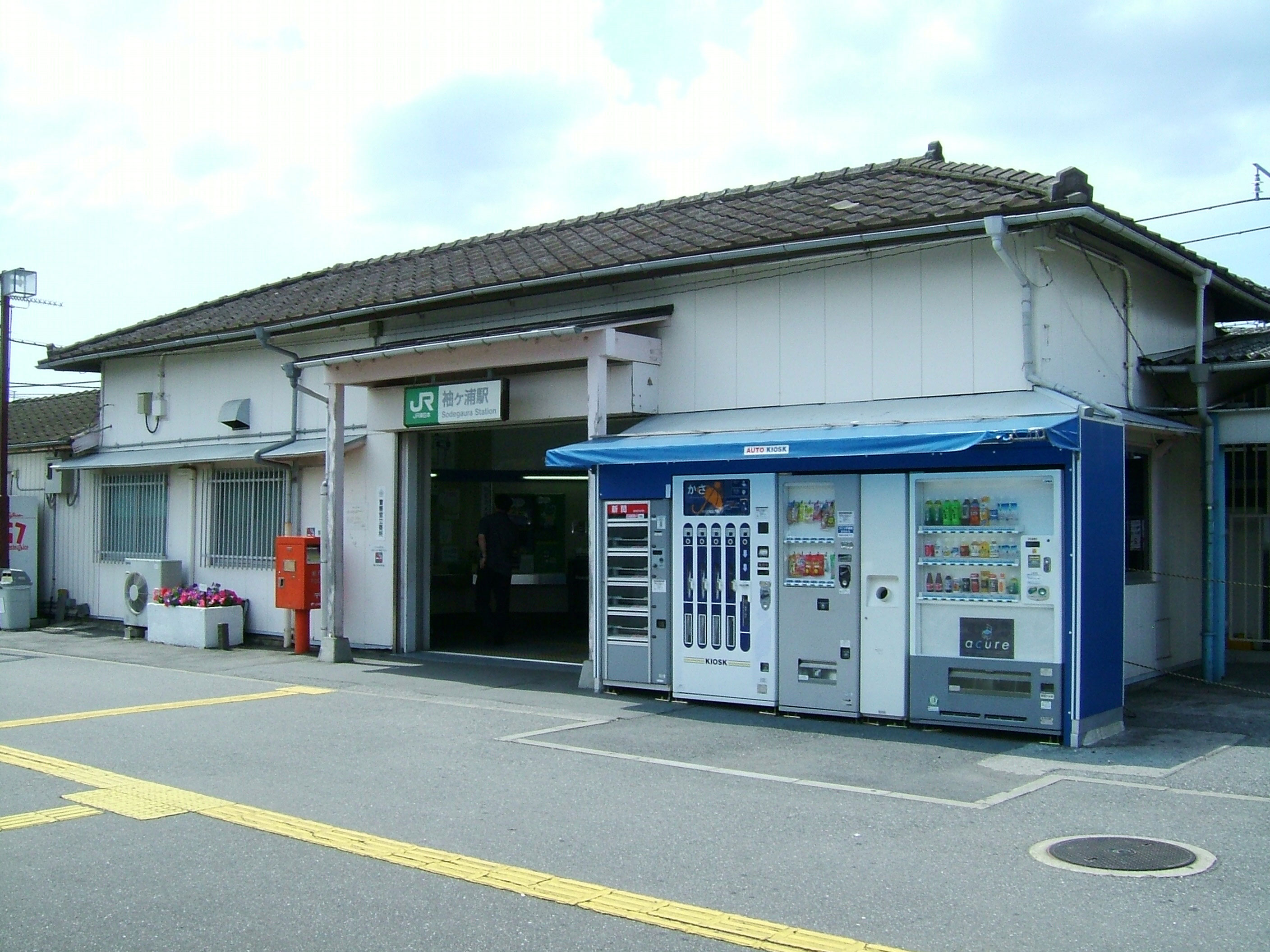
The station entrance in June 2008 before rebuilding

The station opened on August 21, 1913, as Naraha Station (楢葉駅) on the Japanese Government Railways (JGR) Kisarazu Line. On May 24, 1919, the line became the Hōjō Line, on April 15, 1929, it became the Bōsō Line, and on April 1, 1933, it became the Bōsōnishi Line. It became part of the Japanese National Railways (JNR) after World War II, and the line was renamed the Uchibō Line from July 15, 1972. The station assumed its present name from March 31, 1974. Sodegaura Station was absorbed into the JR East network upon the privatization of JNR on April 1, 1987.

== Passenger statistics ==
In fiscal 2019, the station was used by an average of 5615 passengers daily (boarding passengers only).

== Surrounding area ==
- National Route 16
- Sodegaura City Hall

== See also ==
- List of railway stations in Japan
