= Anegasaki Station =

Railway station in Ichihara, Chiba Prefecture, Japan

Anegasaki Station 姉ケ崎駅
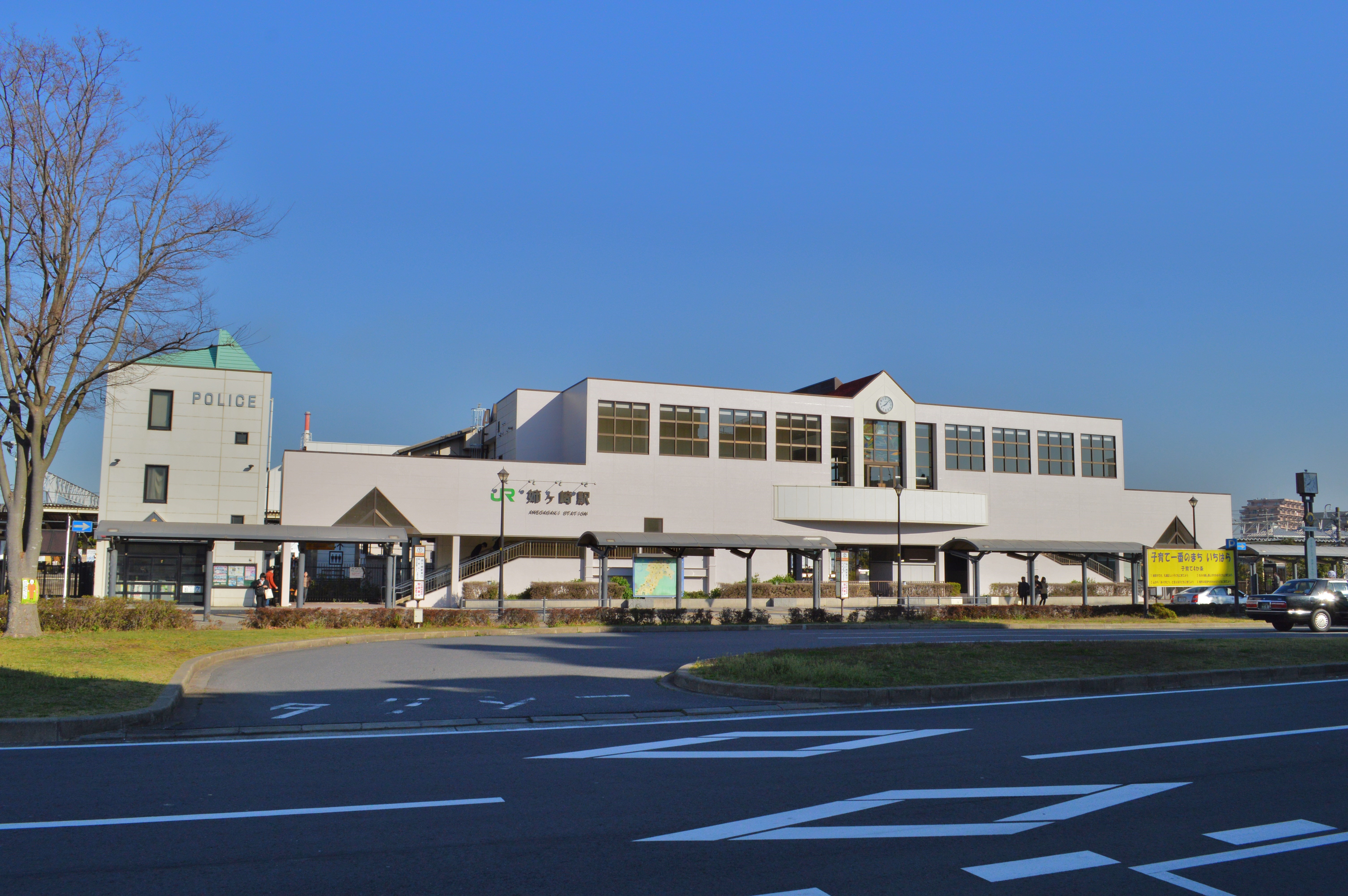
- Anegasaki Station in March 2016

General information
- Location: 528-2 Anesaki, Ichihara-shi, Chiba-ken 299-0111; Japan
- Coordinates: 35.4786°N 140.0416°E
- Operator: JR East
- Line: ■ Uchibō Line
- Distance: 15.1 km from Soga
- Platforms: 2 island platforms

Other information
- Status: Staffed (Midori no Madoguchi)
- Website: Official website

History
- Opened: March 28, 1912

Passengers
- FY2019: 10,113

Services
Preceding station	JR East	Following station
Goi towards Tokyo	Sazanami (limited service)	Kisarazu towards Kimitsu
Goi towards Soga	Uchibō Line Keiyō Rapid	Nagaura towards Kazusa-Minato
Goi towards Chiba	Uchibō Line Sobū Rapid	Nagaura towards Kimitsu
Goi towards Soga or Chiba	Uchibō Line Local	Nagaura towards Awa-Kamogawa
Location
- Location within Chiba Prefecture Location within Japan

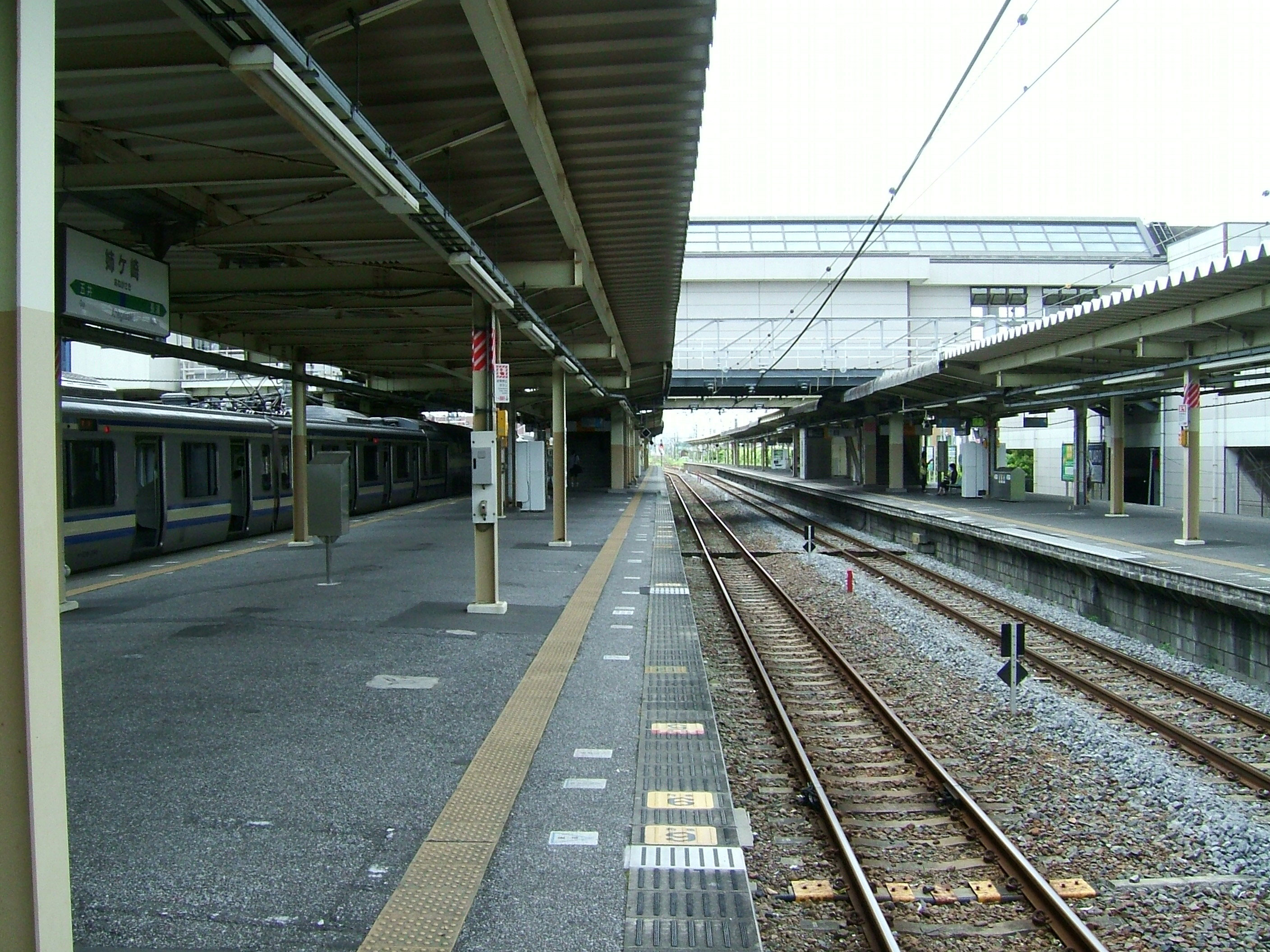
the platforms

Anegasaki station (姉ケ崎駅, Anegasaki-eki) is a passenger railway station in the city of Ichihara, Chiba Prefecture, Japan, operated by the East Japan Railway Company (JR East).

== Lines ==
Anegasaki Station is served by the Uchibo Line, and lies 15.1 kilometers from the terminus of the line at Soga Station.

== Station layout ==
The station consists of two island platforms with an elevated station building. The station has a Midori no Madoguchi staffed ticket office. The station has shunts between northbound and southbound tracks which are used during busy periods by trains connected to Tsudanuma and Tokyo which have Anegasaki as their terminus.

=== Platforms ===
1	■ Uchibō Line	For Goi, Kisarazu
2	■ Uchibō Line	For Chiba, Tokyo

== History ==
Station was opened on March 28, 1912 as a station on the Japanese Government Railways (JGR) Kisarazu Line. On May 24, 1919, the line's name changed to the Hōjō Line, and on April 15, 1929 to the Bōsō Line and on April 1, 1933 to the Bōsōnishi Line. It became part of the Japan National Railways (JNR) after World War II, and the line was renamed the Uchibō Line from July 15, 1972. The station was absorbed into the JR East network upon the privatization of the Japan National Railways (JNR) on April 1, 1987.

== Passenger statistics ==
In fiscal 2019, the station was used by an average of 10,113 passengers daily (boarding passengers only).

== Surroundings ==
To the east is the Kominato Railway and the Nittō Kōtsū Bus. The Nittō Kōtsū Bus can also be found on the west side operating with eight buses per day on holidays and weekdays. Kominato taxis as well as taxis from other companies can be found on both sides. The Kominato Tetsudō Bus is bound for Aobadai via Teikyo University Ichihara Hospital, while the Nittō Kōtsū Bus runs to various other places. Anegasaki-kōen Soccer Field, the JEF United Ichihara Chiba soccer team practice ground, is a 15-minute walk from the station. Since November 1, 2005 an Aobadai Community Bus running from the east exit to Dia Palace Aobadai via Teikyo University Ichihara Hospital has been in operation.

== See also ==
- List of railway stations in Japan
