= Yawatajuku Station =

Railway station in Ichihara, Chiba Prefecture, Japan

Yawatajuku Station 八幡宿駅
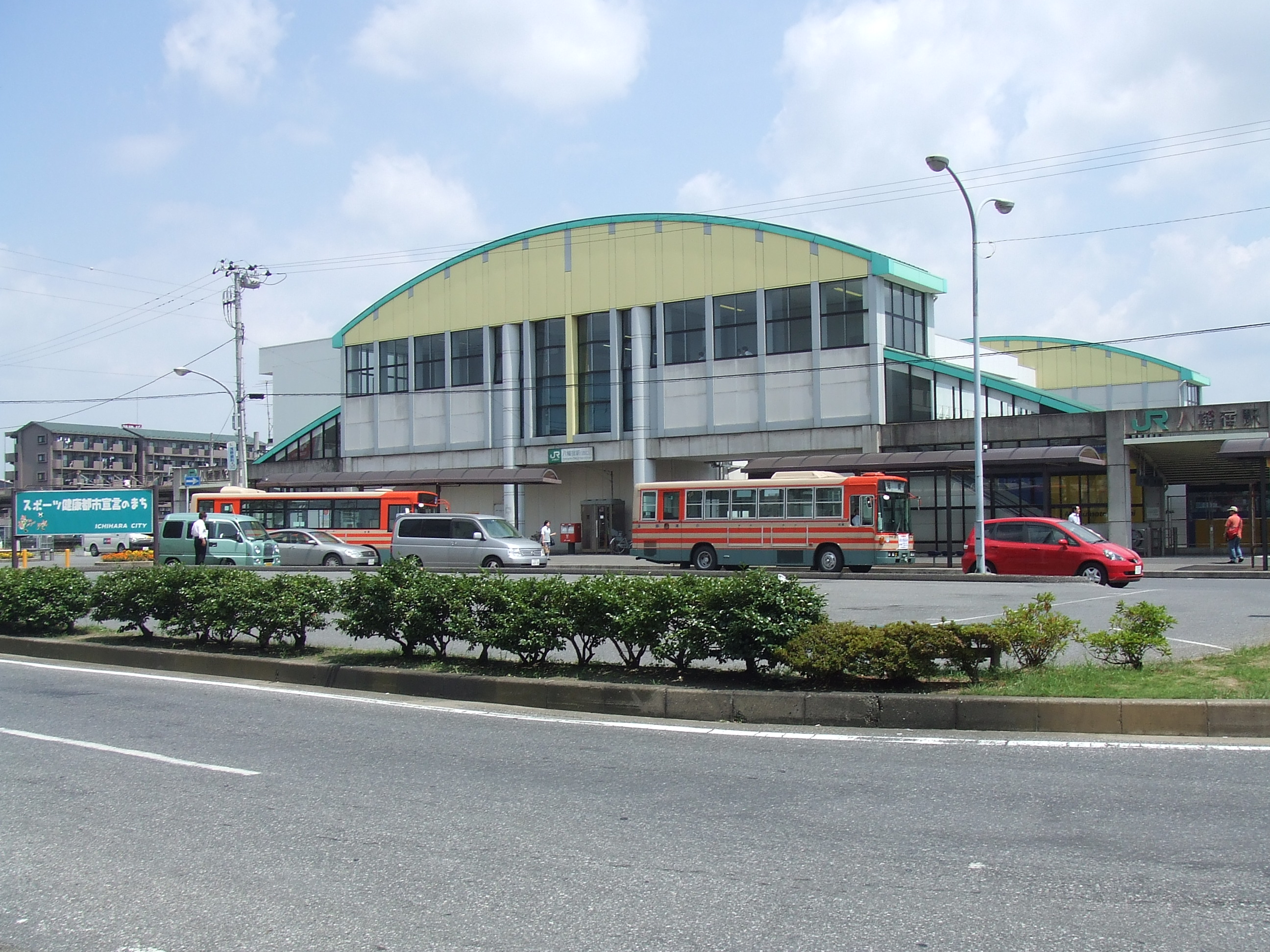
- Yawatajuku Station in July 2008

General information
- Location: Yawatajuku 930-3, Ichihara, Chiba-ken 290-0062; Japan
- Coordinates: 35.5360°N 140.1201°E
- Operator: JR East
- Line: ■ Uchibō Line
- Distance: 5.6 km from Soga
- Platforms: 1 island platform

Other information
- Status: Staffed
- Website: Official website

History
- Opened: March 28, 1912

Passengers
- FY2019: 11,905

Services
Preceding station	JR East	Following station
Hamano towards Soga	Uchibō Line Keiyō Rapid	Goi towards Kazusa-Minato
Hamano towards Chiba	Uchibō Line Sobū Rapid	Goi towards Kimitsu
Hamano towards Soga or Chiba	Uchibō Line Local	Goi towards Awa-Kamogawa
Location
- Location within Chiba Prefecture Location within Japan

Yawatajuku station (八幡宿駅, Yawatajuku-eki) is a passenger railway station in the city of Ichihara, Chiba Prefecture, Japan, operated by the East Japan Railway Company (JR East).

== Lines ==
Yawatajuku Station is served by the Uchibo Line, and lies 5.6 kilometers from the terminus of the line at Soga Station.

== Station layout ==
The station consists of an elevated station building, and has two sets of tracks running around an island platform. The station is staffed.

=== Platforms ===
1	■ Uchibō Line	For Soga, Chiba, Tokyo
2	■ Uchibō Line	For Goi, Kisarazu

== History ==
Yawatajuku Station was opened on March 28, 1912 as a station on the Japanese Government Railways (JGR) Kisarazu Line. On May 24, 1919, the line's name changed to the Hōjō Line, and on April 15, 1929 to the Bōsō Line and on April 1, 1933 to the Bōsōnishi Line. It became part of the Japan National Railways (JNR) after World War II, and the line was renamed the Uchibō Line from July 15, 1972. The station assumed its present name from March 31, 1974. Yawatajuku Station was absorbed into the JR East network upon the privatization of the Japan National Railways (JNR) on April 1, 1987.

== Passenger statistics ==
In fiscal 2019, the station was used by an average of 11,905 passengers daily (boarding passengers only).

== Surroundings ==
- Ichihara Police Station
- Teikyo Heisei University
- Yawata Junior High School
- Yawata Elementary School
- National Route 16
- National Route 297
- Ichihara Sporeku Park
- Port Pier Ichihara

== See also ==
- List of railway stations in Japan
