= Itabu Station =

Railway station in Ichihara, Chiba Prefecture, Japan

Coordinates: 35°19′14.44″N 140°08′32.04″E

Itabu Station 飯給駅
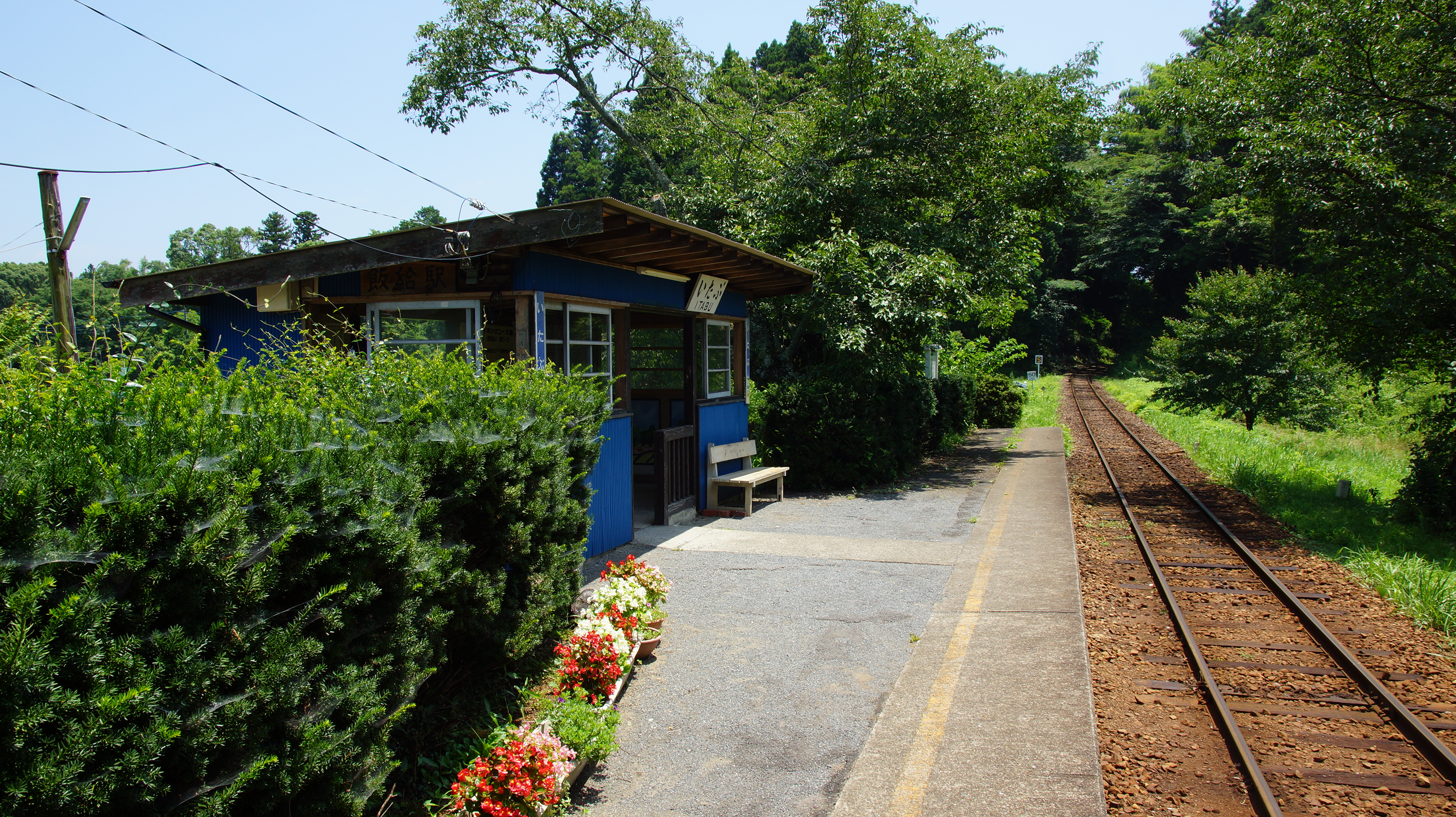
- The station platform and waiting room in July 2015

General information
- Location: Ichihara, Chiba; Japan
- Operator: Kominato Railway
- Line: Kominato Line

History
- Opened: 1926

Passengers
- FY2010: 6 daily

Services
Preceding station	Kominato Railway	Following station
Satomi towards Goi	Kominato Line	Tsukizaki towards Kazusa-Nakano
Location

Itabu Station (飯給駅, Itabu-eki) is a railway station on the Kominato Line in Ichihara, Chiba, Japan, operated by the third-sector railway operator Kominato Railway.

== Lines ==
Itabu Station is served by the Kominato Railway Kominato Line, and lies 27.5 km from the western terminus of the line at Goi Station.

== Station layout ==
Itabu Station has a single side platform serving bidirectional traffic. The station is unstaffed, but there is a small shelter on the platform.

=== Platforms ===
-	■ Kominato Line	for Kazusa-Ushiku and Goi for Kazusa-Nakano

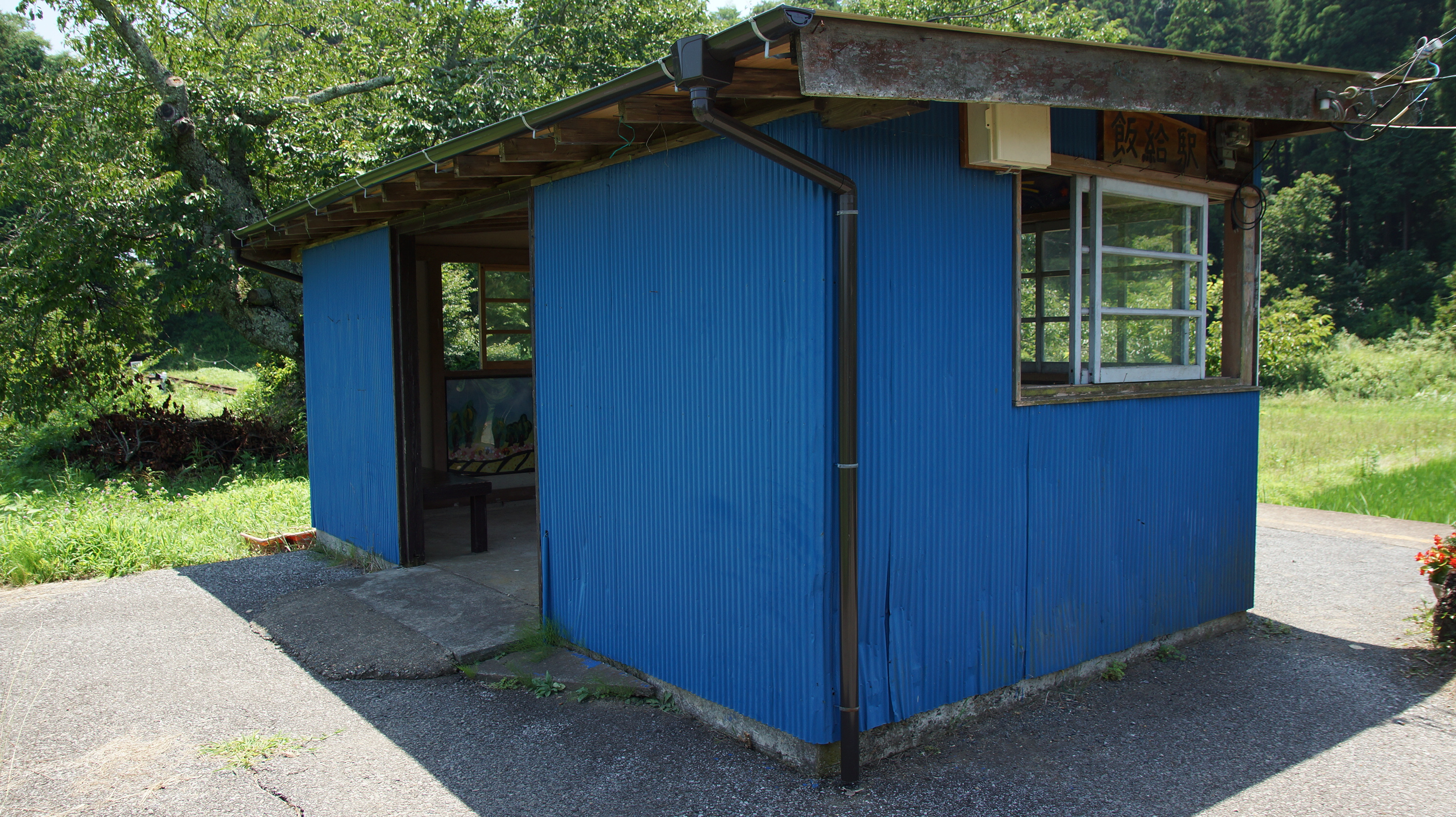
The station waiting room, July 2015

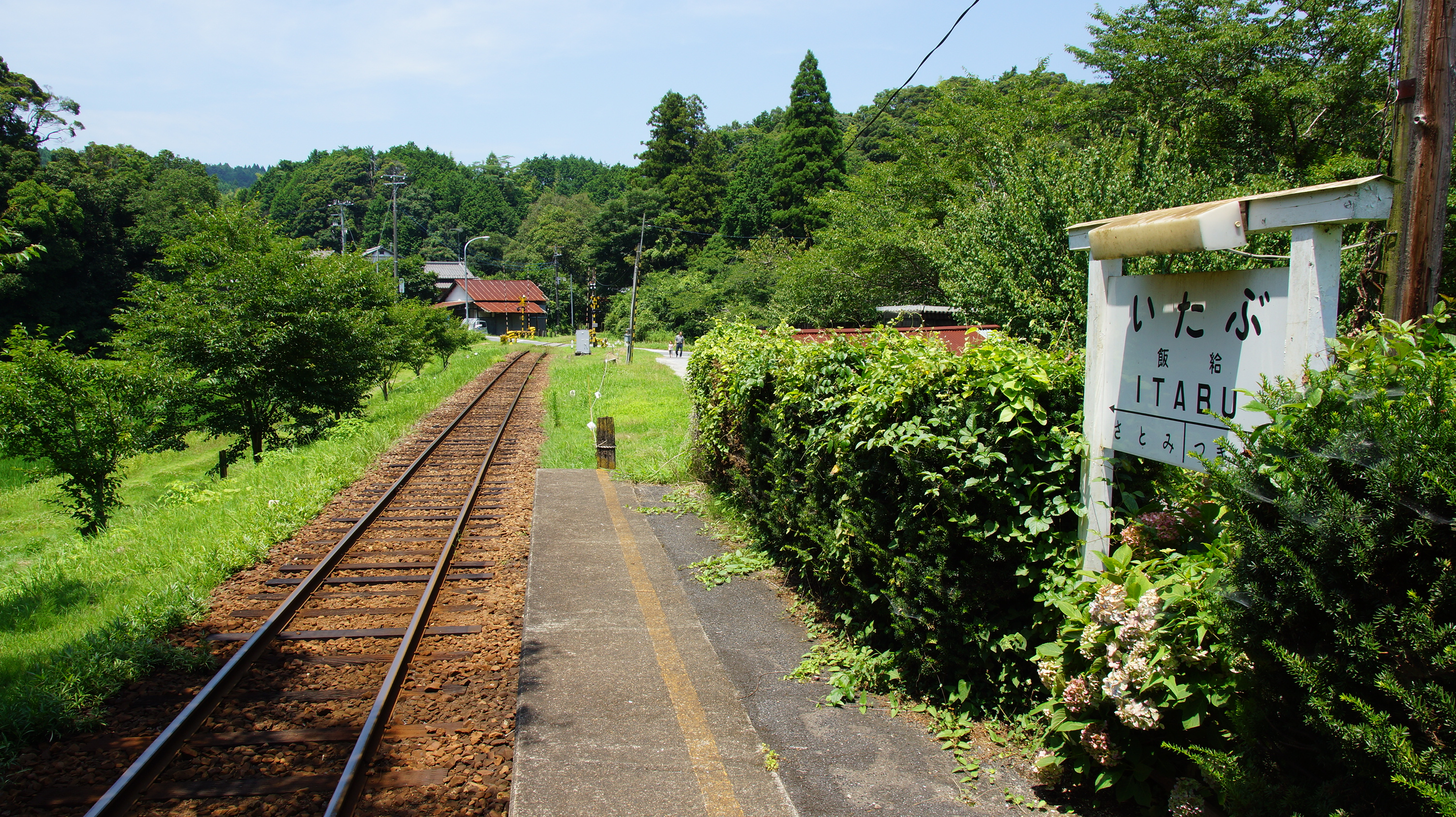
The view from the platform looking northward, July 2015

== History ==
Itabu Station opened on September 1, 1926. It has been unstaffed since 5 January 1956.

== Passenger statistics ==
In fiscal 2010, the station was used by an average of 6 passengers daily (boarding passengers only).

== Surrounding area ==
Adjacent to the station is what is dubbed "the largest public lavatory in the world". Designed by Japanese architect Sou Fujimoto and completed in 2012, the facility for women only consists of a single glass toilet cubicle located inside a 200 square metre enclosure.

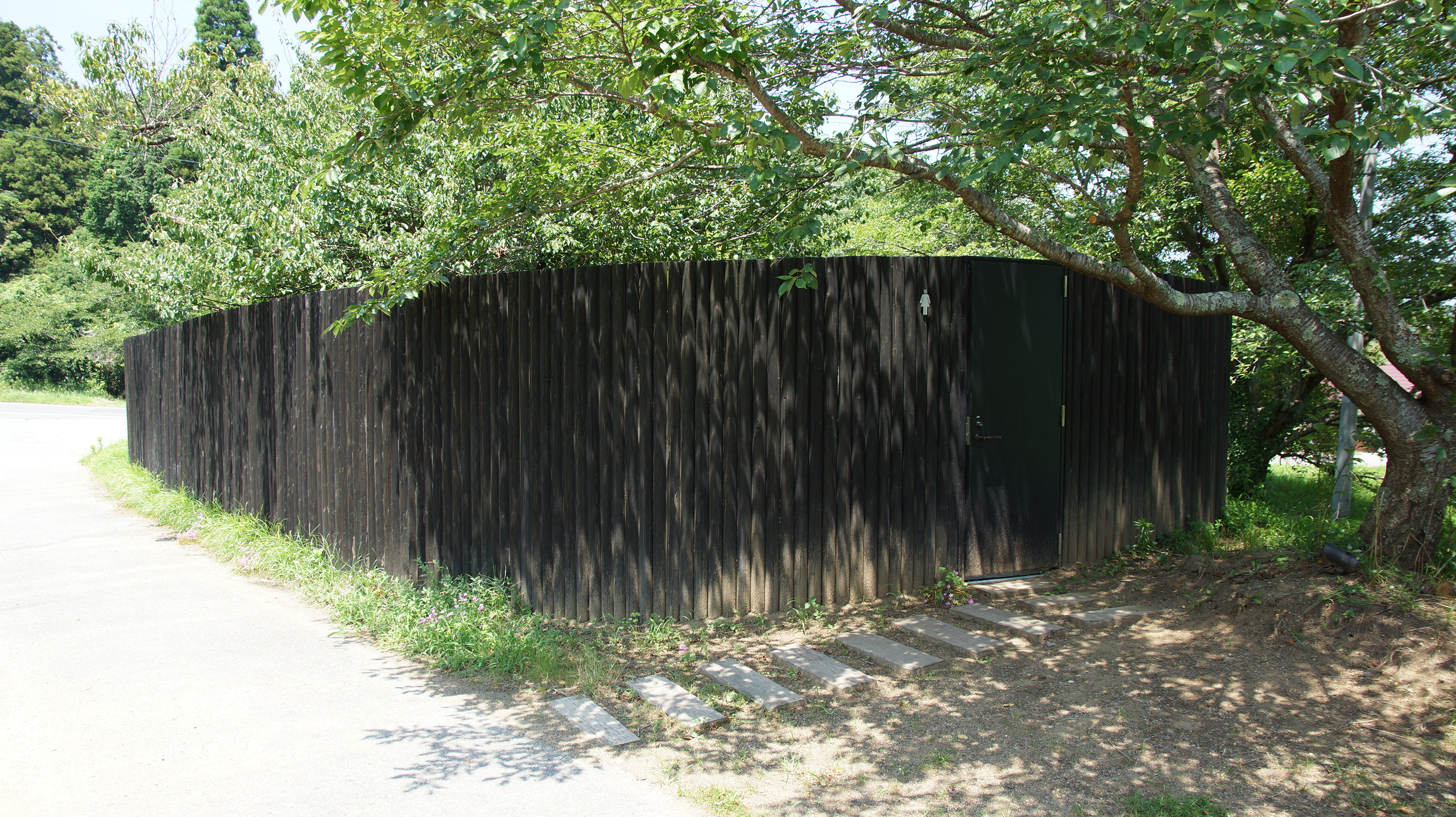
The enclosure surrounding the women's toilet, July 2015

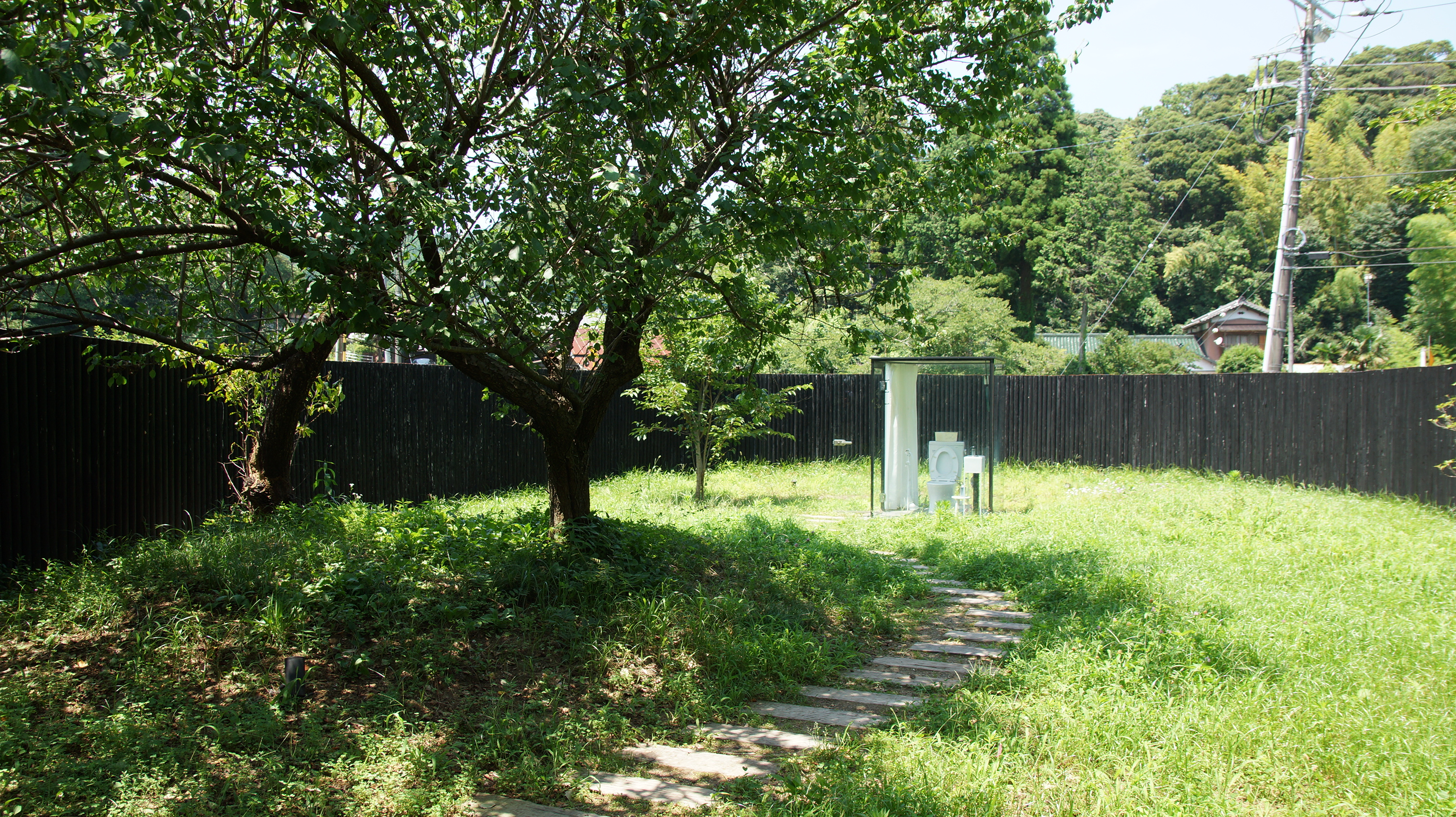
Inside the women's toilet, July 2015

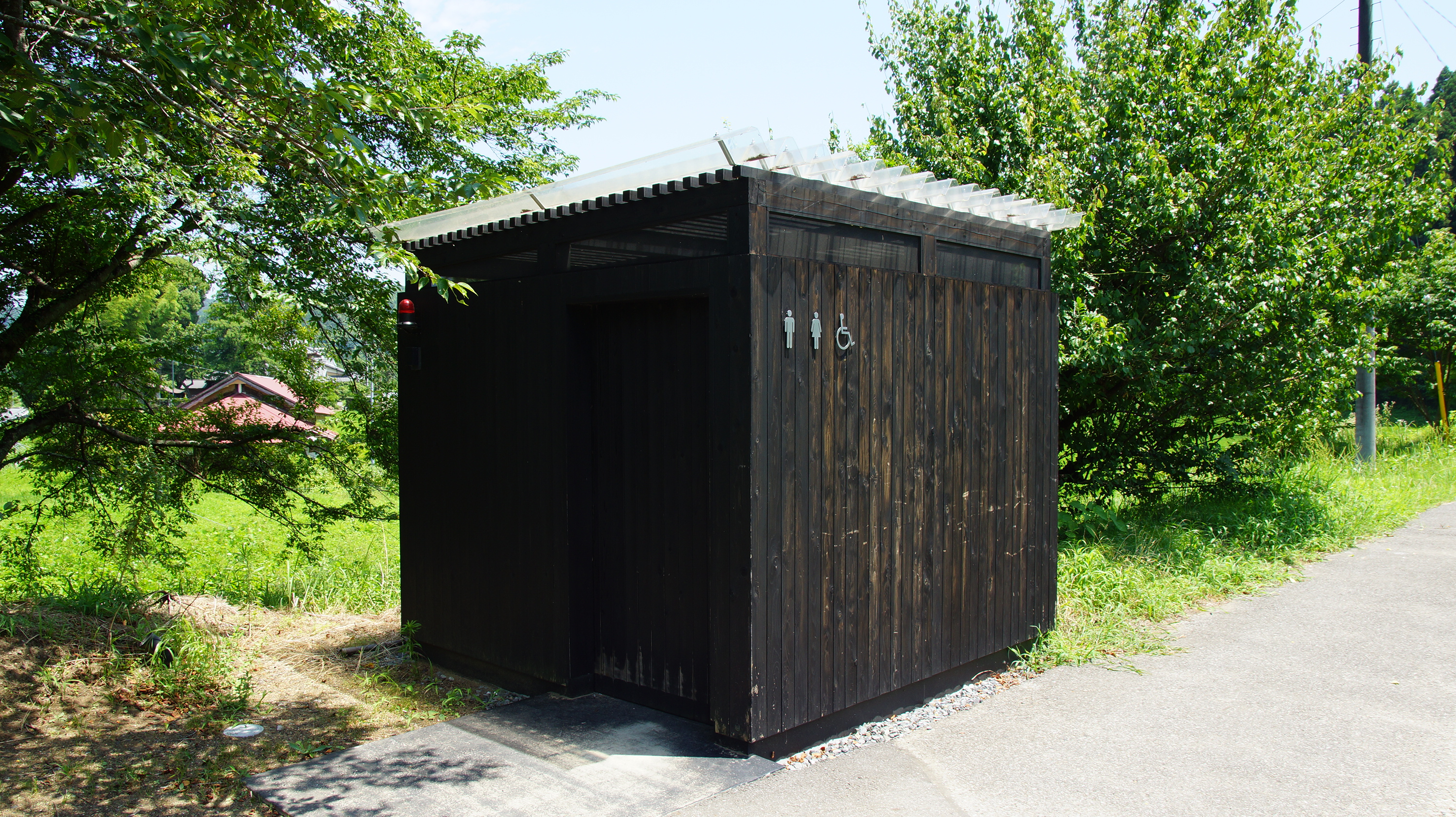
The unisex toilet, July 2015

== See also ==
- List of railway stations in Japan
