= Sodegaura =

City in Kantō, Japan

Sodegaura 袖ヶ浦市
- City
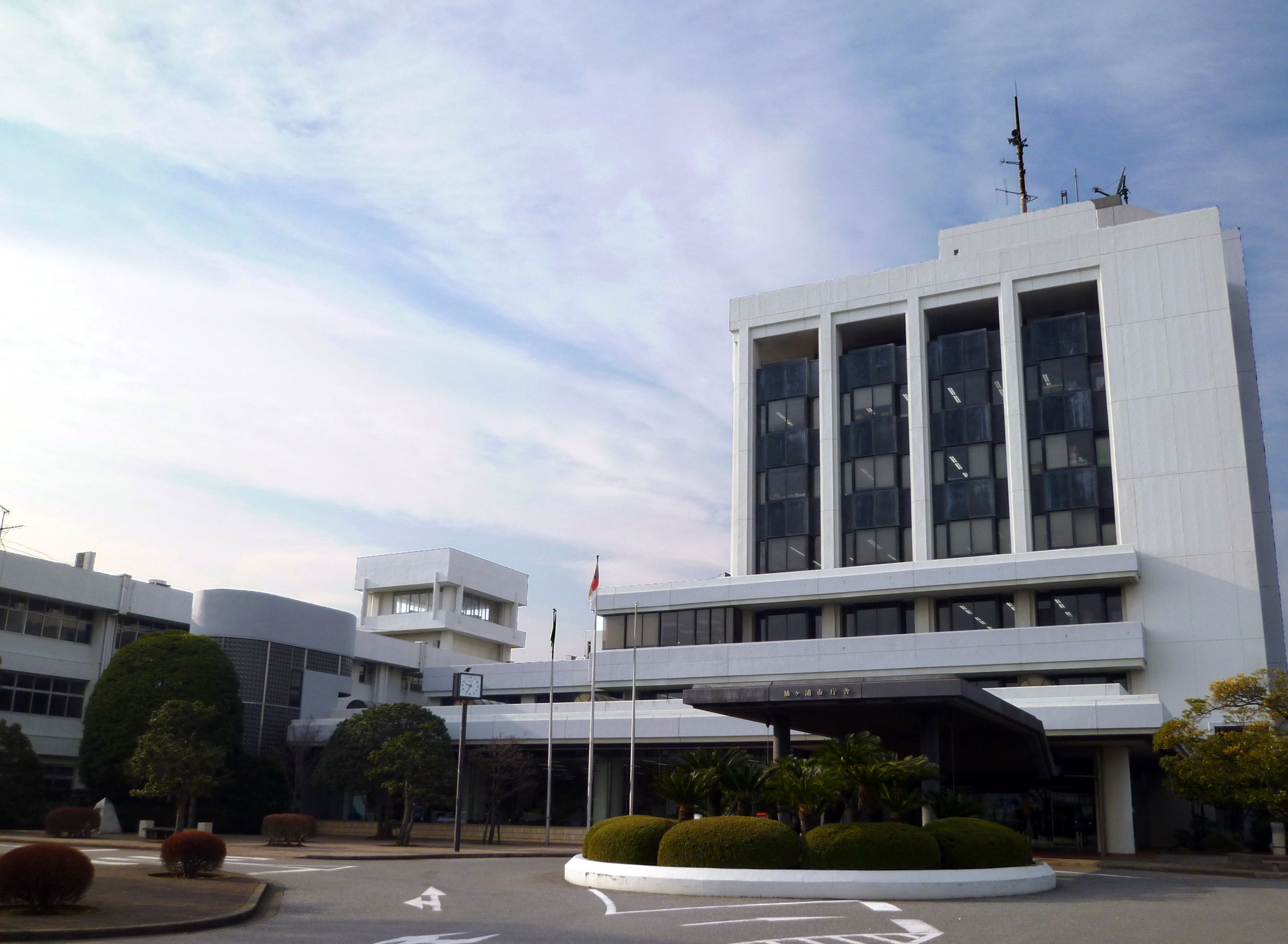
- Sodegaura City Hall

- Flag Seal

- Location of Sodegaura in Chiba Prefecture

- Coordinates: 35°25′48″N 139°57′15.9″E
- Country: Japan
- Region: Kantō
- Prefecture: Chiba

Government
  - Mayor: Tomohiro Kasuya (since November 2019)

Area
  - Total: 94.93 km^{2} (36.65 sq mi)

Population (November 1, 2020)
  - Total: 64,901
  - Density: 683.7/km^{2} (1,771/sq mi)
- Time zone: UTC+9 (Japan Standard Time)
- Symbols
  - Tree: Castanopsis
  - Flower: Lilium auratum
  - Bird: Japanese bush-warbler
- Phone number: 0438-62-2111
- Address: 1-1 Sakato Ichiba, Sodegaura-shi, Chiba-ken 299-0292
- Website: Official website

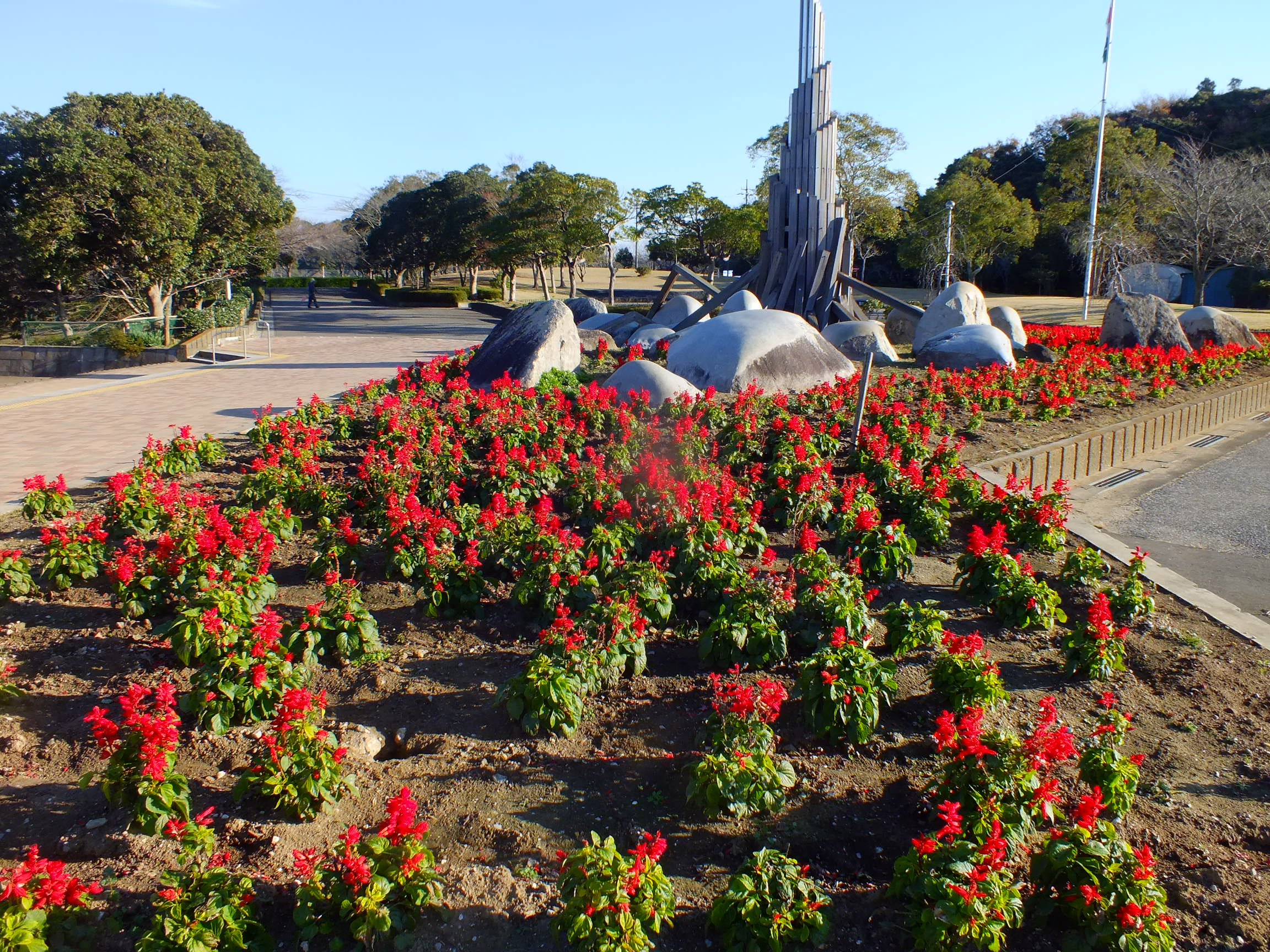
Sodegaura park

Sodegaura (袖ヶ浦市, Sodegaura-shi) is a city located in Chiba Prefecture, Japan. As of 1 November 2020, the city had an estimated population of 64,901 in 28,156 households and a population density of 680 persons per km^{2}. The total area of the city is 94.92 square kilometres (36.65 sq mi).

== Geography ==
Sodegaura located in the central western Chiba prefecture, about 25 kilometers from the prefectural capital at Chiba, and within 30 to 40 kilometers from central Tokyo. The city is on the Kantō Plain and faces Tokyo Bay to the west with a 28.7 kilometer shoreline. The shoreline is mostly reclaimed land with an industrial area centered on the petrochemical complex; then main urban area is also on the coast, centered on Sodegaura Station. The city measures approximately 14.0 kilometers from east to west and 13.5 kilometers from north to south.

=== Surrounding municipalities ===
Chiba Prefecture

- Ichihara
- Kisarazu

=== Climate ===
Sodegaura has a humid subtropical climate (Köppen Cfa) characterized by warm summers and cool winters with light to no snowfall. The average annual temperature in Sodegaura is 15.3 °C. The average annual rainfall is 1584 mm with September as the wettest month. The temperatures are highest on average in August, at around 26.4 °C, and lowest in January, at around 5.4 °C.

== Demographics ==
Per Japanese census data, the population of Sodegaura has increased over the past 60 years.

Historical population
| Year | Pop. | ±% |
|---|---|---|
| 1950 | 25,222 | — |
| 1960 | 24,992 | −0.9% |
| 1970 | 25,500 | +2.0% |
| 1980 | 38,837 | +52.3% |
| 1990 | 52,818 | +36.0% |
| 2000 | 58,593 | +10.9% |
| 2010 | 60,355 | +3.0% |
| 2020 | 63,883 | +5.8% |

== History ==
Sodegaura is mentioned in the Nara period chronicle Kojiki in connection with the Yamatotakeru mythology, and at that time applied to the entire western coastline of the Bōsō Peninsula. Modern Sodegaura was part of Kimitsu District from the Meiji period. Sodegaura Town was formed on March 31, 1955, from the merger of the town of Shōwa with the neighboring village of Nagaura and a portion of the village of Negata. It expanded through merger with the town of Hirakawa on November 3, 1971. On April 1, 1991, it was elevated to city status.

== Government ==
Sodegaura has a mayor-council form of government with a directly elected mayor and a unicameral city council of 22 members. Sodegaura contributes one member to the Chiba Prefectural Assembly. In terms of national politics, the city is part of Chiba 12th district of the lower house of the Diet of Japan.

== Economy ==
Sodegaura is an important part of the Keiyō Industrial Zone. The industrial Port of Chiba ranges from Funabashi in the north to Sodegaura in the south. Heavy industry, especially oil refineries and chemical processing, is located on reclaimed land in the city.

Sodegaura is the site of one of the Tokyo Bay area's five major liquefied natural gas terminals, which is jointly operated by Tokyo Gas and Tokyo Electric Power Company.

== Education ==
Sodegaura has seven public elementary schools and five public middle schools operated by the city government, and one public high school operated by the Chiba Prefectural Board of Education. The prefecture also operates one special education school for the handicapped.

== Culture ==
A stretch of bayside highway in Sodegaura along Tokyo Bay is colloquially known as "Chibafornia," a portmanteau of Chiba and California, due to its resemblance to Southern California. The area has been used for television commercial and music video filming.

== Transportation ==
=== Railway ===
JR East – Uchibō Line

- Nagaura - Sodegaura

JR East – Kururi Line

- Yokota - Higashi-Yokota

=== Highway ===
- Tokyo Bay Aqua-Line
- Ken-Ō Expressway
- Tateyama Expressway
- National Route 16
- National Route 409
- National Route 410

=== Air ===
The city does not have an airport. The nearest airports are:

- Haneda Airport, located 28 km (17 mi) north west which is easily accessible by crossing over the Tokyo Bay Aqua-Line.
- Narita International Airport, located 85 km (53 mi) north east of Sodegaura.

== Sister cities ==
- Itajaí, Brazil, from January 31, 1979

== Notable people from Sodegaura ==
- Nozomi Hiroyama, professional soccer player
