= Soai-kai =

Yakuza group in Chiba, Japan

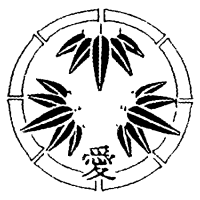
Daimon of Soai-kai

The Soai-kai (双愛会, Sōai-kai) is a yakuza organization based in Chiba, Japan. The Soai-kai is a designated yakuza group with an estimated 80 active members.

== History ==
The Soai-kai was formed in 1945 by Toramatsu Takahashi, then a member of a Yokohama-based bakuto group named the Sasada-ikka. Originally named the "Gyosui-kai" (魚水会) as an affiliate of the Sasada-ikka, the group was renamed the "Takatora-gumi" (高寅組) and again renamed the Soai-kai in 1955 when the group became independent from the Sasada-ikka.

== Condition ==
Headquartered in Ichihara, Chiba, the Soai-kai is one of the three dominating yakuza groups in Chiba Prefecture, along with the Sumiyoshi-kai and the Inagawa-kai.
