= Ichihara, Chiba =

Ichihara 市原市
- City
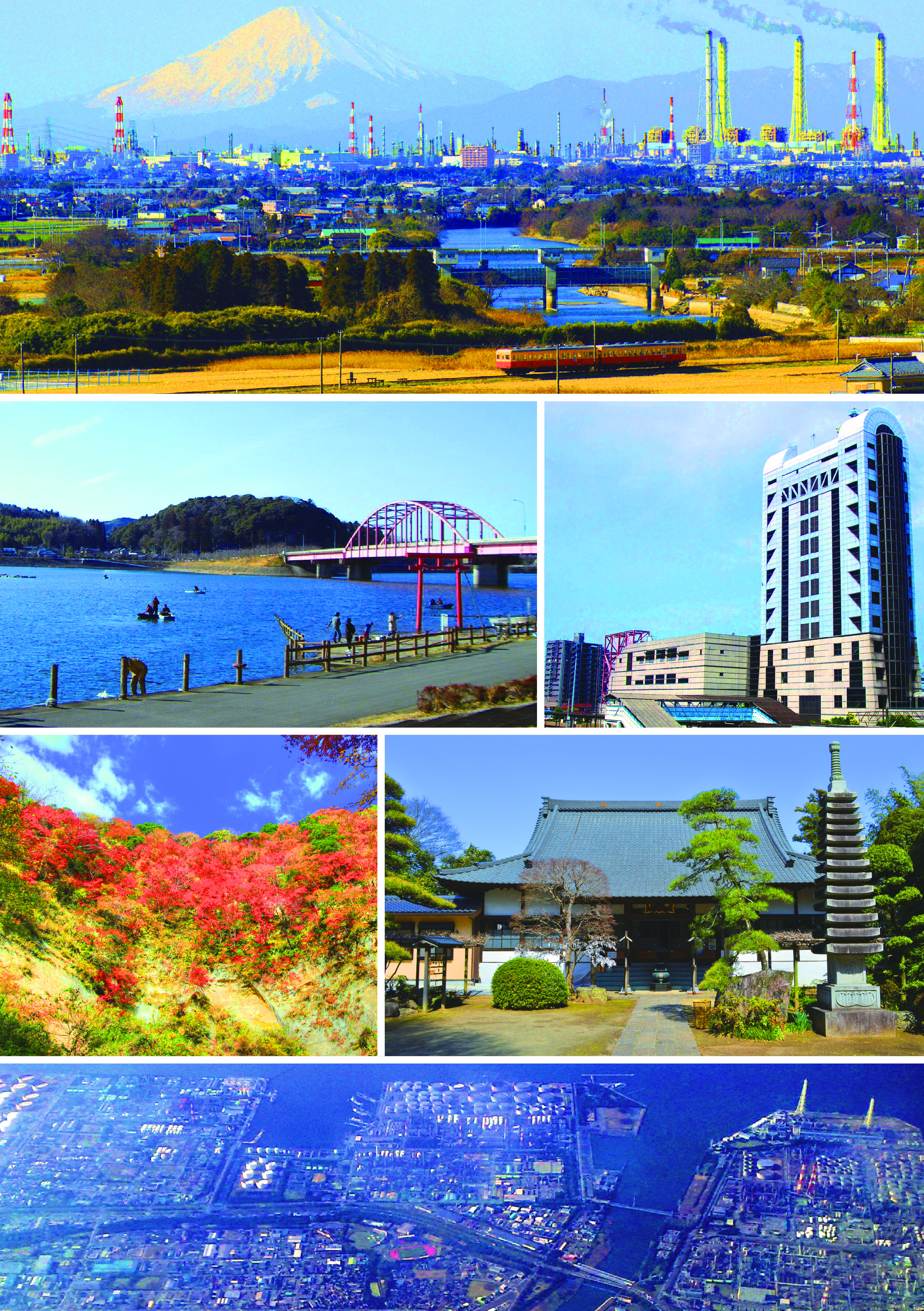
Kominato Line, Keiyō Industrial Zone & Mount Fuji
Takataki Dam	Sunplaza Ichihara
Umegase Gorge	Kazusa Kokubun-ji
Chiba Port district 4：Goi・Anegasaki
- Flag Seal

- Location of Ichihara in Chiba Prefecture

- Coordinates: 35°29′53″N 140°06′55.6″E
- Country: Japan
- Region: Kantō
- Prefecture: Chiba
- First official recorded: mid 3rd century (official)
- Goi town settled: May 20, 1891
- Ichihara town settled: March 31, 1955
- Both town merged and city settled: May 1, 1963

Government
  - Mayor: Joji Koide (since June 2015)

Area
  - Total: 368.17 km^{2} (142.15 sq mi)

Population (December 1, 2020)
  - Total: 274,117
  - Density: 744.54/km^{2} (1,928.3/sq mi)
- Time zone: UTC+9 (Japan Standard Time)
- Phone number: 0436-22-1111
- Address: 1-1-1 Kokubunjidai Chūō, Ichihara-shi, Chiba-ken 290-8501
- Climate: Cfa
- Website: Official website
- Symbols
- Bird: Japanese bush-warbler
- Flower: Cosmos
- Tree: Ginkgo biloba

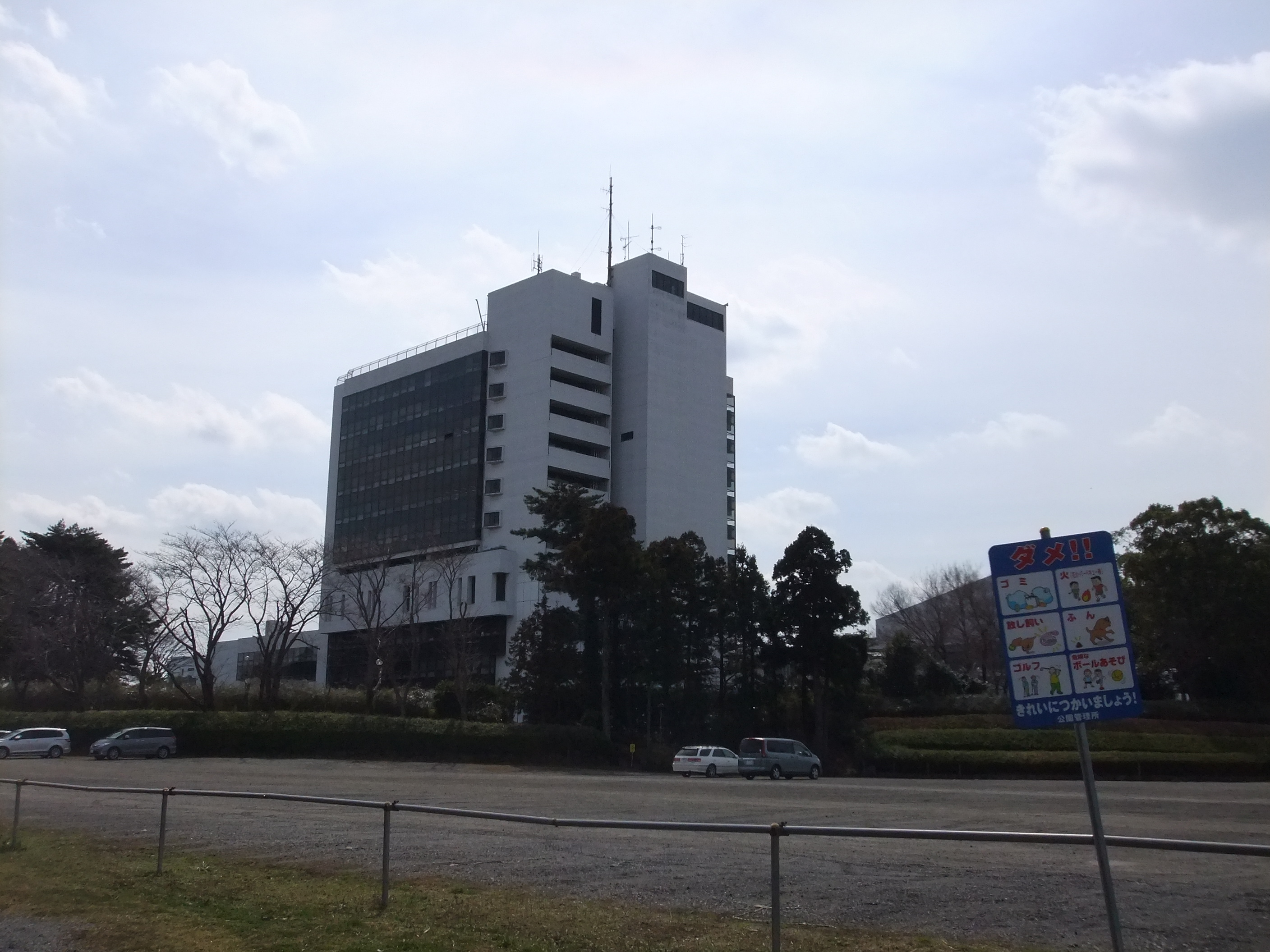
Ichihara City Hall

Ichihara (市原市, Ichihara-shi; Japanese pronunciation: [ì.c̟͡ɕi̥.hä̀.ɾä̀, -hä́.ɾä̀, -hä́.ɾä́.ɕì]) is a city, located in Chiba Prefecture, Japan. As of 1 December 2020, the city had an estimated population of 274,117 in 128,316 households and a population density of 240 people per km^{2}. The total area of the city is 368.20 square kilometres (142.16 sq mi). The city is home, together with the city of Chiba, to the JEF United football club. The whole city is also part of the Greater Tokyo Area.

== Geography ==
Ichihara is located in the western part of the Bōsō Peninsula, and geographically is the largest of Chiba Prefecture's cities and towns. The south is a mountainous area connected to the Boso hills. The highly industrialized northern part of the city faces Tokyo Bay. Ichihara, dense in housing developments, serves as a satellite town of Tokyo and Chiba City.

=== Surrounding municipalities ===
Chiba Prefecture

- Chiba (Chūō-ku, Midori-ku)
- Chōnan
- Kimitsu
- Kisarazu
- Mobara
- Nagara
- Ōtaki
- Sodegaura

=== Climate ===
Ichihara has a humid subtropical climate (Köppen Cfa) characterized by warm summers and cool winters with light to no snowfall. The average annual temperature in Ichihara is 15.1 °C (59.2 °F). The average annual rainfall is 1,673.1 mm (65.87 in) with October as the wettest month. The temperatures are highest on average in August, at around 26.5 °C (79.7 °F), and lowest in January, at around 4.1 °C (39.4 °F).

Climate data for Ichihara (1991−2020 normals, extremes 1978−present)
Month	Jan	Feb	Mar	Apr	May	Jun	Jul	Aug	Sep	Oct	Nov	Dec	Year
Record high °C (°F)	21.1 (70.0)	24.6 (76.3)	27.5 (81.5)	30.0 (86.0)	35.7 (96.3)	36.5 (97.7)	40.2 (104.4)	39.2 (102.6)	37.5 (99.5)	33.8 (92.8)	26.4 (79.5)	24.3 (75.7)	40.2 (104.4)
Mean daily maximum °C (°F)	10.5 (50.9)	11.3 (52.3)	14.4 (57.9)	19.5 (67.1)	23.7 (74.7)	26.1 (79.0)	30.3 (86.5)	31.8 (89.2)	27.7 (81.9)	22.4 (72.3)	17.6 (63.7)	12.9 (55.2)	20.7 (69.2)
Daily mean °C (°F)	4.1 (39.4)	5.2 (41.4)	8.6 (47.5)	13.7 (56.7)	18.2 (64.8)	21.3 (70.3)	25.4 (77.7)	26.5 (79.7)	22.9 (73.2)	17.3 (63.1)	11.8 (53.2)	6.6 (43.9)	15.1 (59.2)
Mean daily minimum °C (°F)	−1.5 (29.3)	−0.6 (30.9)	2.9 (37.2)	8.0 (46.4)	13.1 (55.6)	17.3 (63.1)	21.5 (70.7)	22.5 (72.5)	19.0 (66.2)	13.0 (55.4)	6.6 (43.9)	1.1 (34.0)	10.2 (50.4)
Record low °C (°F)	−8.0 (17.6)	−9.2 (15.4)	−5.7 (21.7)	−2.4 (27.7)	3.3 (37.9)	8.0 (46.4)	11.7 (53.1)	14.3 (57.7)	7.7 (45.9)	1.8 (35.2)	−3.1 (26.4)	−7.0 (19.4)	−9.2 (15.4)
Average precipitation mm (inches)	82.4 (3.24)	74.0 (2.91)	138.0 (5.43)	132.5 (5.22)	130.4 (5.13)	170.6 (6.72)	151.8 (5.98)	114.8 (4.52)	237.1 (9.33)	256.8 (10.11)	113.9 (4.48)	70.9 (2.79)	1,673.1 (65.87)
Average precipitation days (≥ 1.0 mm)	6.3	6.9	11.2	10.5	10.4	11.9	10.0	7.3	11.8	12.0	9.0	6.5	113.8
Mean monthly sunshine hours	182.0	158.4	160.8	172.1	170.1	117.3	159.2	192.0	135.7	126.4	142.2	162.9	1,879.2
Source: Japan Meteorological Agency

== History ==
The area of modern Ichihara is the center of ancient Kazusa province. The ruins of the Nara period Kazusa Kokubun-ji provincial temple have been found within the borders of Ichihara, although the exact location of the Nara-period provincial capital remains uncertain. During the Sengoku period, the area was contested between the Chiba clan to the north, and the Satomi clan to the south. During the Edo period, the area was divided between Goi Domain, Tsurumaki Domain and large areas of tenryō territory controlled directly by the Tokugawa shogunate and administered by various hatamoto.

=== Timeline ===
- During the Meiji period, the area was reorganized into 171 villages under Ichihara District, Chiba Prefecture with the establishment of the modern municipalities system.
- In September 1923, the city was affected by Great Kanto earthquake.
- By 1945, these villages had been consolidated into five towns and 16 villages.
- Through further consolidation and mergers, the city of Ichihara was founded on May 1, 1963.
- On 1 October 1967, the neighboring town of Nansō, and village of Kamo were merged into Ichihara.
- On 11 March 2011, the city was struck by earthquake and tsunami and the subsequent Fukushima nuclear disaster, which causes of the natural gas storage tanks at the Cosmo oil refinery in Ichihara were set on fire by the earthquake.

== Government ==
Ichihara has a mayor-council form of government with a directly elected mayor and a unicameral city council of 32 members. Ichihara contributes four members to the Chiba Prefectural Assembly. In terms of national politics, the city is part of Chiba 3rd district of the lower house of the Diet of Japan.

== Demographics ==
Per Japanese census data, the population of Ichihara has recently plateaued after several decades of strong growth.

Historical population
Year	Pop.	±%
1920	68,825	—
1930	71,287	+3.6%
1940	75,069	+5.3%
1950	98,375	+31.0%
1960	94,309	−4.1%
1970	155,852	+65.3%
1980	216,394	+38.8%
1990	257,716	+19.1%
2000	278,218	+8.0%
2010	280,416	+0.8%
2020	269,524	−3.9%

== Economy ==
The city's economy is fueled by a large industrial complex overlooking Tokyo Bay. It contains the largest number of oil refineries in Japan, as well as power, petrochemical and shipbuilding companies.

== Education ==
- Teikyo Heisei University
- Ichihara has 41 public elementary schools and 21 public middle schools operated by the city government, and six public high schools operated by the Chiba Prefectural Board of Education. There are also one private elementary school and two private high schools. The prefecture also operates one special education school for the handicapped.

== Transportation ==
=== Railway ===
JR East – Uchibō Line

- Yawatajuku - Goi - Anegasaki

Keisei Electric Railway – Keisei Chihara Line

- Chiharadai

Kominato Railway – Kominato Line

- Goi - Kazusa-Murakami - Amaariki - Kazusa-Mitsumata - Kazusa-Yamada - Kōfūdai - Umatate - Kazusa-Ushiku - Kazusa-Kawama - Kazusa-Tsurumai - Kazusa-Kubo - Takataki - Satomi - Itabu - Tsukizaki - Kazusa-Ōkubo - Yōrōkeikoku

=== Highway ===
- Ken-Ō Expressway
- Tateyama Expressway
- National Route 16
- National Route 297
- National Route 409

== Sister cities ==
- Mobile, Alabama, United States, since November 10, 1993

== Crime and safety ==
The Soai-kai yakuza syndicate is headquartered in Ichihara. A designated yakuza group, the Soai-kai is one of the three dominating yakuza syndicates in Chiba Prefecture, along with the Sumiyoshi-kai and the Inagawa-kai.

== Notable people from Ichihara ==
- Chiaki, Singer
- Neko Hiroshi, Marathon Runner
- Hirotoshi Ishii, Baseball Player
- Katsushige Kawashima, Boxer
- Kohei Kudo, Soccer Player
- Suzuran Yamauchi, Tarento
