= Uchibō Line =

Railway line in Chiba prefecture, Japan

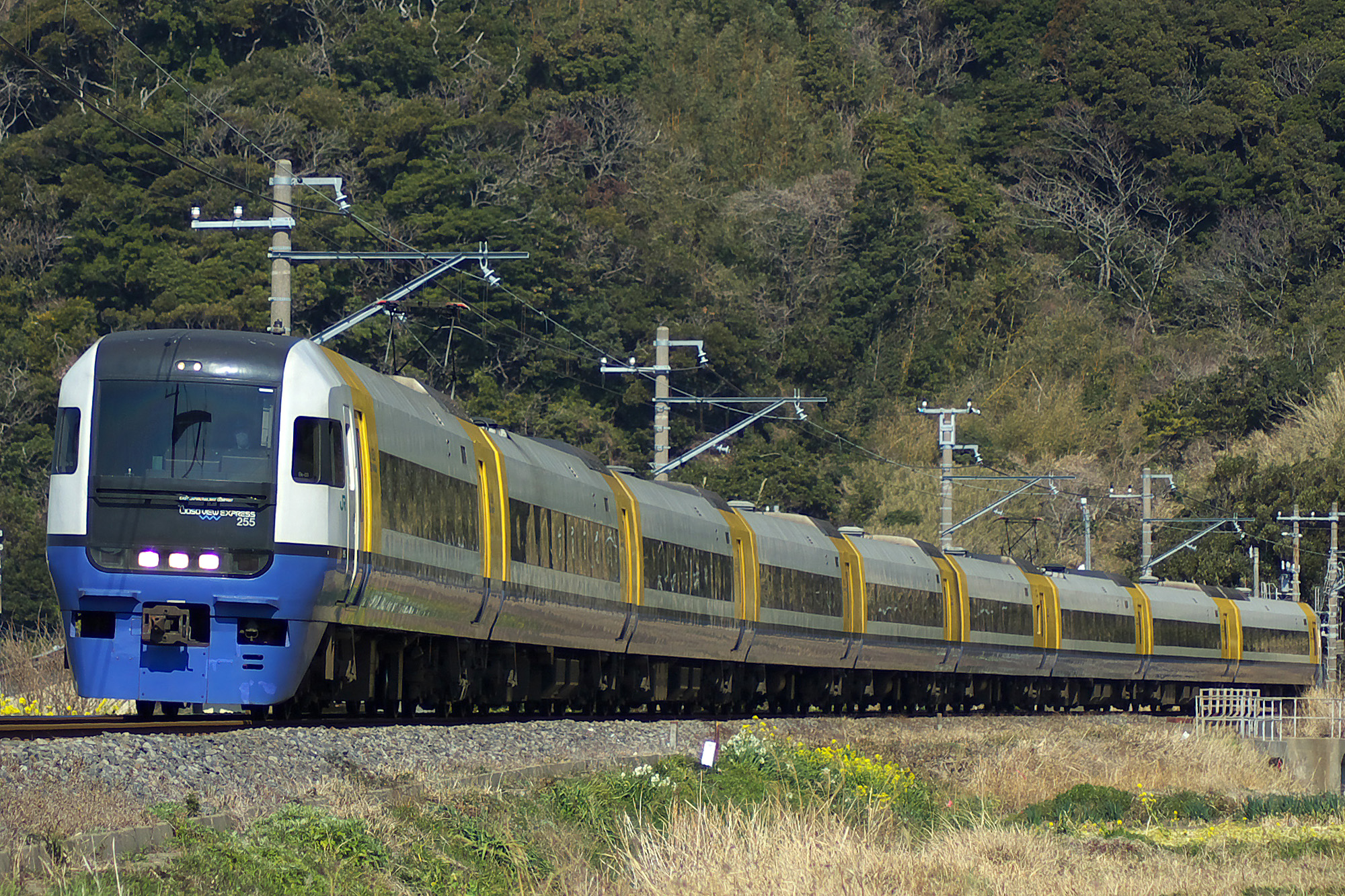
- A 255 series EMU on a Sazanami limited express service

Overview
- Locale: Chiba Prefecture
- Termini: Soga; Awa-Kamogawa
- Stations: 30

Service
- Type: Regional rail
- Operator: JR East
- Depot: Chiba

History
- Opened: March 28, 1912; 114 years ago

Technical
- Line length: 119.4 km (74.2 mi)
- Track gauge: 1,067 mm (3 ft 6 in)
- Operating speed: 110 km/h (70 mph)
Route map

The Uchibō Line (内房線, Uchibō-sen) is a railway line operated by the East Japan Railway Company (JR East) adjacent to Tokyo Bay, paralleling the western (i.e., inner) shore of the Bōsō Peninsula. It connects Soga Station in the city of Chiba to Awa-Kamogawa Station in the city of Kamogawa, passing through the municipalities of Chiba, Ichihara, Sodegaura, Kisarazu, Kimitsu, Futtsu, Kyonan, Tateyama, and Minamibōsō. The line is connected at both ends to the Sotobō Line. The name of the Uchibō Line in the Japanese language is formed from two kanji characters. The first, 内, means "inner" and the second, 房 is the first character of the Bōsō. The name of the line thus refers to its location along the inner part of the Bōsō Peninsula in relation to the Tokyo Metropolitan Area, as opposed to the Sotobō Line, "outer Bōsō" which is on the opposite side of the peninsula. South of Kimitsu is single track, and north of Kimitsu is double track.

== Station list ==
Legend

- ● : All trains stop
- | : All trains pass

Notes

- Local trains stop at every station.
- See Limited Express Sazanami article also.

Line name	Station	Japanese	Distance (km)	to/from Keiyō Line	to/from Sōbu Line (Rapid)	Connecting lines	Location
Line name	Station	Japanese	Distance (km)	Rapid	Rapid	Connecting lines	Location
Sotobō Line	Chiba	千葉	From; Chiba; 0.0		●	Sōbu Line (Rapid) (JO28) (some through services); Chūō-Sōbu Line (JB39); ■ Sōbu Main Line; ■ Narita Line; ■ Sotobō Line; Chiba Urban Monorail Line 1, Line 2; Keisei Chiba Line (Keisei Chiba: KS59)	Chūō-ku, Chiba
Sotobō Line	Hon-Chiba	本千葉	1.4		●	■ Sotobō Line	Chūō-ku, Chiba
Sotobō Line	Soga	蘇我	3.8	●	●	Keiyō Line (some through services); ■ Sotobō Line	Chūō-ku, Chiba
Uchibō Line	Soga	蘇我	From; Soga; 0.0	●	●	Keiyō Line (some through services); ■ Sotobō Line	Chūō-ku, Chiba
Uchibō Line	Hamano	浜野	3.4	●	●		Chūō-ku, Chiba
Uchibō Line	Yawatajuku	八幡宿	5.6	●	●		Ichihara
Uchibō Line	Goi	五井	9.3	●	●	Kominato Railway Kominato Line	Ichihara
Uchibō Line	Anegasaki	姉ケ崎	15.1	●	●		Ichihara
Uchibō Line	Nagaura	長浦	20.5	●	●		Sodegaura
Uchibō Line	Sodegaura	袖ケ浦	24.4	●	●		Sodegaura
Uchibō Line	Iwane	巌根	27.5	●	|		Kisarazu
Uchibō Line	Kisarazu	木更津	31.3	●	●	■ Kururi Line	Kisarazu
Uchibō Line	Kimitsu	君津	38.3	●	●		Kimitsu
Uchibō Line	Aohori	青堀	42.0	●			Futtsu
Uchibō Line	Ōnuki	大貫	46.6	●			Futtsu
Uchibō Line	Sanukimachi	佐貫町	50.7	●			Futtsu
Uchibō Line	Kazusa-Minato	上総湊	55.1	●			Futtsu
Uchibō Line	Takeoka	竹岡	60.2				Futtsu
Uchibō Line	Hamakanaya	浜金谷	64.0				Futtsu
Uchibō Line	Hota	保田	67.5				Kyonan, Awa District
Uchibō Line	Awa-Katsuyama	安房勝山	70.8				Kyonan, Awa District
Uchibō Line	Iwai	岩井	73.7				Minami-Bōsō
Uchibō Line	Tomiura	富浦	79.8				Minami-Bōsō
Uchibō Line	Nako-Funakata	那古船形	82.1				Tateyama
Uchibō Line	Tateyama	館山	85.9				Tateyama
Uchibō Line	Kokonoe	九重	91.7				Tateyama
Uchibō Line	Chikura	千倉	96.6				Minami-Bōsō
Uchibō Line	Chitose	千歳	98.6				Minami-Bōsō
Uchibō Line	Minamihara	南三原	102.2				Minami-Bōsō
Uchibō Line	Wadaura	和田浦	106.8				Minami-Bōsō
Uchibō Line	Emi	江見	111.4				Kamogawa
Uchibō Line	Futomi	太海	116.0				Kamogawa
Uchibō Line	Awa-Kamogawa	安房鴨川	119.4			■ Sotobō Line (some through services)	Kamogawa

Notes:

- Special Rapid services were discontinued from 4 March 2017.
- Commuter Rapid services to/from Keiyo Line were discontinued from 16 March 2024.

== Operation ==
The Uchibō Line operates local service with trains generally originating and terminating at Chiba Station. Trains headed directly for Tokyo Station merge with the Sotobō Line between Soga and Chiba Stations, and with the Sōbu Main Line between Chiba and Tokyo, while express and commuter trains merge with the Keiyō Line from Soga station.

=== Local trains ===
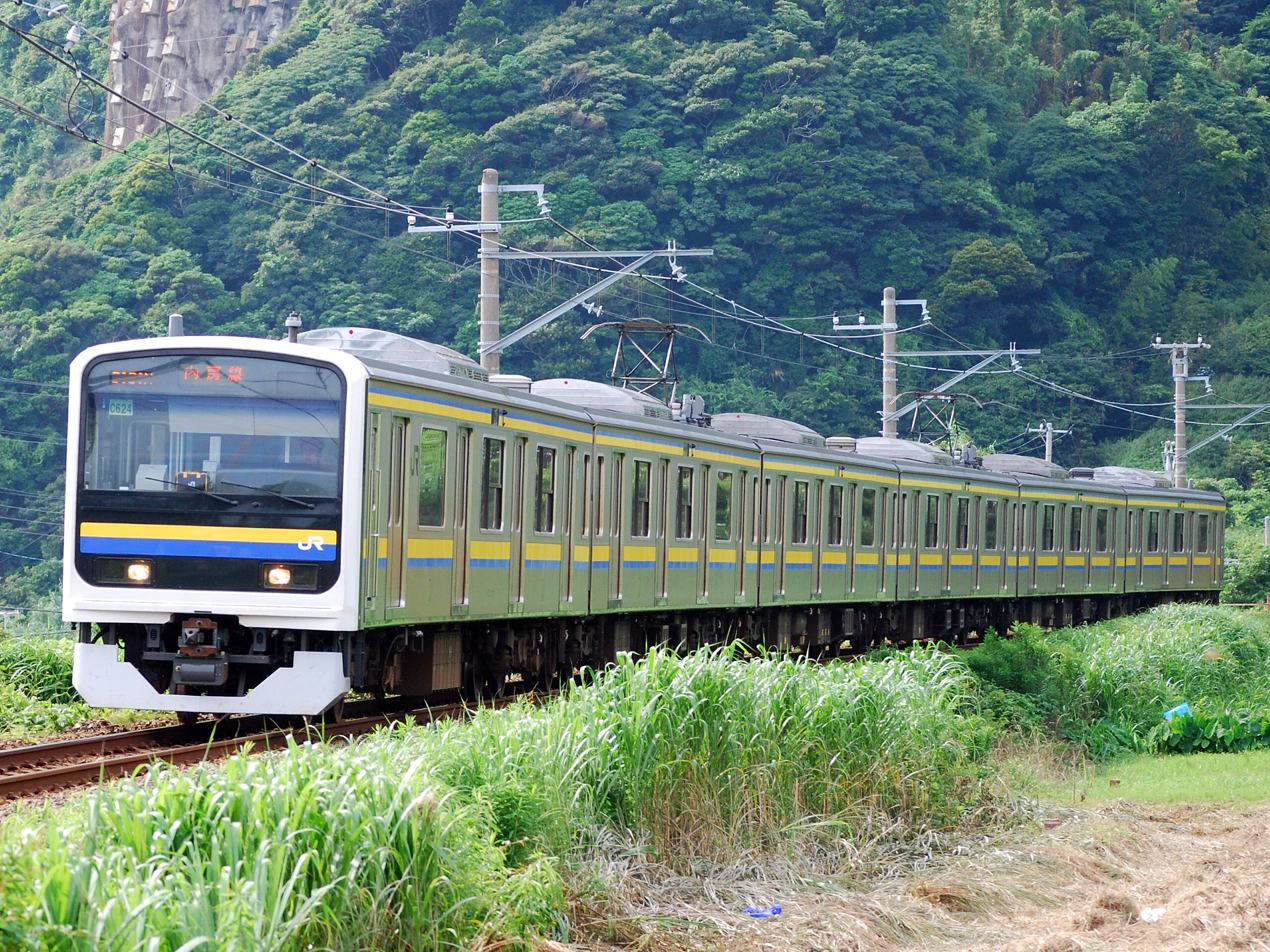
A 209 series EMU on a "Local" service in July 2010

Daytime local service from Chiba to Kisarazu and Kimitsu (sometimes to Kazusa-Minato) is provided by around 2 round trips per hour. In addition, 1 round trip per hour runs from Kisarazu to Awa-Kamogawa (and to Kazusa-Ichinomiya through the Sotobō Line).

=== Keiyō Line through service ===
Keiyō Line Local, Rapid, and Commuter Rapid trains operate through services on the Uchibō Line between Soga and Kimitsu. In the morning, there are three inbound Rapid and Commuter Rapid trains, and in the evening, there are five outbound Rapid and Commuter Rapid trains and two inbound Local trains. On weekends and holidays, Rapid trains replace the Commuter Rapid trains. One of the inbound morning trains originates from Kazusa-Minato.

=== Yokosuka Line—Sōbu Line Rapid through service ===
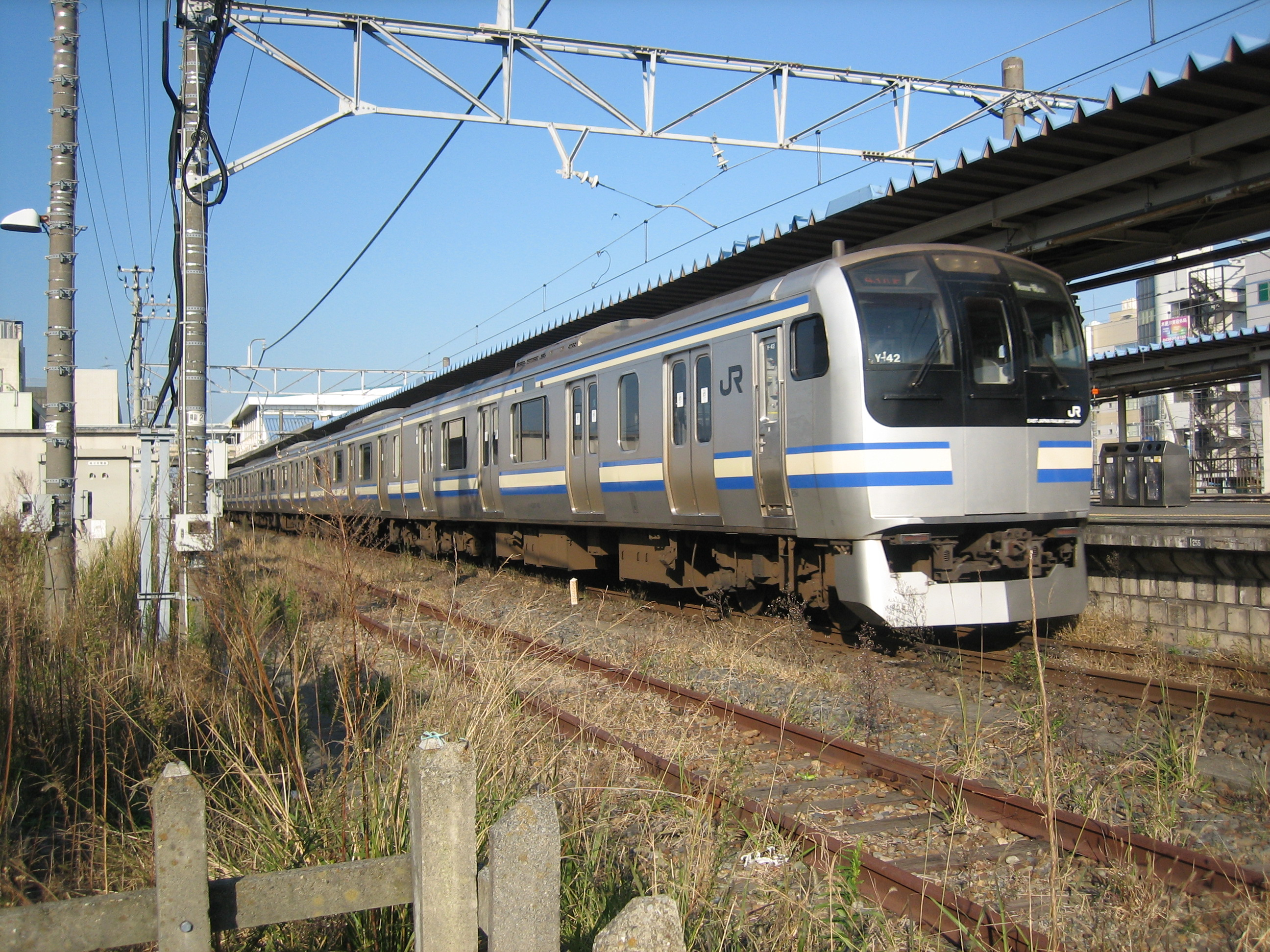
An E217 series EMU on a "Rapid" service in December 2013

Trains leaving north from Kimitsu connect directly to the Sōbu Line (Rapid), with some continuing onto the Yokosuka Line. Since the October 2004 timetable revision, all trains now stop at Nagaura and Sodegaura stations.

=== Limited express trains ===
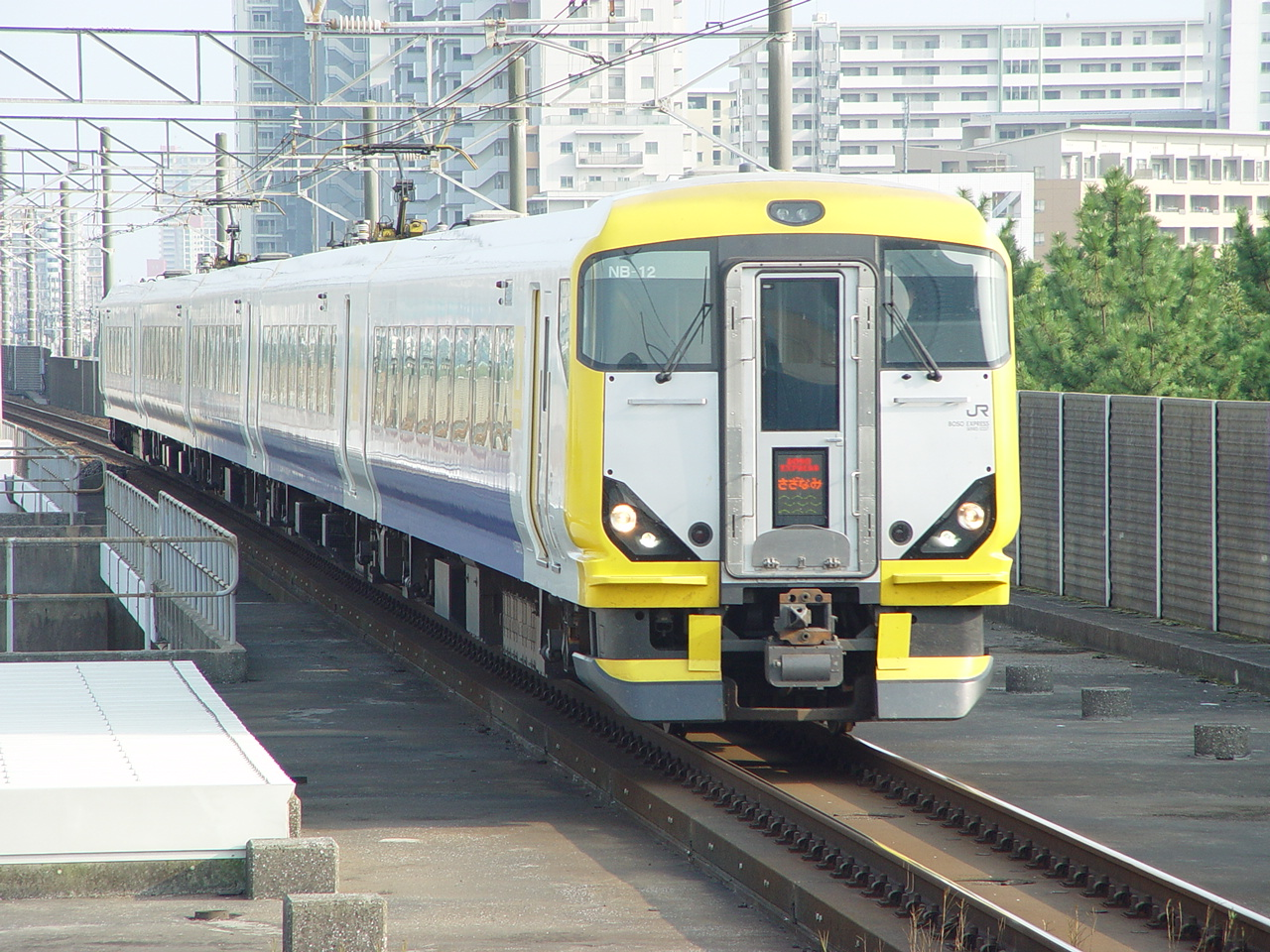
An E257-500 series EMU on a Sazanami service in October 2006

The limited express train Sazanami runs from Tokyo Station to Kimitsu (and Tateyama station during busy periods). The limited express View Sazanami formerly ran on the Uchibō Line as well, but it was merged with the Sazanami following the timetable revision on December 10, 2005. The limited express Shinjuku Sazanami runs from Shinjuku to Tateyama on weekends and during peak seasons.

== Rolling stock ==
Local service

- E131 series 2-car EMUs (since 13 March 2021)
- 209-2000/2100 series 4/6-car EMUs (since 1 October 2009)

Keiyō Line through service

- 209-500 series 10-car EMUs
- E233-5000 series 10-car EMUs

Yokosuka Line—Sōbu Line Rapid through service

- E235-1000 series 11+4-car EMUs with 2 green cars

Sazanami and Shinjuku Sazanami Limited Express

- E257-500 series 5-car EMUs

== History ==
The Uchibō line began operation in 1912, and was originally known as the Kisarazu Line (木更津線). It operated from Soga Station to Anegasaki Station in Ichihara. Several extensions were built over the next few years, and in 1919 it reached Awa-Hōjō (present day Tateyama). At this time it was renamed the Hōjō Line (北条線). By 1925 it had been extended to its present-day terminus, Awa-Kamogawa Station.

In 1929, the Hōjō Line was incorporated into the Bōsō Line. However, in 1933, the original section between Soga and Awa-Kamogawa Stations again became its own line, this time renamed the Bōsō West Line (房総西線), and in 1972 it received its current name.

The Soga - Kimitsu section was duplicated between 1964 and 1971, and the entire line was electrified between 1968 and 1971. Individual section dates as given in the Timeline section below.

=== Timeline ===
- March 28, 1912 – Kisarazu Line (Soga to Anegasaki) begins operation
- August 21, 1912 – Extended from Anegasaki to Kisarazu
- January 15, 1915 – Extended from Kisarazu to Kazusa-Minato
- October 11, 1916 – Extended from Kazusa-Minato to Hamakanaya
- August 1, 1917 – Extended from Hamakanaya to Awa-Katsuyama
- August 10, 1918 – Extended from Awa-Katsuyama to Nako-Funakata
- May 24, 1919 – Extended from Nako-Funakata to Awa-Hōjō; renamed Hōjō Line
- June 1, 1921 – Extended from Awa-Hōjō to Minamihara
- December 20, 1922 – Extended from Minamihara to Emi
- July 25, 1924 – Extended from Emi to Futomi
- July 11, 1925 – Extended from Futomi to Awa-Kamogawa
- June 16, 1926 – Takeoka station opened
- May 20, 1927 – Chitose railyard opened
- August 15, 1929 – Bōsō line extended to Awa-Kamogawa; Hōjō Line incorporated into Bōsō Line
- August 1, 1930 – Chitose railyard is upgraded to a station
- April 1, 1933 – Bōsō line from Soga to Awa-Kamogawa (the run of the former Hōjō Line) is renamed Bōsō West Line
- November 20, 1941 – Iwane station opened
- March 1, 1946 – Awa-Hōjō station renamed Tateyama Station
- January 10, 1947 – Nagaura station opened
- April 10, 1956 – Shūsai station renamed Kimitsu Station
- July 1, 1964 – Double-track section built between Soga and Hamano
- September 20, 1964 – Double track extended from Hamano to Yawatajuku
- July 4, 1965 – Double track extended from Yawatajuku to Goi
- May 26, 1968 – Double track extended from Goi to Nagaura
- July 13, 1968 – Electric wires extended from Chiba station, past Sogo, extending to Kisarazu
- March 20, 1969 – Double track extended from Nagaura to Naraba
- July 10, 1969 – 135 C57-105 steam engines removed from service
- July 11, 1969 – Electric wires extended from Kisarazu to Chikura
- March 18, 1970 – Double track extended from Naraba to Kisarazu
- March 24, 1970 – Double track extended from Kisarazu to Kimitsu
- July 1, 1971 – Electric wires extended from Chikura to Awa-Kamogawa
- July 15, 1972 – Renamed Uchibō Line
- March 31, 1974 – Naraba station renamed Sodegaura
- November 15, 1982 – Freight service between Kisarazu and Awa-Kamogawa discontinued
- April 1, 1987 – Acquired by East Japan Railway Company following the division and privatization of JNR initiated by prime minister Yasuhiro Nakasone; Japan Freight Railway Company becomes a second class railway enterprise between Soga and Kisarazu
- November 1, 1996 – Japan Freight Railway Company second class enterprise between Soga and Kisarazu is discontinued
- February 4, 2001 – ATS-P usage implemented between Chiba and Iwane
- October 1, 2009 - 209-2000/2100 series EMUs are introduced on local services
- March 13, 2021 - E131 series EMUs are introduced on local services between Kisarazu and Awa-Kamogawa, replacing most 209-2000/2100 series trains in that section
