= Dia Kensetsu =

Japanese condominium builder

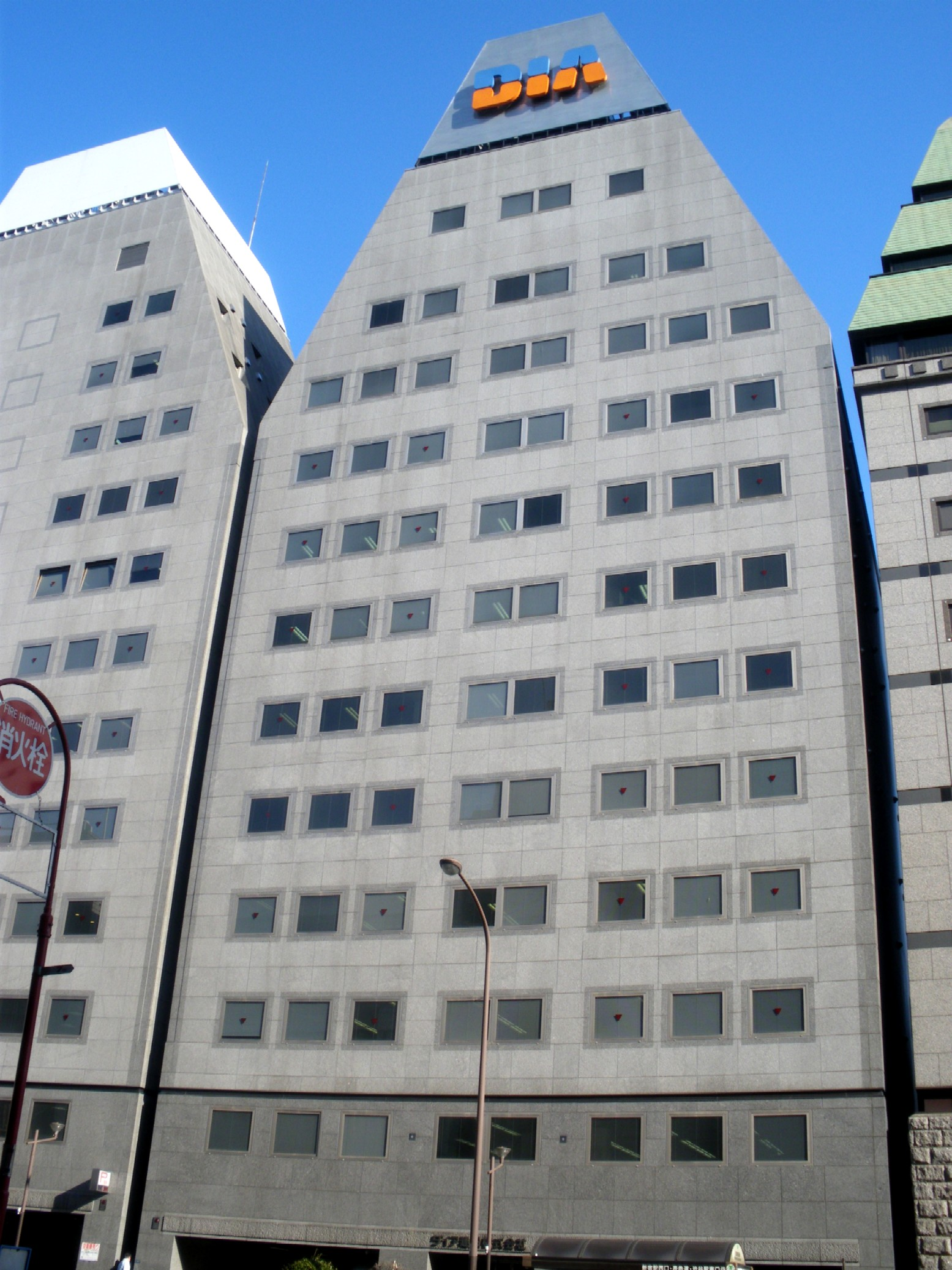
Dia Kensetsu headquarters in Shinjuku, Tokyo

Dia Kensetsu Co., Ltd. (ダイア建設) is a Japanese condominium builder. There are about 2000 condominiums under the Dia Palace brand. The company filed for bankruptcy protection in December 2008.
