= Kisarazu Station =

Railway station in Kisarazu, Chiba Prefecture, Japan

Kisarazu Station 木更津駅
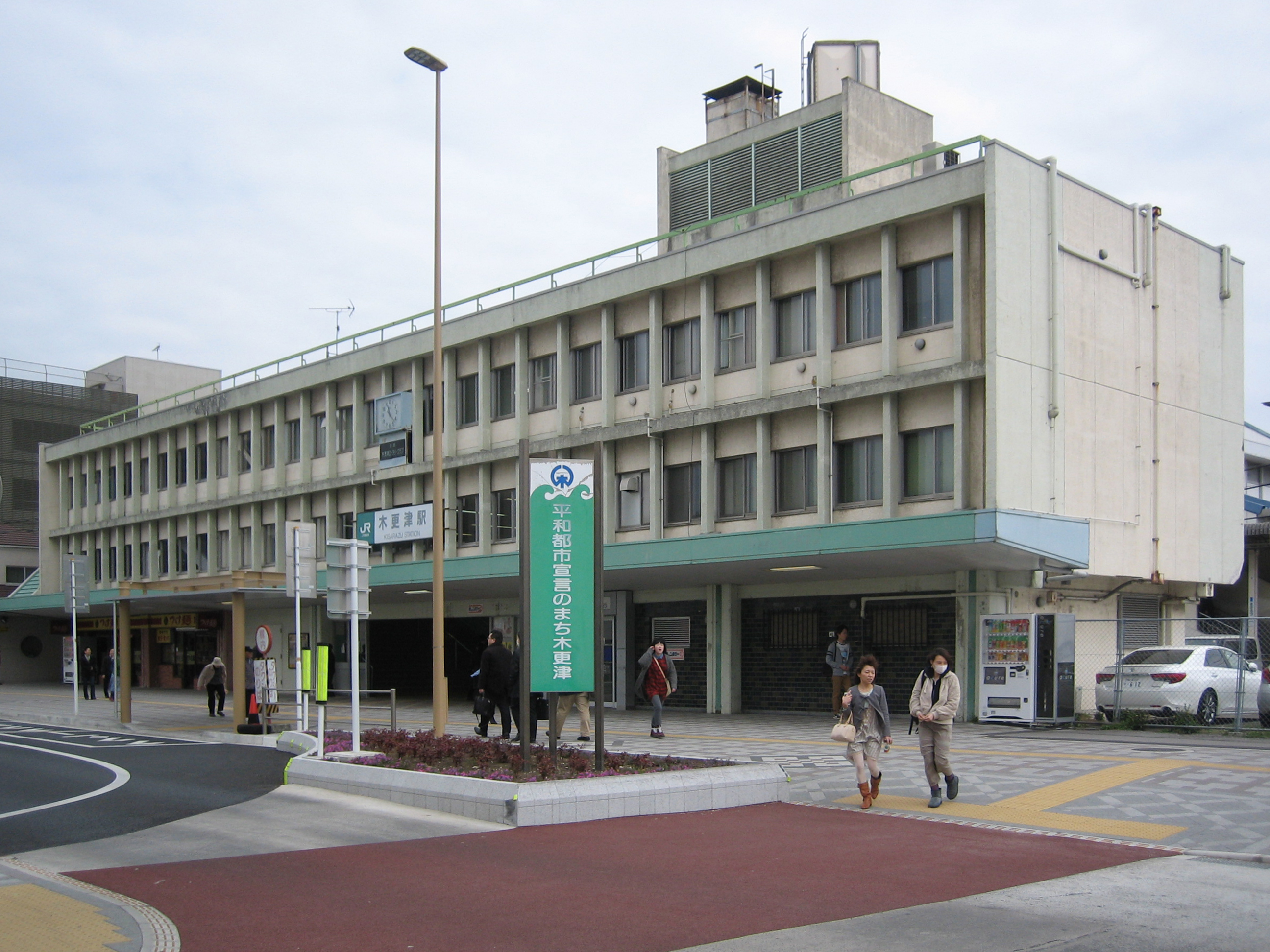
- West side of Kisarazu Station, March 2014

General information
- Location: 1 Fujimi, Kisarazu-shi, Chiba-ken 292-0831; Japan
- Coordinates: 35°22′53.9″N 139°55′34.43″E
- Operator: JR East
- Lines: ■ Uchibō Line; ■ Kururi Line
- Connections: Bus stop

Other information
- Status: Staffed ("Midori no Madoguchi")
- Website: Official website

History
- Opened: August 21, 1912

Passengers
- FY2019: 13,529 daily

Services
Preceding station	JR East	Following station
Anegasaki (limited service) towards Tokyo	Sazanami	Kimitsu Terminus
Iwane towards Chiba	Uchibō Line Keiyō Rapid	Kimitsu towards Kazusa-Minato
Sodegaura towards Soga	Uchibō Line Sobū Rapid	Kimitsu Terminus
Iwane towards Soga or Chiba	Uchibō Line Local	Kimitsu towards Awa-Kamogawa
Terminus	Kururi Line	Gion towards Kazusa-Kameyama
Location
- Location within Chiba Prefecture Location within Japan

Kisarazu Station (木更津駅, Kisarazu-eki) is a junction passenger railway station in the city of Kisarazu, Chiba Prefecture, Japan, operated by the East Japan Railway Company (JR East).

== Lines ==
Kisarazu Station is served by the Uchibō Line and Kururi Line. It is 31.3 kilometers from the starting point of the Uchibō Line at Soga Station and forms the eastern terminus of the 32.3 kilometer Kururi Line.

== Station layout ==
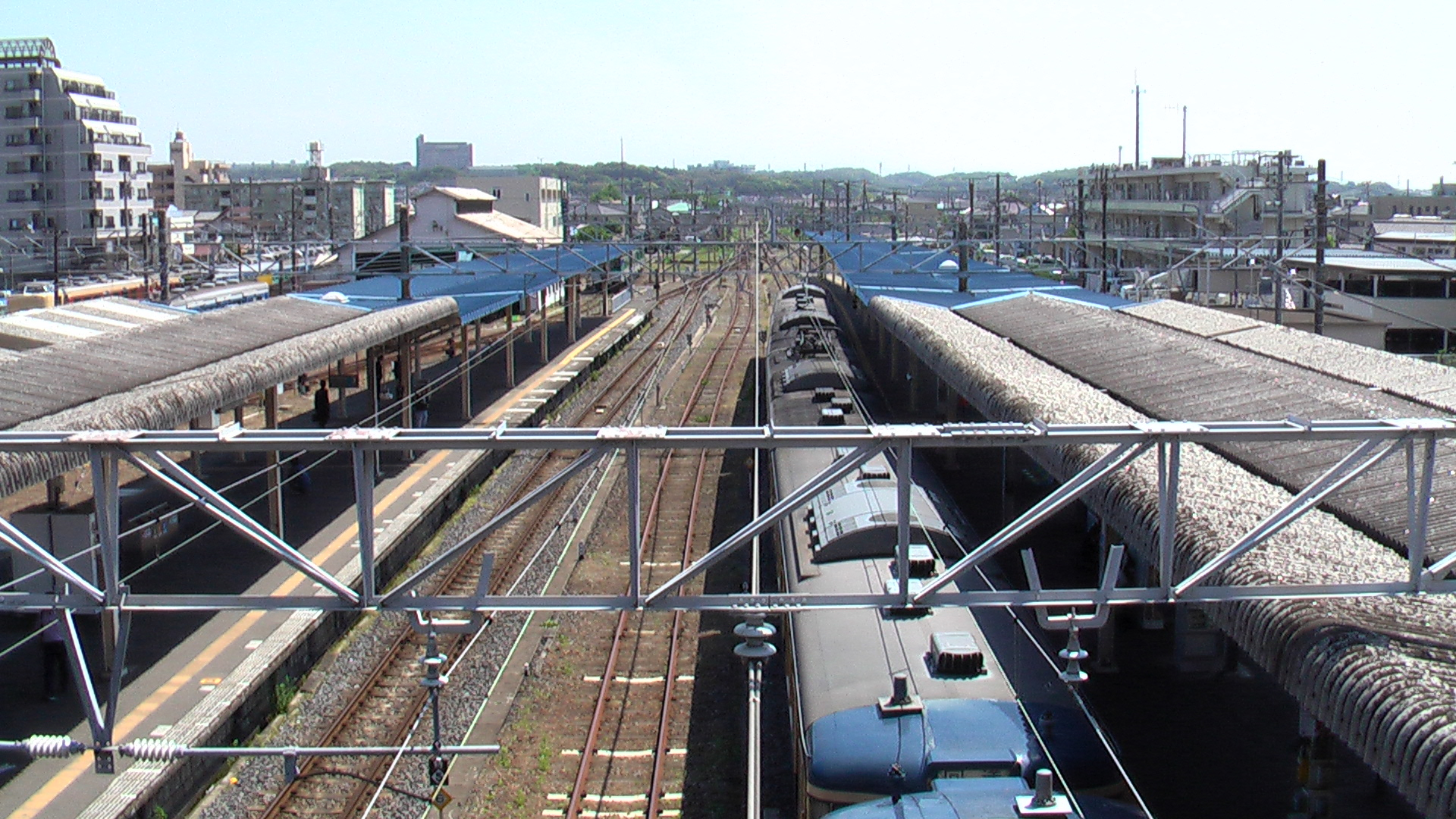
View of train track layout

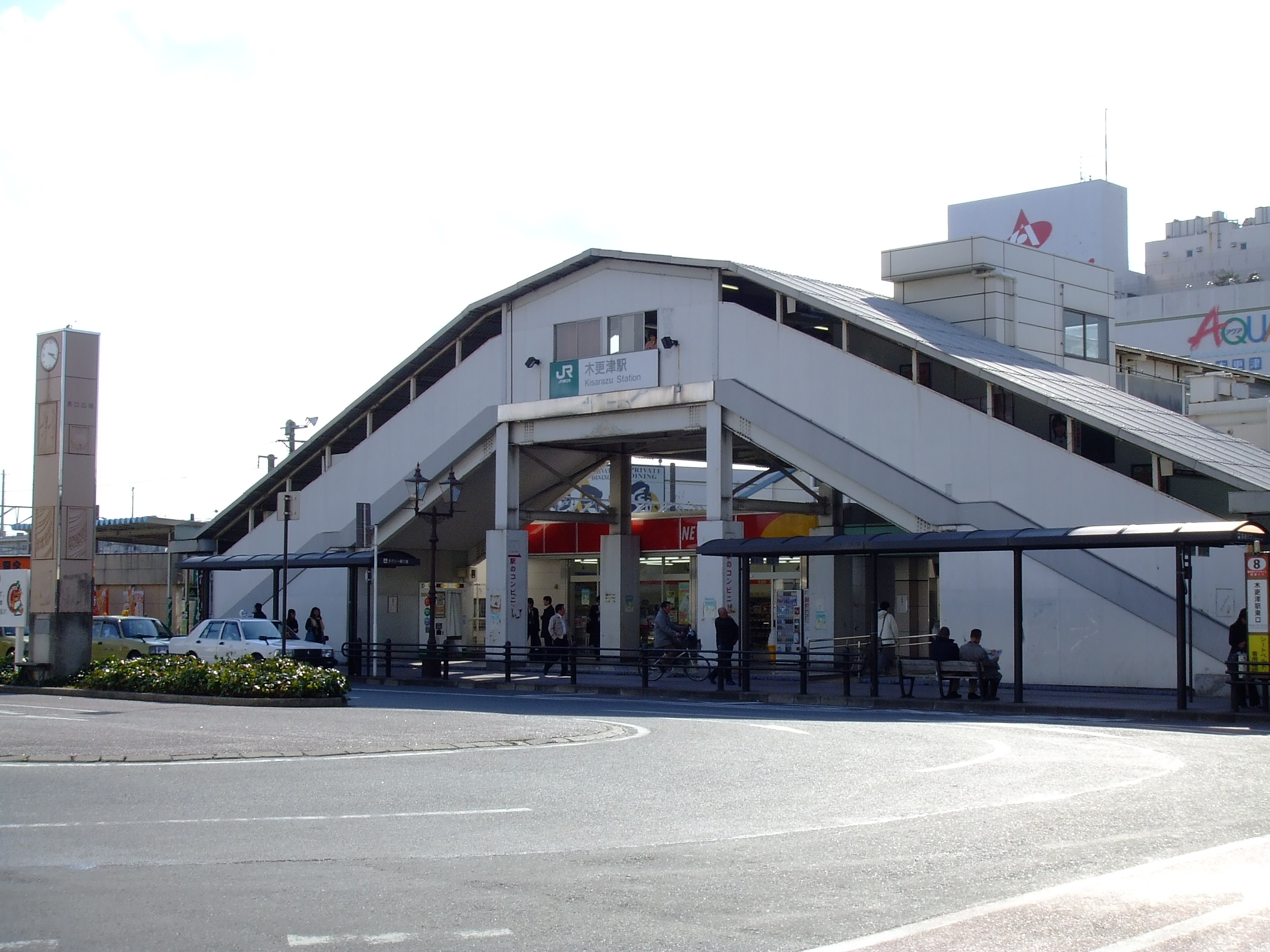
East side, March 2009

The station consists of two island platforms serving four tracks, connected to the station building by a footbridge. The station has a "Midori no Madoguchi" staffed ticket office.

=== Platforms ===
1	■ Uchibō Line	for Goi and Chiba
2	■ Uchibō Line	for bi-directional traffic
3	■ Uchibō Line	for Kimitsu, Tateyama, and Awa-Kamogawa
4	■ Kururi Line	for Kururi and Kazusa-Kameyama

== History ==
Suburban trains at station (2019)

Kisarazu Station opened on August 21, 1912. The station was absorbed into the JR East network upon the privatization of JNR on April 1, 1987.

== Bus terminals ==
=== Highway buses ===
- For Narita International Airport
- For Haneda Airport
- For Tokyo Station
- For Shinjuku Station
- For Shinagawa Station
- For Kawasaki Station
- For Yokohama Station

== Passenger statistics ==
In fiscal 2019, the station was used by an average of 13,529 passengers daily (boarding passengers only).

== Surrounding area ==
- National Route 16
- Kisarazu City Hall
- Port of Kisarazu

== See also ==
- List of railway stations in Japan
