= Goi Station =

Railway station in Ichihara, Chiba Prefecture, Japan

Goi Station 五井駅
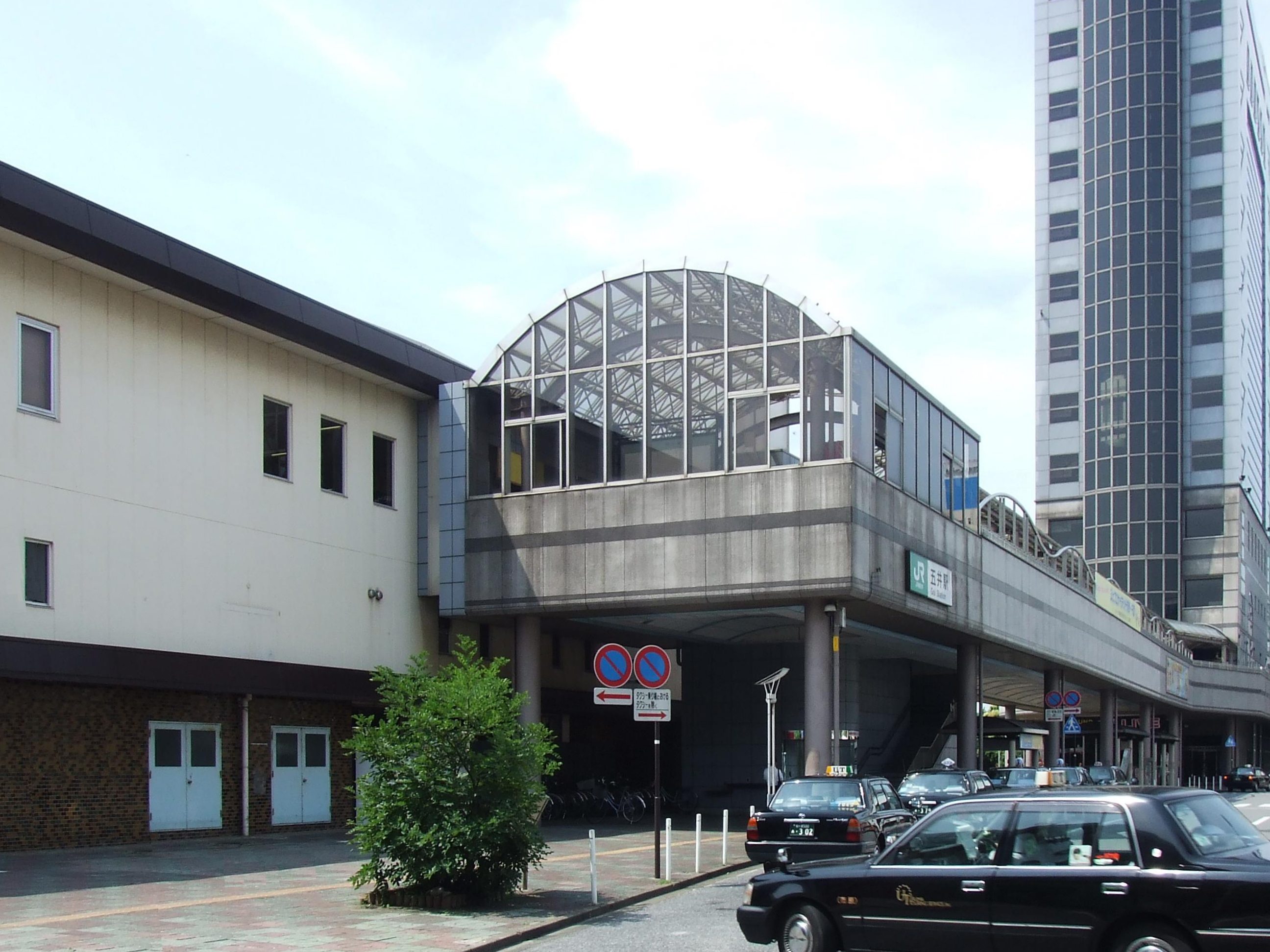
- The west side of Goi Station in July 2008

General information
- Location: Goi-Chūō-Nishi, Ichihara-shi, Chiba-ken; Japan
- Coordinates: 35.5129°N 140.0895°E
- Operator: JR East, Kominato Railway
- Lines: ■ Uchibo Line; ■ Kominato Line
- Platforms: 2 island platforms
- Tracks: 4

History
- Opened: 28 March 1912

Services
Preceding station	JR East	Following station
Soga towards Tokyo	Sazanami	Anegasaki (limited service) towards Kimitsu
Yawatajuku towards Soga	Uchibō Line Keiyō Rapid	Anegasaki towards Kazusa-Minato
Yawatajuku towards Chiba	Uchibō Line Sobū Rapid	Anegasaki towards Kimitsu
Yawatajuku towards Soga or Chiba	Uchibō Line Local	Anegasaki towards Awa-Kamogawa
Preceding station	Kominato Railway	Following station
Terminus	Kominato Line	Kazusa-Murakami towards Kazusa-Nakano
Location
- Location within Chiba Prefecture Location within Japan

Goi station (五井駅, Goi-eki) is a railway station in Ichihara, Chiba, Japan, operated by the East Japan Railway Company (JR East) and the private railway operator Kominato Railway.

== Lines ==
Goi station is served by the Uchibo Line and the Kominato Line.

== Station layout ==
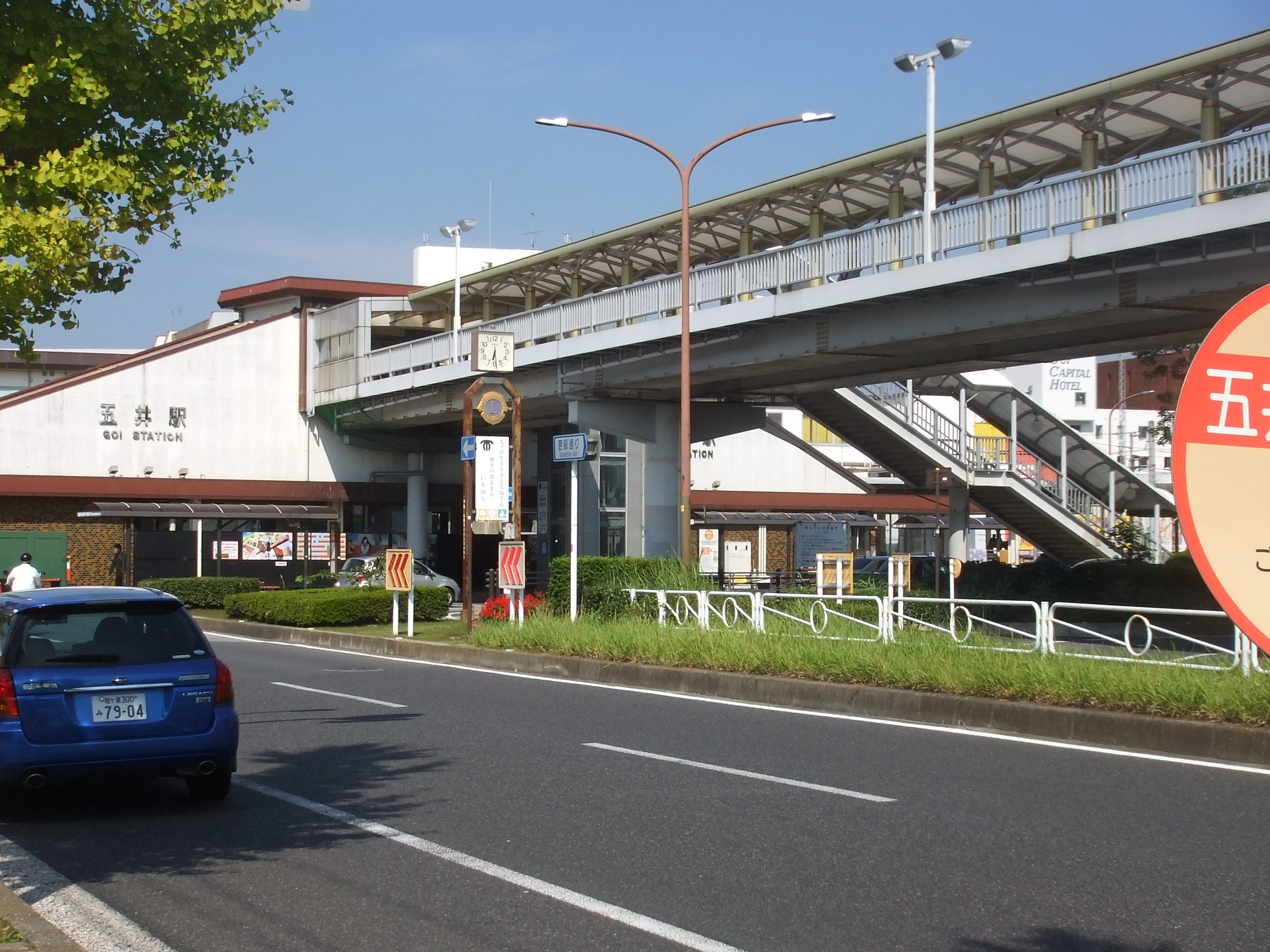
The east side of the station in October 2017

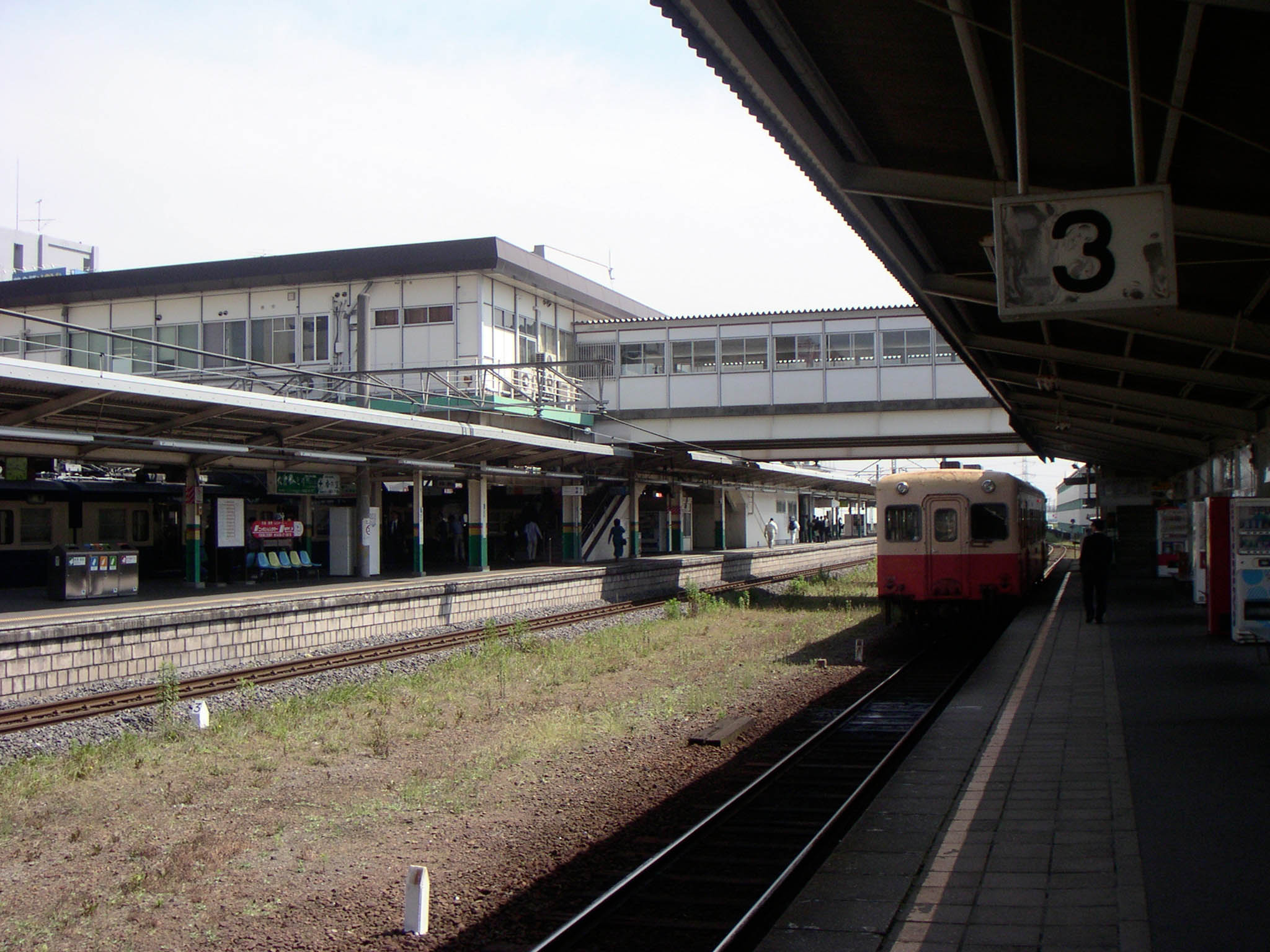
View from Kominato Line platform in May 2005

The station has a different address for each company. The address for JR East is 2-1-11 Goi-Chūō-Nishi, Ichihara, Chiba, and the address for the Kominato Railway is 1-1-2 Goi-Chūō-Higashi, Ichihara, Chiba. The station has four tracks with two island platforms, one for the Uchibō line and another for the Kominato line.

=== Platforms ===
1	■ Uchibo Line	for Chiba and Tokyo
2	■ Uchibo Line	for Kisarazu and Tateyama
3/4	■ Kominato Line	for Kazusa-Ushiku, Yōrōkeikoku, and Kazusa-Nakano

== History ==
The JNR station opened on March 28, 1912. The Kominato Railway station opened on March 7, 1925.

== Passenger statistics ==
In fiscal 2005, the JR East station was used by an average of 20,307 passengers daily (boarding passengers only), and the Kominato Railway station was used by 1,810 passengers daily.

== Surrounding area ==
- Ichihara City Hall Goi Branch
- Sunplaza Ichihara
- Ichihara Seaside Stadium
- Goi Train Facility
- Chiba Prefectural Keiyō High School
- Tōkai University Bōyō High School
- Kantō Anzen Eisei Gijutsu Center
- Ichihara Sea Fishing Facility

== See also ==
- List of railway stations in Japan
