= Amaariki Station =

Railway station in Ichihara, Chiba Prefecture, Japan

Amaariki Station 海士有木駅
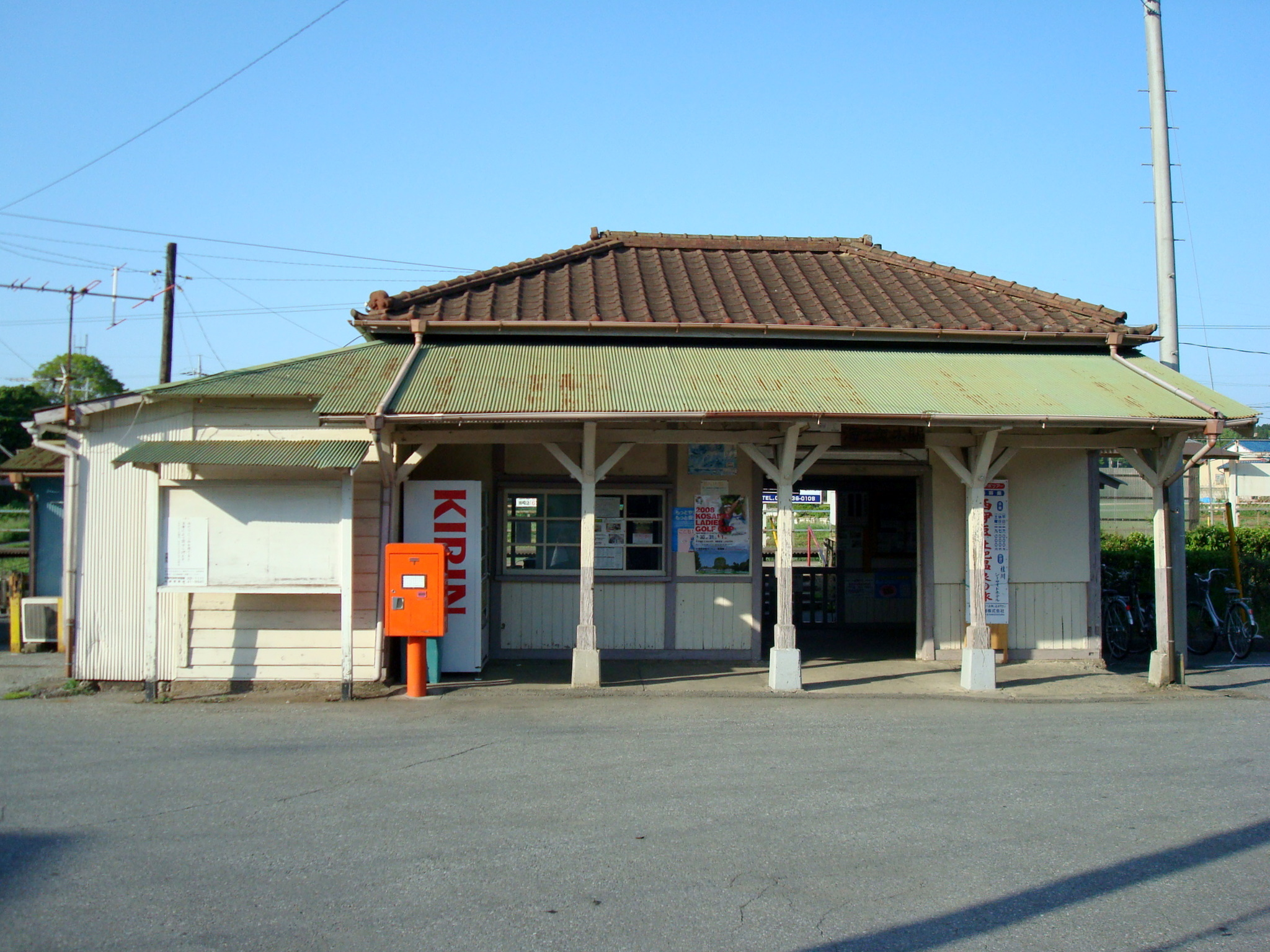
- Amaariki Station in March 2017

General information
- Location: Amaariki, Ichihara-shi, Chiba-ken 290-0207; Japan
- Coordinates: 35°28′54.06″N 140°07′26.63″E
- Operator: Kominato Railway
- Line: ■ Kominato Line
- Distance: 5.4 km from Goi
- Platforms: 2 side platforms
- Tracks: 2

Other information
- Website: Official website

History
- Opened: 7 March 1925

Passengers
- FY2010: 215 daily

Services
Preceding station	Kominato Railway	Following station
Kazusa-Murakami towards Goi	Kominato Line	Kazusa-Mitsumata towards Kazusa-Nakano
Location
- Location within Chiba Prefecture

Amaariki Station (海士有木駅, Amaariki-eki) is a railway station on the Kominato Line in Ichihara, Chiba Prefecture, Japan, operated by the Kominato Railway.

== Lines ==
Amaariki Station is served by the 39.1 km Kominato Line, and lies 5.4 km from the western terminus of the line at Goi Station.

== Station layout ==
Amaariki Station has two opposed side platforms serving two tracks. The station building, which dates from 1925, is staffed.

=== Platforms ===
1	■ Kominato Line	for Goi
2	■ Kominato Line	for Kazusa-Ushiku and Kazusa-Nakano

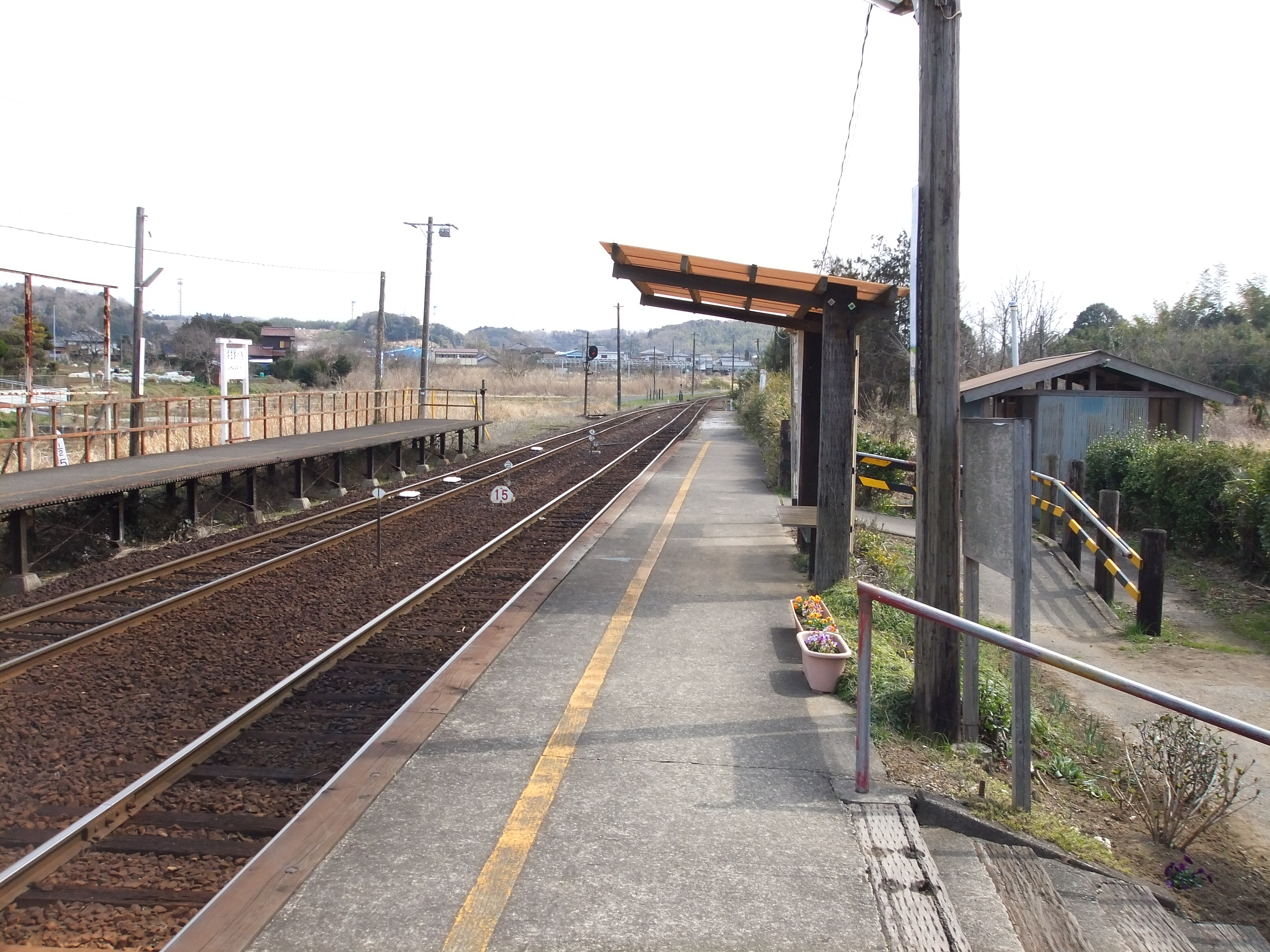
The platforms in March 2017

== History ==
Amaariki Station opened on March 7, 1925.

== Passenger statistics ==
In fiscal 2010, the station was used by an average of 215 passengers daily (boarding passengers only).

== Bus routes ==
Bus stop name	No	Paramount bus stops	Destination	Operators	Note
Ama-ariki Eki iriguchi	八26	Ichihara City Hall	Yawatajuku Station	Kominato Railway	Suspension on holidays
Ama-ariki Eki iriguchi			Ama-ariki	Kominato Railway	Suspension on holidays

== See also ==
- List of railway stations in Japan
