= Kazusa-Kubo Station =

Railway station in Ichihara, Chiba prefecture, Japan

Coordinates: 35°22′2.92″N 140°09′16.59″E

Kazusa-Kubo Station 上総久保駅
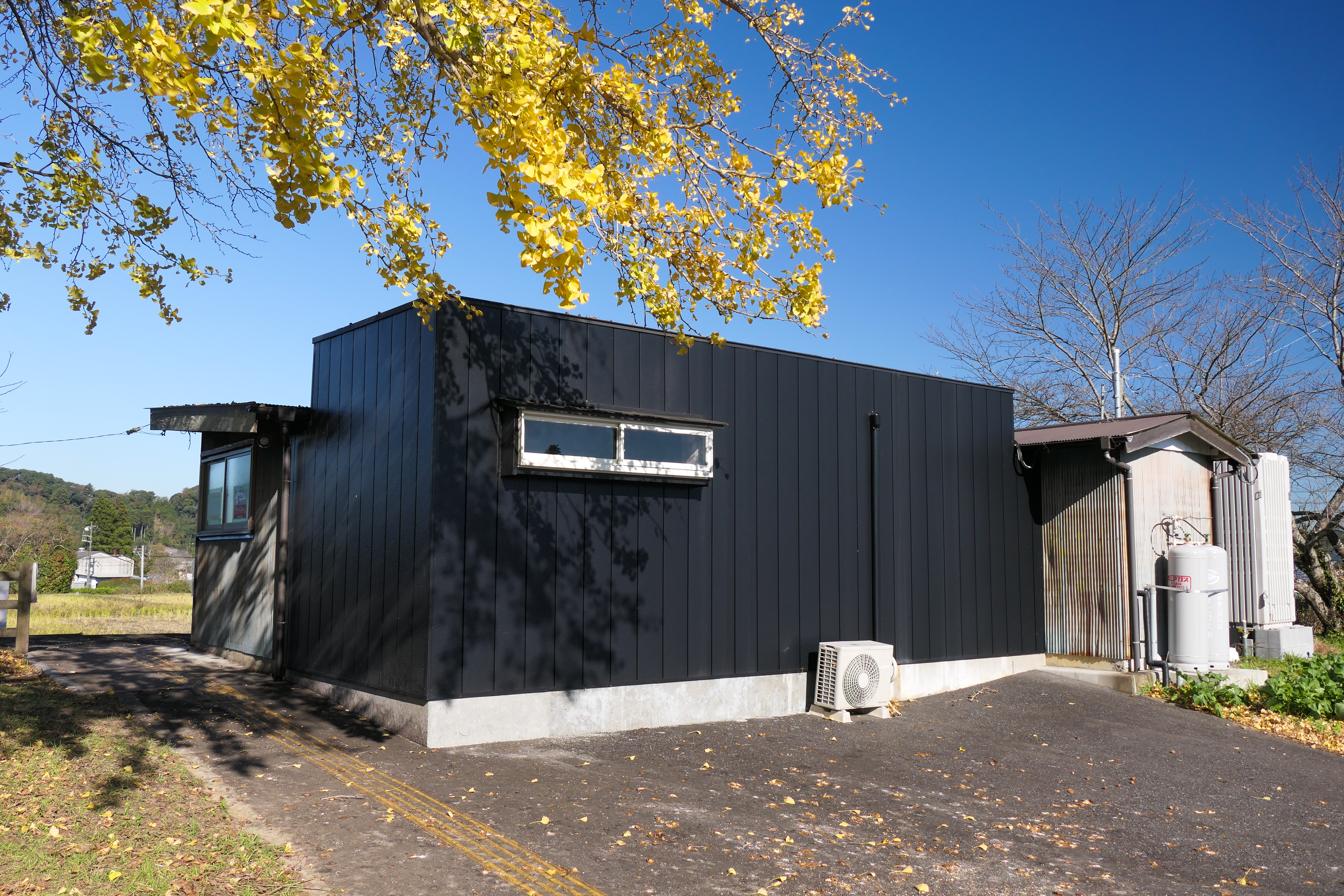
- Entrance of Kazusa-Kubo Station in November 2021

General information
- Location: Kubo 573-4, Ichihara, Chiba （千葉県市原市久保573-4） Japan
- Operator: Kominato Railroad Company
- Line: Kominato Line

History
- Opened: 1933

Passengers
- 2008: 10 daily

Services
Preceding station	Kominato Railway	Following station
Kazusa-Tsurumai towards Goi	Kominato Line	Takataki towards Kazusa-Nakano
Location

Kazusa-Kubo Station (上総久保駅, Kazusa-Kubo-eki) is a railway station operated by the Kominato Railway Company's Kominato Line, located in Ichihara, Chiba Prefecture, Japan. It is 22.0 kilometers from the western terminus of the Kominato Line at Goi Station.

== History ==
Kazusa-Kubo Station was opened on April 10, 1933. It has been unattended since 1956.

== Lines ==
- Kominato Railway Company
  - Kominato Line

== Station layout ==
Kazusa-Kubo Station has a single side platform serving bidirectional traffic. There is a small rain shelter built on the platform, but no station building.

=== Platforms ===
1	■ Kominato Line	Kazusa-Ushiku, Goi; Kazusa-Nakano
