= Satomi Station =

Railway station in Ichihara, Chiba Prefecture, Japan

Coordinates: 35°20′12.21″N 140°08′43.87″E

Satomi Station 里見駅
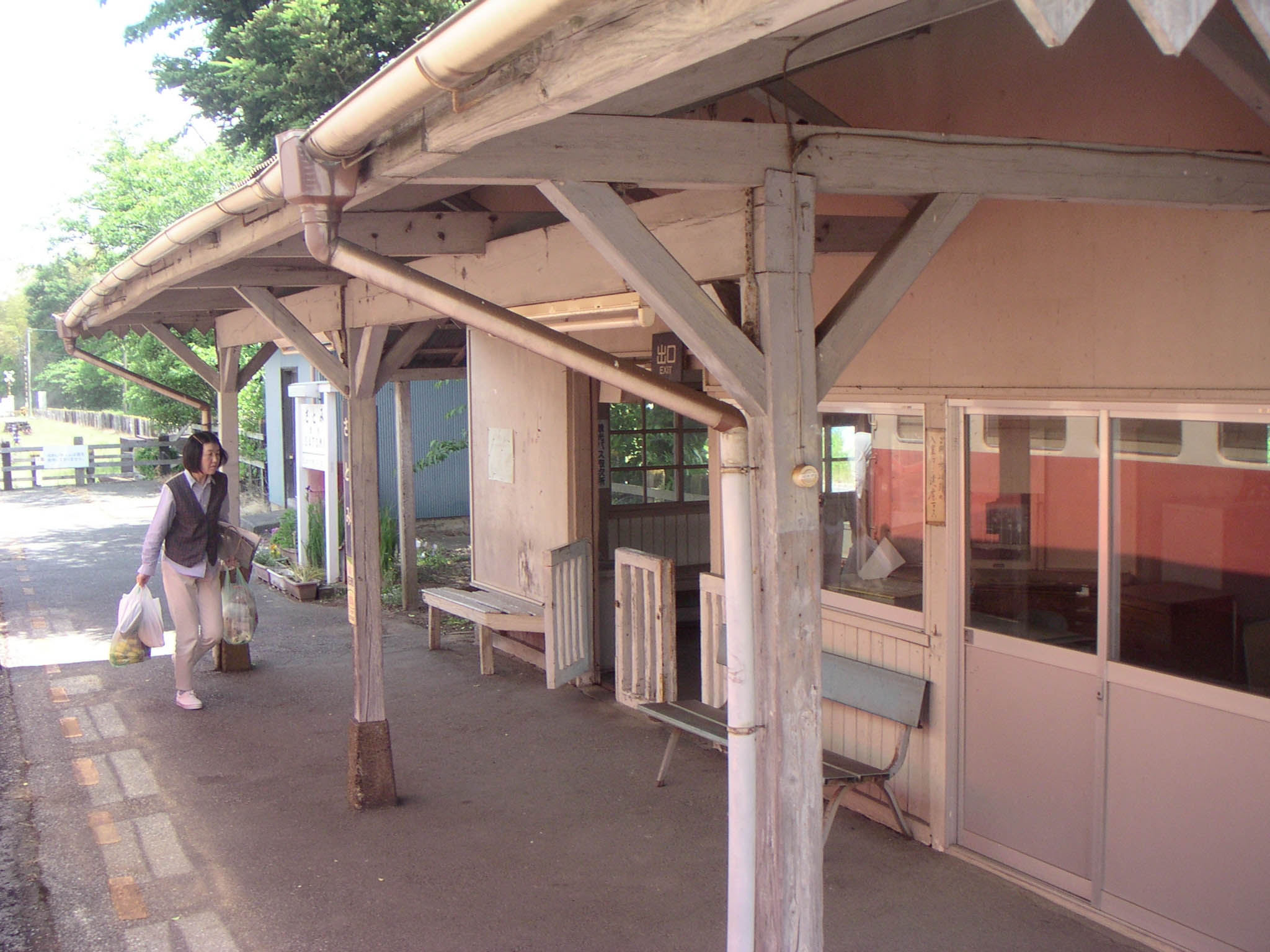

General information
- Location: Hirano 176-1, Ichihara, Chiba （千葉県市原市平野176-1） Japan
- Operator: Kominato Railroad Company
- Line: Kominato Line

History
- Opened: 1925

Passengers
- 2008: 22 daily

Services
Preceding station	Kominato Railway	Following station
Takataki towards Goi	Kominato Line	Itabu towards Kazusa-Nakano
Location

Satomi Station (里見駅, Satomi-eki) is a railway station operated by the Kominato Railway Company's Kominato Line, located in Ichihara, Chiba Prefecture, Japan. It is 25.7 kilometers from the western terminus of the Kominato Line at Goi Station.

== History ==
Satomi Station was opened on March 7, 1925. Use of its island platform was discontinued on September 16, 1998. It has been unattended since 2002.

== Lines ==
- Kominato Railway Company
  - Kominato Line

== Station layout ==
Satomi Station has a single side platform serving bidirectional traffic. There is a small station building with a waiting room and a ticket office, which is not open.

=== Platforms ===
1	■ Kominato Line	Kazusa-Ushiku, Goi; Kazusa-Nakano
