= Takataki Station =

Railway station in Ichihara, Chiba Prefecture, Japan

Coordinates: 35°21′11.78″N 140°09′1.44″E

Takataki Station 高滝駅
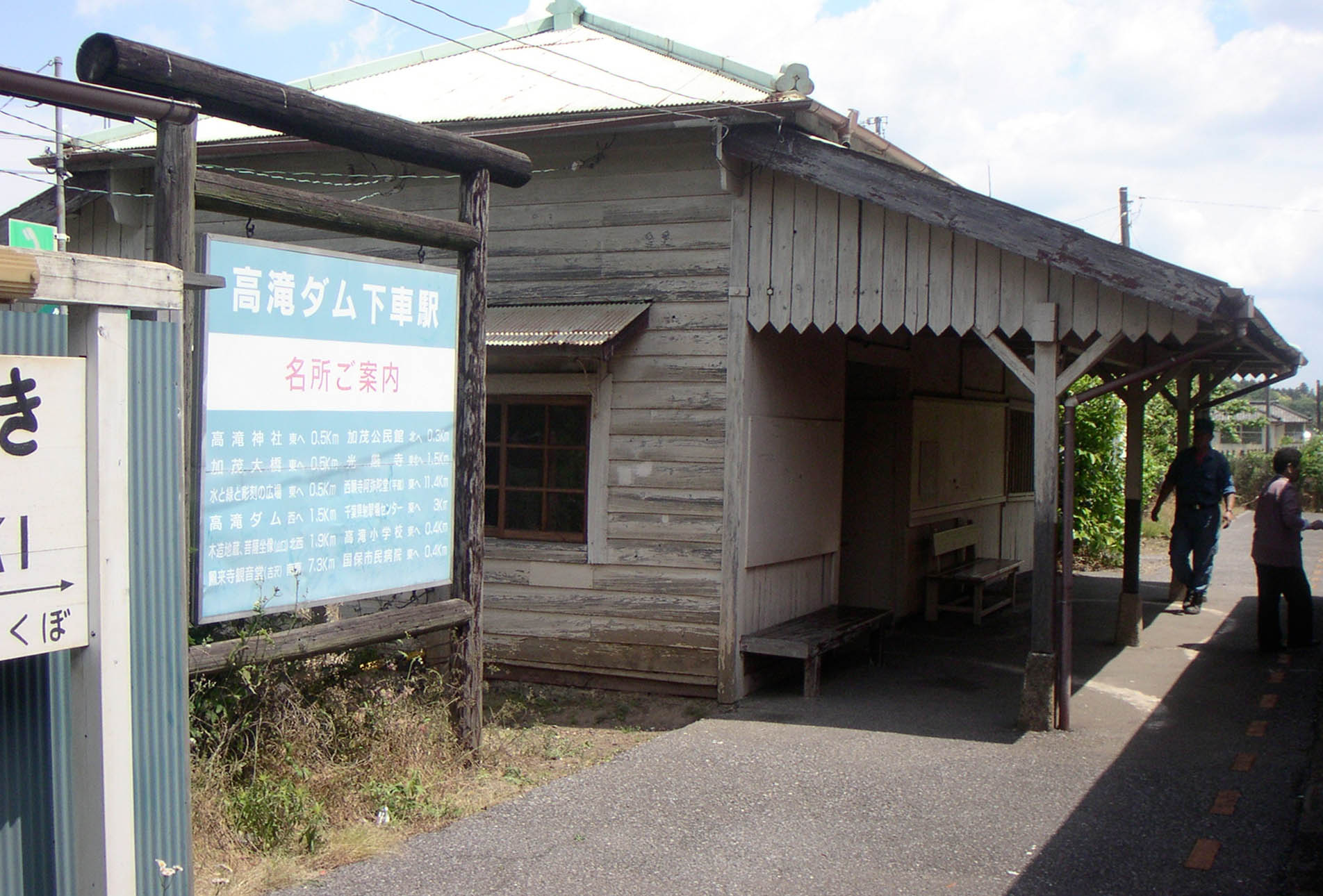

General information
- Location: Takataki 737, Ichihara, Chiba （千葉県市原市高滝737-） Japan
- Operator: Kominato Railroad Company
- Line: Kominato Line

History
- Opened: 1925

Passengers
- 2008: 37 daily

Services
Preceding station	Kominato Railway	Following station
Kazusa-Kubo towards Goi	Kominato Line	Satomi towards Kazusa-Nakano
Location

Takataki Station (高滝駅, Takataki-eki) is a railway station operated by the Kominato Railway Company's Kominato Line, located in Ichihara, Chiba Prefecture, Japan. It is 23.8 kilometers from the western terminus of the Kominato Line at Goi Station.

== History ==
Takataki Station was opened on March 7, 1925. Use of its island platform was discontinued on September 16, 1998. It has been unattended since 1967.

== Lines ==
- Kominato Railway Company
  - Kominato Line

== Station layout ==
Takataki Station has a single side platform serving bidirectional traffic. The overgrown ruins of an opposing side platform remain. There is a small station building with a waiting room, but with no ticket gate.

=== Platforms ===
1	■ Kominato Line	Kazusa-Ushiku, Goi; Kazusa-Nakano
