= Kazusa-Murakami Station =

Railway station in Ichihara, Chiba Prefecture, Japan

Kazusa-Murakami Station 上総村上駅
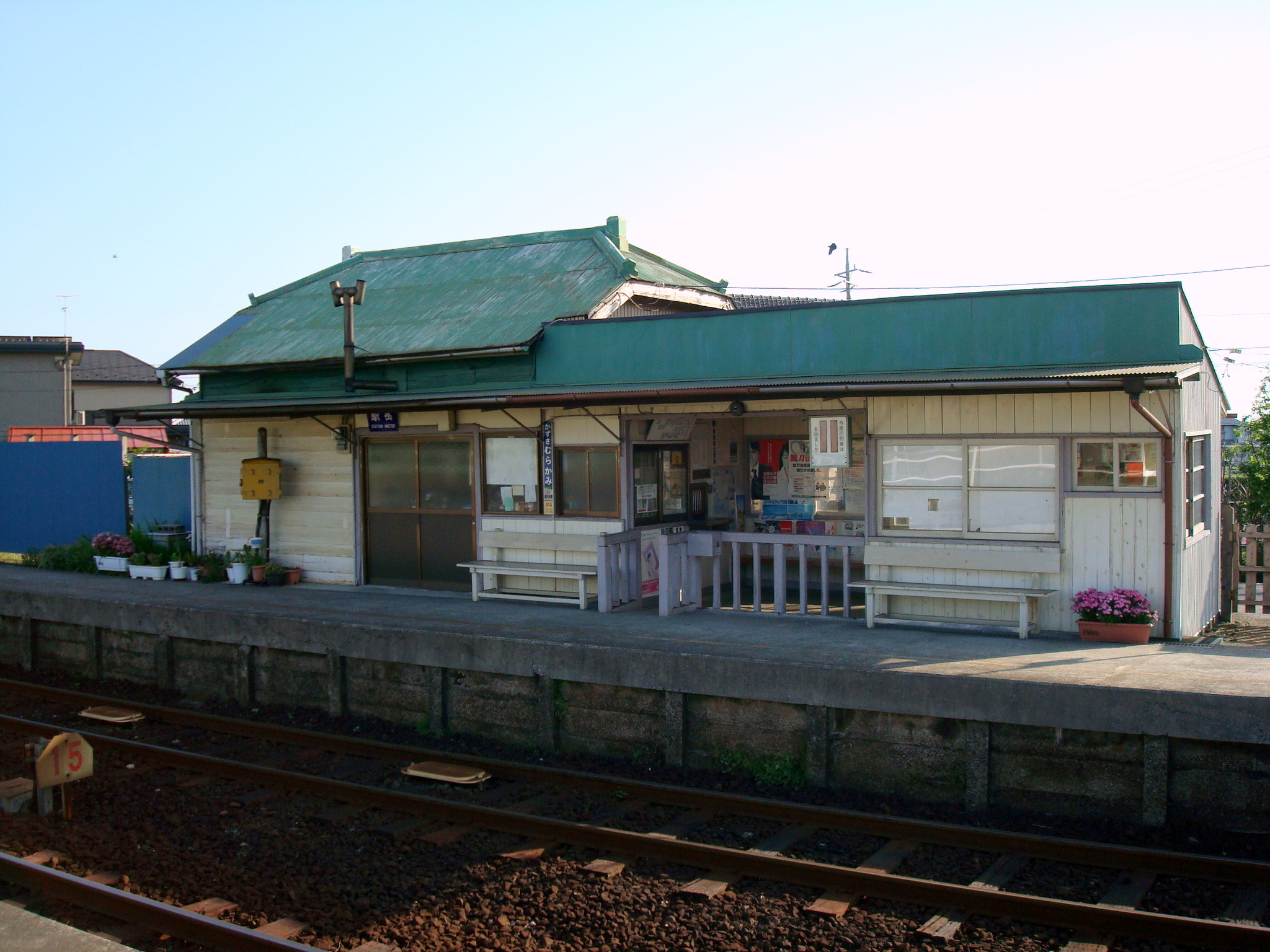
- Kazusa-Murakami Station in May 2008

General information
- Location: 1358-2 Murakami, Ichihara-shi, Chiba-ken; Japan
- Coordinates: 35°29′46.41″N 140°06′0.83″E
- Operator: Kominato Railway
- Line: Kominato Line
- Distance: 2.5 km from Goi
- Platforms: 2 side platforms
- Tracks: 2

Other information
- Website: Official website

History
- Opened: 25 February 1927

Passengers
- FY2010: 108 daily

Services
Preceding station	Kominato Railway	Following station
Goi Terminus	Kominato Line	Amaariki towards Kazusa-Nakano
Location
- Location within Chiba Prefecture Location within Japan

Kazusa-Murakami Station (上総村上駅, Kazusa-Murakami-eki) is a railway station on the Kominato Line, in Ichihara, Chiba Prefecture, Japan, operated by the private railway operator Kominato Railway.

== Lines ==
Kazusa-Murakami Station is served by the 39.1 km Kominato Line, and lies 2.5 km from the western terminus of the Kominato Line at Goi Station.

== Station layout ==
Kazusa-Murakami Station has two opposed side platforms serving two tracks. The station building, which dates from 1927, is attended.

=== Platforms ===
1	■ Kominato Line	for Goi
2	■ Kominato Line	for Kazusa-Ushiku and Kazusa-Nakano

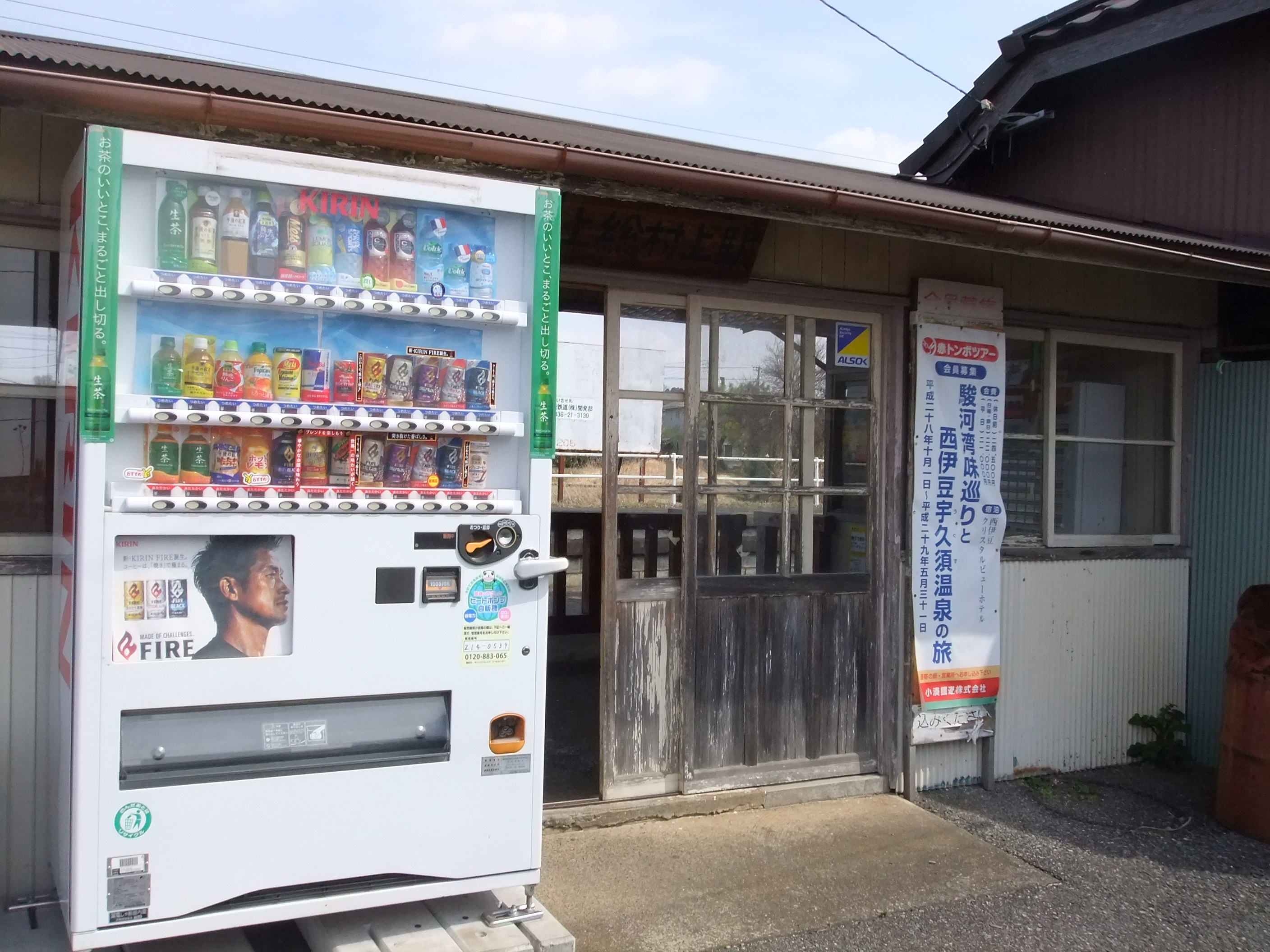
The entrance side of the station in March 2017

== History ==
Kazusa-Murakami Station was opened on February 25, 1927.

== Passenger statistics ==
In fiscal 2010, the station was used by an average of 108 passengers daily (boarding passengers only).

== See also ==
- List of railway stations in Japan
