= Kazusa-Ōkubo Station =

Railway station in Ichihara, Chiba Prefecture, Japan

Coordinates: 35°17′0.52″N 140°08′44.95″E

Kazusa-Ōkubo Station 上総大久保駅
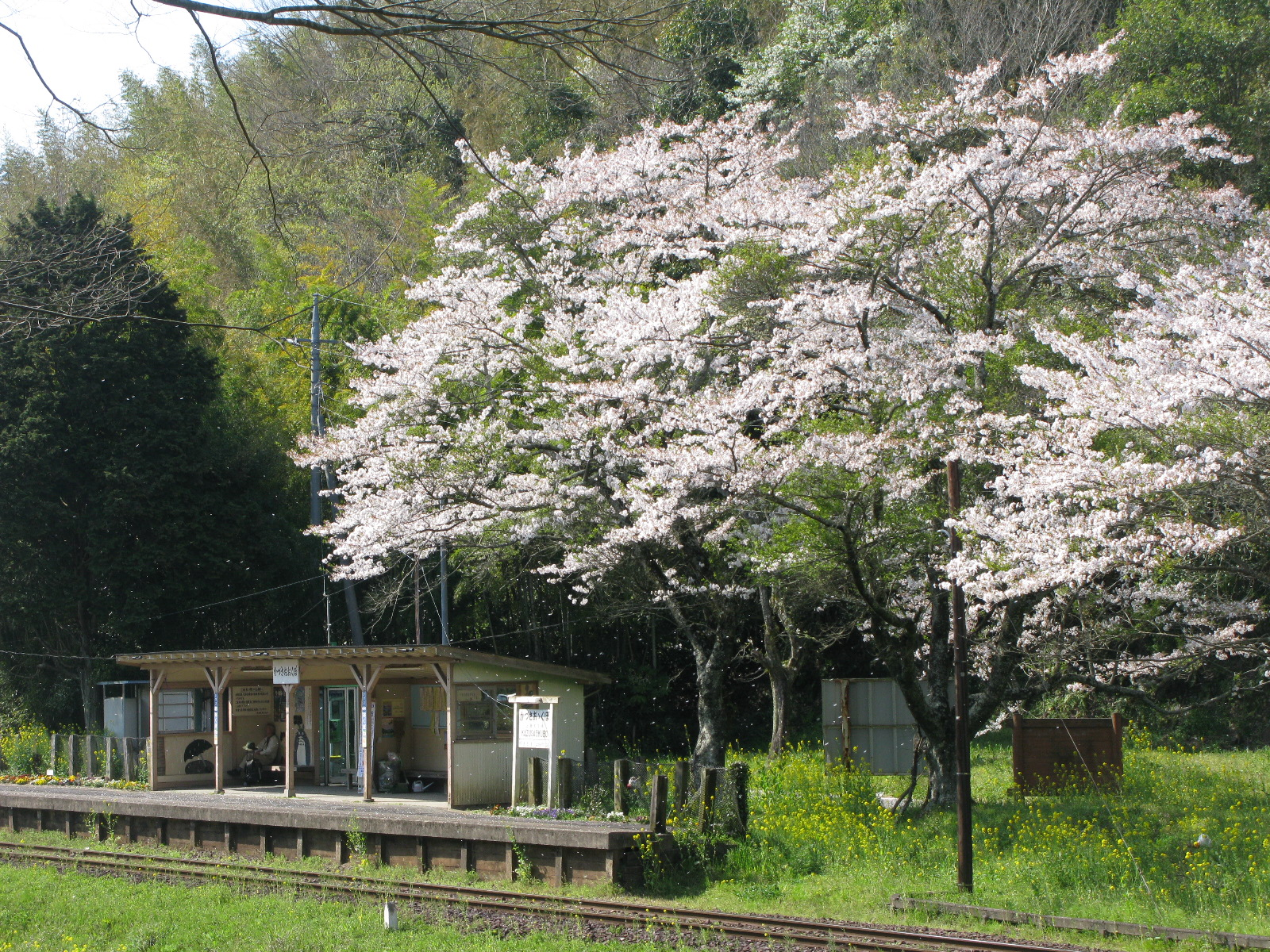

General information
- Location: Ōkubo 96-2, Ichihara, Chiba （千葉県市原市大久保96-2） Japan
- Operator: Kominato Railroad Company
- Line: Kominato Line

History
- Opened: 1928

Passengers
- 2008: 34 daily

Services
Preceding station	Kominato Railway	Following station
Tsukizaki towards Goi	Kominato Line	Yōrōkeikoku towards Kazusa-Nakano
Location

Kazusa-Ōkubo Station (上総大久保駅, Kazusa-Ōkubo-eki) is a railway station operated by the Kominato Railway Company's Kominato Line, located in Ichihara, Chiba Prefecture, Japan. It is 32.3 kilometers from the western terminus of the Kominato Line at Goi Station.

== History ==
Kazusa-Ōkubo Station was opened on May 16, 1928. It has been unattended since 1956.

== Lines ==
- Kominato Railway Company
  - Kominato Line

== Station layout ==
Kazusa-Ōkubo Station has a single side platform serving bidirectional traffic. There is a small rain shelter built on the platform, but no station building.

=== Platforms ===
1	■ Kominato Line	Goi; Kazusa-Ushiku, Kazusa-Nakano
