= Kōfūdai Station =

Kōfūdai Station (光風台駅) is the name of two train stations in Japan:

- Kōfūdai Station (Chiba)
- Kōfūdai Station (Osaka)
