= Kazusa-Yamada Station =

Railway station in Ichihara, Chiba Prefecture, Japan

Kazusa-Yamada Station 上総山田駅
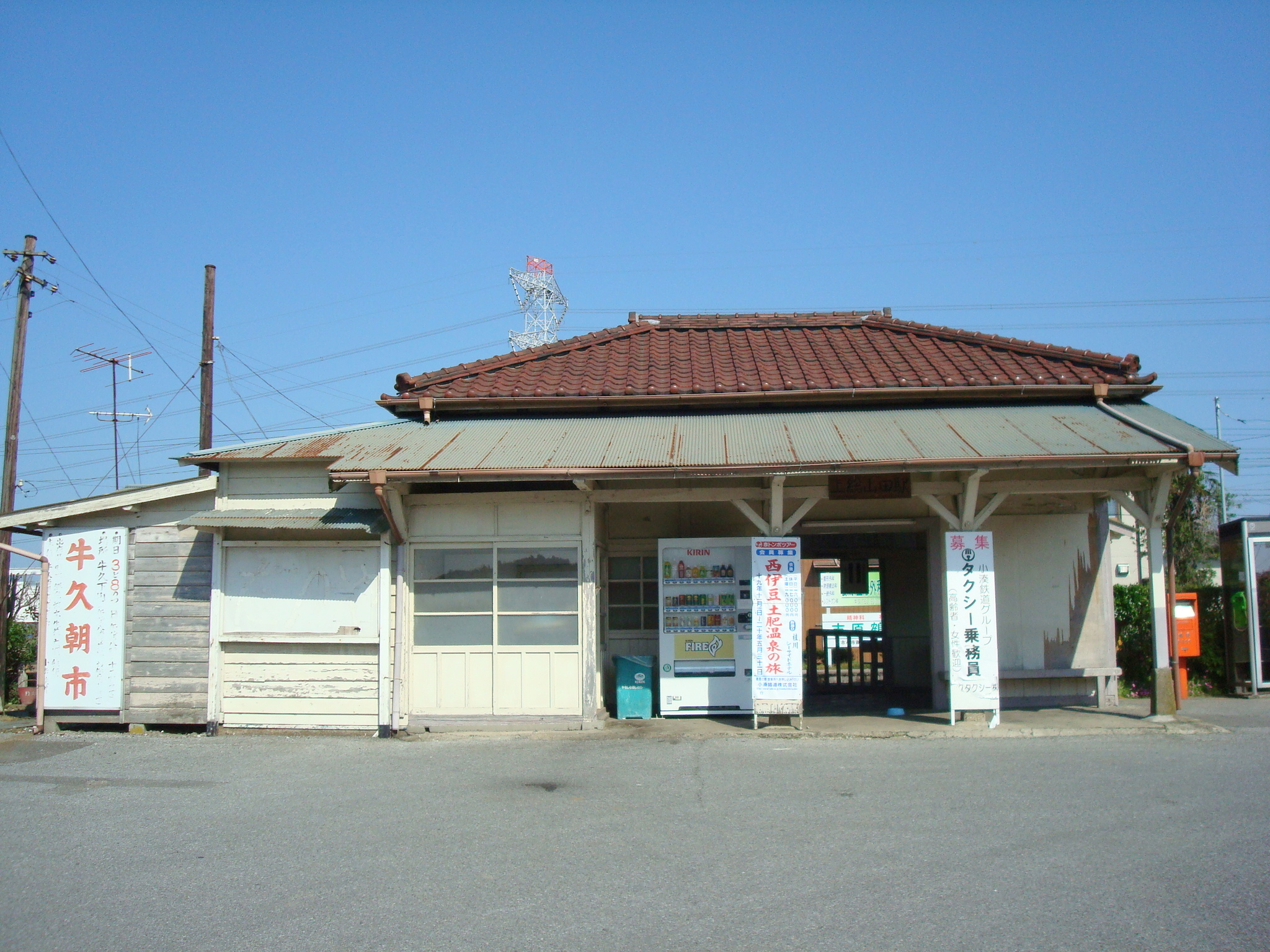

General information
- Location: 2079-3 Isogaya, Ichihara-shi, Chiba-ken; Japan
- Coordinates: 35°27′15.22″N 140°07′34.32″E
- Operator: Kominato Railway
- Line: Kominato Line
- Platforms: 2 side platforms
- Tracks: 2

History
- Opened: 7 March 1925
- Former names: Yōrōgawa (until 1954)

Passengers
- FY2008: 167 daily

Services
Preceding station	Kominato Railway	Following station
Kazusa-Mitsumata towards Goi	Kominato Line	Kōfūdai towards Kazusa-Nakano
Location
- Location within Chiba Prefecture Location within Japan

Kazusa-Yamada Station (上総山田駅, Kazusa-Yamada-eki) is a railway station on the Kominato Line, in Ichihara, Chiba Prefecture, Japan, operated by the private railway operator Kominato Railway.

== Lines ==
Kazusa-Yamada Station is served by the Kominato Line, and lies 8.6 km from the western terminus of the line at Goi Station.

== Station layout ==
Kazusa-Yamada Station has two opposed side platforms connected to the station building by a level crossing.

=== Platforms ===
1	■ Kominato Line	Goi
2	■ Kominato Line	Kazusa-Ushiku, Kazusa-Nakano

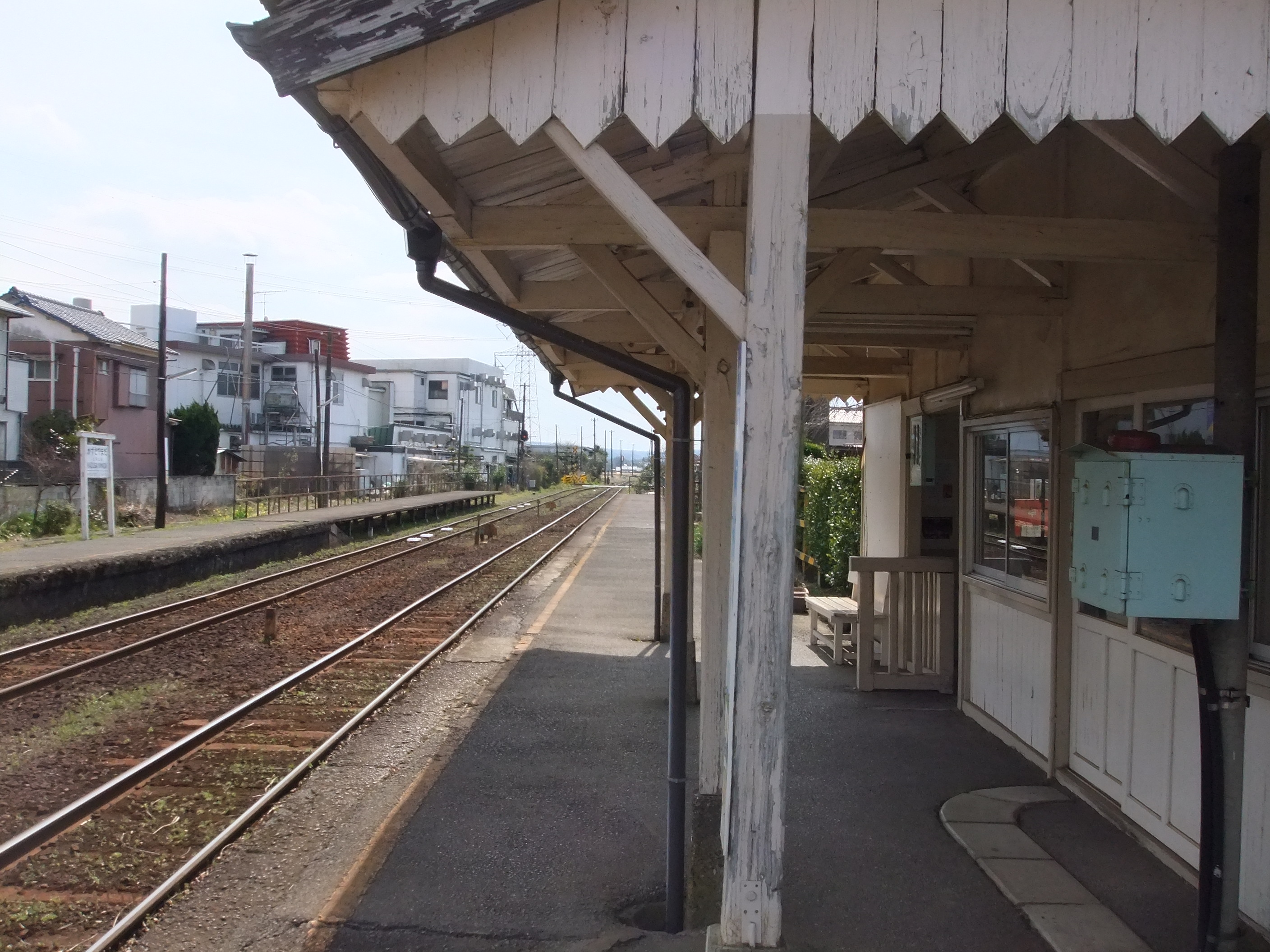
The platforms in March 2017

== History ==
Kazusa-Yamada Station was opened on March 7, 1925, as Yōrōgawa Station (養老川駅). It was renamed Kazusa-Yamada Station in January 1954. The station has been unattended since April 16, 2005.

== See also ==
- List of railway stations in Japan
