= Tsukizaki Station =

Railway station in Ichihara, Chiba Prefecture, Japan

Coordinates: 35°18′8.01″N 140°08′21.88″E

Tsukizaki Station 月崎駅
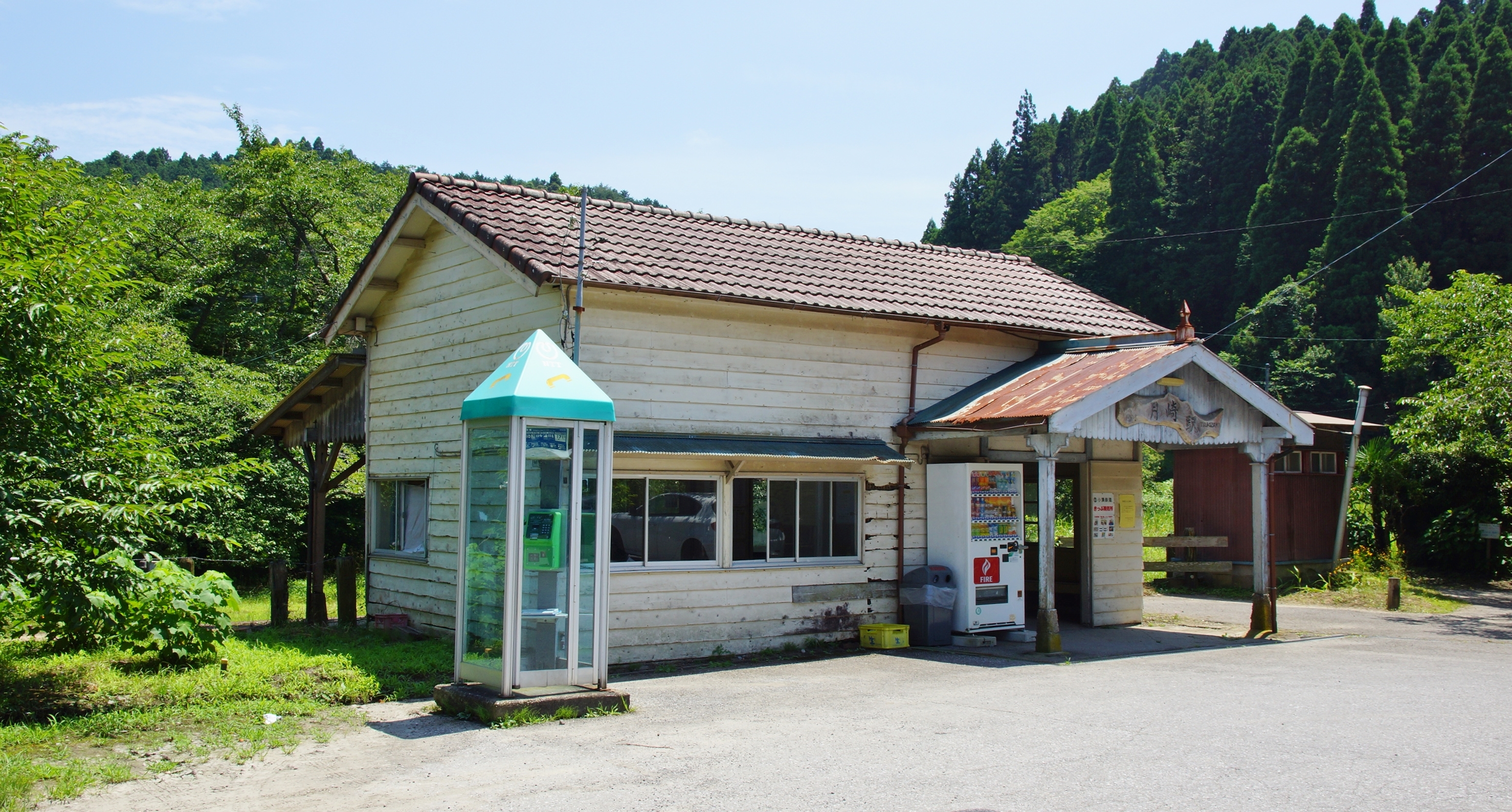
- Tsukizaki Station in July 2015

General information
- Location: 539 Tsukizaki, Ichihara, Chiba （千葉県市原市月崎539） Japan
- Operator: Kominato Railway
- Line: Kominato Line

History
- Opened: 1926

Passengers
- FY2010: 5 daily

Services
Preceding station	Kominato Railway	Following station
Itabu towards Goi	Kominato Line	Kazusa-Ōkubo towards Kazusa-Nakano
Location

Tsukizaki Station (月崎駅, Tsukizaki-eki) is a railway station on the Kominato Line in Ichihara, Chiba, Japan, operated by the third-sector railway operator Kominato Railway.

== Lines ==
Tsukizaki Station is served by the Kominato Railway Kominato Line, and lies 29.8 km from the western terminus of the line at Goi Station.

== Station layout ==
The station has a single side platform serving a bidirectional single track. There is an additional island platform next to the running line, but this is now disused. The old, wooden, station building is unstaffed, and has a waiting room only, and no ticket gate.

=== Platforms ===
-	■ Kominato Line	for Kazusa-Ushiku and Goi for Kazusa-Nakano

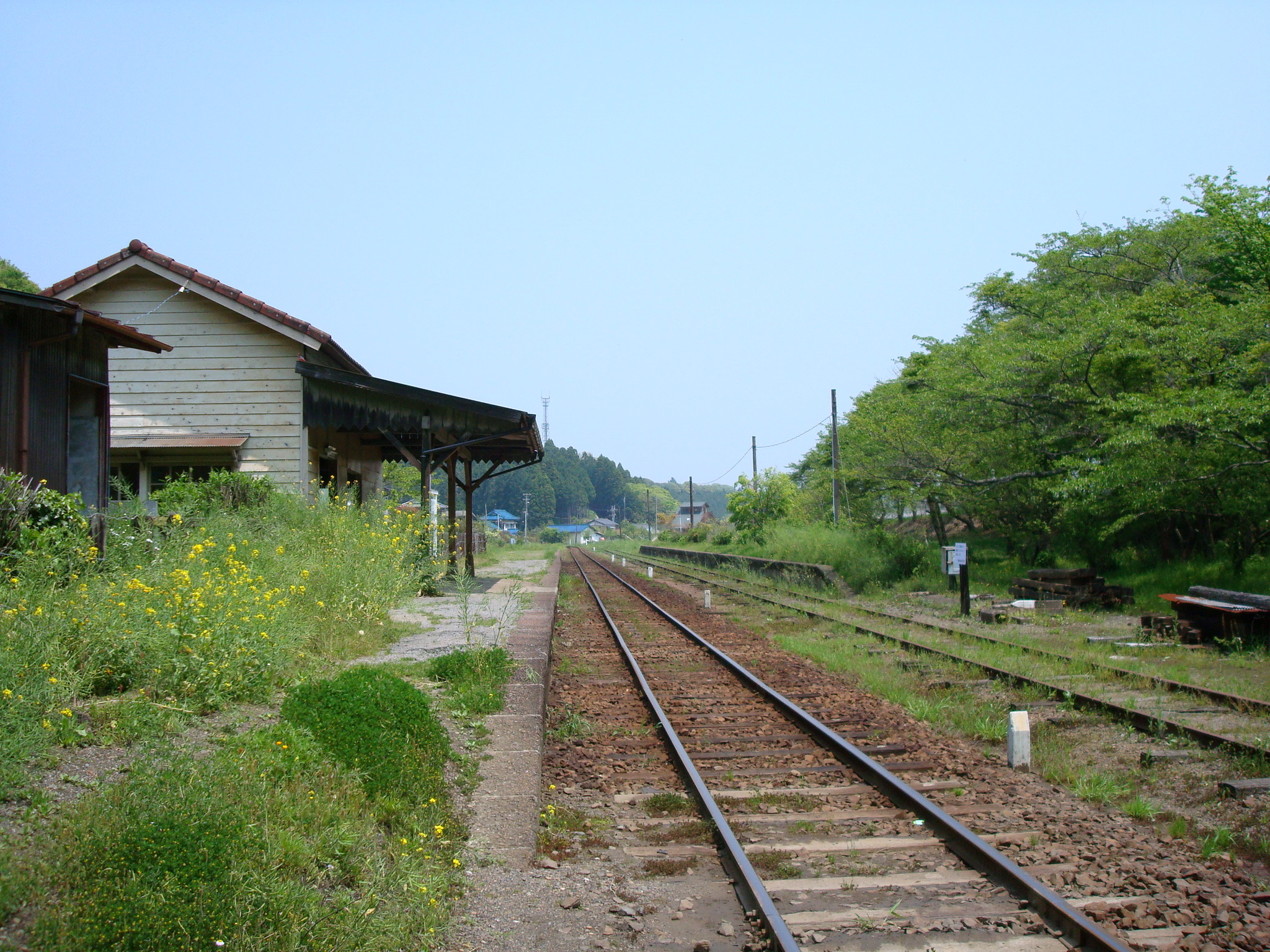
An overview of the station platforms, April 2008

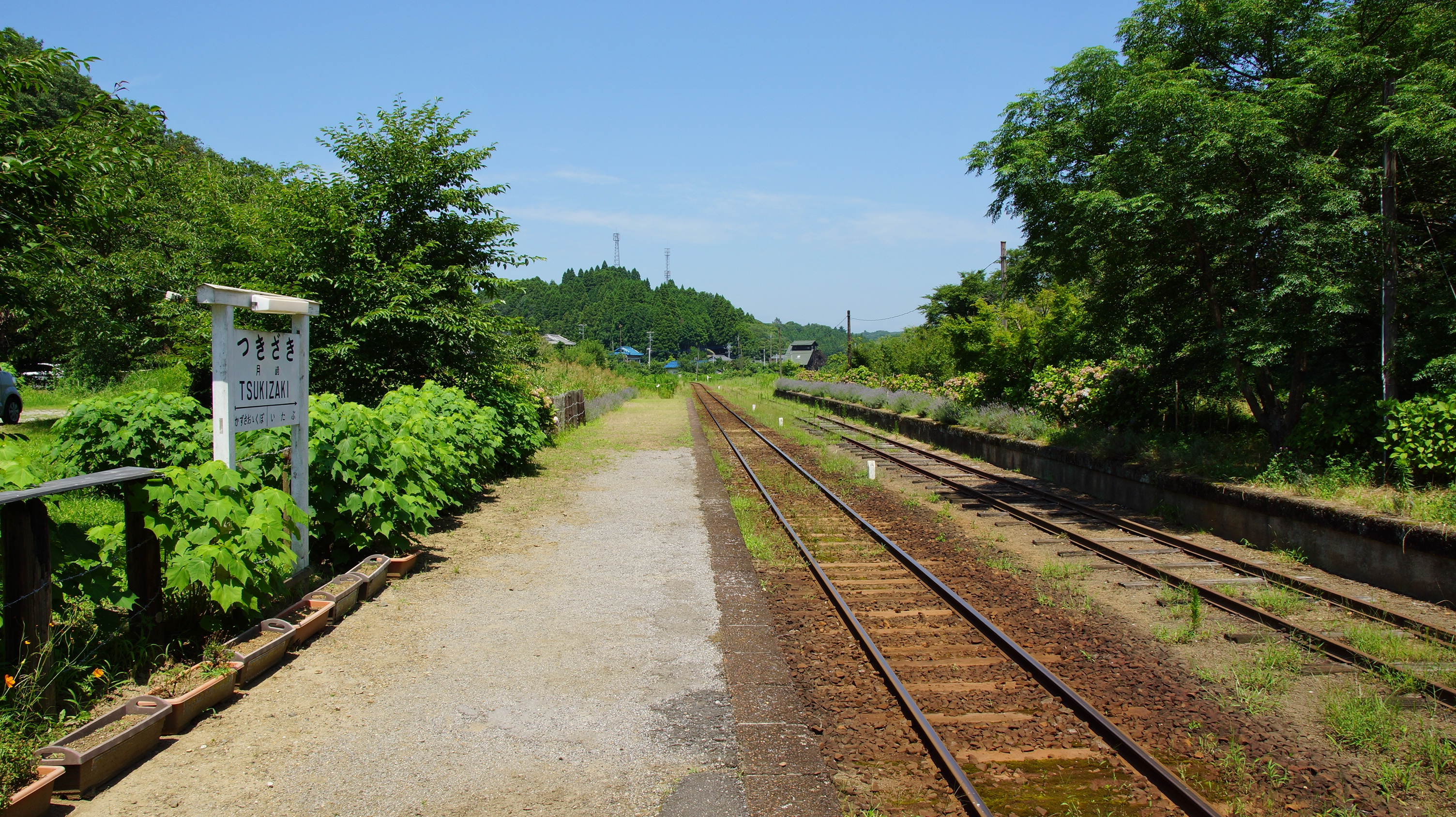
The platform looking north (toward Goi), with the disused track and platform on the right, July 2015

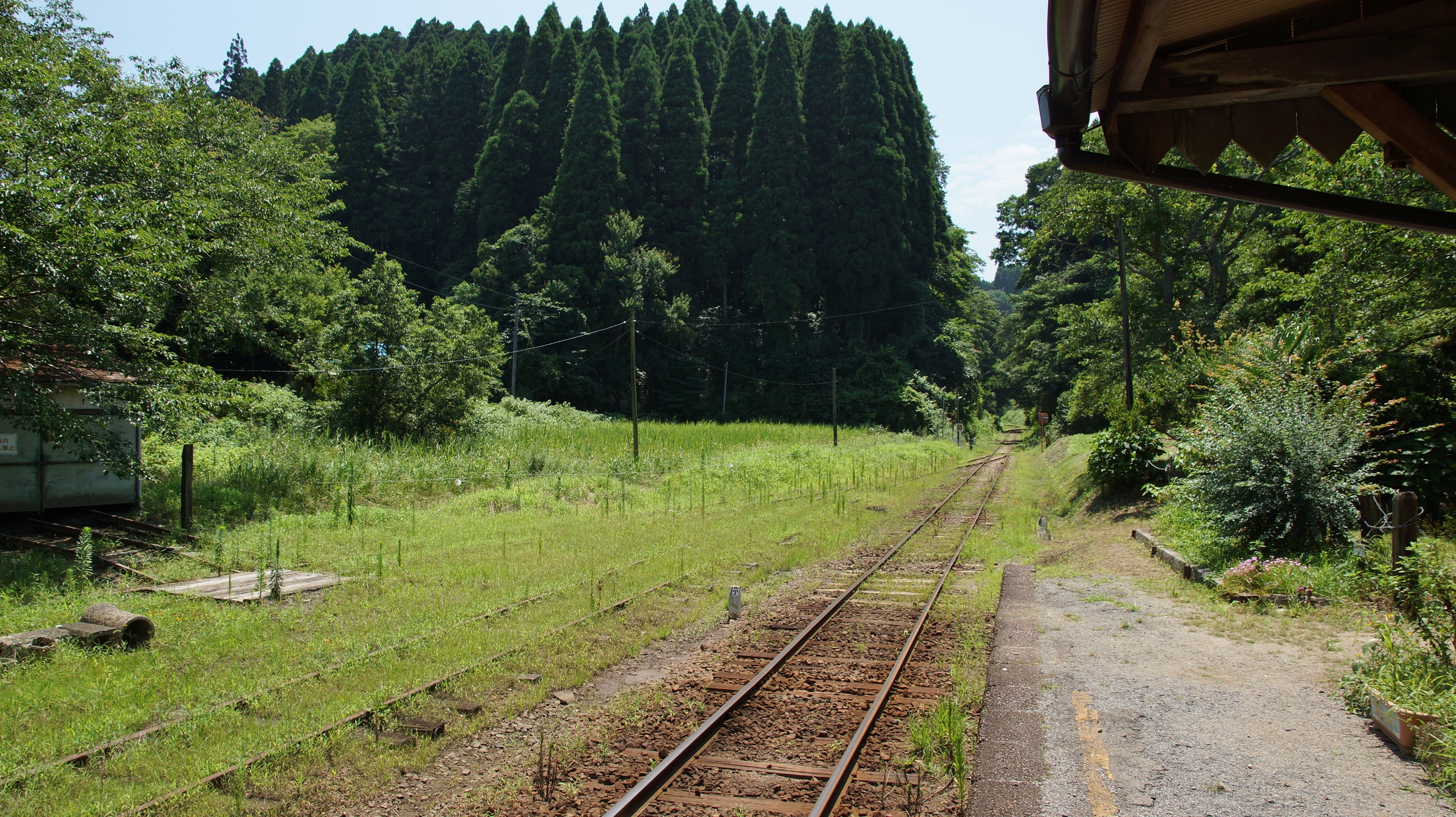
The view from the platform, looking south (toward Kazusa-Nakano), July 2015

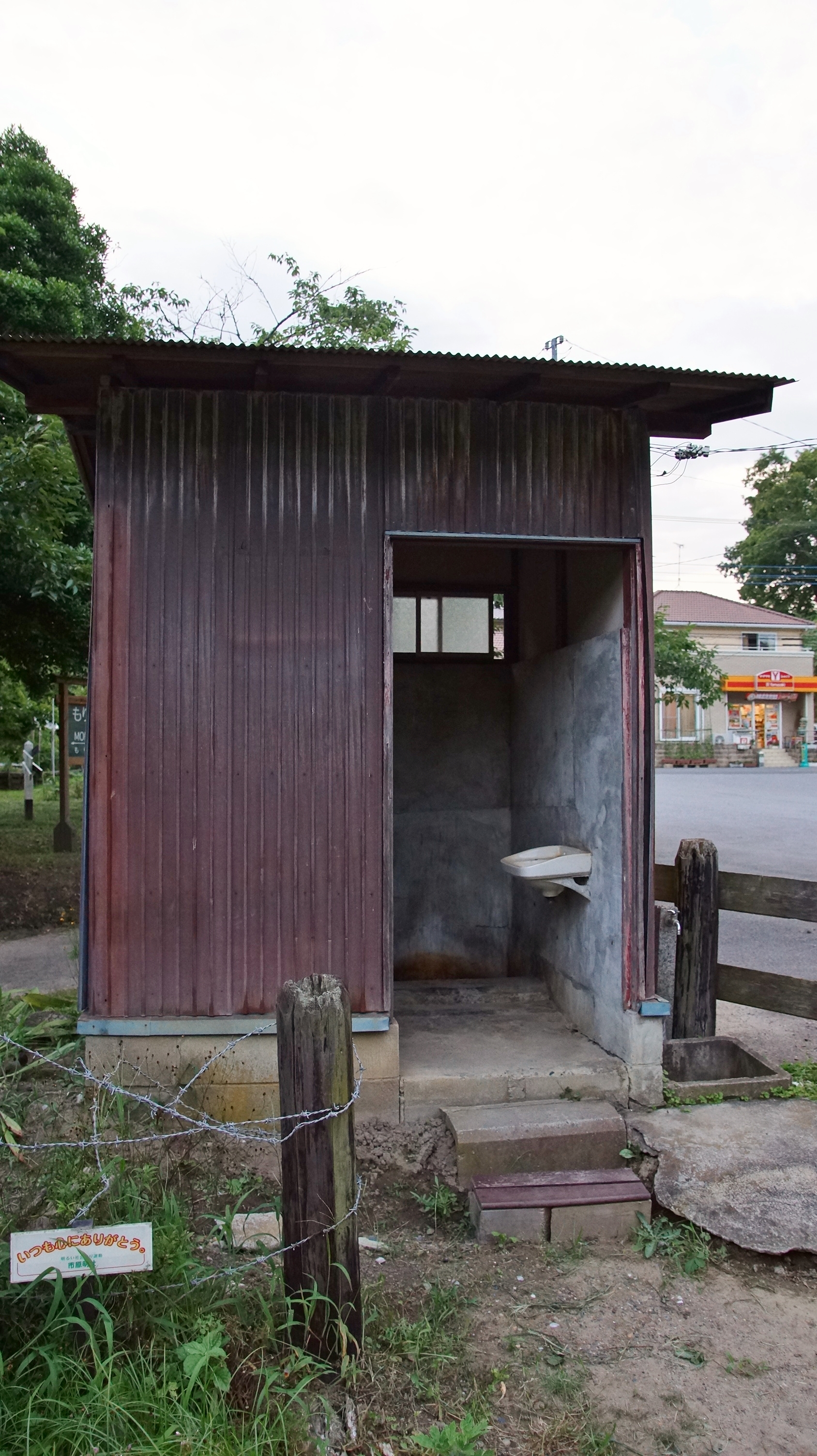
The station toilet, July 2015

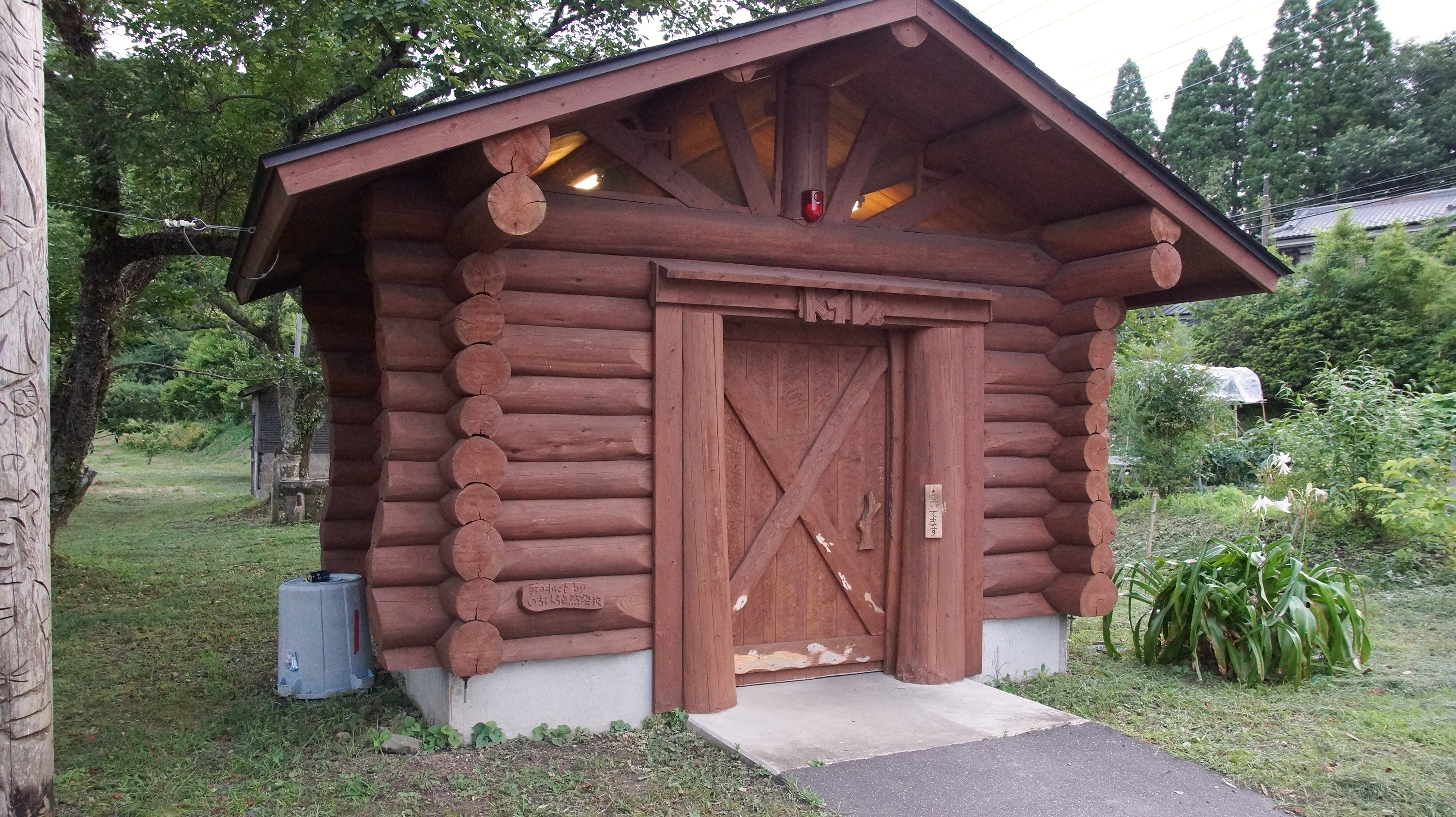
The public toilet next to the station, July 2015

== History ==
The station opened on September 1, 1926. It has been unstaffed since 1 April 1967.

== Passenger statistics ==
In fiscal 2010, the station was used by an average of 5 passengers daily (boarding passengers only).

== See also ==
- List of railway stations in Japan
