= Kazusa-Tsurumai Station =

Railway station in Ichihara, Chiba Prefecture, Japan

Coordinates: 35°22′52.92″N 140°09′54.46″E

Kazusa-Tsurumai Station 上総鶴舞駅
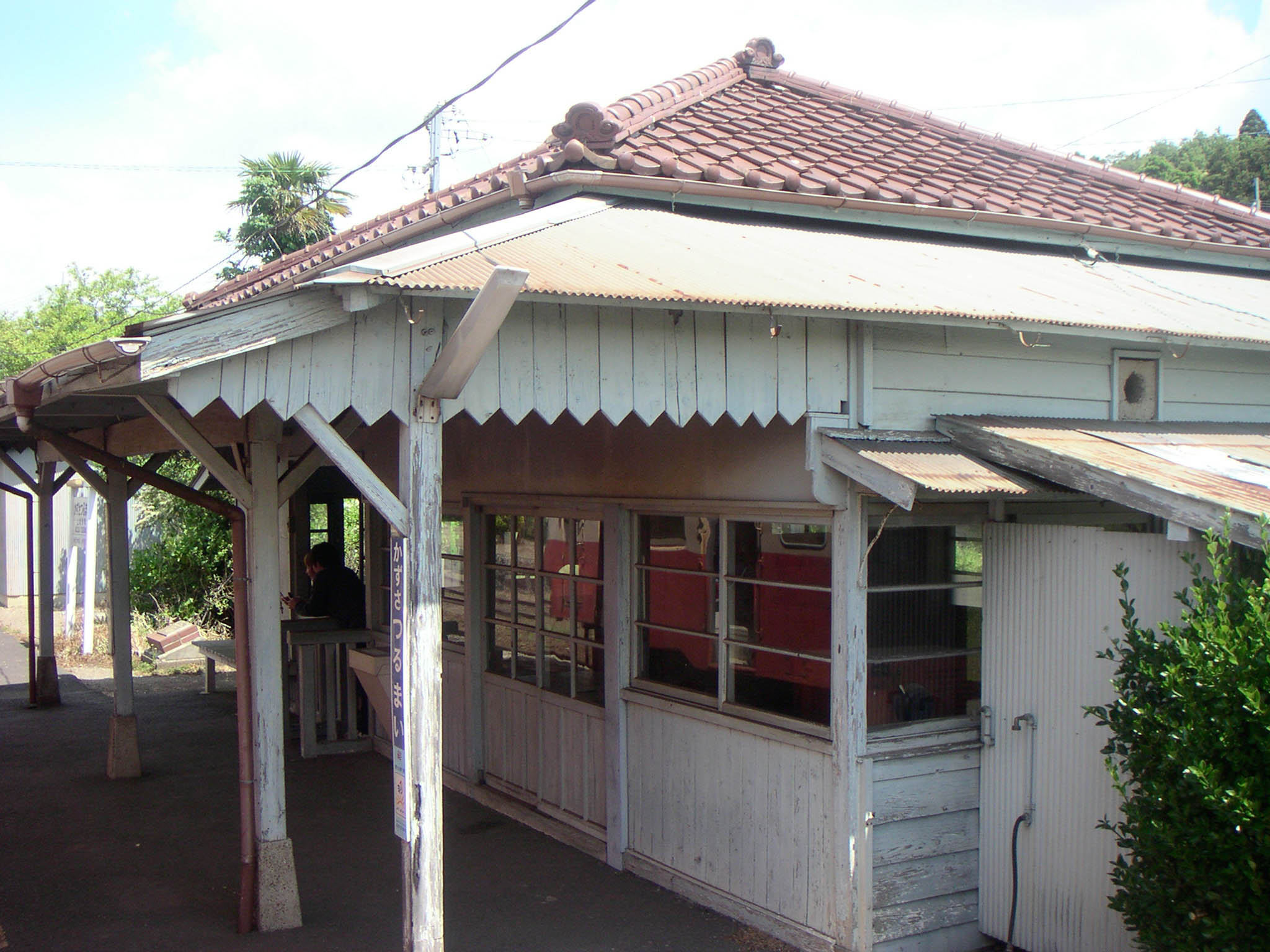

General information
- Location: Ikewada 898-2, Ichihara, Chiba （千葉県市原市池和田898-2） Japan
- Operator: Kominato Railroad Company
- Line: Kominato Line

History
- Opened: 1925
- Former names: Tsurumaimachi (until 1958)

Passengers
- 2008: 15 daily

Services
Preceding station	Kominato Railway	Following station
Kazusa-Kawama towards Goi	Kominato Line	Kazusa-Kubo towards Kazusa-Nakano
Location

Kazusa-Tsurumai Station (上総鶴舞駅, Kazusa-Tsurumai-eki) is a railway station operated by the Kominato Railway Company's Kominato Line, located in Ichihara, Chiba Prefecture, Japan. It is 20.0 kilometers from the western terminus of the Kominato Line at Goi Station.

== History ==
Kazusa-Tsurumai Station was opened on March 7, 1925, as Tsurumaimachi Station (鶴舞町駅, Tsurumaimachi eki). It was renamed to its present name on January 1, 1958. It has been unattended since 1998.

== Lines ==
- Kominato Railway Company
  - Kominato Line

== Station layout ==
Kazusa-Tsurumai Station has a single side platform serving bidirectional traffic. The overgrown remnants of an unused island platform are still located to one side. The old wooden station building retains a ticket gate, but has been unattended for over a decade.

=== Platforms ===
1	■ Kominato Line	Kazusa-Ushiku, Goi; Kazusa-Nakano
