= Kominato Line =

Railway line in Chiba Prefecture, Japan

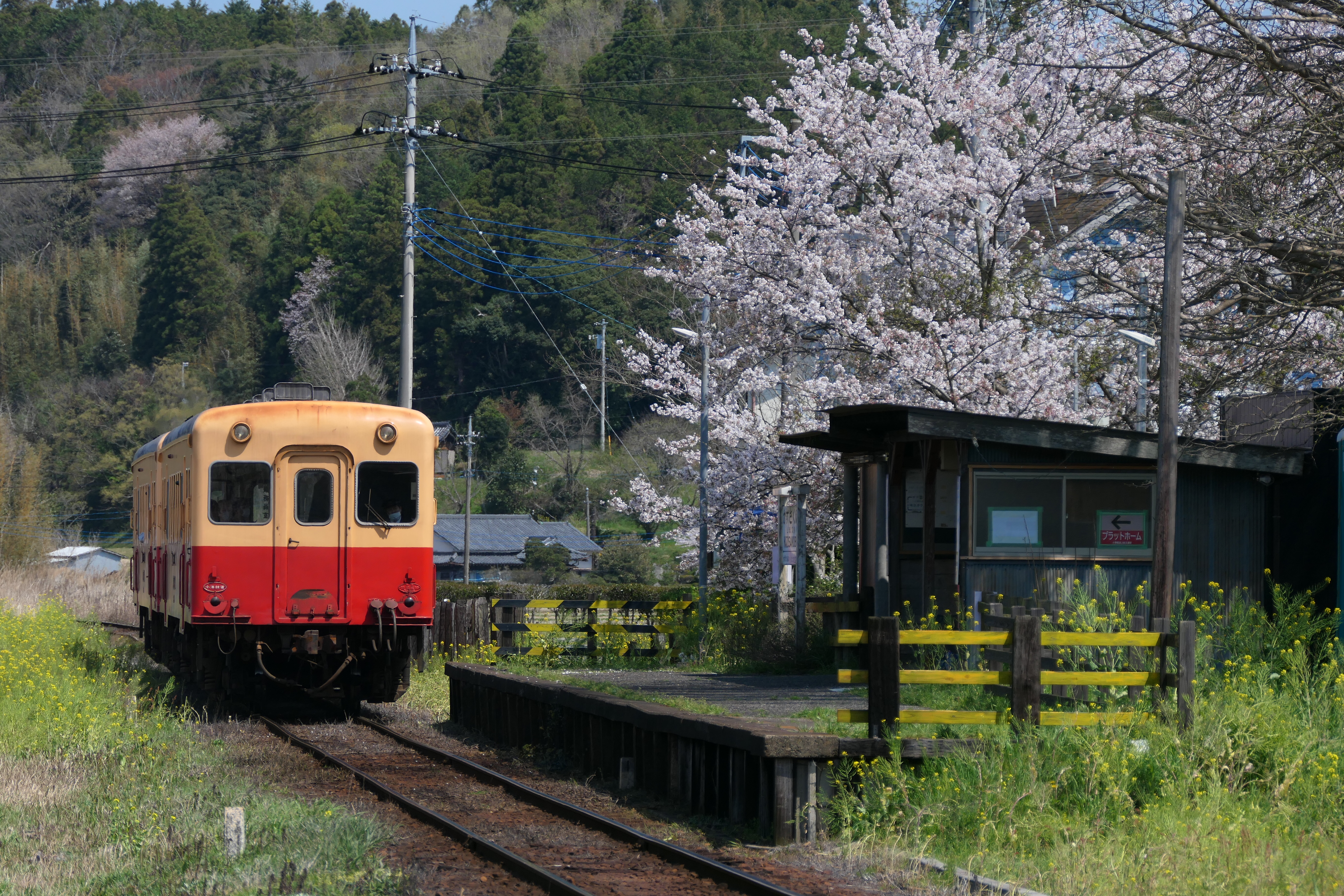
- A KiHa 200 diesel car on the Kominato Line in March 2020

Overview
- Native name: 小湊鉄道線
- Status: In operation
- Owner: Kominato Railway
- Locale: Chiba Prefecture
- Termini: Goi; Kazusa-Nakano
- Stations: 18

Service
- Type: Passenger
- Operator: Kominato Railway
- Rolling stock: KiHa 200 series DMU, KiHa 40 series DMU

History
- Opened: 1925

Technical
- Line length: 39.1 km (24.3 mi)
- Num of tracks: Entire line single tracked
- Character: Rural
- Track gauge: 1,067 mm (3 ft 6 in)
- Electrification: None
- Operating speed: 65 km/h (40 mph)
Route map

The Kominato Railway Line (小湊鉄道線, Kominato Tetsudō-sen) is a railway line in Chiba Prefecture, Japan, operated by the private railway operator Kominato Railway (小湊鐵道, Kominato Tetsudō). It extends from the west coast of central Bōsō Peninsula (where it connects with the JR Uchibō Line at Goi) to Kazusa-Nakano in the town of Ōtaki (where it connects to the Isumi Railway Isumi Line). All of its stations with the exception of the Kazusa-Nakano terminus are within the city of Ichihara. Diesel cars manufactured between 1961 and 1977 run through the scenic hilly areas of Bōsō Peninsula, and the line has many antique station buildings.

== Stations ==
Station	Japanese	Distance (km)	Transfers	Location	
Goi	五井	0.0	Uchibō Line	Ichihara	Chiba Prefecture
Kazusa-Murakami	上総村上	2.5		Ichihara	Chiba Prefecture
Amaariki	海士有木	5.4		Ichihara	Chiba Prefecture
Kazusa-Mitsumata	上総三又	7.2		Ichihara	Chiba Prefecture
Kazusa-Yamada	上総山田	8.6		Ichihara	Chiba Prefecture
Kōfūdai	光風台	10.6		Ichihara	Chiba Prefecture
Umatate	馬立	12.4		Ichihara	Chiba Prefecture
Kazusa-Ushiku	上総牛久	16.4		Ichihara	Chiba Prefecture
Kazusa-Kawama	上総川間	18.5		Ichihara	Chiba Prefecture
Kazusa-Tsurumai	上総鶴舞	20.0		Ichihara	Chiba Prefecture
Kazusa-Kubo	上総久保	22.0		Ichihara	Chiba Prefecture
Takataki	高滝	23.8		Ichihara	Chiba Prefecture
Satomi	里見	25.7		Ichihara	Chiba Prefecture
Itabu	飯給	27.5		Ichihara	Chiba Prefecture
Tsukizaki	月崎	29.8		Ichihara	Chiba Prefecture
Kazusa-Ōkubo	上総大久保	32.3		Ichihara	Chiba Prefecture
Yōrōkeikoku	養老渓谷	34.9		Ichihara	Chiba Prefecture
Kazusa-Nakano	上総中野	39.1	Isumi Line	Ōtaki	Chiba Prefecture

- All trains stop at every station.

== Rolling stock ==
As of July 2026, the railway owns and operates a fleet of 14 KiHa 200 series diesel cars, built by Nippon Sharyo between 1961 and 1977, and numbered 201 to 214. All except cars 209 and 210 are air-conditioned, the former of which is out of service.

200 series build histories
Number	Manufacturer	Build date	Length (mm)	Weight (t)
201	Nippon Sharyo	1961	20,000	30.0
202	Nippon Sharyo	1961	20,000	30.0
203	Nippon Sharyo	1963	20,000	30.0
204	Nippon Sharyo	1963	20,000	30.0
205	Nippon Sharyo	1964	20,000	30.0
206	Nippon Sharyo	1964	20,000	30.0
207	Nippon Sharyo	1970	20,000	30.0
208	Nippon Sharyo	1970	20,000	30.0
209	Nippon Sharyo	1970	20,000	30.0
210	Nippon Sharyo	1970	20,000	30.0
211	Nippon Sharyo	1975	20,000	30.0
212	Nippon Sharyo	1975	20,000	30.0
213	Nippon Sharyo	1977	20,000	30.0
214	Nippon Sharyo	1977	20,000	30.0

In 2020 and 2021, a number of KiHa 40 series trains (numbers 1006, 2018, 2019, 2021, 2026) were withdrawn from JR East's Tadami Line, Tsugaru Line, Gono Line, and Oga Line, and transferred to Kominato Railway. The vehicles KiHa 40-2021 and 40-2026 were renamed KiHa 40-1 and 40-2 respectively, and entered regular passenger service in 2021, replacing some of the series KiHa 200 cars. They were first run alongside the Express "SATOYAMA" service on 23 April 2020.

The remaining vehicles, KiHa 40-2018, 40-2019, and 40-1006, were renamed KiHa 40-3, 40-4, and 40-5, and entered service between May and October 2022.

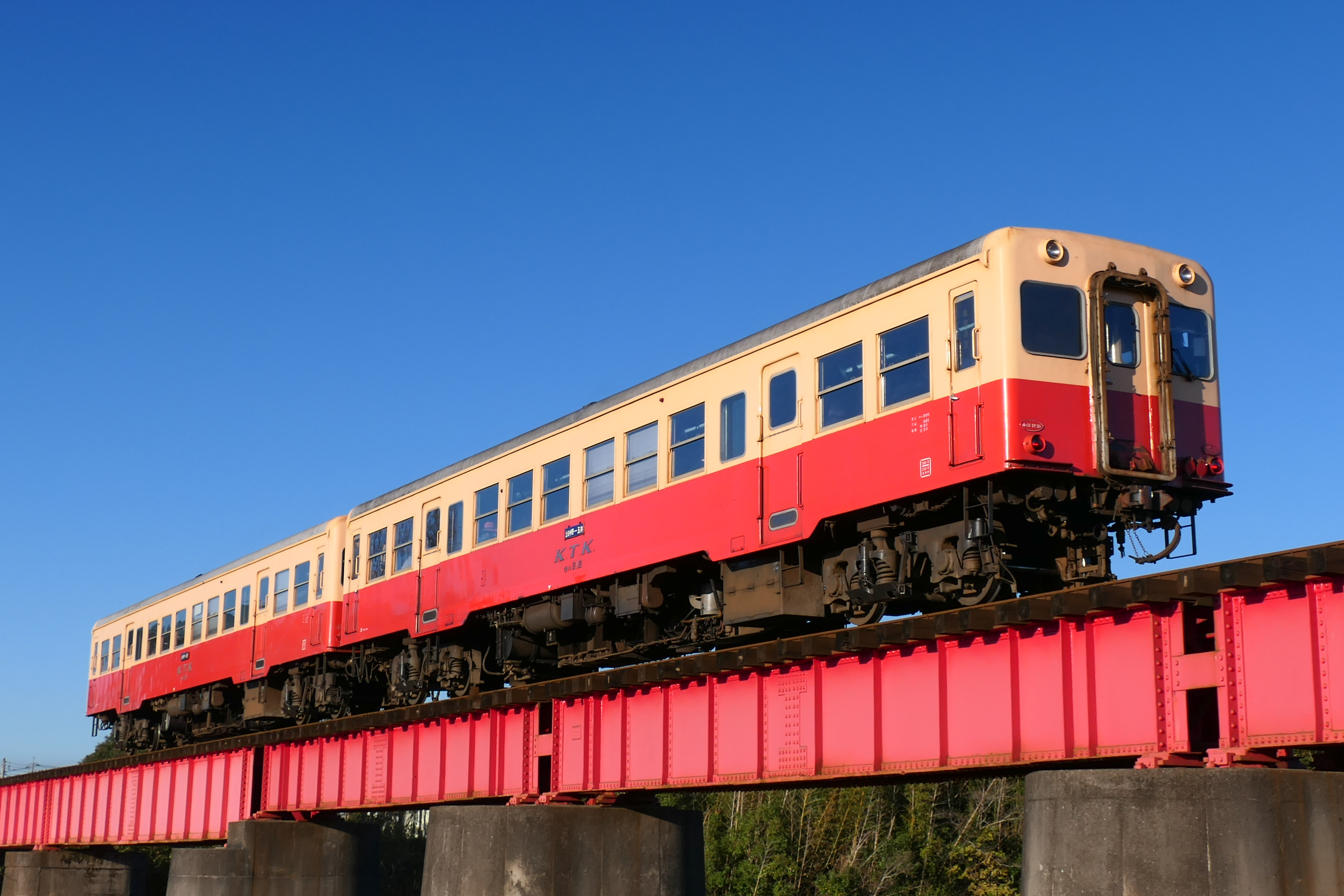
KiHa 200 DMU car in November 2021

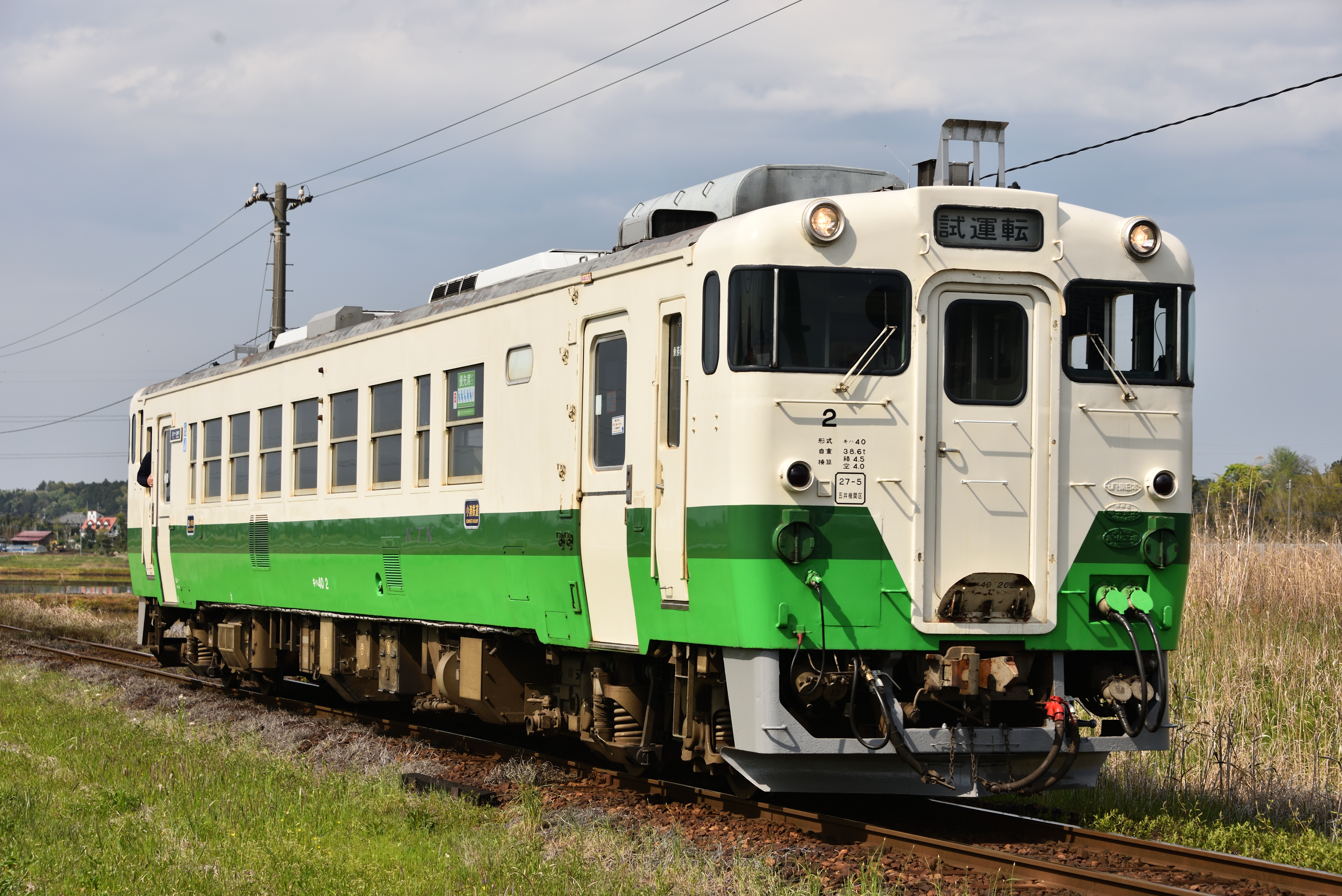
KiHa 40 with unchanged JR East coloring

KiHa 40 series build histories
Number	Manufacturer	Build date	Length (mm)	Weight (t)
40-1	Fuji Heavy Industries	1979	21,300	38.6
40-2	Fuji Heavy Industries	1979	21,300	38.6
40-3	Fuji Heavy Industries	1979	21,300	38.6
40-4	Fuji Heavy Industries	1979	21,300	38.6
40-5	Fuji Heavy Industries	1979	21,300	38.6

Beginning on 15 November 2015, a Satoyama Torokko (里山トロッコ) open-sided tourist train hauled by a replica steam locomotive powered by a diesel engine entered service on the line, operating generally on weekends only. The train consists of four cars, two of which have open sides, with a total capacity of 144 passengers. It is hauled by diesel locomotive number DB4, a replica of a German Orenstein & Koppel-built steam locomotive formerly operated on the line from 1924 until the 1940s, powered by a Volvo diesel engine.

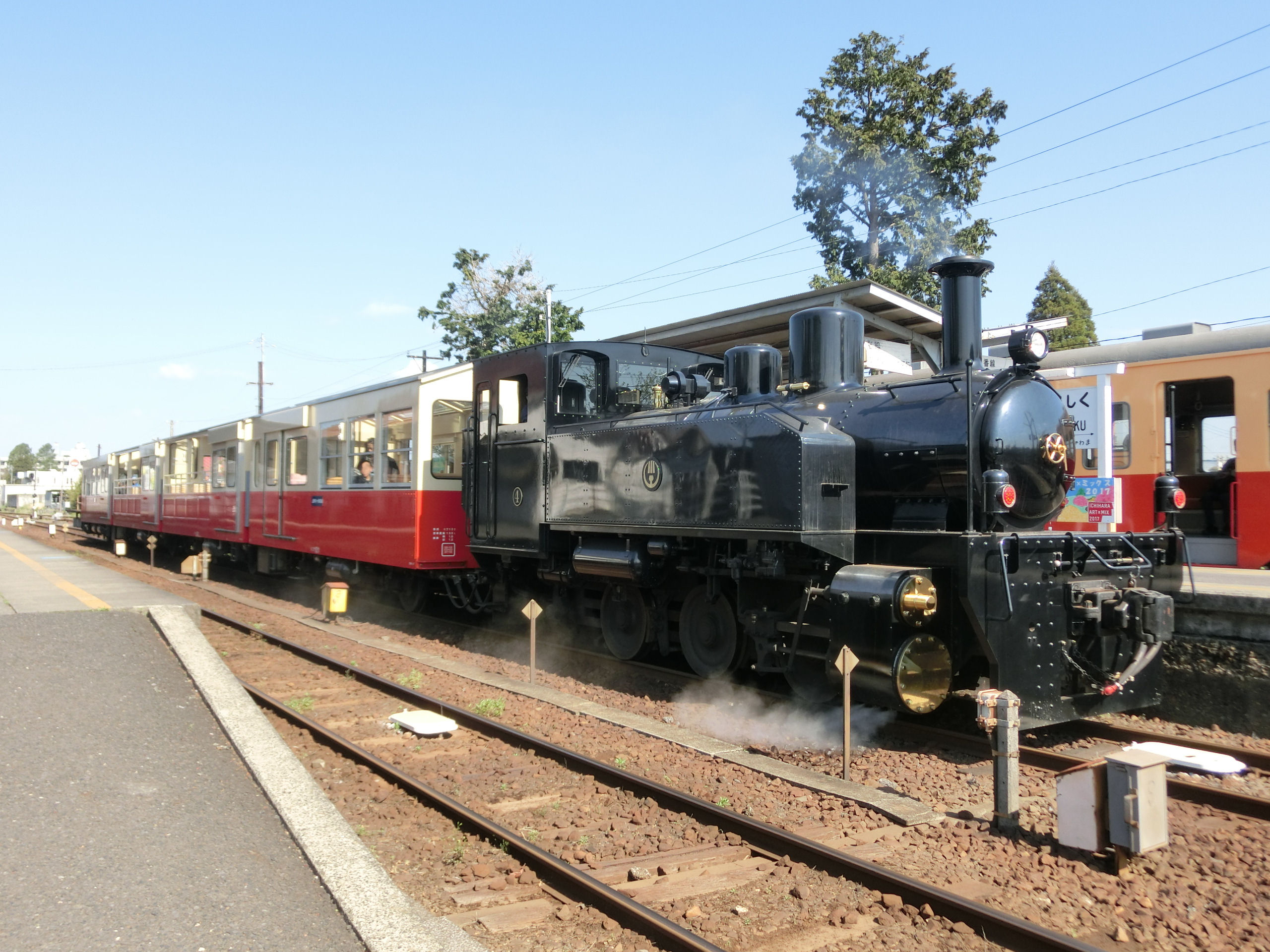
Diesel locomotive DB4 on the Satoyama Torokko in April 2017

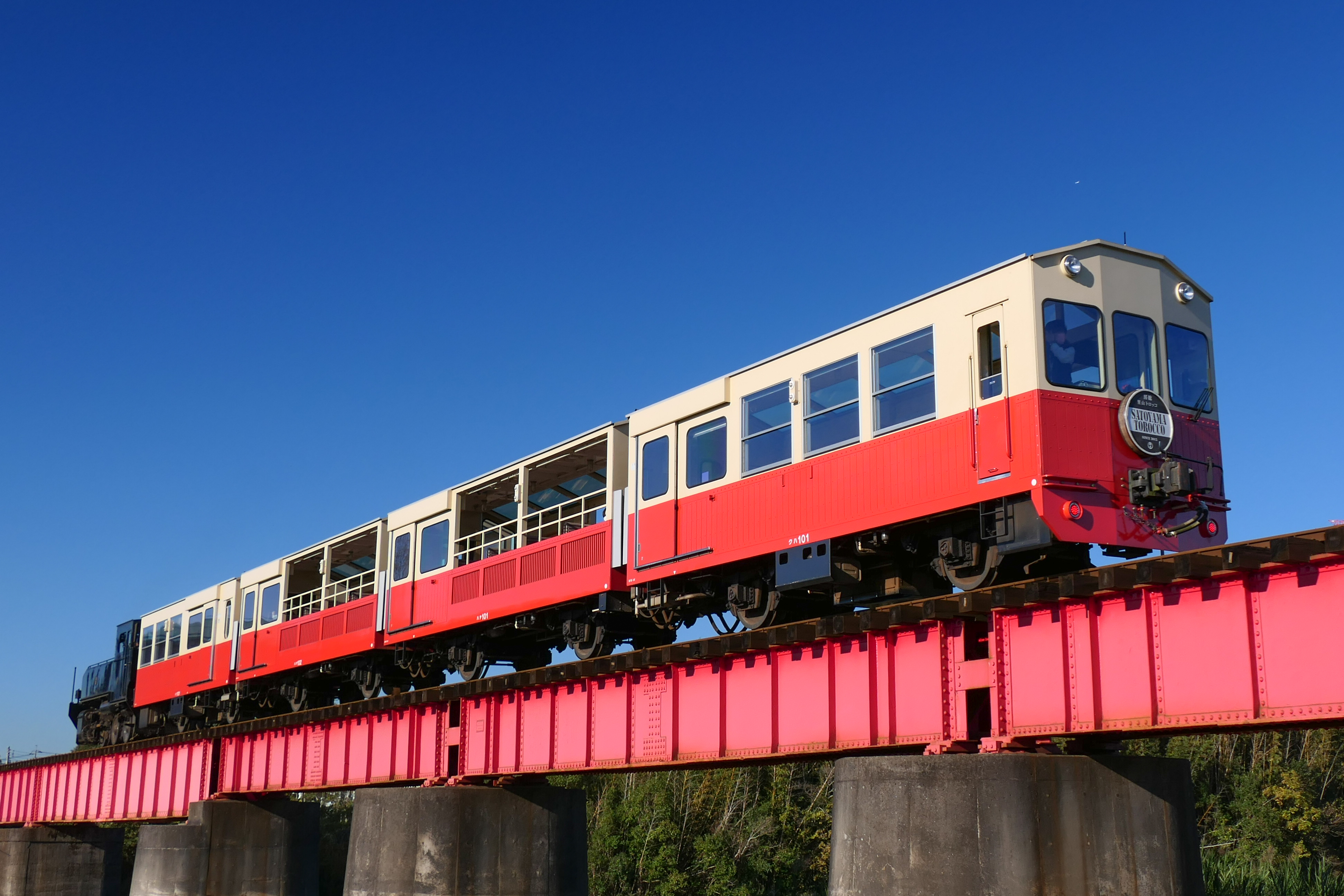
Satoyama Torokko passenger car in November 2021

== History ==
Plans for a railroad bisecting the Bōsō Peninsula were drafted by the Railway Ministry in the Meiji period, with the aim of connecting the town of Kominato (now part of Kamogawa City), a town facing the Pacific and famous as the birthplace of Nichiren, for economic and military reasons. However, due to lack of profitability of other lines in the area, the idea was shelved.

The project was revived in 1917 by noted entrepreneur Yasuda Zenjirō, who used the financial resources of the Yasuda zaibatsu to fund over half of the construction costs, and who imported two steam locomotives from the Baldwin Locomotive Works in Philadelphia, Pennsylvania to run on the new line.

The Kominato Railway was founded on 31 May 1917, opening the initial section of the line from Goi to Satomi on 7 May 1925. The line was extended to Tsukizaki on 1 September 1926, and reached its present eastern terminus at Kazusa-Nakano on 16 May 1928. Diesel railcars were introduced on the line from this date. At Kazusa-Nakano, the line connected with the Japanese Government Railways Kihara Line, which provided a route to the eastern shore of the Bōsō Peninsula and so plans to extend the line further to Kominato Town were subsequently abandoned.

In 1942, the line was forced to merge with the Keisei Electric Railway, and remained a subsidiary of that company after the end of World War II. On 21 March 1962, the remaining steam locomotives were retired (and are currently on display at Goi Station). Freight operations were phased out by 1 October 1969. A new ATS was installed in early 1995. On 12 April 2006, heavy rains washed away a portion of the tracks between Kazusa-Nakano and Yōrōkeikoku, leading to a two-month disruption in services.

In 2017, the line received a Good Design Award from the Japan Institute of Design Promotion.
