= Kominato Railway KiHa 200 series =

Japanese train type

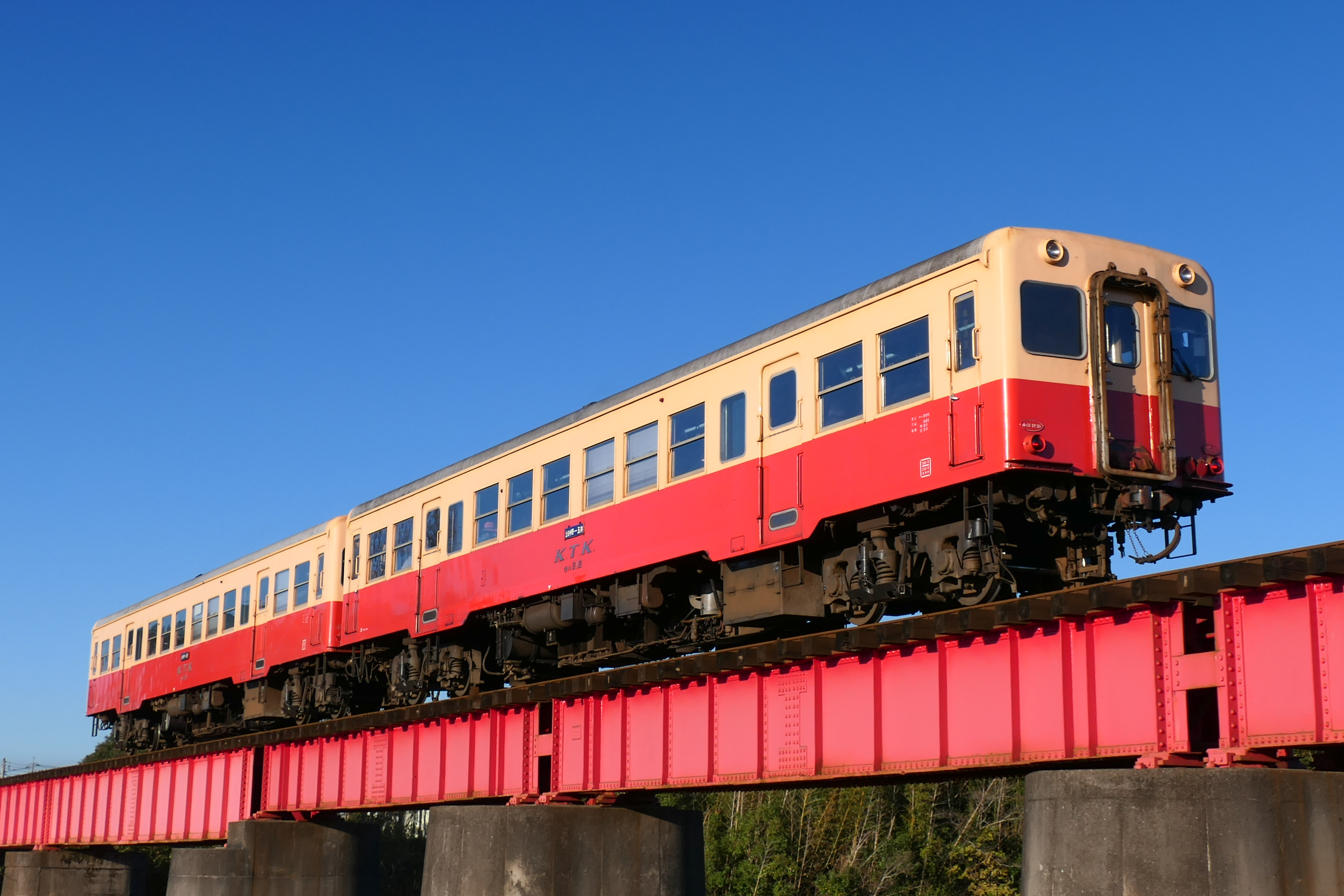
- A pair of KiHa 200 series cars in November 2021
- In service: 1962–
- Built at: Nippon Sharyo
- Constructed: 1961–1977
- Number built: 14 vehicles
- Number in service: 14 vehicles (as of 1 April 2016)
- Formation: Single-car units
- Fleet numbers: KiHa 201–214
- Capacity: 160 passengers
- Operators: Kominato Railway
- Depots: Goi
- Lines served: Kominato Line

Specifications
- Car body construction: Steel
- Car length: 20,000 mm (65 ft 7 in)
- Width: 2,903 mm (9 ft 6.3 in)
- Height: 3,880 mm (12 ft 9 in)
- Doors: Two per side
- Prime mover(s): DMH17c
- Track gauge: 1,067 mm (3 ft 6 in)

The Kominato Railway KiHa 200 series (小湊鐵道キハ200形, Kominato Tetsudō KiHa 200-gata) is a single-car diesel multiple unit (DMU) train type operated by the third-sector railway operator Kominato Railway on the 39.1 km (24.3 mi) Kominato Line between Goi and Kazusa-Nakano in Chiba Prefecture, Japan, since 1962. As of 1 April 2016, all 14 of the Kiha 200 series cars built are in service.

== History ==
14 KiHa 200 series cars were built between 1961 and 1977. The first cars entered service in January 1962.

=== Individual build histories ===
The individual car build histories of the fleet are as follows.

Car No.	Date built	Service entry date
KiHa 201	December 1961	January 1962
KiHa 202	December 1961	January 1962
KiHa 203	April 1963	
KiHa 204	April 1963	
KiHa 205	January 1964	April 1964
KiHa 206	January 1964	April 1964
KiHa 207	December 1970	
KiHa 208	December 1970	
KiHa 209	December 1970	
KiHa 210	December 1970	
KiHa 211	March 1975	
KiHa 212	March 1975	
KiHa 213	September 1977	October 1977
KiHa 214	September 1977	October 1977

== Fleet status ==
As of 1 April 2016, all 14 Kiha 200 series cars are in service, based at the line's Goi Depot. All cars except 209 and 210 are air-conditioned.

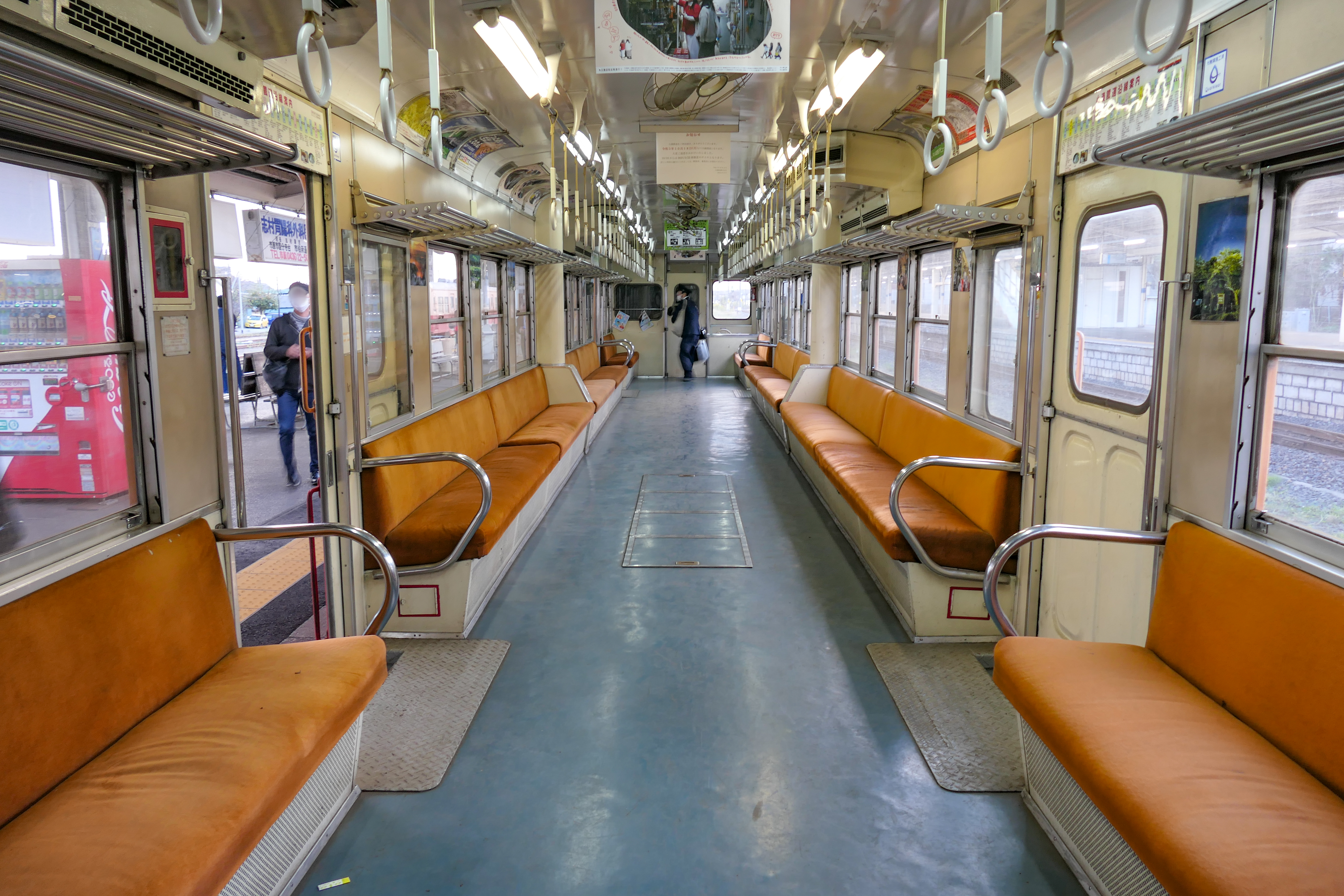
Interior

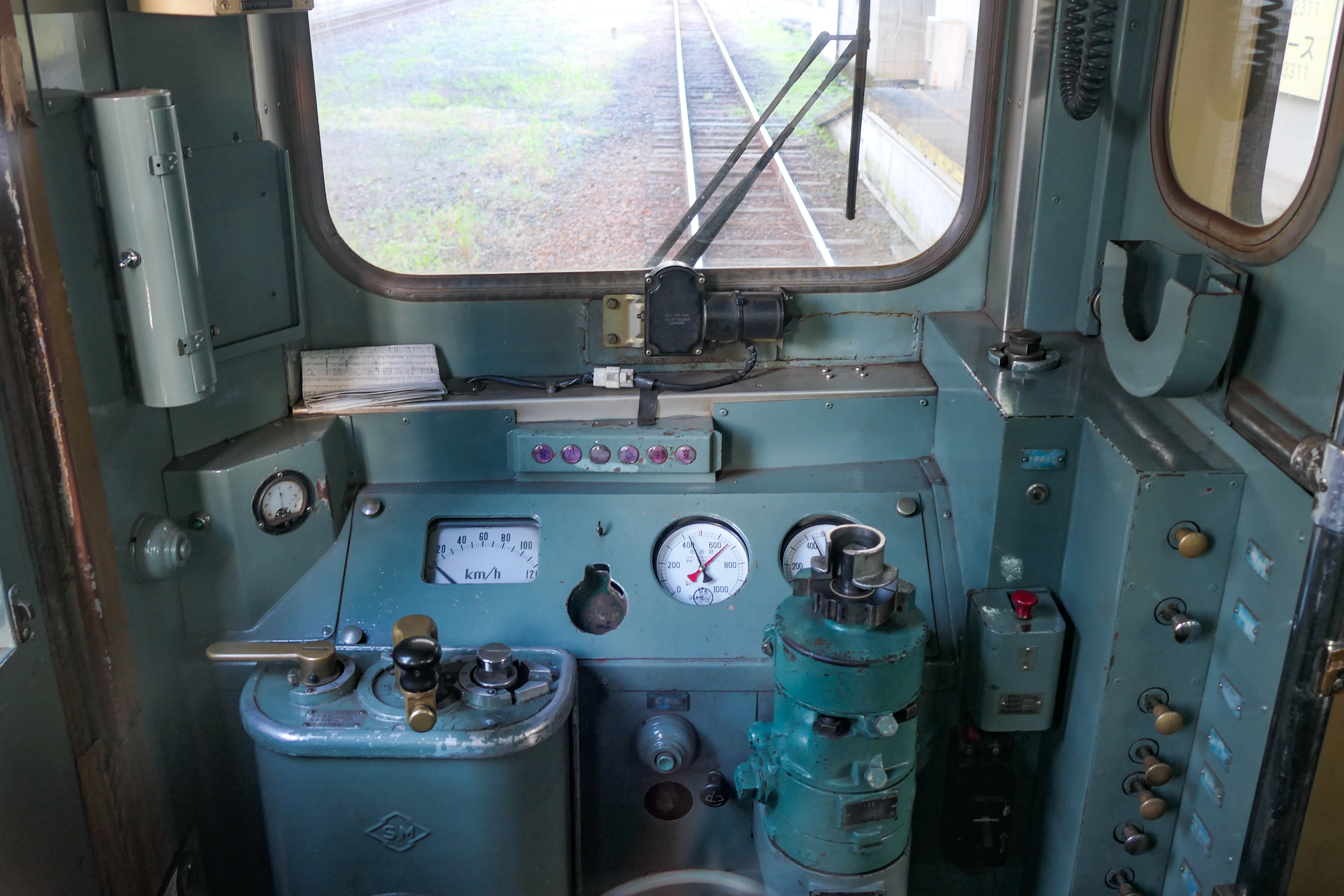
Driver's cab

Following news reports, the Kiha 200 series is to be replaced by the later Kiha 40 Model trains from Spring 2021 following renovations to the newer models joining the route. The earlier Kiha 200 series will be retired after some time with both models running the route.

== Popular culture ==
This train appears to have been used in various Gachimuchi songs on YouTube, most notably "Haru Yo Koi (Right Version)", amassing over 2.6 million views. This song has often been a part of Twitch.tv culture with many tributes held for the passing of the idol Billy Herrington.
