= Umatate Station =

Railway station in Ichihara, Chiba Prefecture, Japan

Umatate Station 馬立駅
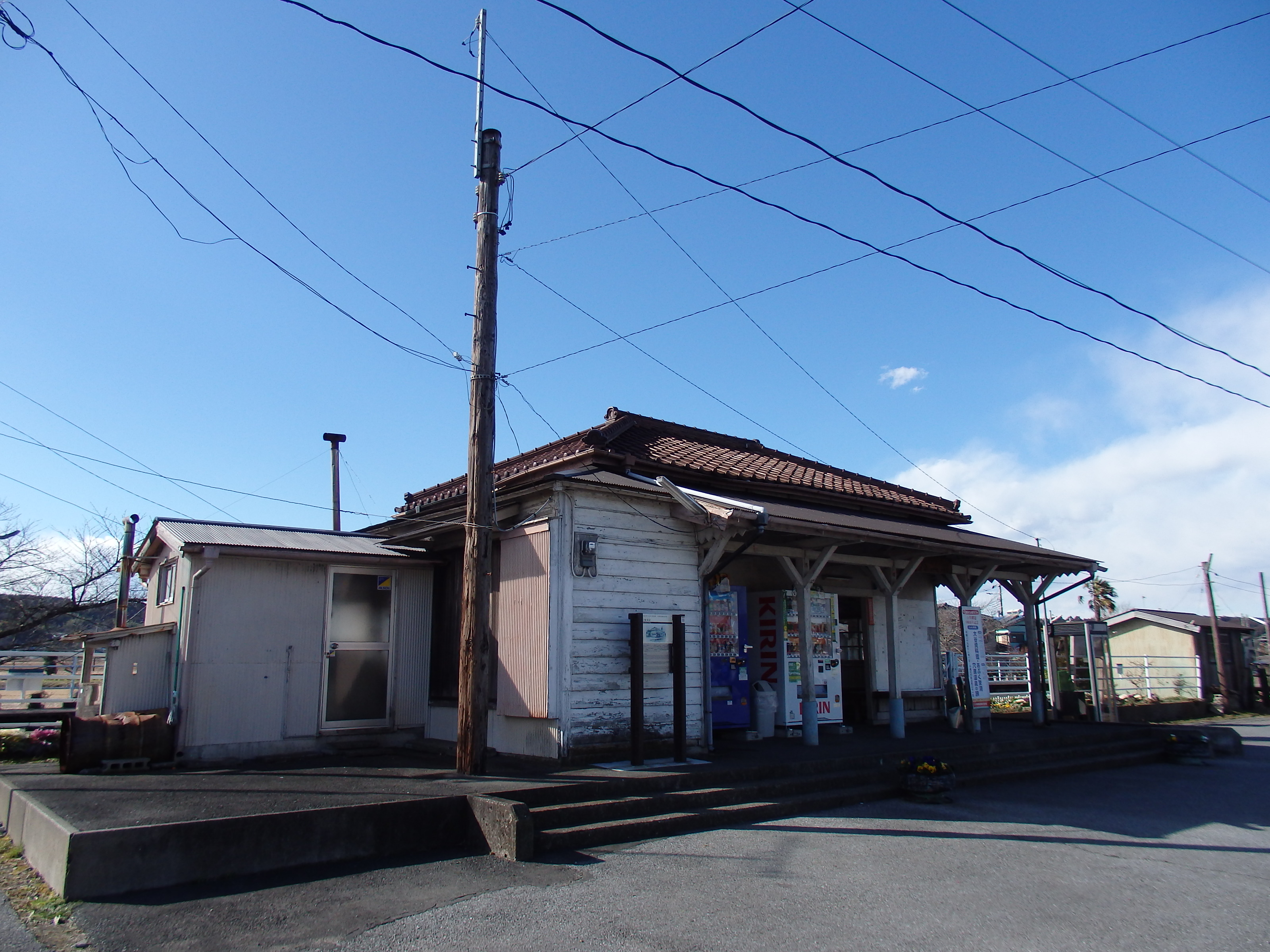
- The station in January 2018

General information
- Location: 790-2 Umatate, Ichihara-shi, Chiba-ken; Japan
- Coordinates: 35°25′25.28″N 140°06′53.46″E
- Operator: Kominato Railway
- Line: ■ Kominato Line
- Distance: 12.4 km from Goi
- Platforms: 2 side platforms
- Tracks: 2

History
- Opened: 7 March 1925

Services
Preceding station	Kominato Railway	Following station
Kōfūdai towards Goi	Kominato Line	Kazusa-Ushiku towards Kazusa-Nakano
Location
- Location within Chiba Prefecture Location within Japan

Umatate Station (馬立駅, Umatate-eki) is a railway station on the Kominato Line in Ichihara, Chiba, Japan, operated by the private railway operator Kominato Railway

== Lines ==
Umatate Station is served by the Kominato Line, and is 12.4 kilometers from the western terminus of the line at Goi Station.

== Station layout ==
Umatate Station has two opposed side platforms connected by a level crossing. The wooden station building dates from 1925, and is unattended.

=== Platforms ===
1	■ Kominato Line	for Goi
2	■ Kominato Line	for Kazusa-Ushiku and Kazusa-Nakano

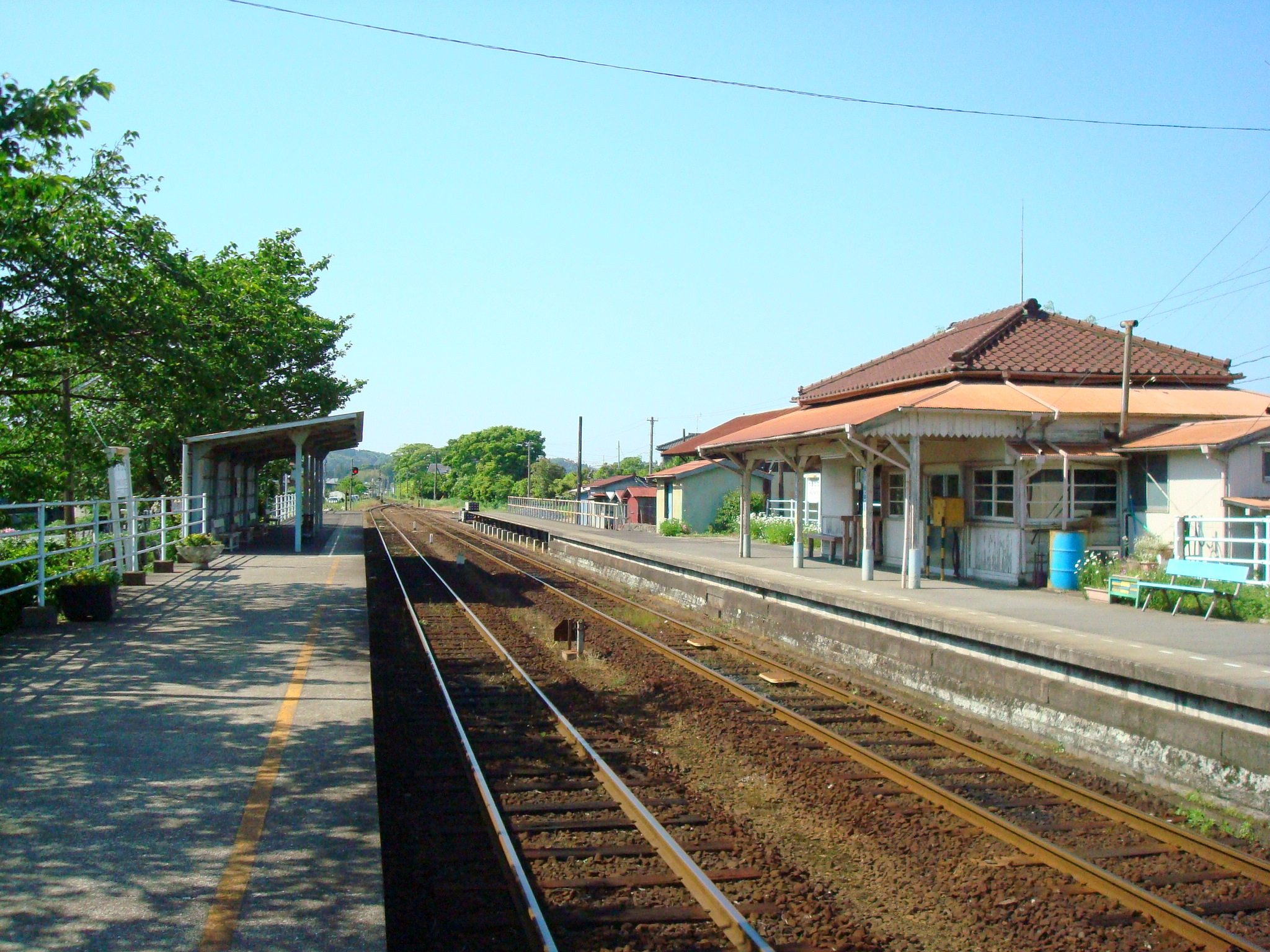
The platforms in May 2008

== History ==
Umatate Station was opened on March 7, 1925.

== See also ==
- List of railway stations in Japan
