= Yōrōkeikoku Station =

Railway station in Ichihara, Chiba Prefecture, Japan

Coordinates: 35°15′59.22″N 140°09′34.3″E

Yōrōkeikoku Station 養老渓谷駅
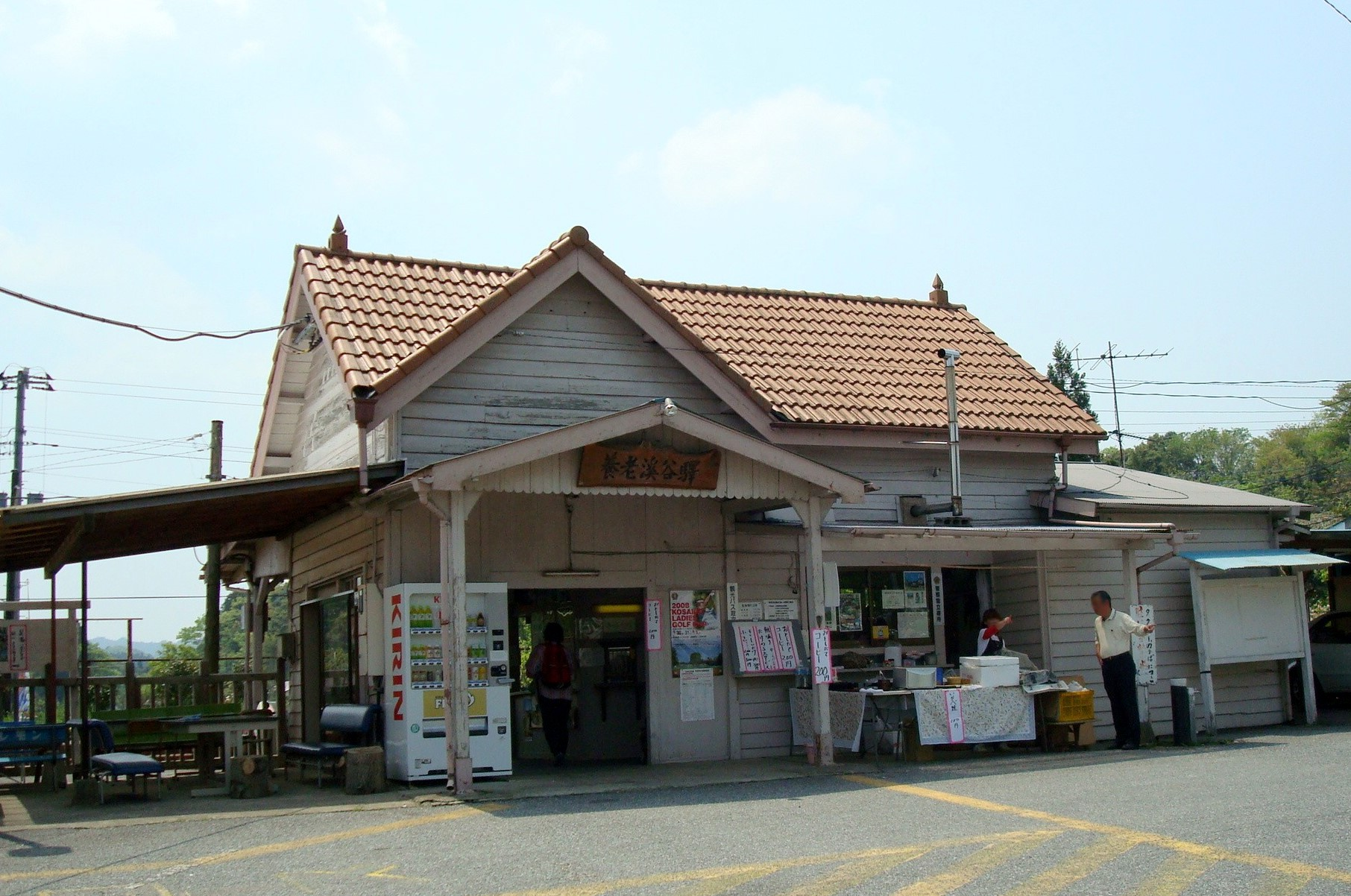

General information
- Location: Asobara 177, Ichihara, Chiba （千葉県市原市朝生原177） Japan
- Operator: Kominato Railroad Company
- Line: Kominato Line

History
- Opened: 1928
- Former names: Asōbara (until 1954)

Passengers
- 2008: 121 daily

Services
| Preceding station | Kominato Railway | Following station |
|---|---|---|
| Kazusa-Ōkubo towards Goi | Kominato Line | Kazusa-Nakano Terminus |
Location

Yōrōkeikoku Station (養老渓谷駅, Yōrōkeikoku-eki) is a railway station operated by the Kominato Railway Company's Kominato Line, located in Ichihara, Chiba Prefecture, Japan. It is 34.9 kilometers from the western terminus of the Kominato Line at Goi Station.

== History ==
Yōrōkeikoku Station was opened on May 16, 1928 as Asōbara Station (朝生原駅, Asōbara-eki). It was renamed to its present name in December 1954.

== Lines ==
- Kominato Railway Company
  - Kominato Line

== Station layout ==
Yōrōkeikoku Station has a single island platform and a side platform; however, at present only the side platform is in use, serving bidirectional traffic. The station is one of the few on the Kominato line which is staffed.

=== Platforms ===
| 1 | ■ Kominato Line | Goi; Kazusa-Ushiku, Kazusa-Nakano |
