= Kazusa-Mitsumata Station =

Railway station in Ichihara, Chiba Prefecture, Japan

Kazusa-Mitsumata Station 上総三又駅
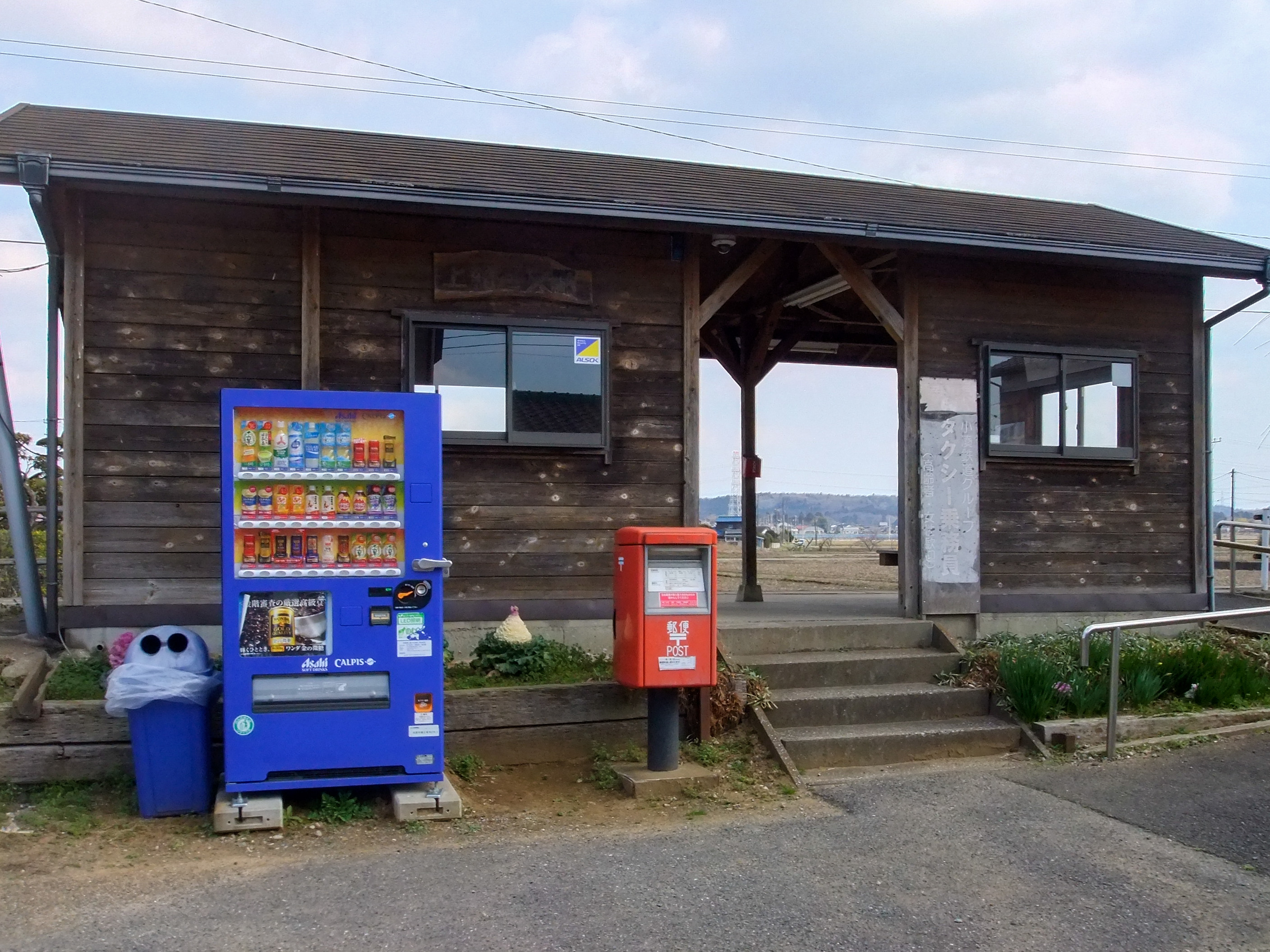
- Kazusa-Mitsumata Station in March 2017

General information
- Location: 276-1 Amaariki, Ichihara-shi, Chiba-ken; Japan
- Coordinates: 35°27′57.89″N 140°07′36.15″E
- Operator: Kominato Railway
- Line: Kominato Line
- Distance: 7.2 km from Goi
- Platforms: 1 side platform
- Tracks: 1

Other information
- Status: Unstaffed
- Website: Official website

History
- Opened: 20 November 1932
- Rebuilt: 2001

Passengers
- FY2010: 143 daily

Services
Preceding station	Kominato Railway	Following station
Amaariki towards Goi	Kominato Line	Kazusa-Yamada towards Kazusa-Nakano
Location
- Location within Chiba Prefecture Location within Japan

Kazusa-Mitsumata Station (上総三又駅, Kazusa-Mitsumata-eki) is a railway station on the Kominato Line in Ichihara, Chiba Prefecture, Japan, operated by the private railway operator Kominato Railway.

== Lines ==
Kazusa-Mitsumata Station is served by the Kominato Line, and lies 7.2 km from the western terminus of the line at Goi Station.

== Station layout ==
Kazusa-Mitsumata Station has one side platform serving a single bidirectional line.

== History ==
Kazusa-Mitsumata Station was opened on November 20, 1932. The original station building burned down in February 2001 and was replaced with a wooden structure. The station has been unattended since 1956.

== Passenger statistics ==
In fiscal 2010, the station was used by an average of 143 passengers daily (boarding passengers only).

== See also ==
- List of railway stations in Japan
