= Kazusa-Kawama Station =

Railway station in Ichihara, Chiba Prefecture, Japan

Coordinates: 35°23′17.16″N 140°09′04.03″E

Kazusa-Kawama Station 上総川間駅
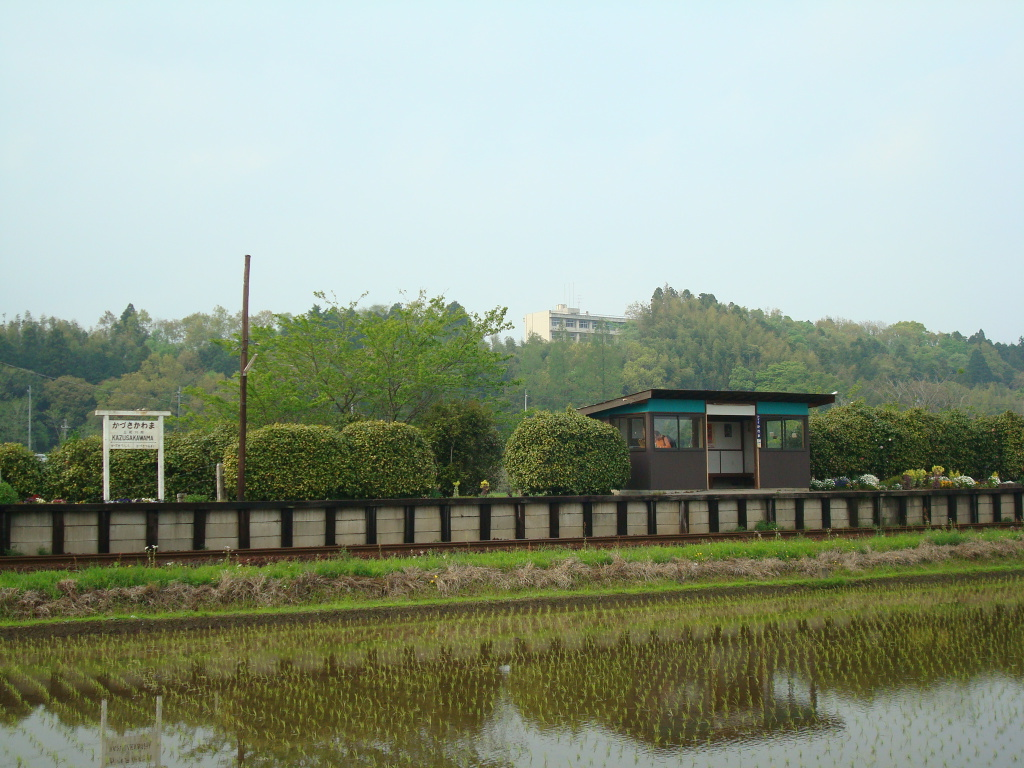

General information
- Location: Shimoyata 547-4, Ichihara, Chiba （千葉県市原市下矢田547-4） Japan
- Operator: Kominato Railroad Company
- Line: Kominato Line

History
- Opened: 1953

Passengers
- 2008: 8 daily

Services
Preceding station	Kominato Railway	Following station
Kazusa-Ushiku towards Goi	Kominato Line	Kazusa-Tsurumai towards Kazusa-Nakano
Location

Kazusa-Kawama Station (上総川間駅, Kazusa-Kawama-eki) is a railway station operated by the Kominato Railway Company's Kominato Line, located in Ichihara, Chiba Prefecture, Japan. It is 18.5 kilometers from the western terminus of the Kominato Line at Goi Station.

== History ==
Kazusa-Kawama Station was opened on April 1, 1953.

== Lines ==
- Kominato Railway Company
  - Kominato Line

== Station layout ==
Kazusa-Kawama Station has a single side platform serving bidirectional traffic. There is a small rain shelter built on the platform, but no station building. The station is unattended.

=== Platforms ===
1	■ Kominato Line	Kazusa-Ushiku, Goi; Kazusa-Nakano
