= Kōfūdai Station (Chiba) =

Railway station in Ichihara, Chiba Prefecture, Japan

Coordinates: 35°26′25.15″N 140°06′51.21″E

Kōfūdai Station 光風台駅
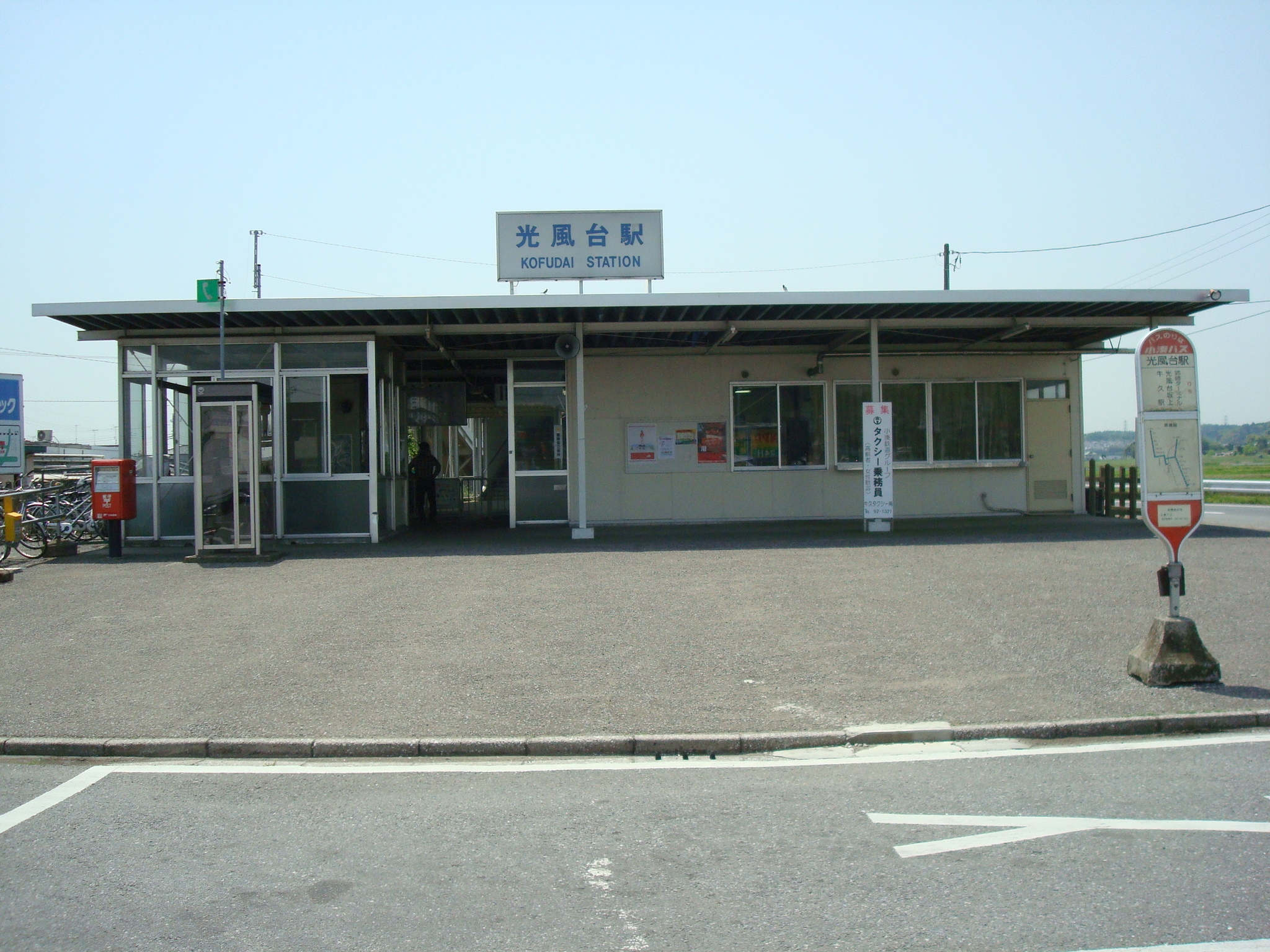

General information
- Location: Nakatakane 846, Ichihara, Chiba （千葉県市原市中高根846） Japan
- Operator: Kominato Railroad Company
- Line: Kominato Line

History
- Opened: 1976

Passengers
- 2008: 493 daily

Services
Preceding station	Kominato Railway	Following station
Kazusa-Yamada towards Goi	Kominato Line	Umatate towards Kazusa-Nakano
Location

Kōfūdai Station (光風台駅, Kōfūdai-eki) is a railway station operated by the Kominato Railway Company's Kominato Line, located in Ichihara, Chiba Prefecture, Japan. It is 10.6 kilometers from the western terminus of the Kominato Line at Goi Station.

== History ==
Kōfūdai Station was opened on December 23, 1976, to serve a new suburban housing development.

== Lines ==
- Kominato Railway Company
  - Kominato Line

== Station layout ==
Kōfūdai Station has a single island side platform connected to the station building by an overpass.

=== Platforms ===
1	■ Kominato Line	Goi
2	■ Kominato Line	Kazusa-Ushiku, Kazusa-Nakano
