= Kazusa-Ushiku Station =

Railway station in Ichihara, Chiba Prefecture, Japan

Coordinates: 35°24′0.50″N 140°08′32.07″E

Kazusa-Ushiku Station 上総牛久駅
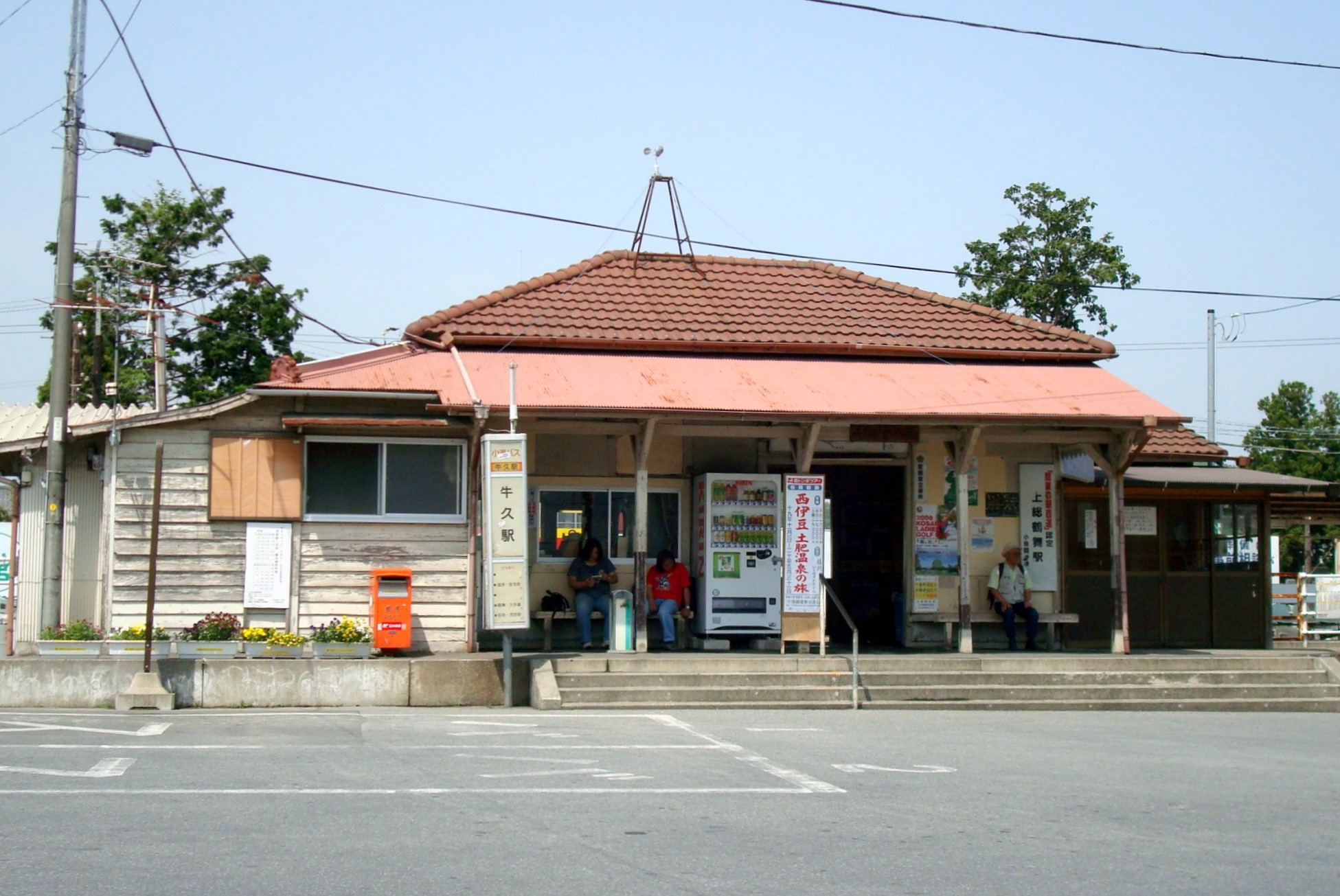

General information
- Location: Ushiku 897-2, Ichihara, Chiba （千葉県市原市牛久897-2） Japan
- Operator: Kominato Railroad Company
- Line: Kominato Line

History
- Opened: 1925

Passengers
- 2008: 750 daily

Services
Preceding station	Kominato Railway	Following station
Umatate towards Goi	Kominato Line	Kazusa-Kawama towards Kazusa-Nakano
Location

Kazusa-Ushiku Station (上総牛久駅, Kazusa-Ushiku-eki) is a railway station operated by the Kominato Railway Company's Kominato Line, located in Ichihara, Chiba Prefecture, Japan. It is 16.4 kilometers from the western terminus of the Kominato Line at Goi Station.

== History ==
Kazusa-Ushiku Station was opened on March 7, 1925.

== Lines ==
- Kominato Railway Company
  - Kominato Line

== Station layout ==
Kazusa-Ushiku Station has a side platform and an island platform serving three tracks. The platforms are connected by a level crossing. The wooden station building dates from the 1925 construction, and is one of the few stations on the Kominato line which is permanently attended.

=== Platforms ===
■ Kominato Line	Kōfūdai,Goi
■ Kominato Line	Yōrōkeikoku, Kazusa-Nakano
■ Kominato Line	Kōfūdai,Goi
