= Tawarada Station =

Railway station in Kimitsu, Chiba Prefecture, Japan

Tawarada Station 俵田駅
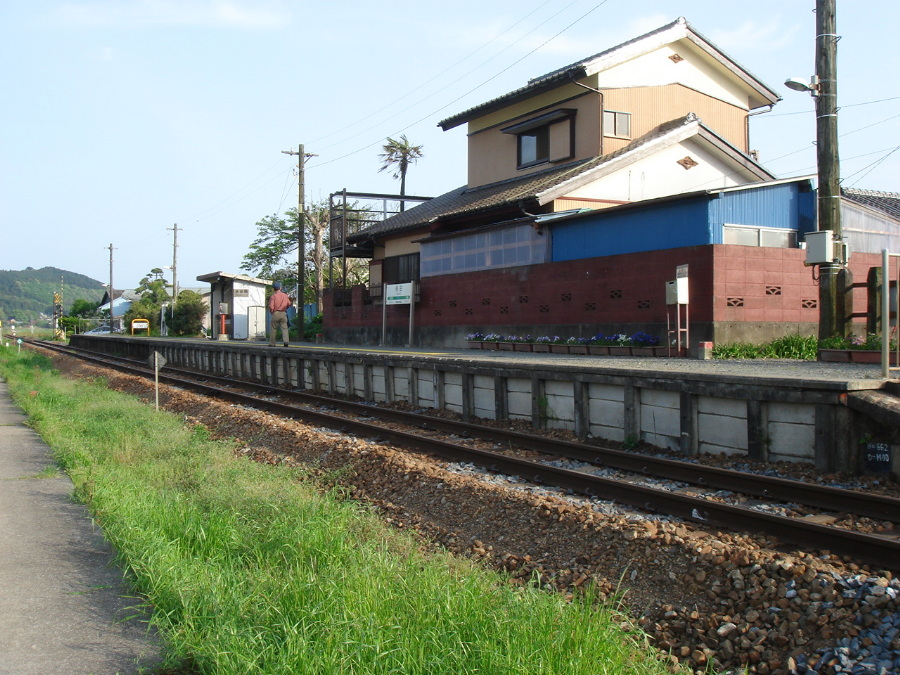
- Tawarada Station

General information
- Location: Tawarada 1630, Kimitsu-shi, Chiba-ken 292-0455; Japan
- Coordinates: 35°18′53.01″N 140°3′40.24″E
- Operator: JR East
- Line: ■ Kururi Line
- Distance: 21.0 km from Kisarazu
- Platforms: 1 side platform

Other information
- Status: Unstaffed
- Website: Official website

History
- Opened: July 10, 1921

Passengers
- FY2006: 64 daily

Services
Preceding station	JR East	Following station
Obitsu towards Kisarazu	Kururi Line	Kururi towards Kazusa-Kameyama
Location
- Location within Chiba Prefecture Location within Japan

Tawarada Station (俵田駅, Tawarada-eki) is a passenger railway station in the city of Kimitsu, Chiba Prefecture, Japan, operated by the East Japan Railway Company (JR East).

== Lines ==
Tawarada Station is a station on the Kururi Line, and is located 21.0 km from the terminus of the line at Kisarazu Station.

== Station layout ==
The station consists of a single side platform serving bidirectional traffic. The platform is short, and can only handle trains with a length of three carriages or less. The station is unattended.

=== Platform ===
1	■ Kururi Line	For Kisarazu; Kazusa-Kameyama

== History ==
Tawarada Station was opened on July 10, 1921 as a station on the Chiba Prefectural Railways Kururi Line. The line was nationalized into the Japanese Government Railways (JGR) on September 1, 1923. The JGR became the Japan National Railways (JNR) after World War II. The station was absorbed into the JR East network upon the privatization of the JNR on April 1, 1987. The original station building was destroyed in a fire on January 3, 2008, and a new structure was completed in 2009.

== Passenger statistics ==
In fiscal 2006, the station was used by an average of 64 passengers daily.

== Surrounding area ==
- National Route 410
- Obitsu River

== See also ==
- List of railway stations in Japan
