= Hirayama Station =

Railway station in Kimitsu, Chiba Prefecture, Japan

Hirayama Station 平山駅
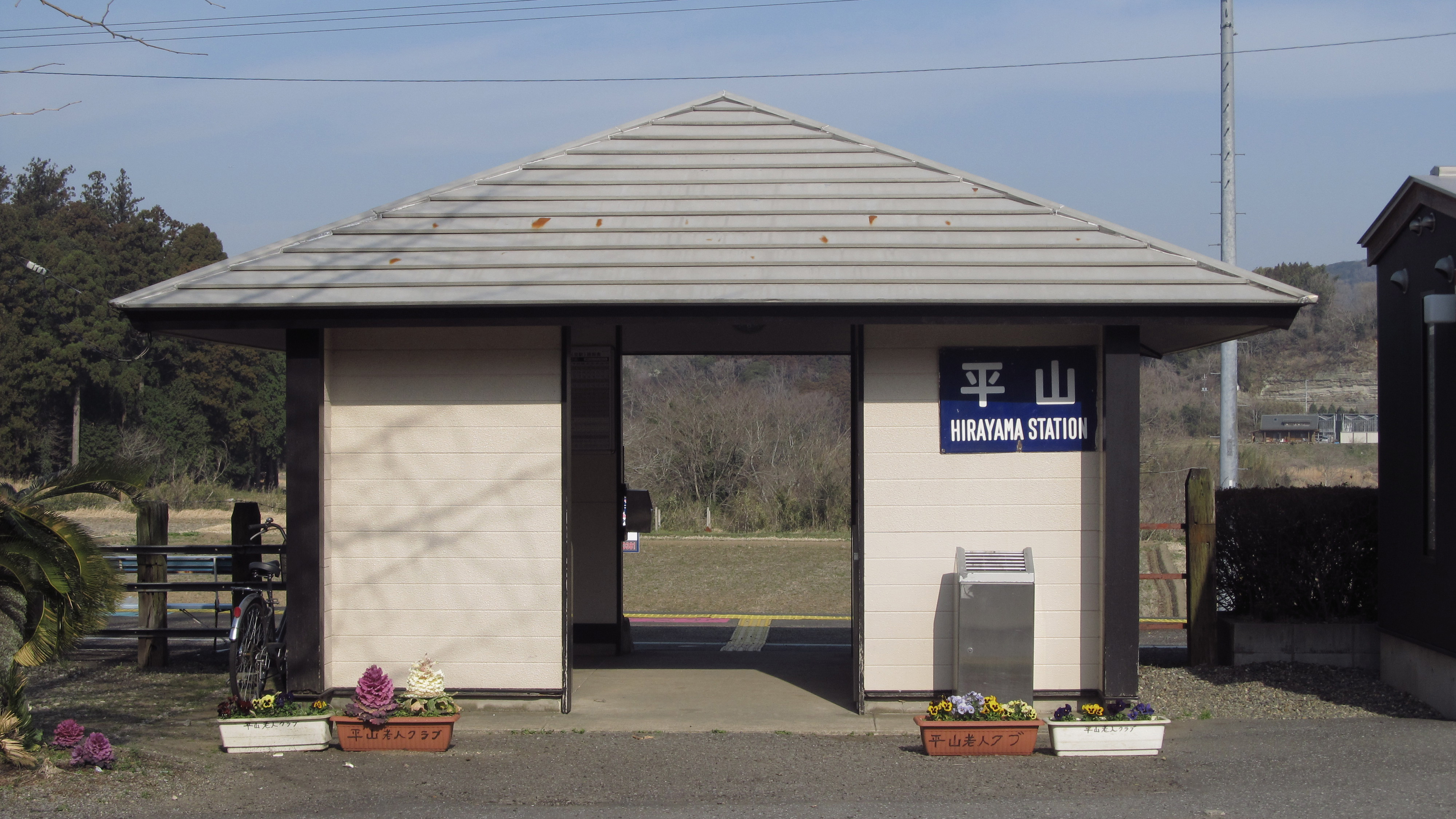
- Hirayama Station in March 2014

General information
- Location: Hirayama 759, Kimitsu-shi, Chiba-ken 292-0502; Japan
- Coordinates: 35°16′27.62″N 140°3′53.51″E
- Operator: JR East
- Line: ■ Kururi Line
- Distance: 25.7 km from Kisarazu
- Platforms: 1 side platform

Other information
- Status: Unstaffed
- Website: Official website

History
- Opened: March 25, 1936

Passengers
- FY2006: 48 daily

Services
Preceding station	JR East	Following station
Kururi towards Kisarazu	Kururi Line	Kazusa-Matsuoka towards Kazusa-Kameyama
Location
- Location within Chiba Prefecture Location within Japan

Hirayama Station (平山駅, Hirayama-eki)is a passenger railway station in the city of Kimitsu, Chiba Prefecture, Japan, operated by the East Japan Railway Company (JR East).

== Lines ==
Hirayama Station is a station on the Kururi Line, and is located 25.7 km from the terminus of the line at Kisarazu Station.

== Station layout ==
The station consists of a single side platform serving bidirectional traffic. The platform is short, and can only handle trains with a length of three carriages or less. The station is unattended.

=== Platform ===
1	■ Kururi Line	For Kisarazu, Kururi; Kazusa-Kameyama

== History ==
Hirayama Station was opened on March 25, 1936. It was closed from December 16, 1944 to April 1, 1947. The station was absorbed into the JR East network upon the privatization of the JNR on April 1, 1987.

== Passenger statistics ==
In fiscal 2006, the station was used by an average of 48 passengers daily.

== Surrounding area ==
- National Route 410
- Obitsu River

== See also ==
- List of railway stations in Japan
