= Kururi Station =

Railway station in Kimitsu, Chiba Prefecture, Japan

Kururi Station 久留里駅
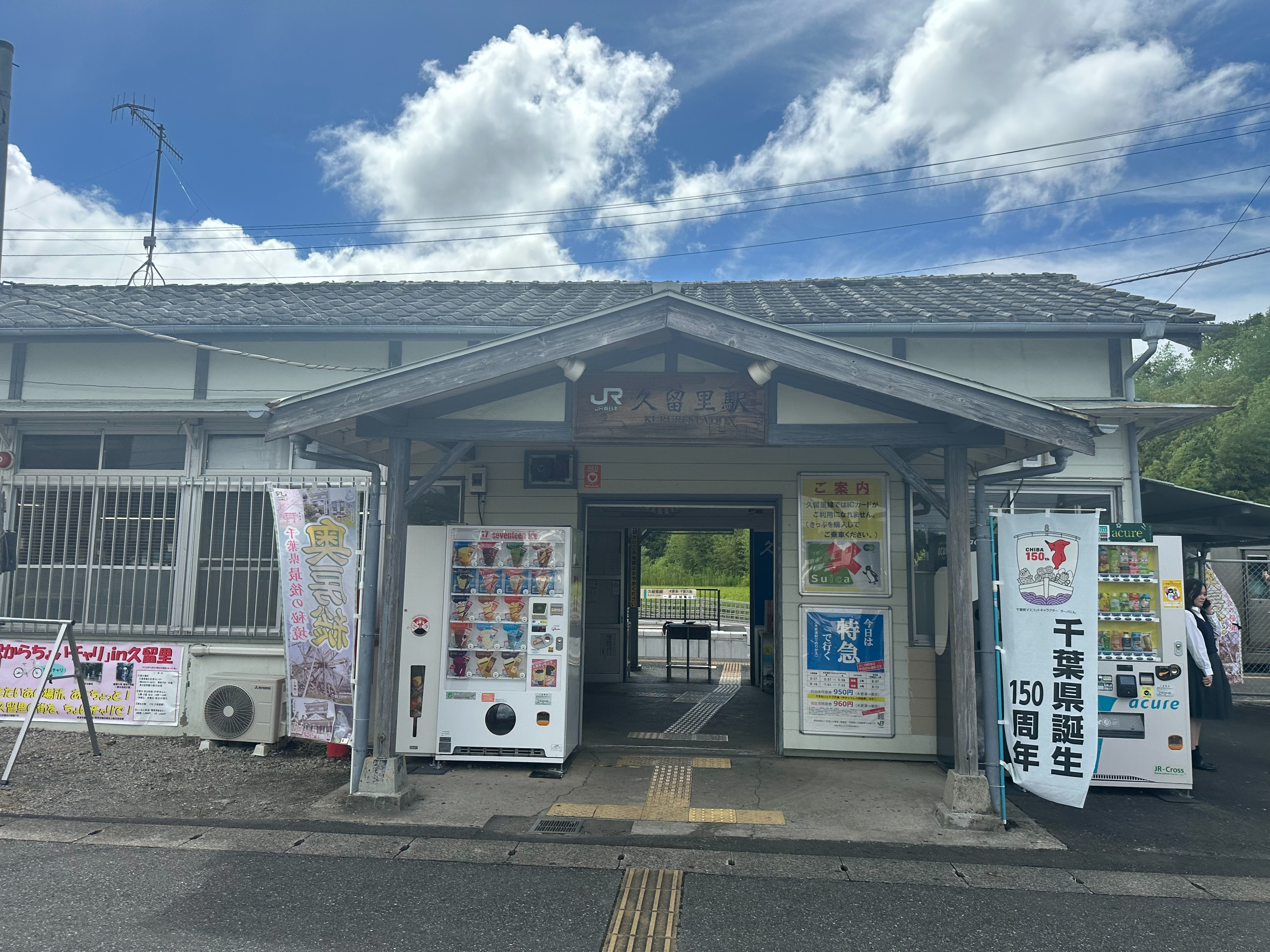
- Kururi Station, 2023

General information
- Location: Kururi-Ichiba 198, Kimitsu, Chiba （千葉県君津市久留里市場198） Japan
- Coordinates: 35°17′44.91″N 140°4′32.67″E
- Operator: JR East
- Line: ■ Kururi Line
- Distance: 23.6 km from Kisarazu
- Platforms: 1 island + 1 side platform

Other information
- Status: Staffed
- Website: Official website

History
- Opened: December 28, 1912

Passengers
- FY2019: 365 daily

Services
Preceding station	JR East	Following station
Tawarada towards Kisarazu	Kururi Line	Hirayama towards Kazusa-Kameyama
Location
- Location within Chiba Prefecture Location within Japan

Kururi Station (久留里駅, Kururi-eki) is a railway station s a passenger railway station in the city of Kimitsu, Chiba Prefecture, Japan, operated by the East Japan Railway Company (JR East).

== Lines ==
Kururi Station is a station on the Kururi Line, and is located 23.6 km from the terminus of the line at Kisarazu Station.

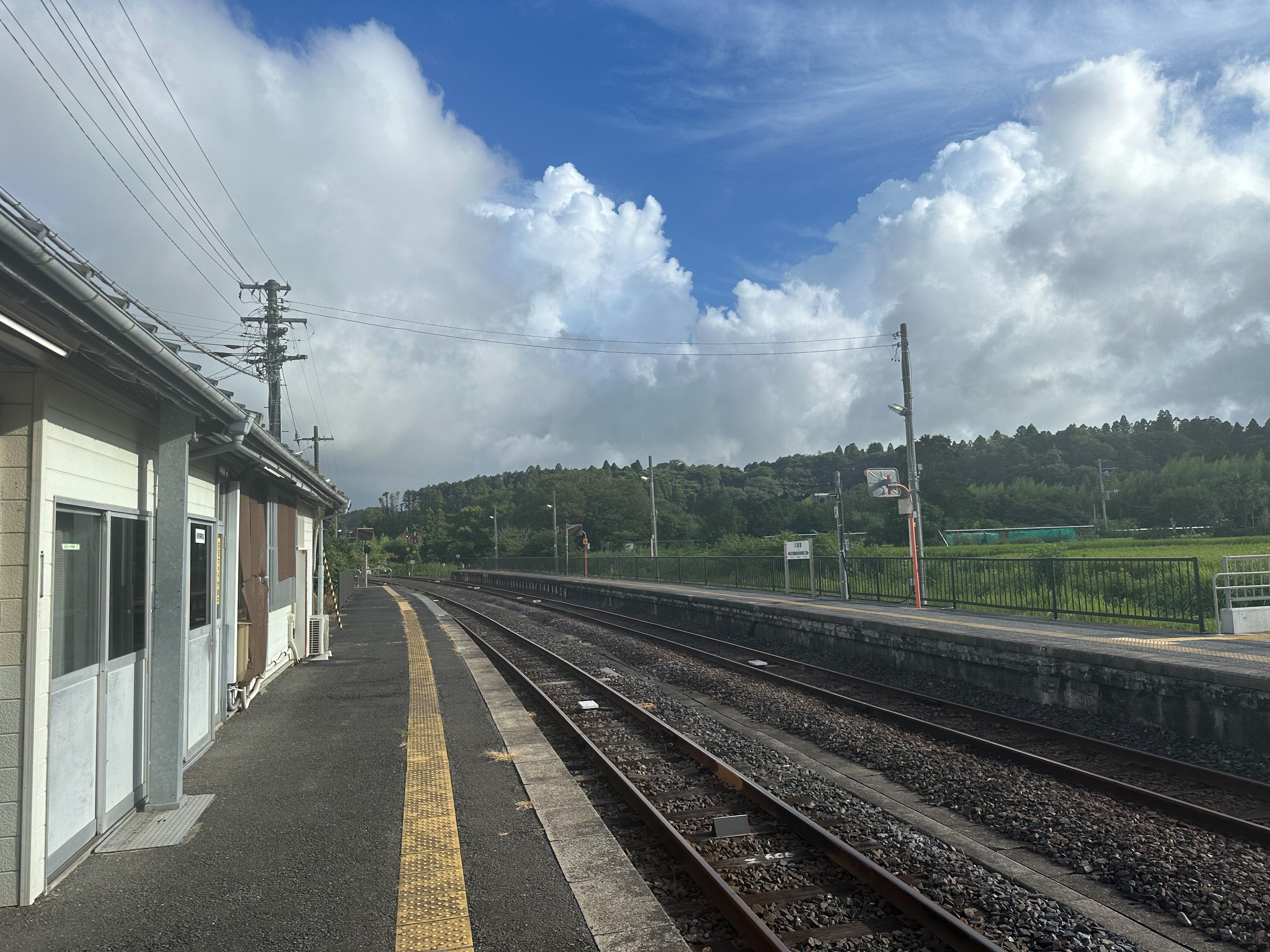
Station platforms, 2023

== Station layout ==
Kururi Station has an island platform and a side platform serving three tracks. The station building is old, and dates from the original opening of the Kururi Line in 1912. It is one of the few fully staffed stations on the line. This is one of only 2 stations on the line where there is more than 1 track. The other station is Yokota Station.

=== Platform ===
1,2	■ Kururi Line	For Kisarazu or Kazusa-Kameyama
3	■ Kururi Line	For Kisarazu

== Buses ==
=== Stage carriage bus ===
There is a casual route bus which runs in October and November. This bus is called Satoyama GO Bus. The bus is bound for Kazusa-Nakano Station and stops at Yōrōkeikoku Station and so on.

=== Highway Bus ===
No	Via	Destination	Company	Note
Aqusea	Kisarazu・Kaneda Bus Terminal (Iwane Station: It takes from the Bus Terminal to the station about 40 minutes on foot)	Tokyo Station	Keisei Bus	
Kamogawa・Shibuya Line	Non stop	Shibuya Station	Tōkyū Bus	
Kapīna	Kazusa-Kameyama Station・Awa-Kamogawa Station	Kameda Hospital	Nittō Kotsu	
Kapīna	Makuta Station・Soga Station	Chiba Station	Nittō Kotsu	

- There are buses which go to Haneda Airport from Kisarazu・Kaneda Bus Terminal. If you ride on Aqusea, you available on the buses for Haneda Airport .
- Highway bus Aqusea runs on Tokyo Bay Aqua Line.

== History ==
Kururi Station was opened on December 28, 1912 as the original eastern terminal station for the Chiba Prefectural Railways Kururi Line. The line was nationalized into the Japanese Government Railways (JGR) on September 1, 1923. The line was extended to Kazusa-Kameyama on March 25, 1936. The JGR became the Japan National Railways (JNR) after World War II. The station was absorbed into the JR East network upon the privatization of the JNR on April 1, 1987.

== Passenger statistics ==
In fiscal 2019, the station was used by an average of 365 passengers (boarding passengers only).

== Surrounding area ==
- National Route 410
- Kururi Castle

== See also ==
- List of railway stations in Japan
