= Obitsu Station =

Railway station in Kimitsu, Chiba Prefecture, Japan

Obitsu Station 小櫃駅
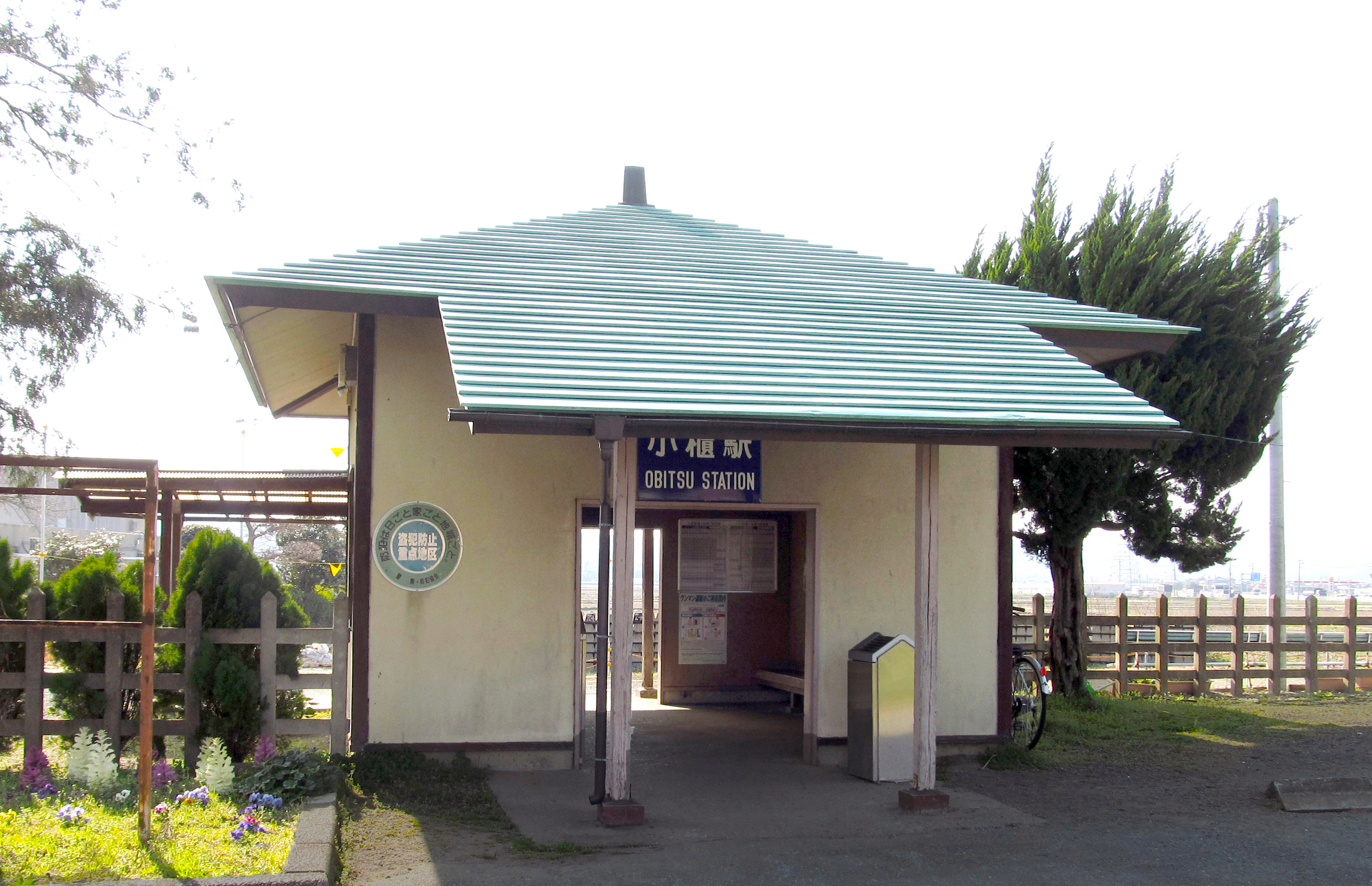
- Obitsu Station in March 2014

General information
- Location: Sueyoshi 152, Kimitsu-shi, Chiba-ken 292-0451; Japan
- Coordinates: 35°19′42.15″N 140°3′35.63″E
- Operator: JR East
- Line: ■ Kururi Line
- Distance: 18.2 km from Kisarazu
- Platforms: 1 side platform

Other information
- Status: Unstaffed
- Website: Official website

History
- Opened: December 28, 1912

Passengers
- FY2006: 154 daily

Services
Preceding station	JR East	Following station
Shimogōri towards Kisarazu	Kururi Line	Tawarada towards Kazusa-Kameyama
Location
- Location within Chiba Prefecture Location within Japan

Obitsu Station (小櫃駅, Obitsu-eki) is a passenger railway station in the city of Kimitsu, Chiba Prefecture, Japan, operated by the East Japan Railway Company (JR East).

== Lines ==
Obitsu Station is a station on the Kururi Line, and is located 18.2 km from the terminus of the line at Kisarazu Station.

== Station layout ==
The station consists of a single side platform serving bidirectional traffic. The station formerly had dual opposed side platforms, but one platform is no longer in use, although its overgrown ruins can still be seen to one side of the station. The platform is short, and can only handle trains with a length of four carriages or less. The station is unattended.

=== Platform ===
1	■ Kururi Line	For Kisarazu; Kazusa-Kameyama

== History ==
Obitsu Station was opened on December 28, 1912 as a station on the Chiba Prefectural Railways Kururi Line. The line was nationalized into the Japanese Government Railways (JGR) on September 1, 1923. The JGR became the Japan National Railways (JNR) after World War II. The station was absorbed into the JR East network upon the privatization of the JNR on April 1, 1987.

== Passenger statistics ==
In fiscal 2006, the station was used by an average of 154 passengers daily.

== Surrounding area ==
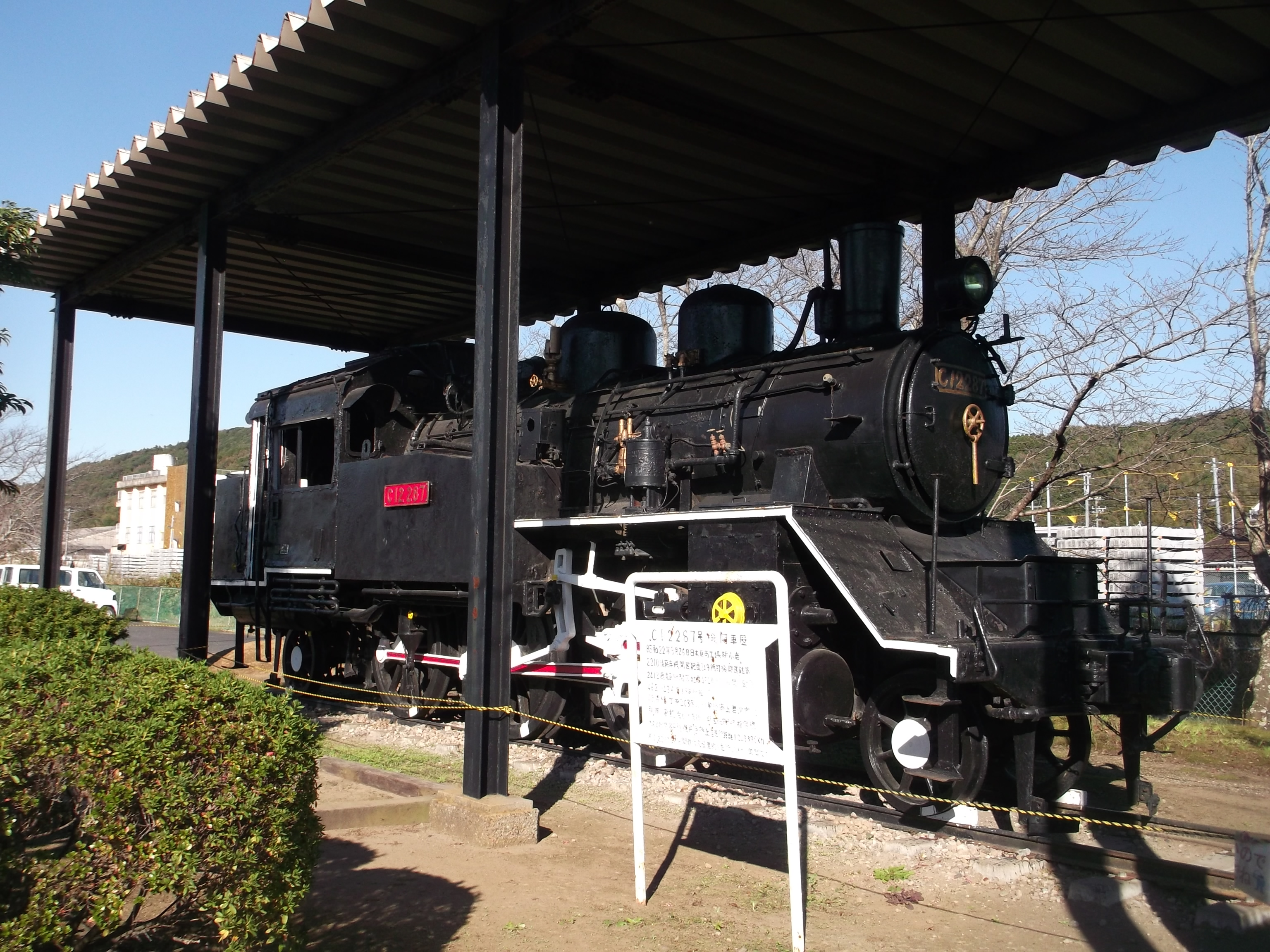
JNR Class C12 at Obitsu Public Hall

- National Route 410
- Obitsu Middle School
- Obitsu Elementary School
- Obitsu Public Hall

== See also ==
- List of railway stations in Japan
