= Kazusa-Matsuoka Station =

Railway station in Kimitsu, Chiba Prefecture, Japan

Kazusa-Matsuoka Station 上総松丘駅
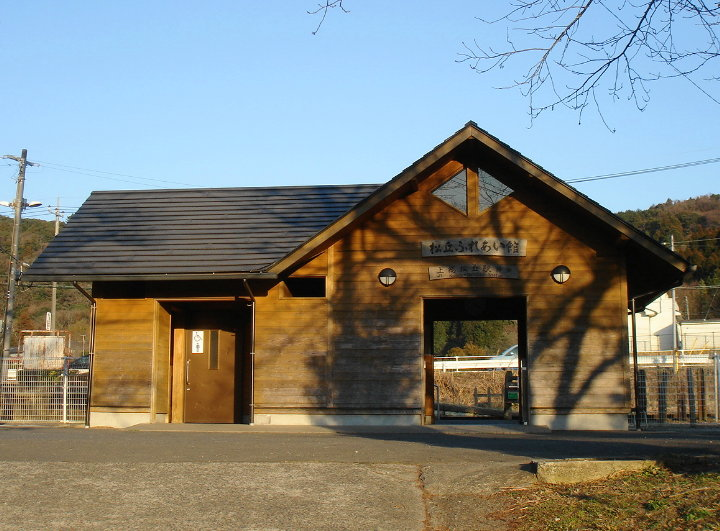
- Kazusa-Matsuoka Station

General information
- Location: Hiraoka 1692, Kimitsu-shi, Chiba-ken 292-0503; Japan
- Coordinates: 35°15′28.24″N 140°3′50.42″E
- Operator: JR East
- Line: ■ Kururi Line
- Distance: 28.3 km from Kisarazu
- Platforms: 1 island platform

Other information
- Status: Unstaffed
- Website: Official website

History
- Opened: March 25, 1936

Passengers
- FY2006: 81 daily

Services
Preceding station	JR East	Following station
Hirayama towards Kisarazu	Kururi Line	Kazusa-Kameyama Terminus
Location
- Location within Chiba Prefecture Location within Japan

Kazusa-Matsuoka Station (上総松丘駅, Kazusa-Matsuoka-eki) is a passenger railway station in the city of Kimitsu, Chiba Prefecture, Japan, operated by the East Japan Railway Company (JR East).

== Lines ==
Kazusa-Matsuoka Station is a station on the Kururi Line, and is located 28.3 km from the terminus of the line at Kisarazu Station.

== Station layout ==
The station consists of a single side platform serving bidirectional traffic. The station formerly also had an island platform, the overgrown ruins of which can still be seen to one side of the existing side platform. The platform is short, and can only handle trains with a length of three carriages or less. The station is unattended.

=== Platform ===
1	■ Kururi Line	For Kisarazu, Kururi; Kazusa-Kameyama

== History ==
Kazusa-Matsuoka Station was opened on March 25, 1936. It was closed from December 16, 1944 to April 1, 1947. The station was absorbed into the JR East network upon the privatization of the JNR on April 1, 1987.

== Passenger statistics ==
In fiscal 2006, the station was used by an average of 81 passengers daily.

== Surrounding area ==
- National Route 410
- National Route 465
- Senbon Castle ruins

== See also ==
- List of railway stations in Japan
