= Higashi-Yokota Station =

Railway station in Sodegaura, Chiba Prefecture, Japan

Higashi-Yokota Station 東横田駅
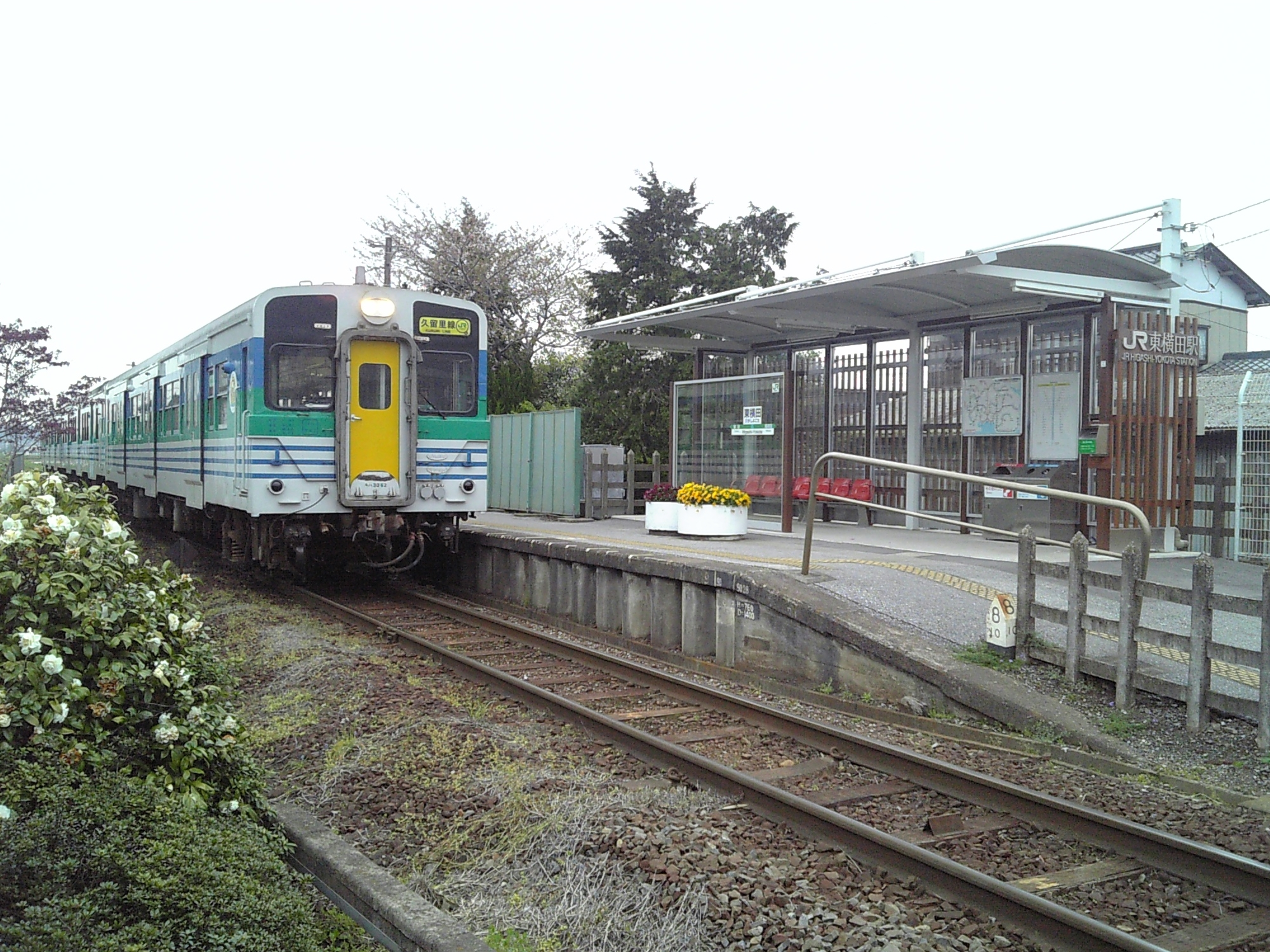
- Higashi-Yokota Station

General information
- Location: Yokota 442, Sodegaura-shi, Chiba-ken 299-0236; Japan
- Coordinates: 35°23′10.51″N 140°2′11.33″E
- Operator: JR East
- Line: ■ Kururi Line
- Distance: 10.8 km from Kisarazu
- Platforms: 1 side platform

Other information
- Status: Unstaffed
- Website: Official website

History
- Opened: April 20, 1937

Passengers
- FY2006: 156

Services
Preceding station	JR East	Following station
Yokota towards Kisarazu	Kururi Line	Makuta towards Kazusa-Kameyama
Location
- Location within Chiba Prefecture Location within Japan

Higashi-Yokota Station (東横田駅, Higashi-Yokota-eki) is a passenger railway station in the city of Sodegaura, Chiba Prefecture, Japan, operated by the East Japan Railway Company (JR East).

== Lines ==
Higashi-Yokota Station is served by the Kururi Line, and is located 10.8 km from the western terminus of the line at Kisarazu Station.

== Station layout ==
The station consists of a single side platform serving bidirectional traffic. The platform is short, and can only handle trains with a length of four carriages or less. The station is unattended.

== History ==
Higashi-Yokota Station was opened on April 20, 1937. The station was closed on January 20, 1947, but was reopened on April 1, 1958. The station was absorbed into the JR East network upon the privatization of the JNR on April 1, 1987. A new station building was completed in January 2007.

== Passenger statistics ==
In fiscal 2006, the station was used by an average of 156 passengers daily (boarding passengers only).

== Surrounding area ==
- National Route 165
- National Route 409
- former Hirakawa Town Hall

== See also ==
- List of railway stations in Japan
