= Shimogōri Station =

Railway station in Kimitsu, Chiba Prefecture, Japan

Shimogōri Station 下郡駅
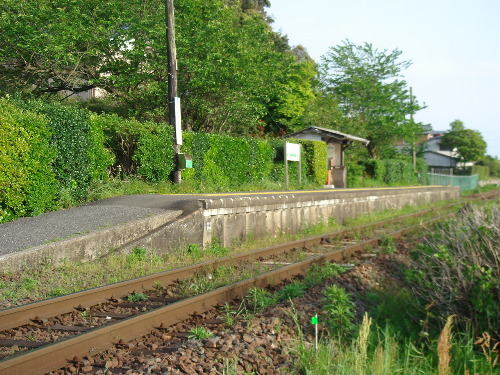
- Shimogōri Station

General information
- Location: Yamamoto Yumeishita 2, Kimitsu-shi, Chiba-ken 292-0401; Japan
- Coordinates: 35°21′19.34″N 140°3′19.57″E
- Operator: JR East
- Line: ■ Kururi Line
- Distance: 15.2 km from Kisarazu
- Platforms: 1 side platform

Other information
- Status: Unstaffed
- Website: Official website

History
- Opened: April 20, 1937

Passengers
- FY2006: 78 daily

Services
Preceding station	JR East	Following station
Makuta towards Kisarazu	Kururi Line	Obitsu towards Kazusa-Kameyama
Location
- Location within Chiba Prefecture Location within Japan

Shimogōri Station (下郡駅, Shimogōri-eki) is a passenger railway station in the city of Kimitsu, Chiba Prefecture, Japan, operated by the East Japan Railway Company (JR East).

== Lines ==
Shimogōri Station is a station on the Kururi Line, and is located 15.2 km from the terminus of the line at Kisarazu Station.

== Station layout ==
The station consists of a single side platform serving bidirectional traffic. The platform is short, and can only handle trains with a length of three carriages or less. The station is unattended.

=== Platform ===
1	■ Kururi Line	For Kisarazu; Kazusa-Kameyama

== History ==
Shimogōri Station was opened on April 20, 1937. It was closed in 1944 due to World War II, but reopened in January 1947, but as utilization was very low, it closed again until April 1, 1956. The station was absorbed into the JR East network upon the privatization of the JNR on April 1, 1987.

== Passenger statistics ==
In fiscal 2006, the station was used by an average of 78 passengers daily.

== Surrounding area ==
- National Route 410

== See also ==
- List of railway stations in Japan
