= Makuta Station =

Railway station in Kisarazu, Chiba Prefecture, Japan

Makuta Station 馬来田駅
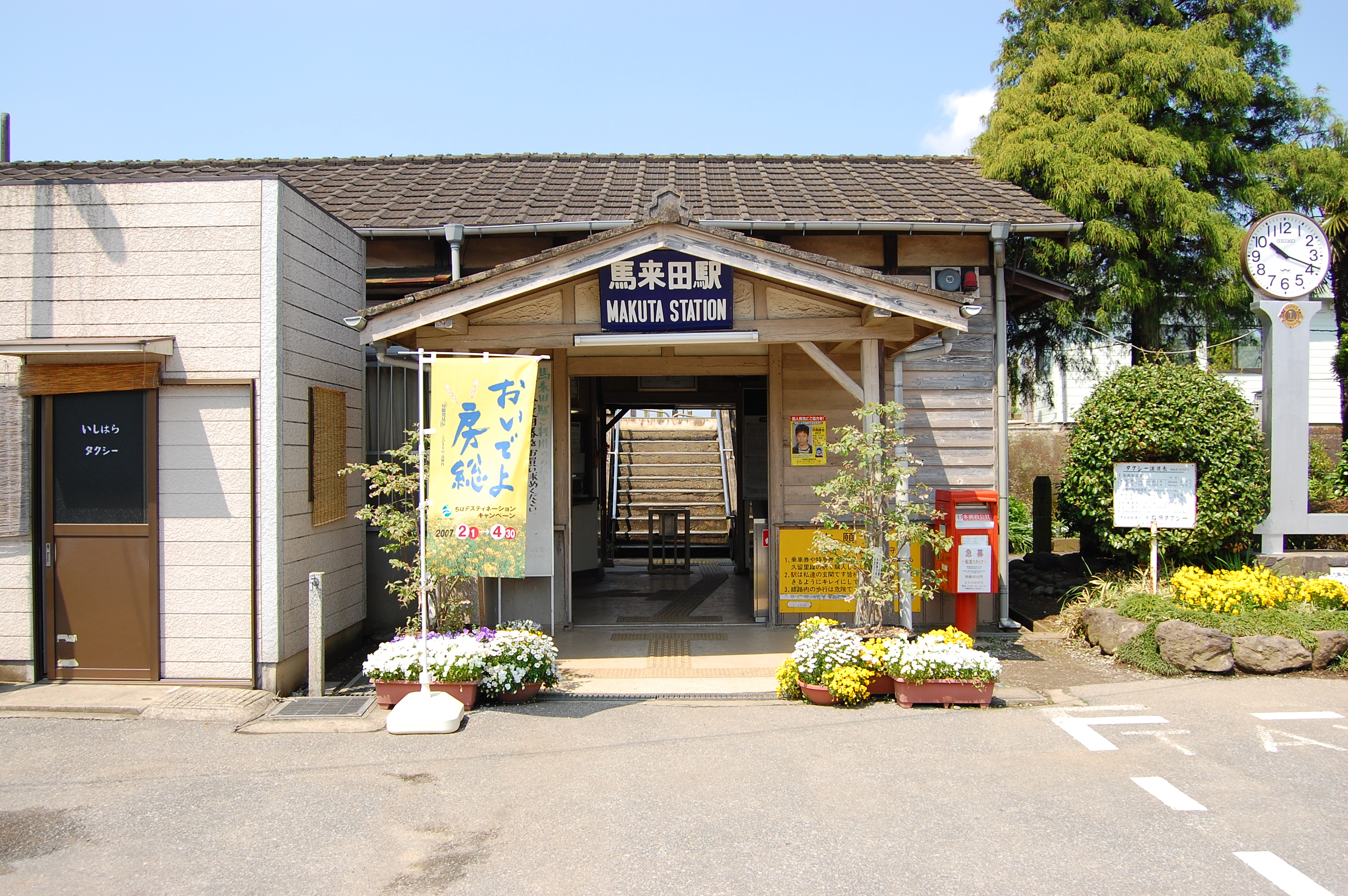
- Makuta Station, April 2007

General information
- Location: Makuta 107, Kisarazu-shi, Chiba-ken 292-0212; Japan
- Coordinates: 35°22′0.31″N 140°3′31.20″E
- Operator: JR East
- Line: ■ Kururi Line
- Distance: 13.9 km from Kisarazu
- Platforms: 1 side platform

Other information
- Status: Staffed
- Website: Official website

History
- Opened: December 28, 1912

Passengers
- FY2019: 191 daily

Services
Preceding station	JR East	Following station
Higashi-Yokota towards Kisarazu	Kururi Line	Shimogōri towards Kazusa-Kameyama
Location
- Location within Chiba Prefecture Location within Japan

Makuta Station (馬来田駅, Makuta-eki) is a passenger railway station in the city of Kisarazu, Chiba Prefecture, Japan, operated by the East Japan Railway Company (JR East).

== Lines ==
Makuta Station is a station on the Kururi Line, and is located 13.9 km from the terminus of the line at Kisarazu Station.

== Station layout ==
The station consists of a single side platform that serves bidirectional traffic. The platform is short, and can only handle trains with a length of five carriages or less. The station formerly had two opposed side platforms; however, one platform is no longer in operation. The station is staffed.

=== Platform ===
1	■ Kururi Line	For Kisarazu; Kazusa-Kameyama

== History ==
Makuta Station was opened on December 28, 1912 as a station on the Chiba Prefectural Railways Kururi Line. The line was nationalized into the Japanese Government Railways (JGR) on September 1, 1923. The JGR became the Japan National Railways (JNR) after World War II. The station was absorbed into the JR East network upon the privatization of the JNR on April 1, 1987.

== Passenger statistics ==
In fiscal 2019, the station was used by an average of 191 passengers daily (boarding passengers only).

== Surrounding area ==
- National Route 410
- Kisarazu City Hall Tomikuda Branch Office
- Fukuta Community Center

== See also ==
- List of railway stations in Japan
