= Obitsu River =

Coordinates: 35°24′31″N 139°53′54″E

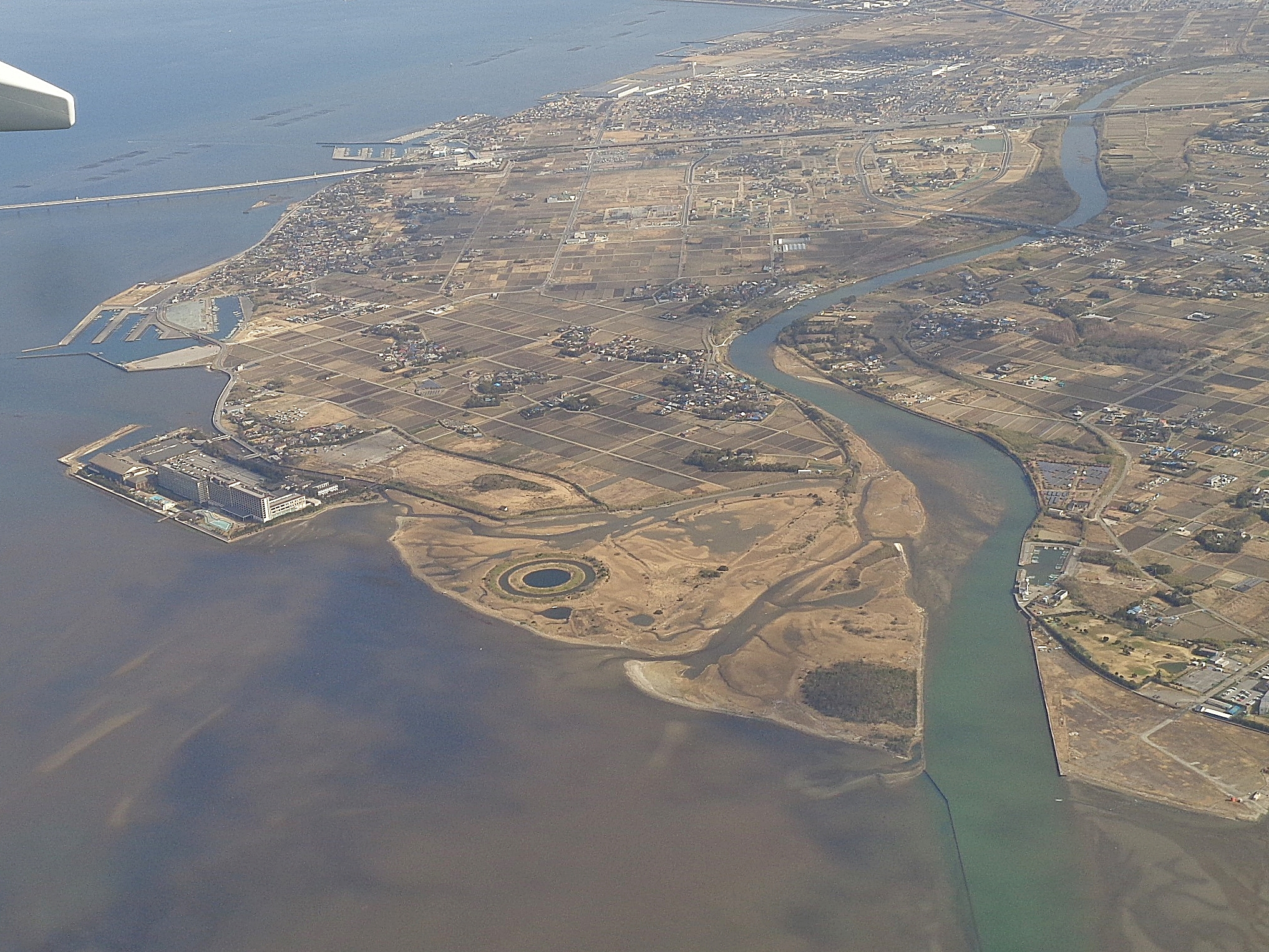
- River mouth

- Location within Japan
- Native name: 小櫃川 (Japanese)

Location
- Country: Japan

Physical characteristics
- Source
  - location: Mount Motokiyosumi (元清澄山, Motokiyosumi-san), Kimitsu, Chiba Prefecture
- Mouth
  - location: Tokyo Bay, Kisarazu, Chiba Prefecture
  - elevation: 0 m (0 ft)
- Length: 88 km (55 mi)
- Basin size: 273.2 km^{2} (105.5 sq mi)

The Obitsu River (小櫃川, Obitsu-gawa) is a river in Kimitsu, Kisarazu, and Sodegaura, Chiba Prefecture, Japan. The river is 88 kilometers (55 mi) in length and has a drainage area of 273.2 square kilometers (105.5 sq mi).

== Description ==
The Obitsu emerges from the densely forested valleys around Mount Motokiyosumi (344 meters (1,129 ft)) in the Bōsō Hill Range and empties into Tokyo Bay. It is the second largest river in Chiba Prefecture after the Tone River (322 kilometers (200 mi)). The upper reaches of the Obitsu meander through Kimitsu, the middle of the river runs more directly through Kisarazu, and the lower reaches form and estuary and a triangular delta in Sodegaura, an area known as the Banzu Tidal Flats. The Obitsu then turns briefly west back into Kisarazu to empty into Tokyo Bay. The tidal flats of the Obitsu host numerous species of birds and crustaceans. In 2012 an IUCN Red List endangered species crab, Uca lactea lactea, was discovered at the mouth of the river, and may be the northernmost habitat of the crab in Japan.

The Koito River, similarly to the Obitsu, emerges from Mount Motokiyosumi, flows east across Bōsō Peninsula, and empties into Tokyo Bay. The two rivers are the longest in the western region of the peninsula.

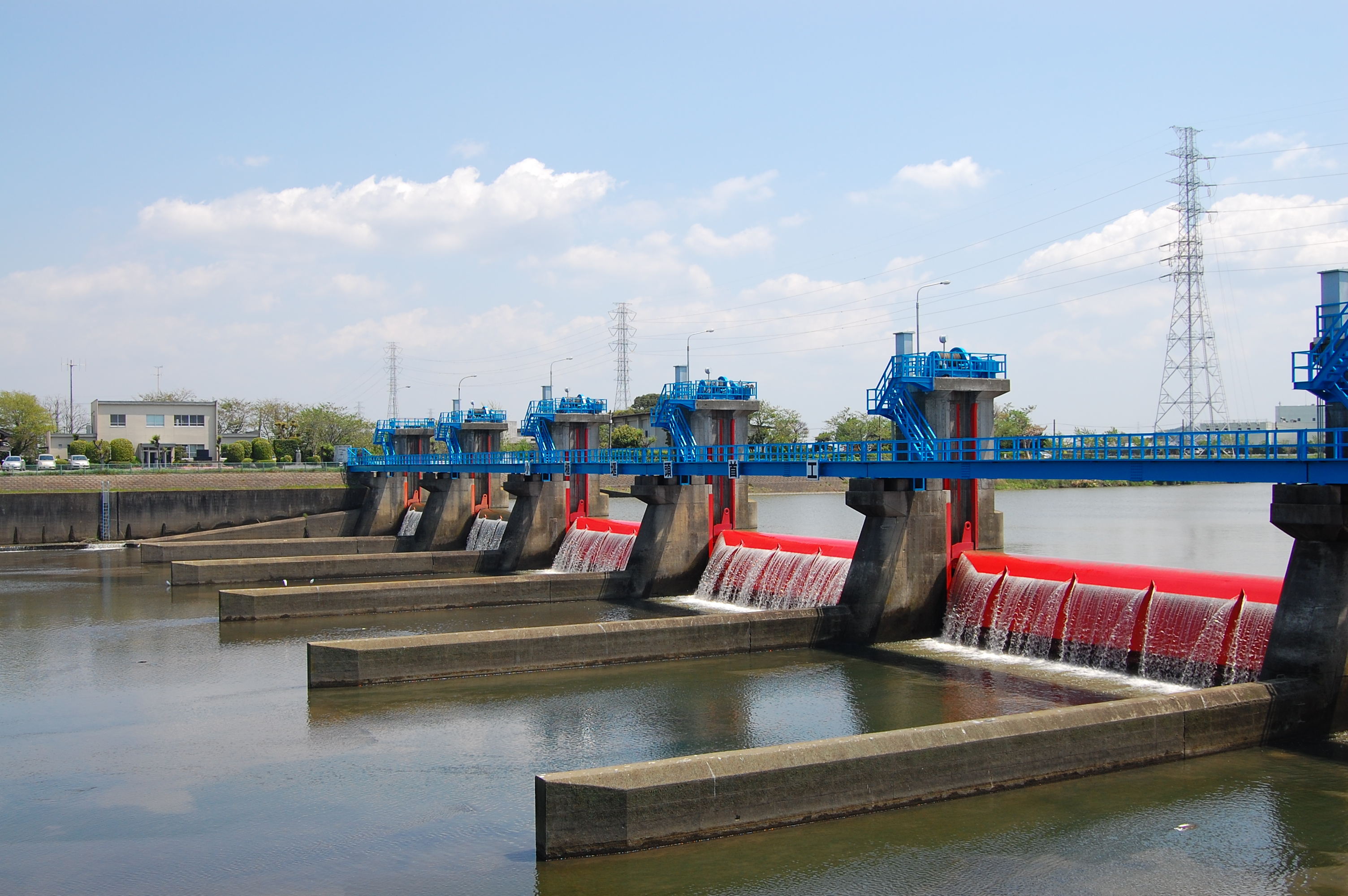
Obitsu Weir

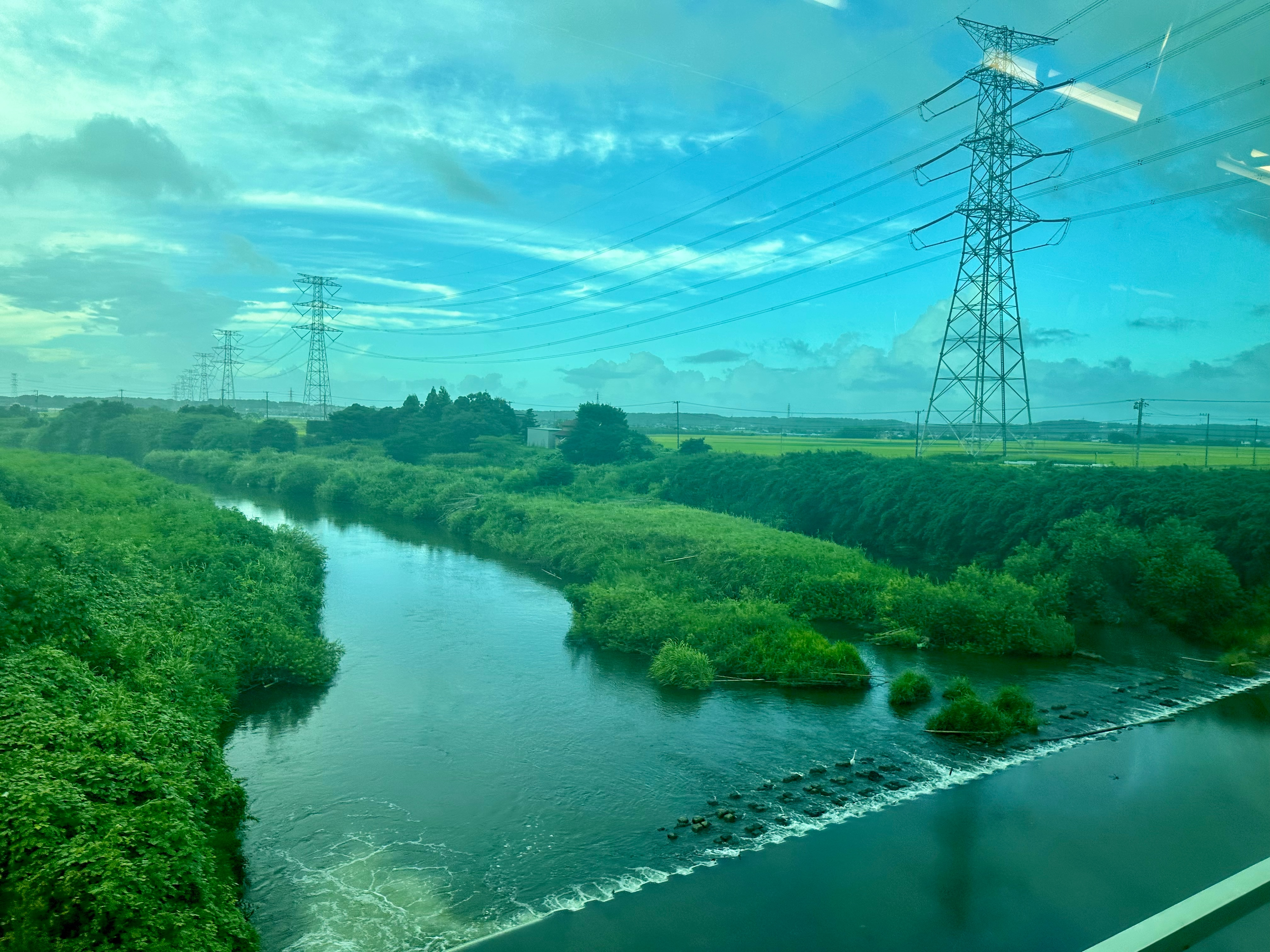
Middle reaches. Taken from Kururi Line.

== Kamegawa Dam ==
The Kamegawa Dam was built near the Kazusa-Kameyama Station on the JR East Kururi Line on the upper part of the Obitsu River in 1979. The dam forms an artificial lake, Lake Kameyama. The lake is the largest reservoir in Chiba Prefecture with a diameter of 35 kilometers (22 mi).

== Tributaries ==
| Name | Length | Basin Area |
|---|---|---|
| Matsu River (松川, Matsu-gawa) | 10.4 kilometers (6.5 mi) | 25.6 square kilometers (9.9 sq mi) |
| Yarimizu River (槍水川, Yarimizu-gawa) | 3.6 kilometers (2.2 mi) | 2.84 square kilometers (1.10 sq mi) |
| Takeda River (武田川, Takeda-gawa) | 15.2 kilometers (9.4 mi) | 16.7 square kilometers (6.4 sq mi) |
| Hasentakeda River (派川武田川, Hasentakeda-gawa) | 1.5 kilometers (0.93 mi) | 1 square kilometer (0.39 sq mi) |
| Nanamagari River (七曲川, Nanamagari-gawa) | 8 kilometers (5.0 mi) | 8.14 square kilometers (3.14 sq mi) |
| Ohara River (御腹川, Ohara-gawa) | 17.1 kilometers (10.6 mi) | 23.8 square kilometers (9.2 sq mi) |
| Ōmori River (大森川, Ōmori-gawa) | 2.6 kilometers (1.6 mi) | 10.4 square kilometers (4.0 sq mi) |
| Sasa River (笹川, Sasa-gawa) | 21 kilometers (13 mi) | 22.6 square kilometers (8.7 sq mi) |
| Inokawa River (猪ノ川, Inokawa) | N/A | N/A |
| Shichiri River (七里川, Shichiri-gawa) | N/A | N/A |

== History ==
=== Early history ===
The Obitsu River supported a rich population in the Jōmon period (ca. 14,000–300 BC) as evidenced by large-scale kaizuka midden, or shell mounds. The shell mounds of Chiba Prefecture are the largest in Japan, and the Gion Shell Mound (祇園貝塚, Gion-kaizuka), along the Obitsu in the Gion District of Kisarazu, dates from the mid-Jōmon period. While there is some evidence of large-scale settlement along the Obitsu in the Yayoi period (300 BC–250 AD), the entire eastern Bōsō area was again richly populated in the Kofun period (250–538).

=== Edo period ===
Inland water transportation to connect the agriculture-rich middle and upper regions of the Obitsu developed slowly and reached its zenith on the Obitsu River in the Edo period (1603–1868). The Tokugawa shogunate showed strong interest in products from Kazusa Province. The shogunate excavated and straightened the meandering middle part of the Obitsu River to develop new paddy fields for the cultivation of rice and renkon lotus root. Like the Yōrō River and the Koito River, small riverboats were used on the Obitsu. Rice, as the nengu tax tribute to the Tokugawa shogunate, passed from the former Kururi Region of Kimitsu to the port at Kisarazu, typically crossing a distance of 27.5 square kilometers (10.6 sq mi). Charcoal, an essential product in the Edo capital, was produced in the central region of the Boso Peninsula, and was another essential trade product on the Obitsu. In the most prosperous period of the Obitsu River, there were 35 riverboats active in trade, and most were property of individual villages along middle and upper reaches of the river. The mouth of the Obitsu River became a lively trade center, as the Port of Kisarazu had exclusive rights to sea traffic between the western Bōsō Peninsula and the Edo capital.

=== Modern period ===
The lower parts of the Obitsu River along Tokyo Bay were developed in the early 20th century to support growing industrial facilities along Tokyo Bay., and this area ultimately became an important part of the Keiyō Industrial Zone. Despite the large industrial development of the lower part of Obitsu River, the middle and upper ranges of the continue to be used extensively for rice and vegetable production. The Obitsu River in the area around the Nagasuka, Kisarazu has historically been used for large-scale renkon lotus root cultivation. The low, damps areas of the river have been developed into rice paddy fields and fields for the production of lotus root. The renkon of the area became popular in the Tokyo area at the end of the Edo period, and remain in cultivation today. Additionally, the shallows at the Banzu Tidal Flats formed the largest area of nori seaweed cultivation in the Tokyo Bay region.

== Recreation ==
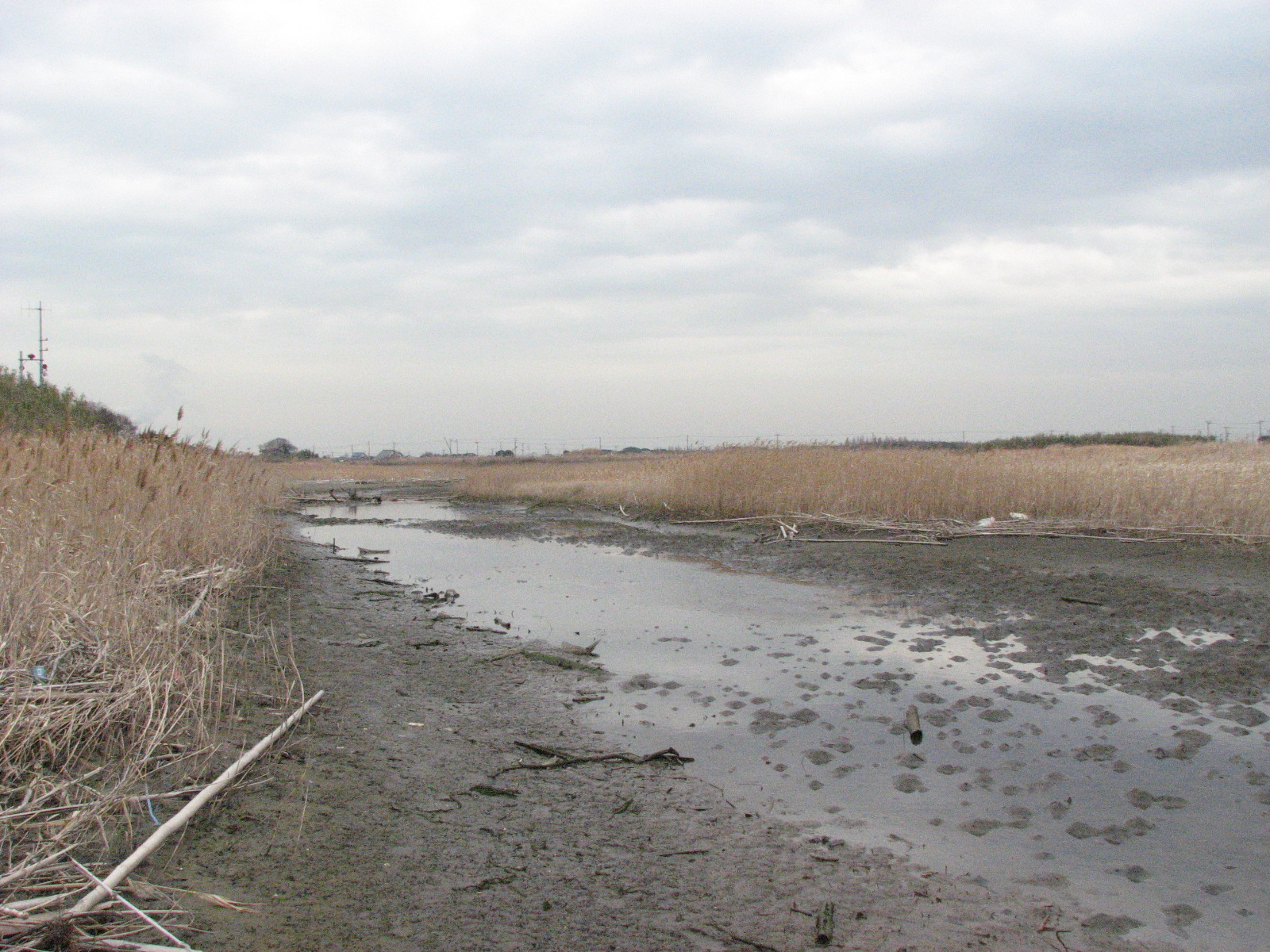
Reeds at Banzu Tidal Flats of the Obitsu River, Tokyo Bay

=== Kimitsu ===
- Lake Kameyama has developed tourist facilities. The lake is ringed by a pedestrian path, has a family campground, and is the only spot in Chiba Prefecture for lure fishing. Lake Kameyama is accessible from the JR East Kururi Line Kazusa-Kameyama Station.

=== Kisarazu ===
- The renkon lotus fields of Kisarazu can be accessed from Obitsuzeki Park (小櫃堰公園, Obitsuzeki Koen), 358 Gion, Kisarazu, Chiba. The park is a 10-minute walk from the JR East Kururi Line Gion Station.

=== Sodegaura ===
- Clamming and shell gathering are popular in the Banzu Tidal Flats of the Obitsu.

== Footnote ==
- Other sources place the river at 75 kilometers (47 mi).
