= KiHa E130 series =

Japanese train type

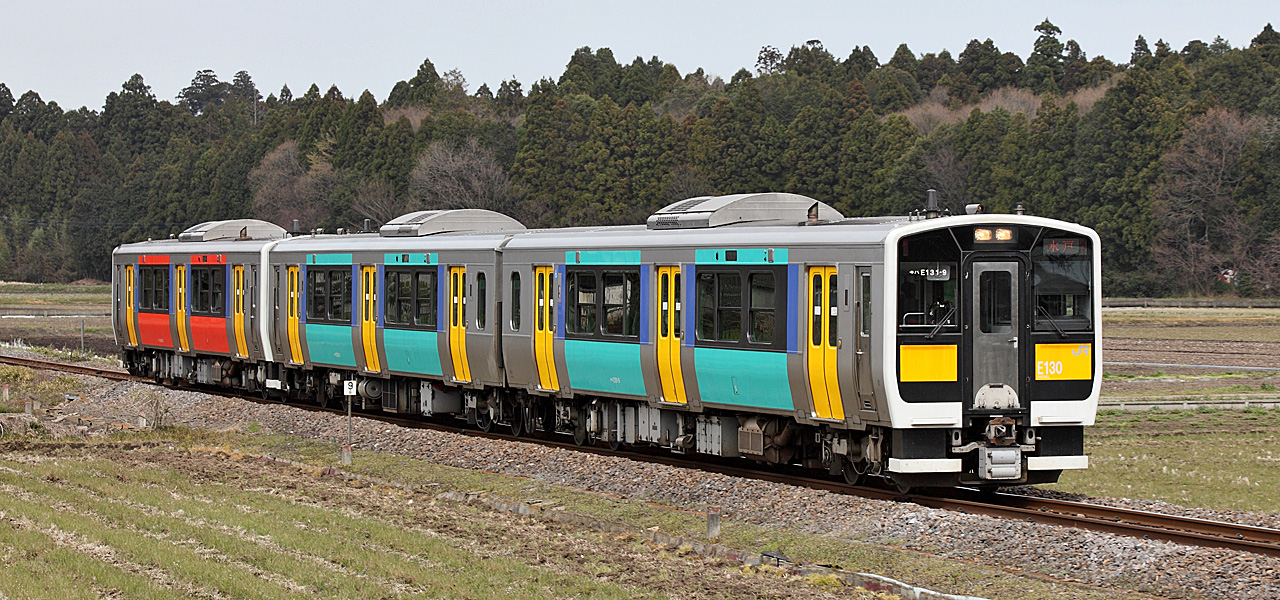
- A 3-car KiHa E130 series formation on the Suigun Line in April 2010
- Manufacturers: Niigata Transys, Tokyu Car Corporation
- Replaced: KiHa 35, KiHa 38, KiHa 110 series
- Constructed: 2006–
- Entered service: January 2007
- Number built: 67 vehicles
- Number in service: 67 vehicles
- Formation: 1 or 2 cars per unit
- Operator: JR East
- Depot: Suigun (Hitachi Daigo)
- Lines served: Suigun Line, Kururi Line, Hachinohe Line

Specifications
- Car body construction: Stainless steel
- Car length: 19,500 mm (64 ft 0 in)
- Width: 2,920 mm (9 ft 7 in)
- Floor height: 1,130 mm (3 ft 8 in)
- Doors: Three pairs per side
- Maximum speed: 100 km/h (60 mph)
- Prime mover: DMF15HZ x1 per car
- Power output: 331 kW (444 hp) per car
- Transmission: Hydraulic
- Bogies: DT74 (motored), TR259 (trailer)
- Safety system: ATS-Ps
- Multiple working: KiHa 110 series
- Track gauge: 1,067 mm (3 ft 6 in)

The KiHa E130 series (キハE130系) is a class of diesel multiple unit (DMU) trains operated since January 2007 by the East Japan Railway Company (JR East) in Japan.

The "KiHa" designation derives from the classification system used by Japanese National Railways (JNR). "Ki" indicates a diesel-powered vehicle, while "Ha" indicates an ordinary passenger car, as opposed to a green car.

== Variants ==
- KiHa E130-0 series: Single-car and two-car units used on the Suigun Line since January 2007
- KiHa E130-100 series: Single-car units used on the Kururi Line since 1 December 2012
- KiHa E130-500 series: Single-car and two-car units used on the Hachinohe Line since December 2017

== KiHa E130-0 series ==
The Suigun Line KiHa E130-0 series fleet, based at Suigun Depot (Hitachi Daigo), consists of 39 cars formed as 13 single-car KiHa E130 units and 13 two-car (KiHa E131 + KiHa E132) sets. These trains are operated on services between Mito and Kōriyama. They entered service from January 2007, totally replacing the KiHa 110 series DMUs previously used on this line by September of the same year.

The first KiHa E130 single-car units were delivered from Niigata Transys in December 2006, with 12 cars delivered by the end of January 2007. KiHa E130-13 was delivered in August 2007. Deliveries of the two-car sets began in February 2007, with the final sets delivered in August 2007. All of the two-car sets were built by Niigata Transys except for two sets, 8 and 9, which were built by Tokyu Car Corporation.

=== Exterior ===
The single-car (KiHa E130) units have red colouring on the sides, while the two-car (KiHa E131 + KiHa E132) units have turquoise colouring. The doors and cab end panels of both types are yellow.

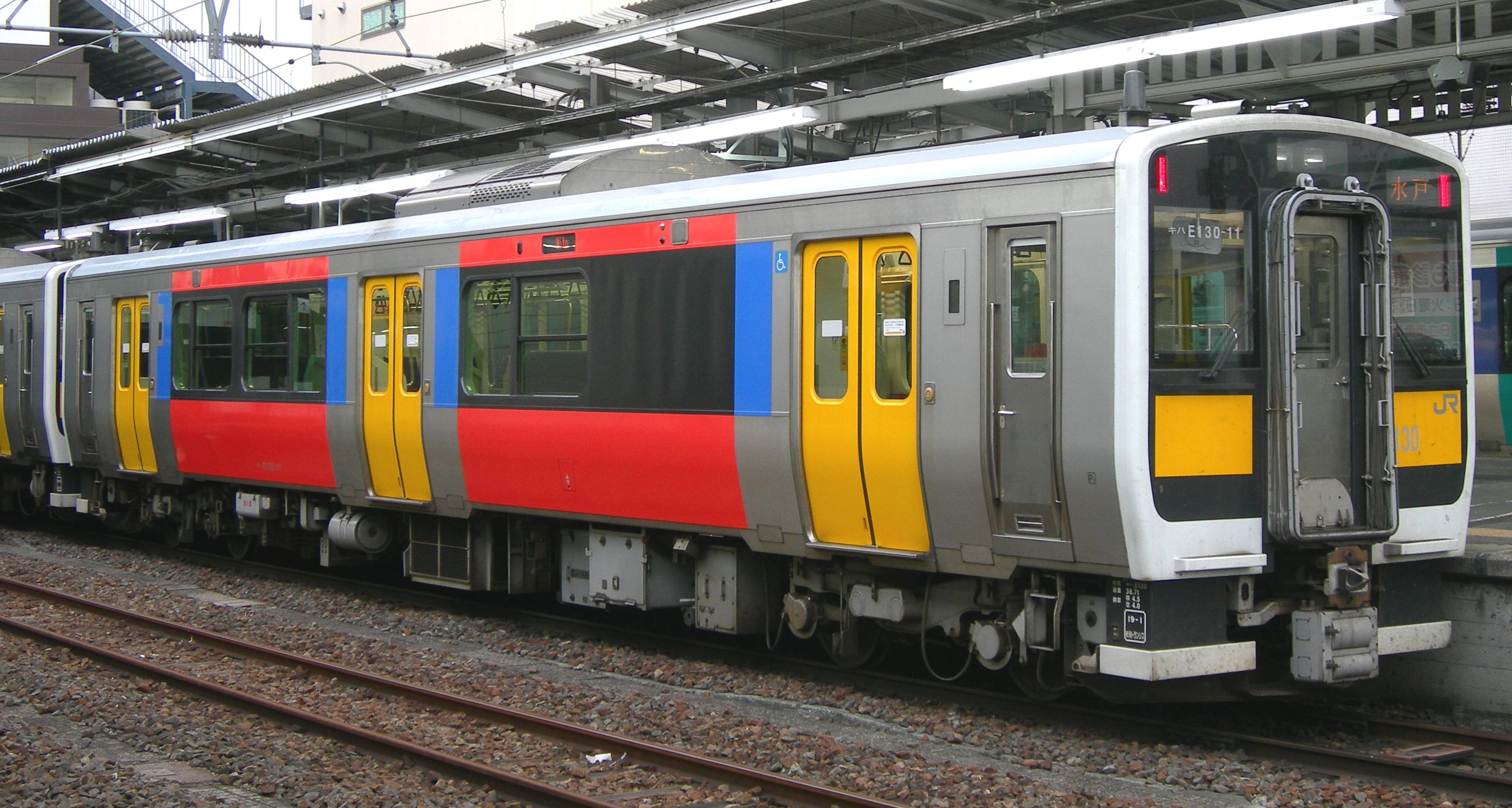
Single-car KiHa E130-11 at Mito Station in August 2010

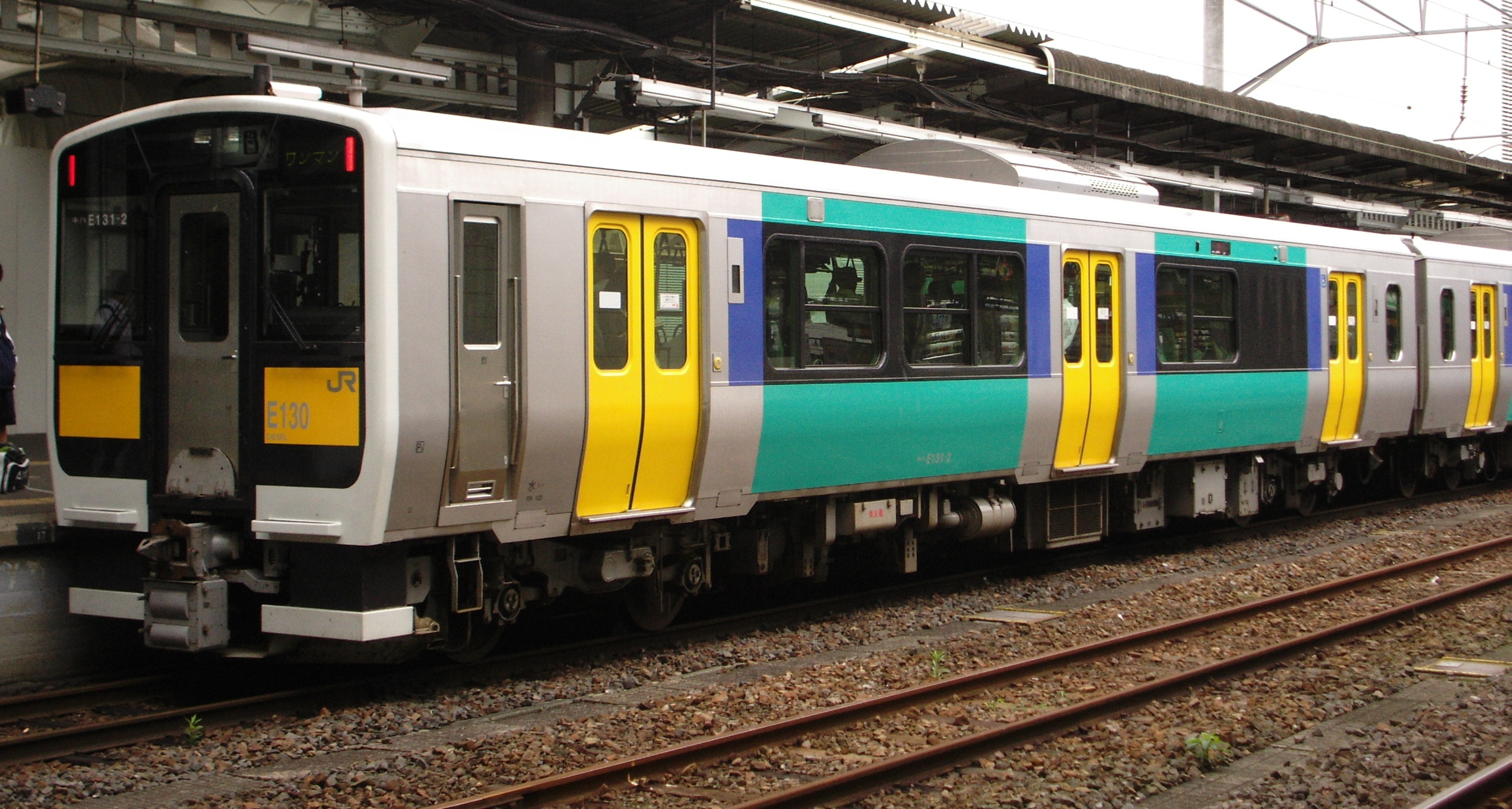
KiHa E131-2 at Mito Station in September 2007

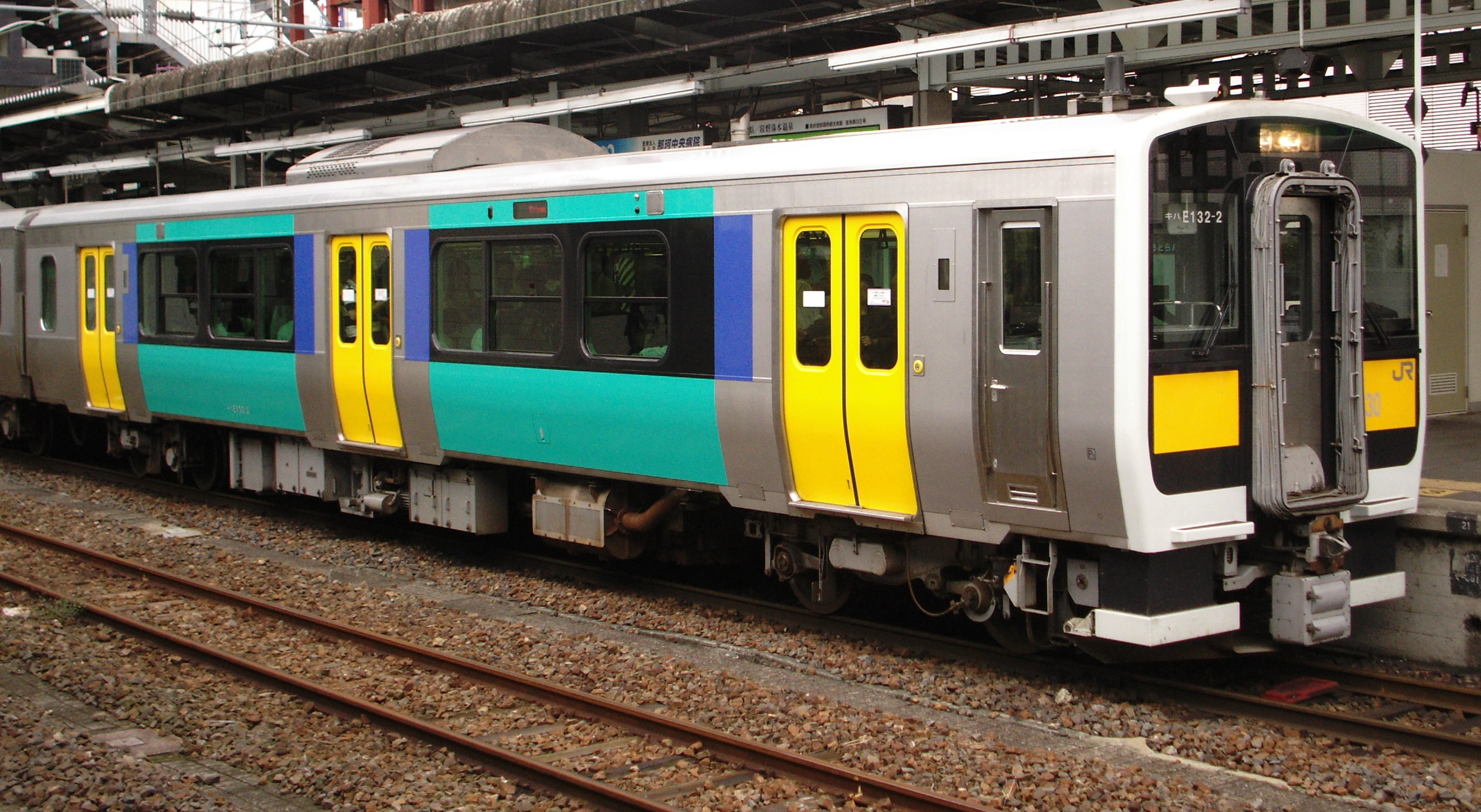
KiHa E132-2 at Mito Station in September 2007

=== Interior ===
Passenger accommodation consists of 1+2 abreast facing seating bays in the centre of each car, and longitudinal bench seating at the ends of cars. Toilets (in KiHa E130 and KiHa E131 cars) are universal access.

The cars are equipped with fare machines for use on driver-only operated services.

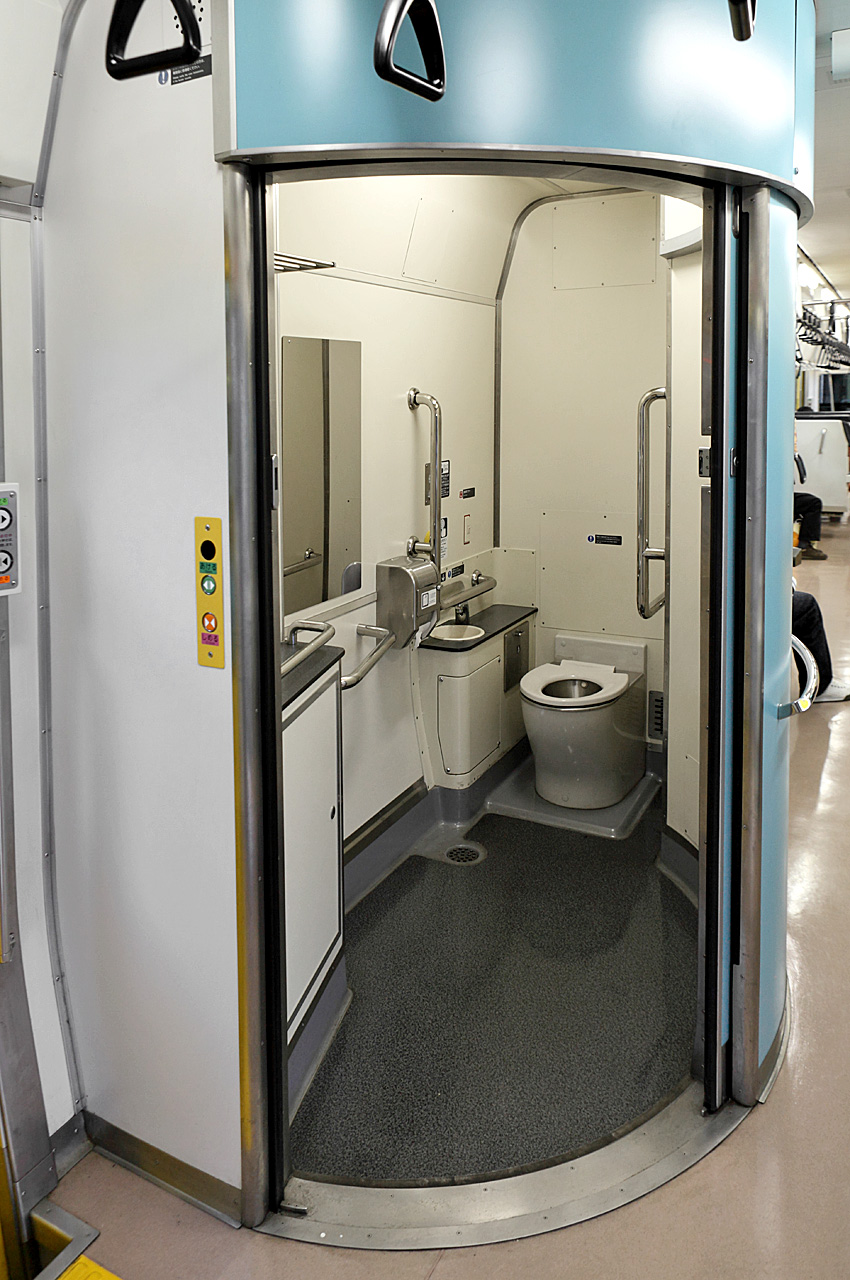
Wheelchair-accessible toilet in April 2010

=== Formations ===
==== KiHa E130-0 single-car units ====
- KiHa E130-1–13

Numbering	KiHa E130
Weight (t)	38.7
Capacity Total/seated	113/34

(Equipped with a toilet)

==== KiHa E130-0 2-car units ====
- KiHa E131-1–13 + KiHa E132-1–13

Numbering	KiHa E131	KiHa E132
Weight (t)	36.7	35.9
Capacity Total/seated	125/40	131/48

(KiHa E131 is equipped with a toilet.)

== KiHa E130-100 series ==
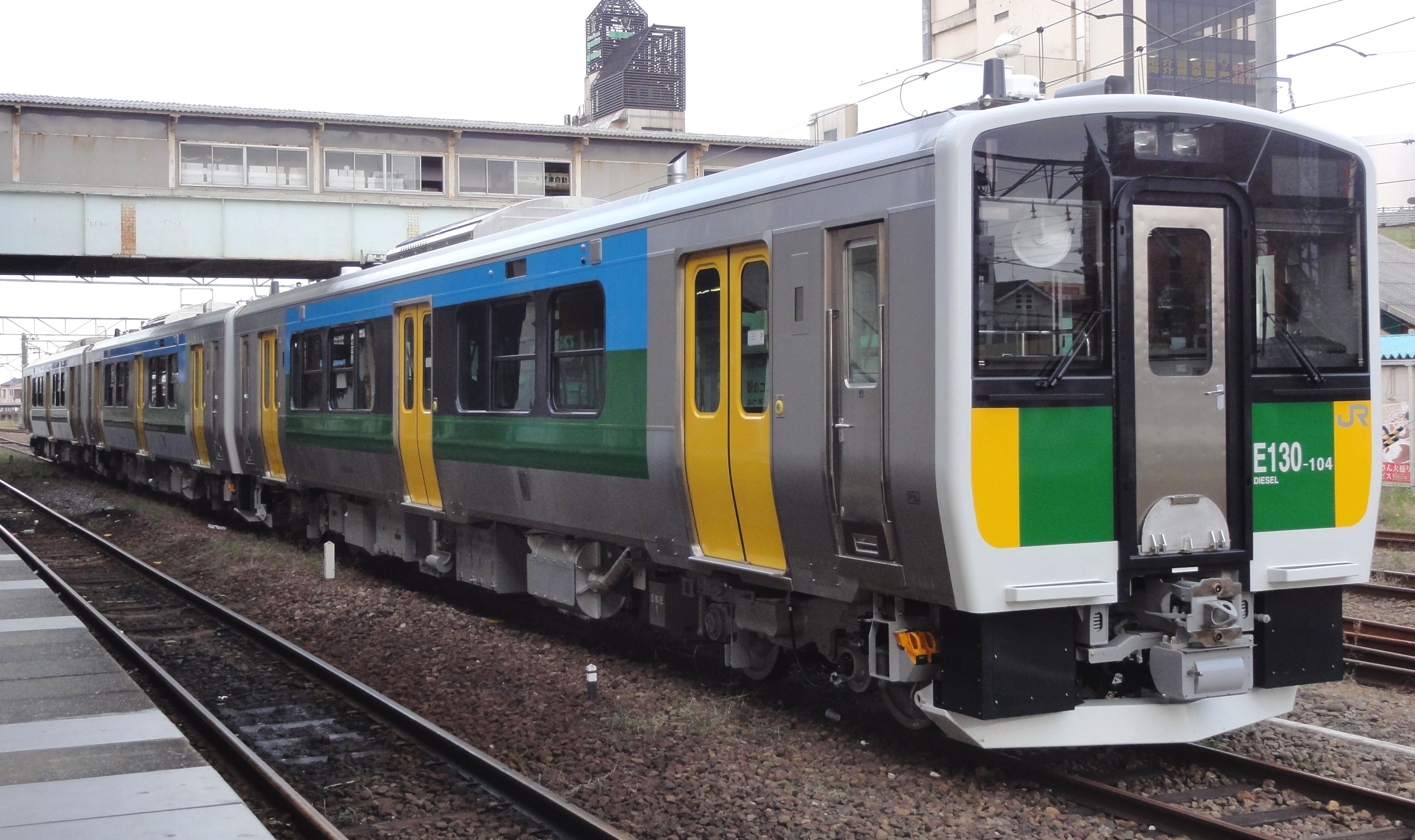
Kururi Line KiHa E130-104 at Kisarazu Station in October 2012

Ten new KiHa E130 series cars were introduced on the Kururi Line in Chiba Prefecture from 1 December 2012, replacing the ageing KiHa 30, KiHa 37, and KiHa 38 DMU cars previously operated.

The first three KiHa E130-100 series cars (101 to 103) designated for use on Kururi Line services were delivered from Niigata Transys in August 2012, followed by the remaining seven cars (104 to 110) in October 2012. These are scheduled to enter revenue service from 1 December 2012.

The Kururi Line KiHa E130-100 series sets have DT74A motored bogies and TR259A trailer bogies.

=== Interior ===
The Kururi Line KiHa E130-100 series cars have longitudinal seating only, and are not fitted with toilets.

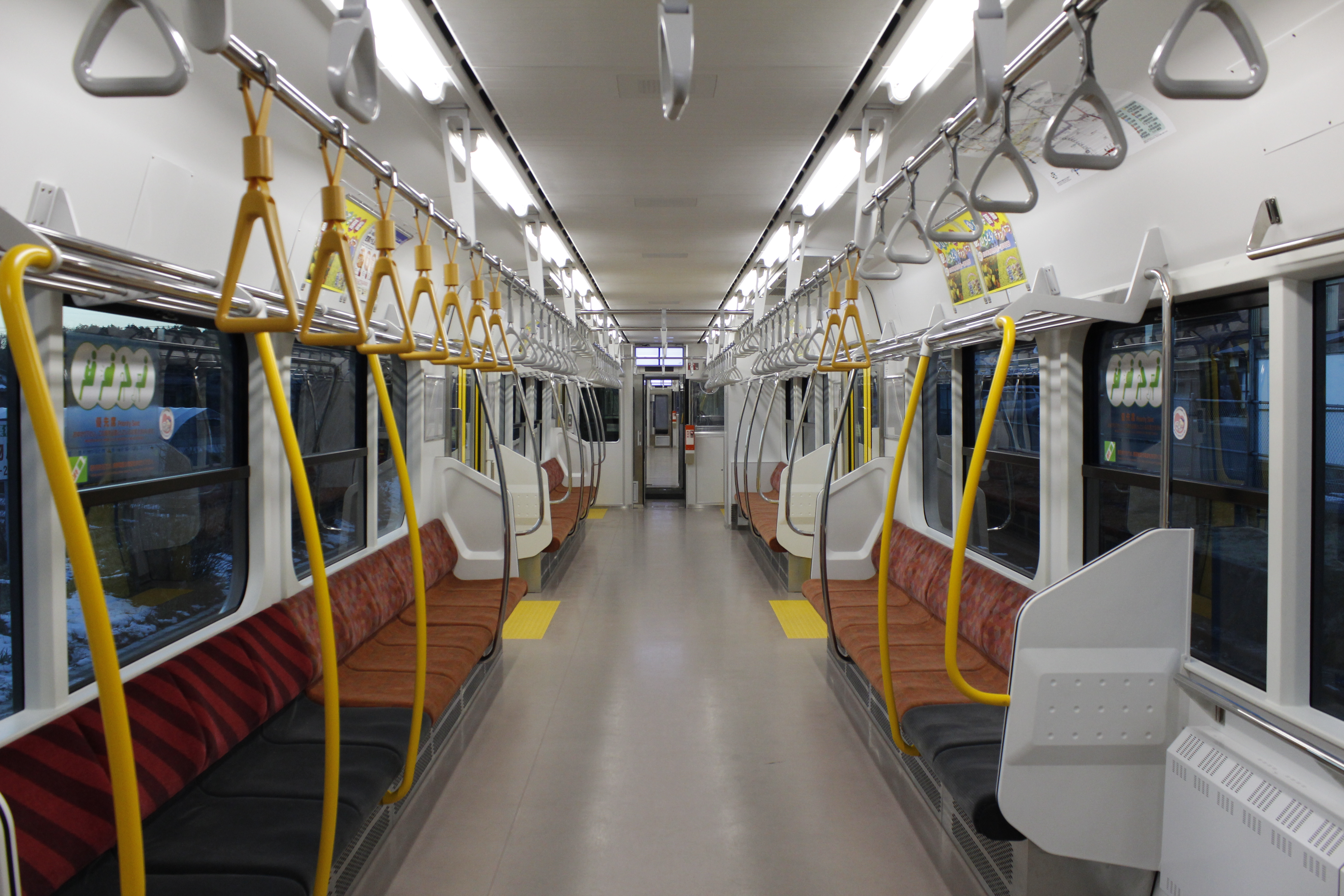
Interior of a Kururi Line KiHa E130-100 series car in January 2013

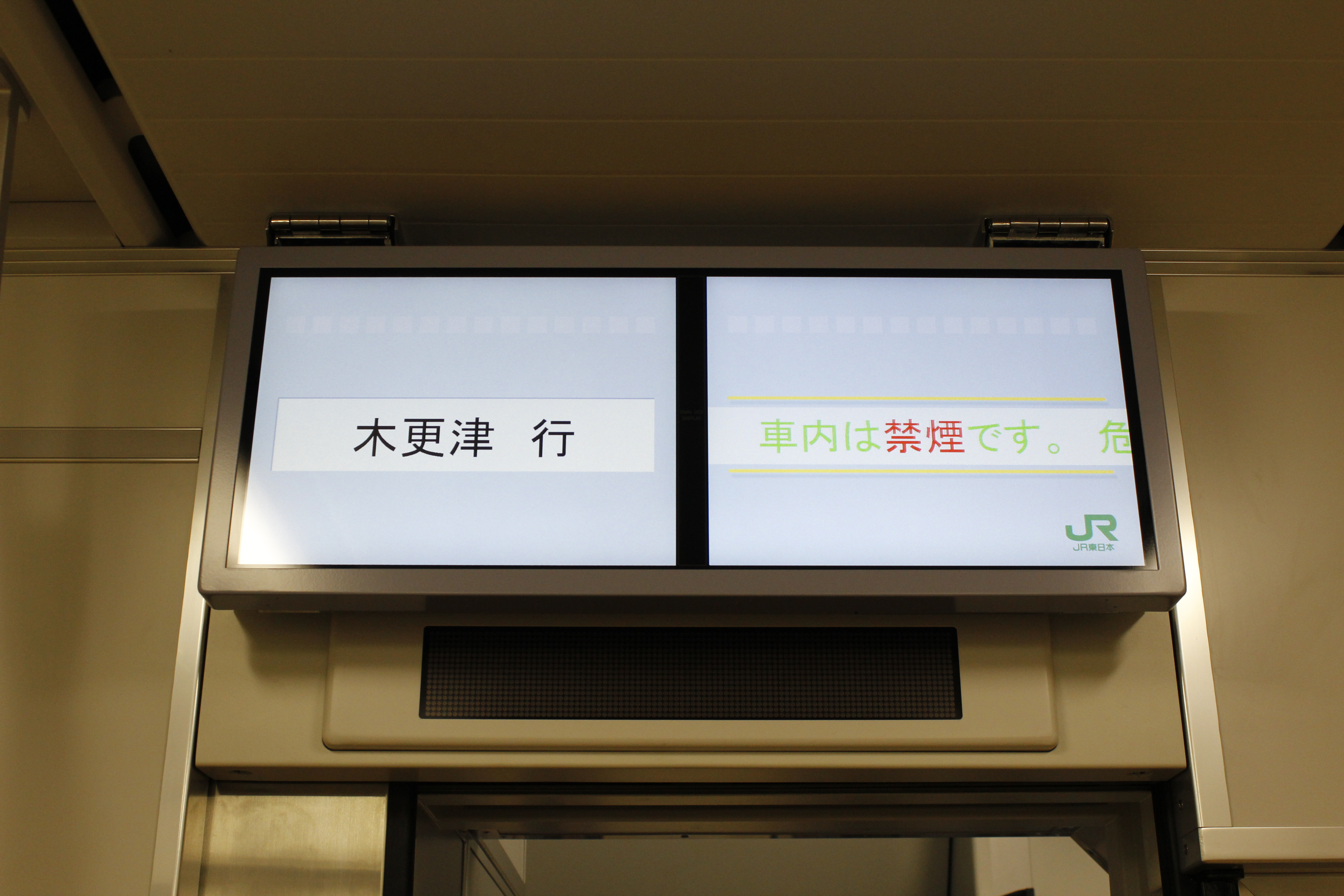
LCD passenger information display inside a Kururi Line KiHa E130-100 series car in January 2013

== KiHa E130-500 series ==
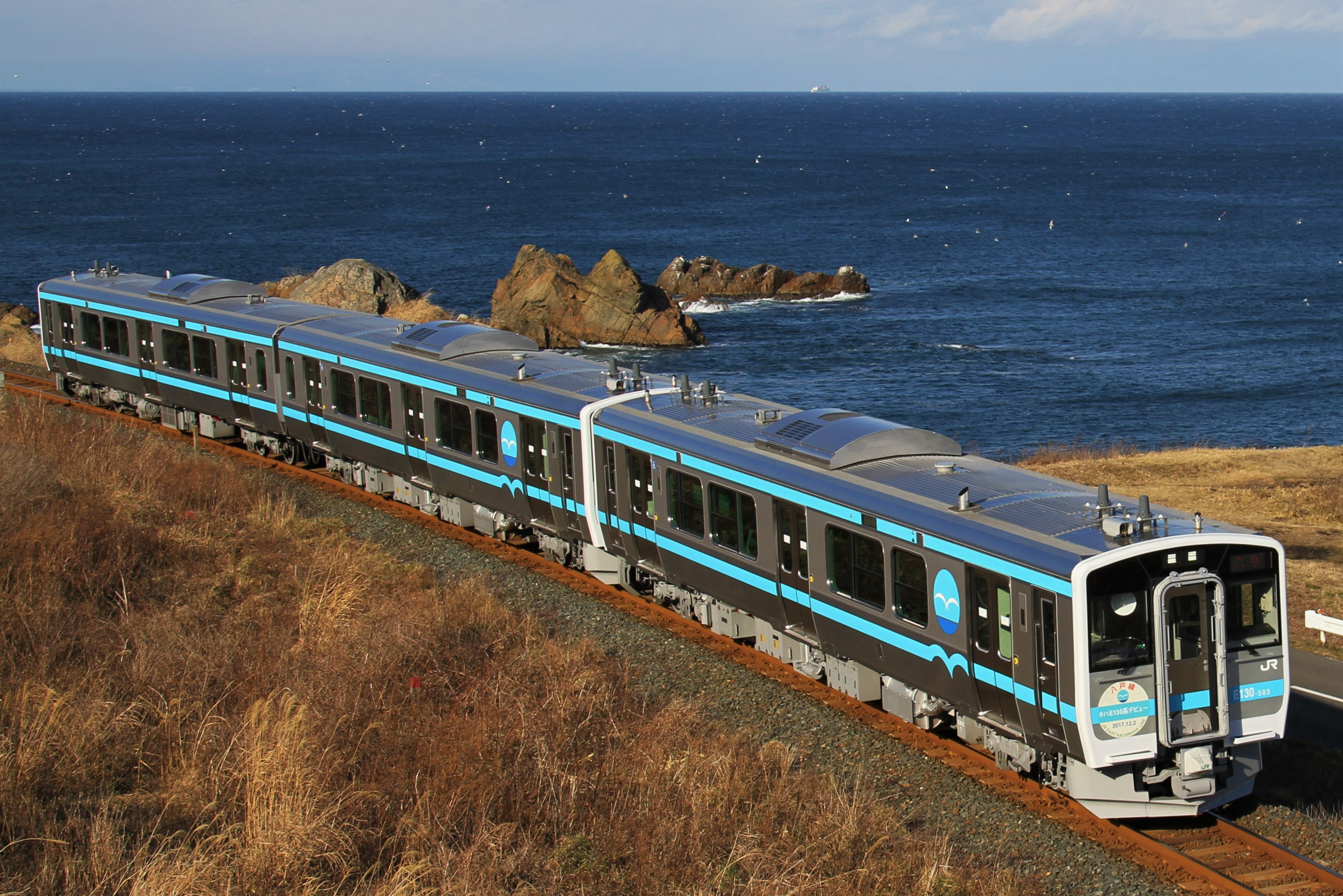
KiHa E130-500 series, December 2017

A fleet of new KiHa E130-500 series DMUs was introduced on the Hachinohe Line on 2 December 2017. The fleet consists of six two-car units and six single-car units. The first cars were delivered from Niigata Transys in August 2017, and initially tested in the Niigata area before being moved to Hachinohe in September 2017.
