= Yokota Station =

Railway station in Sodegaura, Chiba Prefecture, Japan

Yokota Station 横田駅
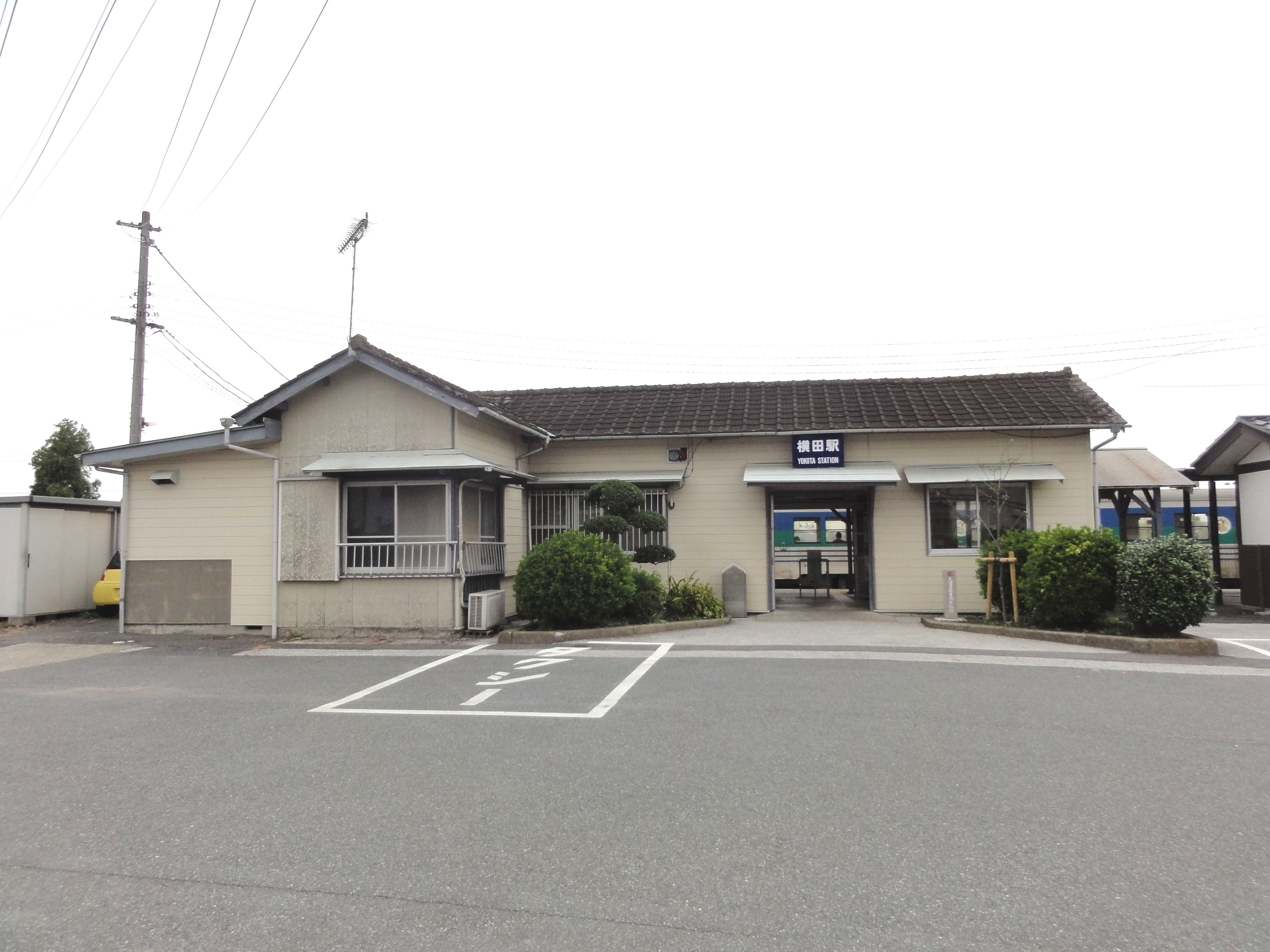
- Yokota Station, October 2012

General information
- Location: Yokota, Sodegaura-shi, Chiba-ken 299-0236; Japan
- Coordinates: 35°23′09.91″N 140°01′13.25″E
- Operator: JR East
- Line: ■ Kururi Line
- Distance: 9.3 km from Kisarazu
- Platforms: 2 side platforms

Other information
- Status: Staffed
- Website: Official website

History
- Opened: December 28, 1912
- Former names: Nakagawa (until 1915)

Passengers
- FY2019: 165

Services
Preceding station	JR East	Following station
Higashi-Kiyokawa towards Kisarazu	Kururi Line	Higashi-Yokota towards Kazusa-Kameyama
Location
- Location within Chiba Prefecture Location within Japan

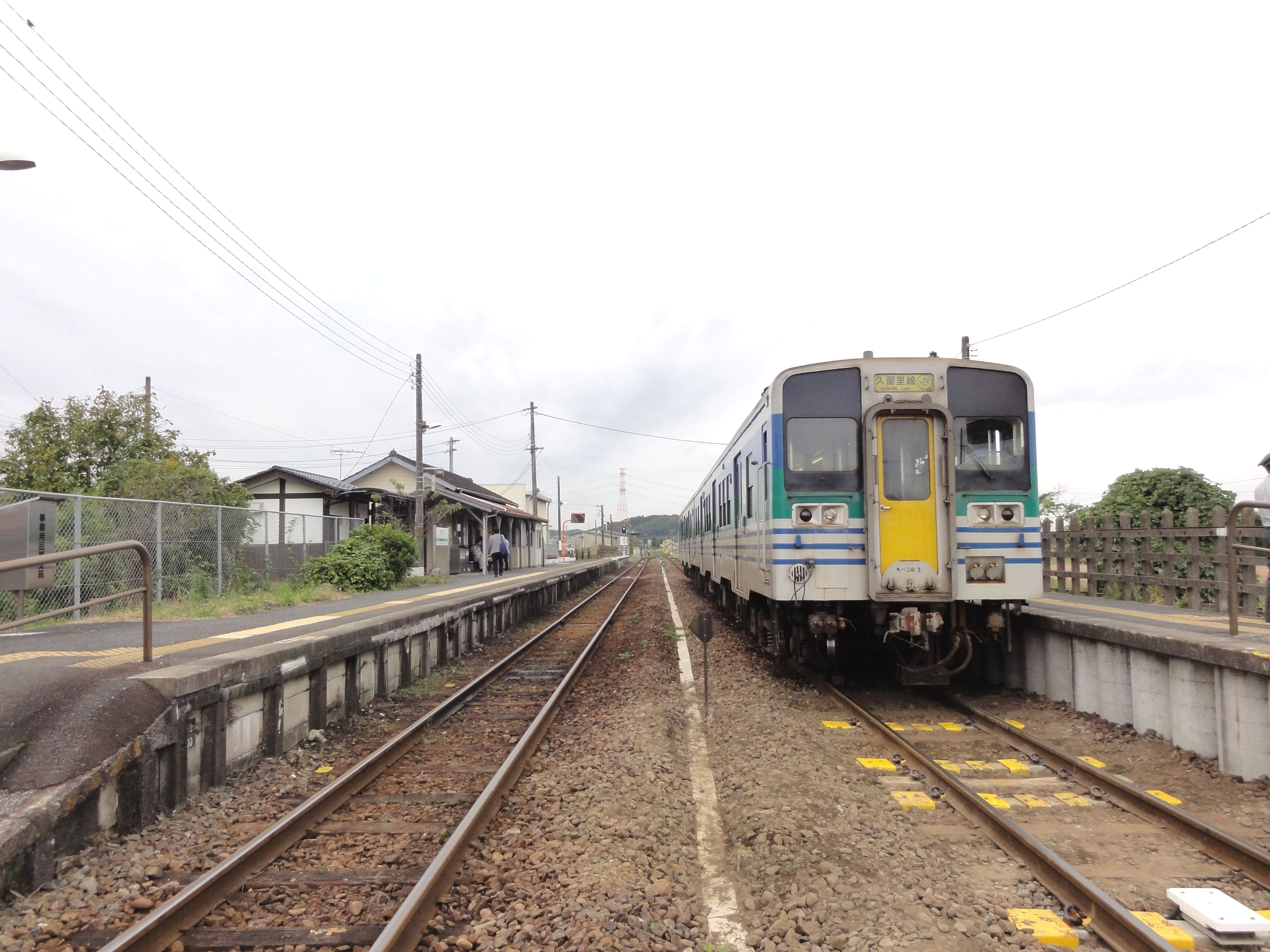
View of the platforms, October 2012

Yokota Station (横田駅, Yokota-eki) is a passenger railway station in the city of Sodegaura, Chiba Prefecture, Japan, operated by the East Japan Railway Company (JR East).

== Lines ==
Yokota Station is served by the Kururi Line, and is located 9.3 km from the western terminus of the line at Kisarazu Station.

== Station layout ==
The station consists of two opposed side platforms connected by a level crossing. The station is one of the few on the Kururi Line which is fully staffed, and which allows for trains coming from opposite directions to pass one another.

=== Platforms ===
1	■ Kururi Line	for Kisarazu
2	■ Kururi Line	for Kazusa-Kameyama

== History ==
Yokota Station opened on December 28, 1912 as Nakagawa Station (中川駅, Nakagawa-eki) on the Chiba Prefectural Railways Kururi Line. It was renamed Yokota Station on July 1, 1915. The line was nationalized into the Japanese Government Railways (JGR) on September 1, 1923. The JGR became the Japanese National Railways (JNR) after World War II. The station was absorbed into the JR East network upon the privatization of JNR on April 1, 1987.

== Passenger statistics ==
In fiscal 2019, the station was used by an average of 165 passengers daily (boarding passengers only).

== Surrounding area ==
- National Route 409

== See also ==
- List of railway stations in Japan
