= Kururi Line =

Railway line in Chiba Prefecture, Japan

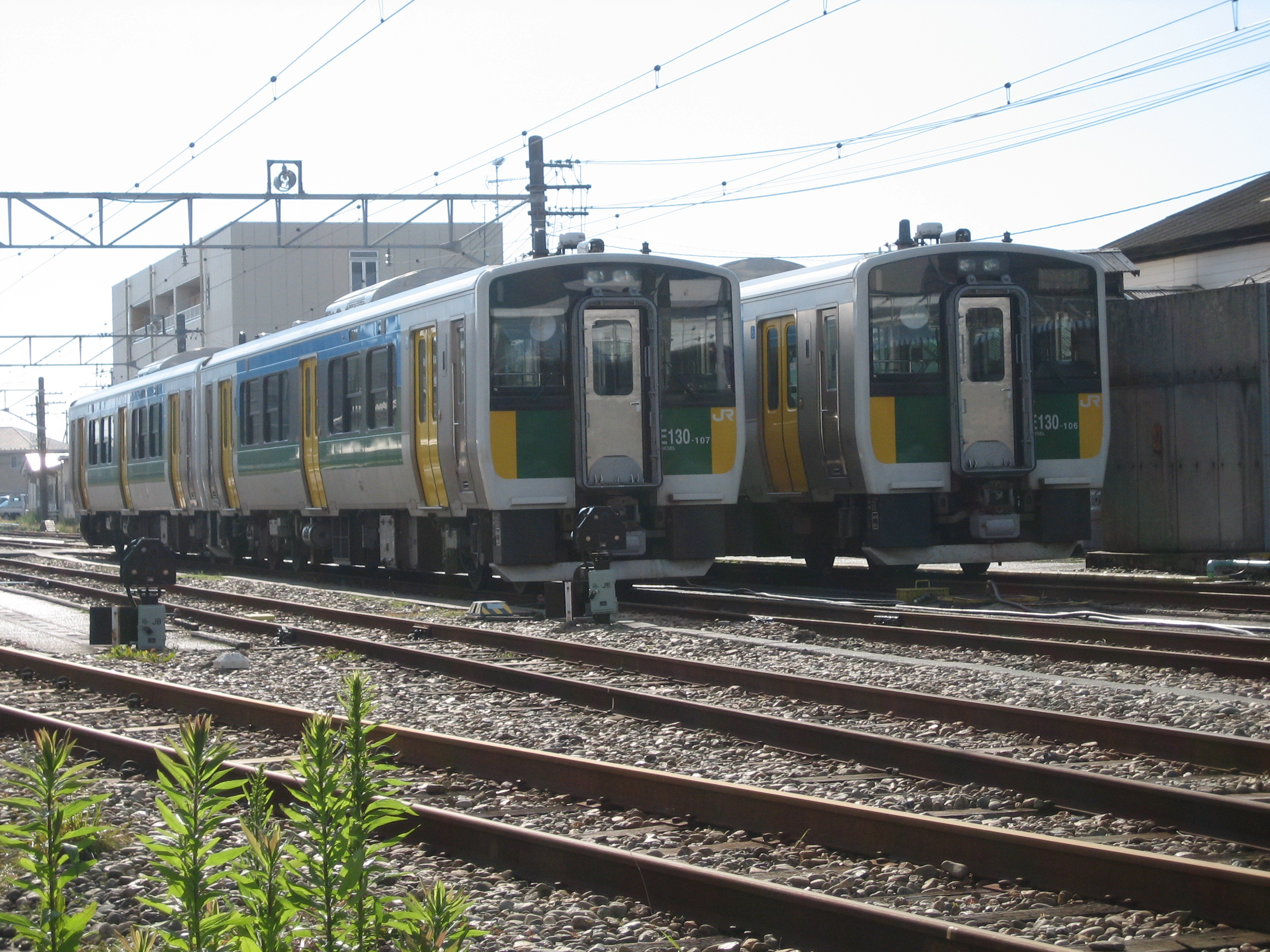
- Kururi Line E130 series DMUs

Overview
- Native name: 久留里線
- Status: In operation
- Owner: JR East
- Locale: Chiba Prefecture
- Termini: Kisarazu; Kazusa-Kameyama
- Stations: 14

Service
- Operator: JR East
- Depot: Kisarazu
- Rolling stock: KiHa E130 series DMU

History
- Opened: 28 December 1912; 113 years ago

Technical
- Line length: 32.2 km (20.0 mi)
- Num of tracks: Entire line single tracked
- Character: Rural
- Track gauge: 1,067 mm (3 ft 6 in)
- Electrification: None
- Operating speed: 65 km/h (40 mph)
Route map

Inside and outside a train on the Kururi Line, 2023

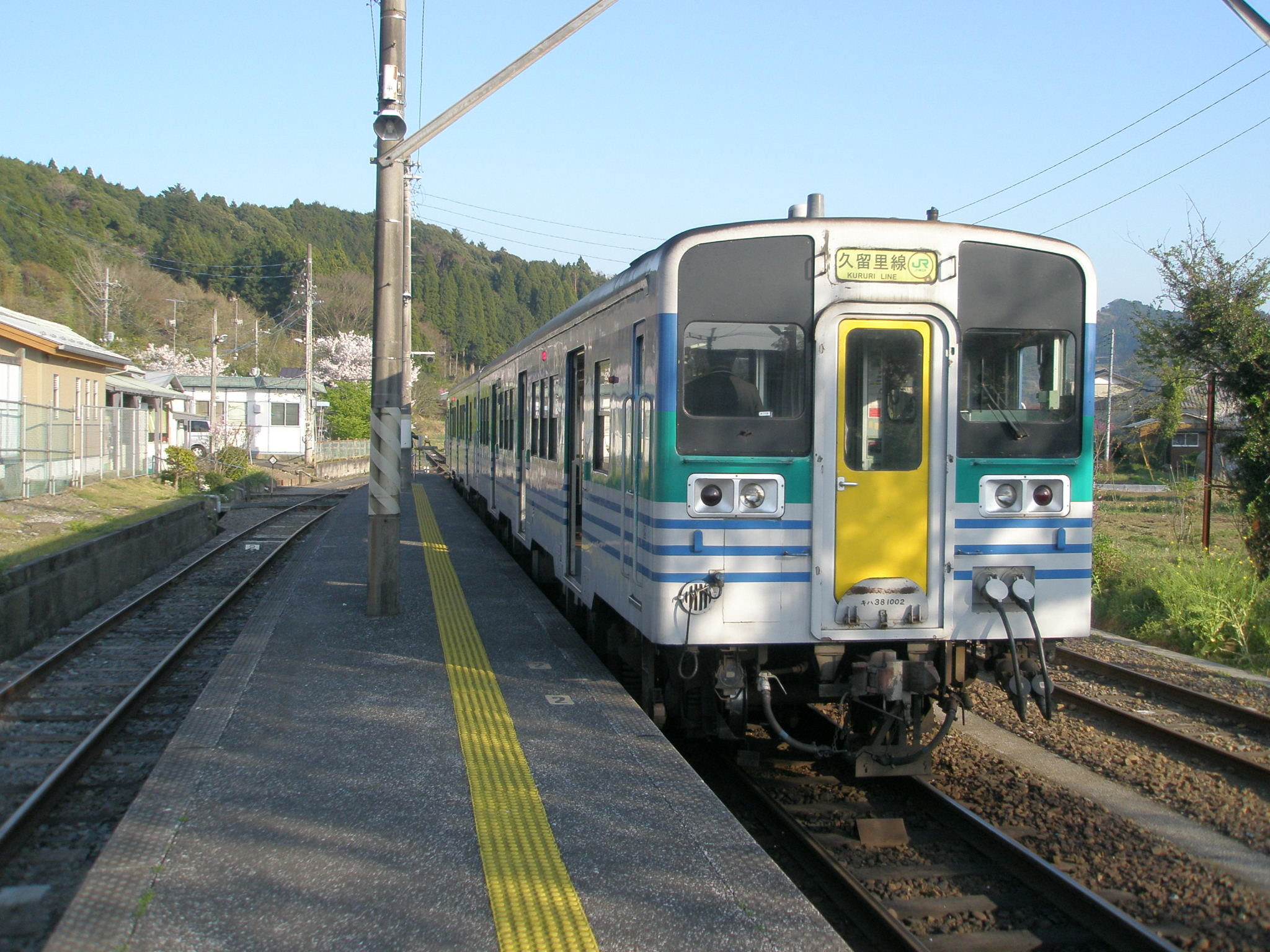
Kururi Line train waiting for departure at Kazusa-Kameyama Station, 2009

The Kururi Line (久留里線, Kururi-sen) is a railway line in Chiba Prefecture, Japan, operated by the East Japan Railway Company (JR East). It connects Kisarazu Station in Kisarazu to Kazusa-Kameyama Station in Kimitsu. The railway route extends through three cities, Kimitsu, Kisarazu, and Sodegaura. It has no double-track section and is not electrified. Trains can pass at only two stations, Yokota Station and Kururi Station.

The line runs mostly through a rural area and operates at a huge loss. JR East held consultations regarding the replacement of the line between Kururi and Kazusa-Kameyama with a bus service due to a ~75% decrease in ridership since 1987. This resulted in an announcement in February 2026, stating that this section of the line would be closed from April 2027.

Currently, Suica and other IC cards are not accepted for travel on the Kururi Line, however the section to remain open is set to receive IC card support from spring 2027.

== Stations ==
Station	Japanese	Distance (km)	Transfers	Location	
Kisarazu	木更津	0.0	Uchibō Line	Kisarazu	Chiba Prefecture
Gion	祇園	2.6		Kisarazu	Chiba Prefecture
Kazusa-Kiyokawa	上総清川	4.2		Kisarazu	Chiba Prefecture
Higashi-Kiyokawa	東清川	6.1		Kisarazu	Chiba Prefecture
Yokota	横田	9.3		Sodegaura	Chiba Prefecture
Higashi-Yokota	東横田	10.8		Sodegaura	Chiba Prefecture
Makuta	馬来田	13.9		Kisarazu	Chiba Prefecture
Shimogōri	下郡	15.2		Kimitsu	Chiba Prefecture
Obitsu	小櫃	18.2		Kimitsu	Chiba Prefecture
Tawarada	俵田	20.0		Kimitsu	Chiba Prefecture
Kururi	久留里	22.6		Kimitsu	Chiba Prefecture
Hirayama	平山	25.7		Kimitsu	Chiba Prefecture
Kazusa-Matsuoka	上総松丘	28.3		Kimitsu	Chiba Prefecture
Kazusa-Kameyama	上総亀山	32.2		Kimitsu	Chiba Prefecture

== Rolling stock ==
Kururi Line services are operated by a fleet of 10 KiHa E130-100 DMU traincars which entered service on December 1, 2012.

Trains operate as 1, 2, or 3-car sets using one-man operation (ワンマン/"wanman"), with no conductor onboard.

=== Former rolling stock ===
- KiHa 30 DMU
- KiHa 37 DMU
- KiHa 38 DMU

== Services ==
All services on the Kururi Line are Local trains, stopping at every station.

Services between Kisarazu and Kururi operate approximately hourly, with a running time of around 45 minutes.

The outer section of the line between Kururi and Kazusa-Kameyama only received 9 up services and 8 down services each day, with a running time of 18 minutes. Trains only ran on this section during the morning and evening peaks, leaving large gaps between departures, up to 5½ hours in the afternoon.

== History ==
Map of line with stations location

The Chiba Prefectural Government opened the 762 mm (2 ft 6 in) gauge section from Kisarazu to Kururi as a light railway on 28 December 1912.

In 1922, the Railway Construction Act was amended by the Diet, and a new rail line connecting Kisarazu Station to Ōhara Station on the Sotobō Line via Kururi and Ōtaki, to transect the Bōsō Peninsula, appeared on the list as compensation for the underdeveloped network of roads in the area at that time.

On 1 September 1923, the Kisarazu to Kururi Line was nationalised, and the line was named the Kururi Line under the Japanese Government Railways (JGR) system. On 20 August 1930, the track gauge was widened to 1,067 mm (3 ft 6 in), and on 25 March 1936, the line was extended to Kazusa-Kameyama Station.

The private Kihara Line from Ōhara Station was extended to Kazusa-Nakano Station in 1934, and it was planned that the Kururi Line and the Kihara Line would be connected to form a single route across the Bōsō Peninsula (which would have been named the Kihara Line). However, due to World War II, the plan was abandoned, and Kururi Line was never to be extended into the most mountainous area of the peninsula. Services on the section from Kururi Station to Kazusa-Kameyama Station were suspended from 1944 to 1947.

New KiHa E130-100 series DMU trains were introduced from 1 December 2012, replacing the ageing KiHa 30/37/38 DMUs.

In February 2026, JR East announced the discontinuation of the final 3.6km of the line between Kururi and Kazusa-Kameyama stations, with final closure in April 2027. At the same time it was announced that the remaining section of the line would receive IC card support after the final sections closure.

In late September 2026, the line suffered damage due to a typhoon in Chiba prefecture, resulting in the closure of the entire line. The line was re-opened up to Kururi by early October,but the remaining section up to Kazusa-Kameyama was calculated to take up to half a year to reopen by JR East due to more extensive damage. The company then announced on 23 October that they will not be reopening the section.
