= Kazusa-Kameyama Station =

Railway station in Kimitsu, Chiba Prefecture, Japan

Kazusa-Kameyama Station 上総亀山駅
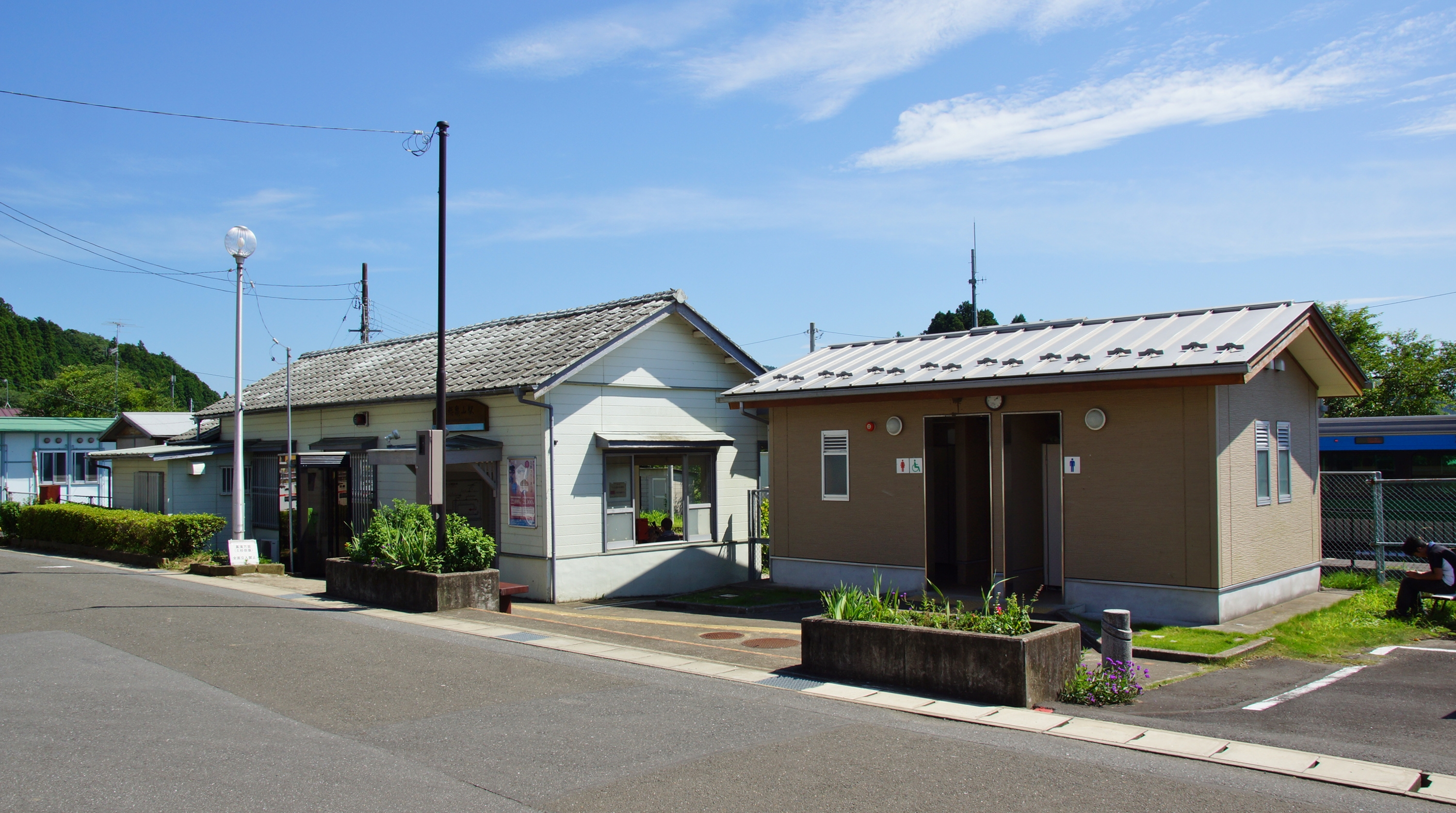
- Kazusa-Kameyama Station, July 2015

General information
- Location: Fujibayashi, Kimitsu-shi, Chiba-ken 292-0531; Japan
- Coordinates: 35°13′58.97″N 140°5′23.41″E
- Operator: JR East
- Line: ■ Kururi Line
- Distance: 32.2 km from Kisarazu
- Platforms: 1 island platform

Other information
- Status: Unstaffed
- Website: Official website

History
- Opened: March 25, 1936

Passengers
- FY2010: 90

Services
Preceding station	JR East	Following station
Kazusa-Matsuoka towards Kisarazu	Kururi Line	Terminus
Location
- Location within Chiba Prefecture Location within Japan

Kazusa-Kameyama Station (上総亀山駅, Kazusa-Kameyama-eki) is a passenger railway station in the city of Kimitsu, Chiba Prefecture, Japan, operated by the East Japan Railway Company (JR East).

== Lines ==
Kazusa-Kameyama Station is the eastern terminus of the Kururi Line, and is located 32.2 km from the opposing terminus of the line at Kisarazu Station.

== Station layout ==
Kazusa-Kameyama Station has a single island platform serving a single bidirectional track. Only the far side of the platform is used, and the side facing the station building is fenced off. The platform is accessed by a level crossing over the track.

=== Gallery ===
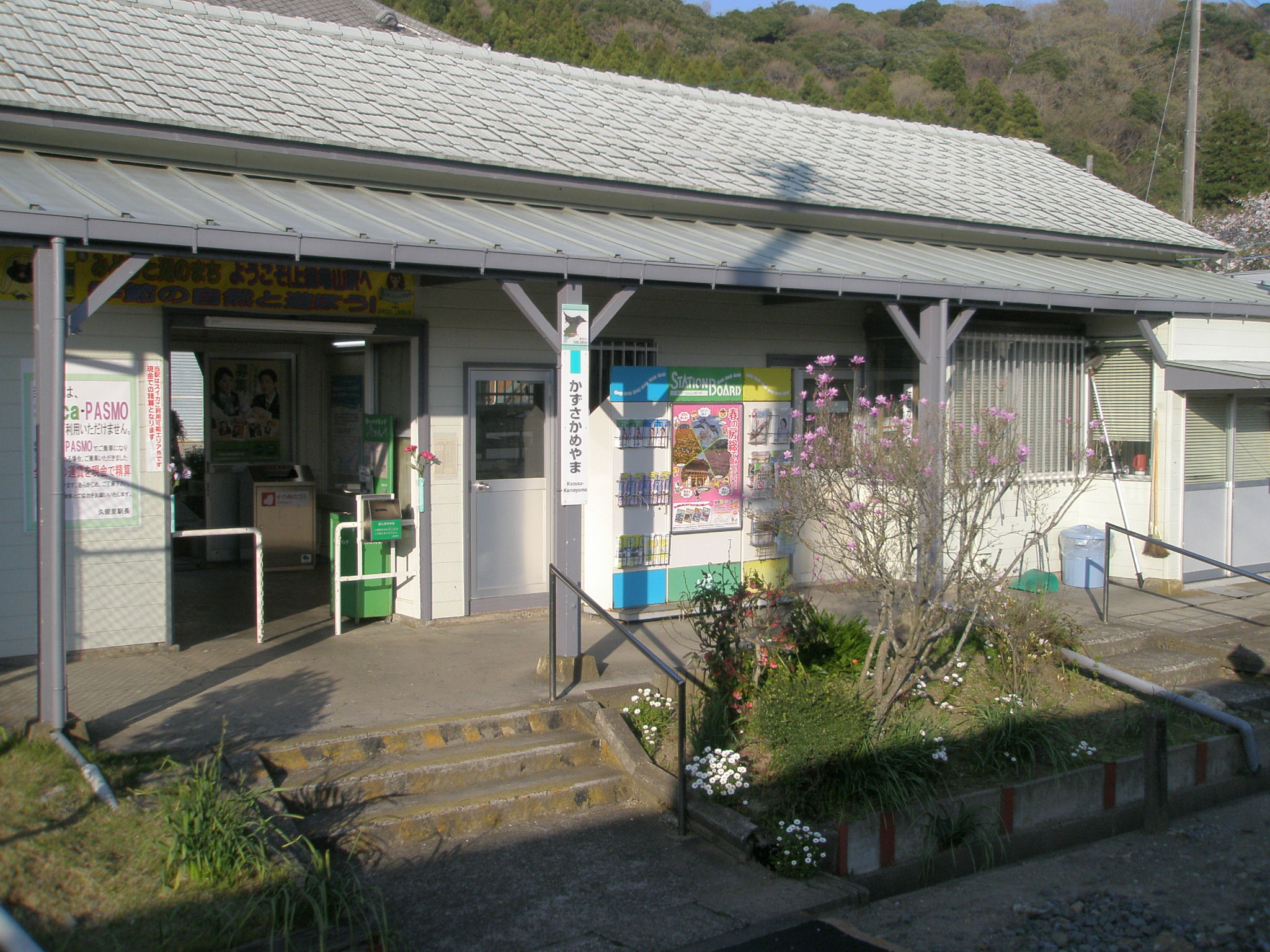
The station building viewed from the platform, April 2009

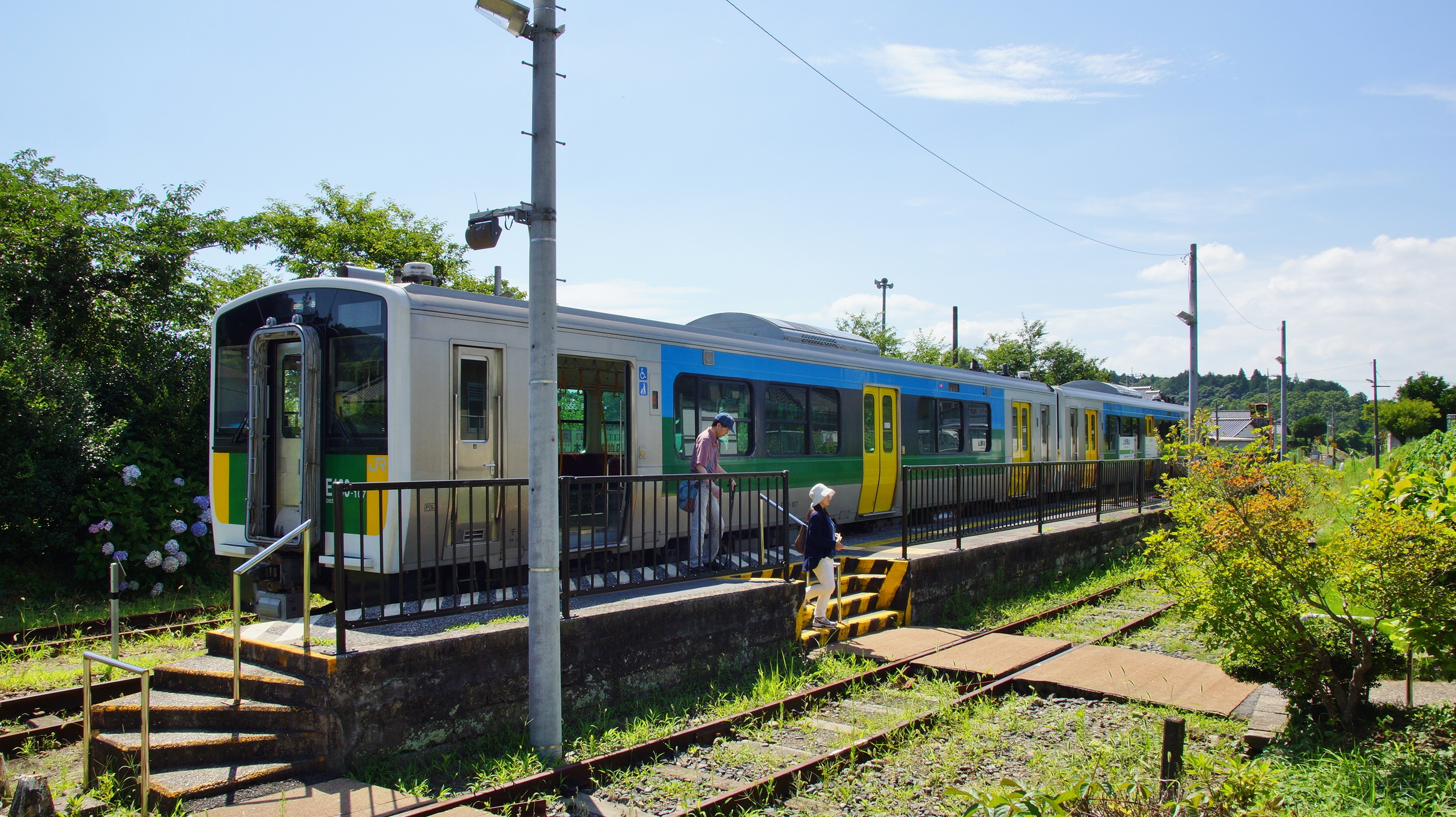
The platform, July 2015

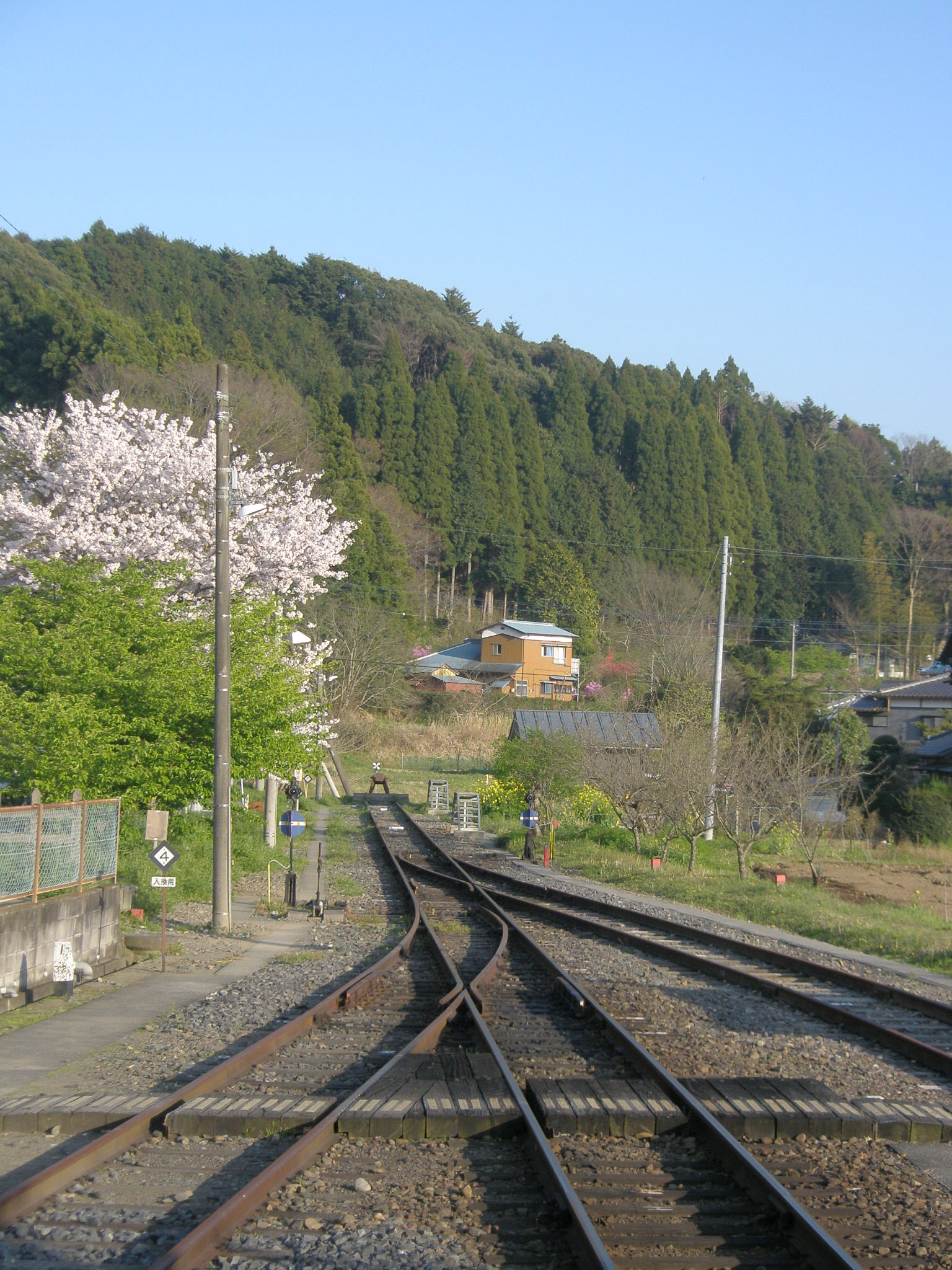
The view from the platform looking toward the end of the line, April 2009

== History ==
The station opened on March 25, 1936. It was closed from December 16, 1944 to April 1, 1947. With the privatization of JNR on April 1, 1987, the station came under the control of JR East.

== Passenger statistics ==
In fiscal 2010, the station was used by an average of 90 passengers daily (boarding passengers only).

== Bus routes ==
- Kameyama-Fujibayashioohashi bus stop
  - Kapina
    - For Awa-Kamogawa Station
    - For Chiba-Chuo Station
    - Kapina is operated by Chiba Chuo Bus and Nitto Kotsu
  - Aqusea
    - For Awa-Kamogawa Station
    - For Tokyo Station
    - Aqusea is operated by Keisei Bus and Nitto Kotsu

== Surrounding area ==
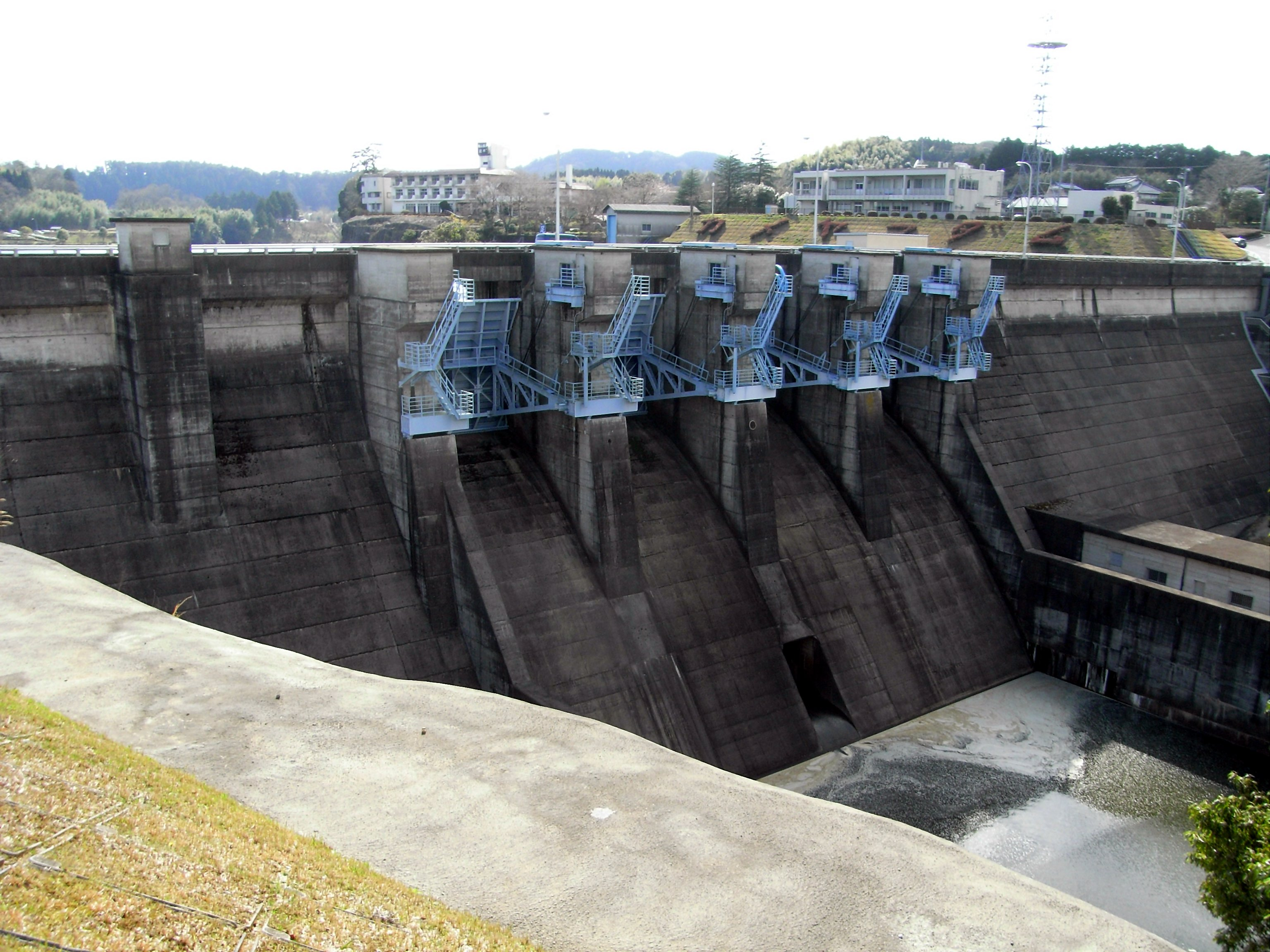
Kameyama Dam

- National Route 465
- Kameyama Dam
- Kameyama Onsen

== See also ==
- List of railway stations in Japan
