= Mount Saga =

Mountain in Japan

- 嵯峨山
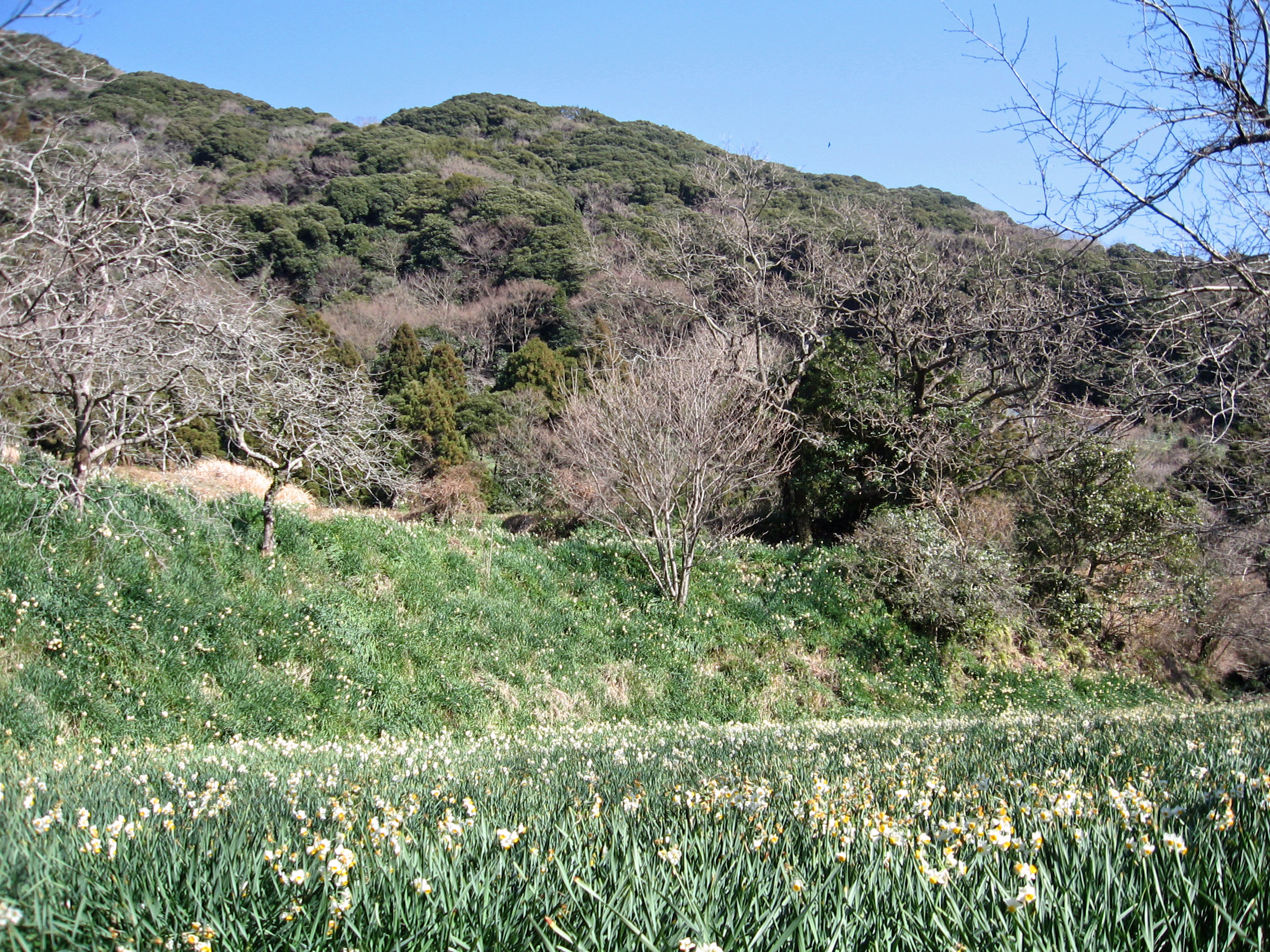
- Narcissus at Mount Saga

Highest point
- Elevation: 315.5 m (1,035 ft)
- Coordinates: 35°09′26″N 139°53′00″E

Naming
- Language of name: Japanese
- Pronunciation: Japanese: [saɡajama]

Geography
- Location within Japan
- Location: Chiba Prefecture
- Parent range: Bōsō Hill Range

Climbing
- Easiest route: Hiking

Mount Saga (嵯峨山, Saga-yama) is a mountain located on the border of Futtsu and Kyonan, Chiba Prefecture. Mount Saga has an elevation of 315.5 m (1,035 ft) and is one of the peaks of the Mineoka Mountain District of the Bōsō Hill Range.

== Narcissus cultivation ==
Mount Saga is home to one of the largest areas of narcissus flower cultivation in Japan. The flowers are grown in terraced plots along the slopes of the mountain, mostly those facing Kyonan. The plantings are primarily of the Nihon variety of narcissus, which probably originated in south China and came to Japan via the Kuroshio Current. Mount Saga has been used for narcissus cultivation from at least the Edo period 1603–1868. The daimyō Matsudaira Sadanobu (1759–1829), administrator of Shirakawa Domain in present-day Fukushima Prefecture, visited the area in 1811 and noted the mountain and its narcissus cultivation in his diary.

Cultivation has spread to the peak of Mount Saga. The Japanese word for narcissus is suisen, and the summit of Mount Saga is known as Suisen Peak. The mountain is a popular hiking destination from late December to early February when the narcissus bloom.

== Hiking routes ==
The peak of Mount Saga can be reached from either Futtsu or Kyonan.

- Kyonan–JR East's Uchibō Line Hota Station to Kyonan Chōei Bus, Kobota Stop. Suisen Peak is an hour and a half hike from the bus stop.
- Futtsu–Suisen Peak is an hour-and-a-half to two-hour hike from the Kyonan-Hota Interchange on the Futtsu Tateyama Road.
