= Japan National Route 465 =

National highway in Chiba Prefecture, Japan

National Route 465
- 国道465号
- National Route 465 highlighted in red

Route information
- Length: 111.0 km (69.0 mi)
- Existed: 1 April 1993–present

Major junctions
- East end: National Route 409 in Mobara
- National Route 128; National Route 297; National Route 410; National Route 127; Tateyama Expressway
- West end: National Route 16 in Futtsu

Location
- Country: Japan

Highway system
- National highways of Japan; Expressways of Japan
← National Route 464	→ National Route 466

National Route 465 (国道465号, Kokudō Yonhyaku roku-jūgogō) is a national highway located entirely within Chiba Prefecture, Japan. It connects the cities of Mobara and Futtsu, spanning the Bōsō Peninsula in an east–west routing. The highway has a total length of 111.0 kilometers (69.0 mi).

== Route description ==
National Route 465 connects the cities of Mobara and Futtsu, spanning Chiba Prefecture's Bōsō Peninsula in an east–west routing. The highway has a total length of 111.0 kilometers (69.0 mi), though the first 25.0 kilometers (15.5 mi) of the highway that runs concurrently with National Route 128, is not signed as National Route 465. The highway's eastern terminus lies at a junction with National Route 409 in Mobara, where it begins its concurrency with National Route 128. The two highways pass through the municipalities of Chōsei and Ichinomiya heading south towards the city of Isumi along the eastern coast of the peninsula.

In Isumi the highways diverge, with National Route 128 continuing south along the coast towards the southern tip of the peninsula and National Route 465 heading west towards its interior, paralleling the Isumi Line. Crossing into the mountainous town of Ōtaki, the highway meets National Route 297 just to the west of the town's central district. The two highways share a brief concurrency running south through the relatively dense area, after which National Route 465 continues west, paralleling the Isumi Line to the railway's terminus at Kazusa-Nakano Station.

Crossing into the city of Kimitsu, the highway continues winding its way west through the peninsula's mountainous interior. Near Kazusa-Kameyama Station the highway curves to the northwest and meets National Route 410 shortly after. The highways share another concurrency descending from the mountains, traveling though the narrow Yomachisaku Daiichi Tunnel, and then curving towards the southwest. The two routes diverge at the foot of Mount Kano. National Route 465 passes into the city of Futtsu directly to the south of the mountain. Just to the east of central Futtsu, the highway meets National Route 127, they share yet another concurrency traveling north together through central Futtsu towards the Tateyama Expressway. The aforementioned highways travel alongside each other for a brief period with Futtsu-chūō interchange linking them before the highways all separate within the vicinity of Sanukimachi Station. National Route 465 travels directly to that train station, paralleling the Uchibō Line to the highway's western terminus at a junction with National Route 16 on Cape Futtsu.

== History ==
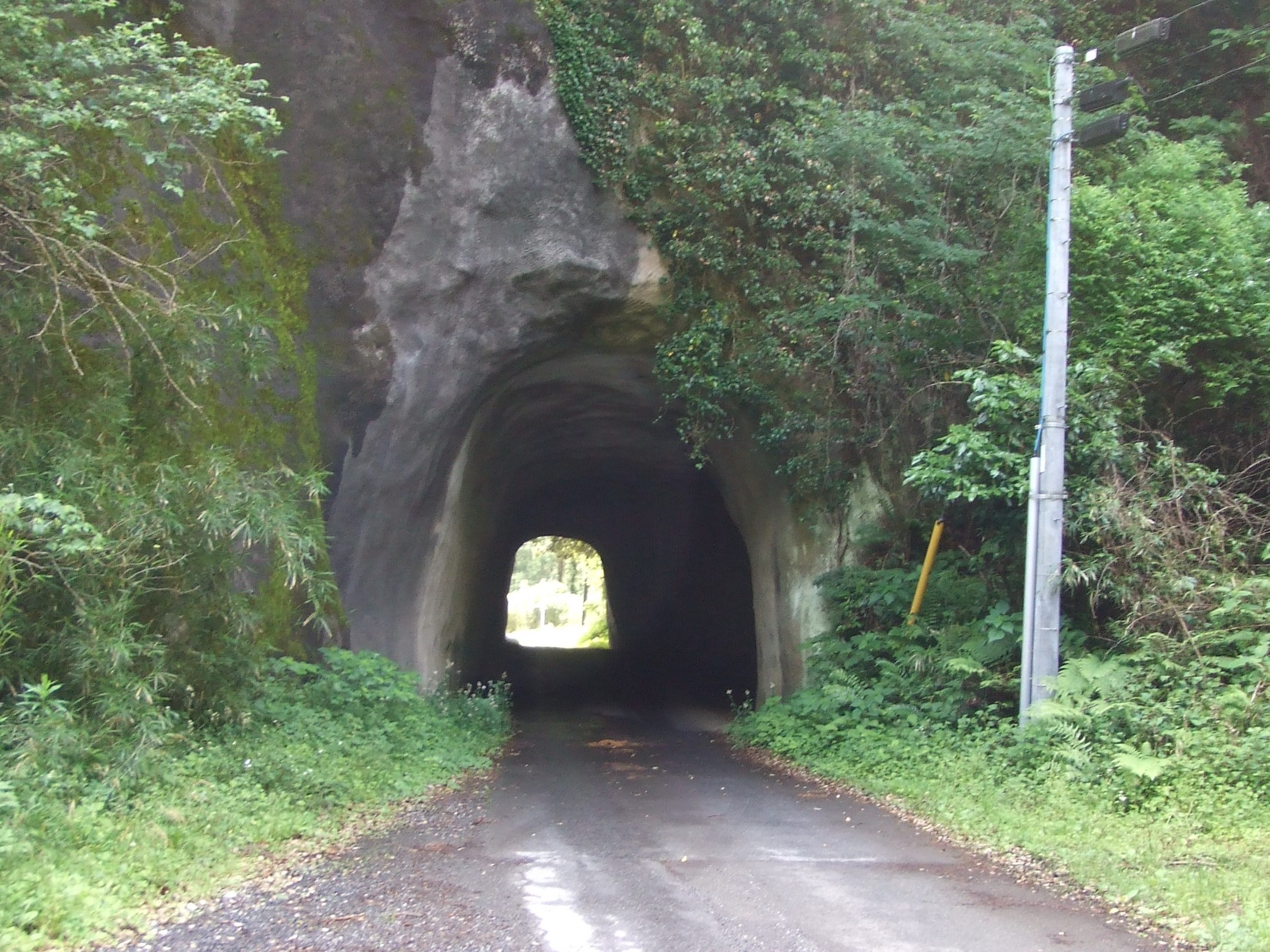
Yomachisaku Daiichi Tunnel

In 1902, the Yomachisaku Daiichi Tunnel (四町作第一隧道, Yomachisaku Daiichi Zuidō) was completed using only hand tools along what would become National Route 465 in the city of Kimitsu. The tunnel is the second oldest tunnel that is designated as a part of a national highway in Japan.

National Route 465 was established by the Cabinet of Japan in 1993. A re-aligning and widening project along the highway in the city of Kimitsu was completed on 31 March 2015. The project resolved problems created by several repetitive tight curves. The straightened roadway decreased the length of National Route 465 by 200 meters (660 ft). On 23 December 2015, a 20-meter-long (66 ft) section of the Yomachisaku Daiichi Tunnel's shotcrete lining collapsed following a re-application of the supportive lining a month prior to the collapse. The tunnel lining was repaired by the following day.

== Major intersections ==
The route lies entirely within Chiba Prefecture.

Location	km	mi	Destinations	Notes
Mobara	0.0	0.0	National Route 409 west – Kisarazu; Chiba Prefecture Route 27 south – Katsuura, Ōtaki	Eastern terminus; eastern end of National Route 409 concurrency, highway continues south as Chiba Prefecture Route 27
Mobara	0.2	0.12	National Route 128 north / National Route 409 east – Chiba, Tōgane	Western end of National Route 409 concurrency, eastern end of National Route 128 concurrency
Chōsei	4.8	3.0	Chiba Prefecture Route 85 south / Chiba Prefecture Route 293 west – Mutsuzawa	Eastern end of Chiba Prefecture Route 293 concurrency
Chōsei	6.0	3.7	Chiba Prefecture Route 293 north – Seibu Industrial Park	Western end of Chiba Prefecture Route 293 concurrency
Chōsei	6.9	4.3	Chiba Prefecture Route 227 north – Yatsumi Station	
Ichinomiya	9.2	5.7	Chiba Prefecture Route 123 – Ichinomiya Beach, Shirako	
Ichinomiya	9.8	6.1	Chiba Prefecture Route 148 west	No direct access to Chiba Prefecture Route 148, one-way street
Ichinomiya	9.9	6.2	Chiba Prefecture Route 228 east – Kazusa-Ichinomiya Station	
Ichinomiya	13.3	8.3	Chiba Prefecture Route 274 west – Matsumaru	
Ichinomiya	14.2	8.8	Chiba Prefecture Route 152 south – Misaki	
Ichinomiya	15.7	9.8	Chiba Prefecture Route 30 north – to Kujūkuri Toll Road, Kujūkuri	
Isumi	18.4	11.4	Chiba Prefecture Route 229 west – Taitō Station	
Isumi	20.7	12.9	Chiba Prefecture Route 152 north – Misaki	
Isumi	24.3	15.1	National Route 465 west (Fukahori Bypass) – Ōtaki	
Isumi	25.2	15.7	National Route 128 south – Katsuura, Onjuku	Western end of National Route 128 concurrency
Isumi	26.9	16.7	National Route 465 east (Fukahori Bypass) – to National Route 128	
Isumi	31.3	19.4	Chiba Prefecture Route 176 – Yamada, Onjuku	
Isumi	34.1	21.2	Chiba Prefecture Route 154 east – Misaki	
Isumi	35.0	21.7	Chiba Prefecture Route 85 north – Mobara	
Isumi	37.1	23.1	Chiba Prefecture Route 82 south – Kominato, Katsuura	
Isumi	37.6	23.4	Chiba Prefecture Route 151 north – Mutsuzawa	
Ōtaki	40.5	25.2	National Route 297 north (Ōtaki-Kaidō) – to Ken-Ō Expressway, Ichihara, Chiba; Chiba Prefecture Route 172 west – Central Ōtaki	Eastern end of National Route 297 concurrency
Ōtaki	42.0	26.1	Chiba Prefecture Route 231 north – Central Ōtaki, Ōtaki Prefectural Forest	
Ōtaki	42.4	26.3	National Route 297 south (Ōtaki-Kaidō) – Kamogawa, Katsuura	Western end of National Route 297 concurrency
Ōtaki	51.1	31.8	Chiba Prefecture Route 177 south – Kominato, Katsuura	
Ōtaki	51.6	32.1	Chiba Prefecture Route 32 west – Kururi	
Ōtaki	54.8	34.1	Chiba Prefecture Route 81 north – Chiba, Yōrō Keikoku; Chiba Prefecture Route 178 south – Okitsu, Mamenbara	Eastern end of Chiba Prefecture Route 81 concurrency
Kimitsu	59.0	36.7	Chiba Prefecture Route 81 south – Kamogawa, Kiyosumi	Western end of Chiba Prefecture Route 81 concurrency
Kimitsu	67.4	41.9	Chiba Prefecture Route 24 south (Kururi Kaidō) – Kamogawa	Eastern end of Chiba Prefecture Route 24 concurrency
Kimitsu	68.0	42.3	National Route 410 north / Chiba Prefecture Route 24 north (Kururi Kaidō)	Eastern end of National Route 410 concurrency, western end of Chiba Prefecture Route 24 concurrency
Kimitsu	76.6	47.6	National Route 410 south – Tateyama, Seiwa Prefectural Forest	Western end of National Route 410 concurrency
Kimitsu	81.7	50.8	Chiba Prefecture Route 92 / Chiba Prefecture Route 93 east (Bōsō Skyline) – to Tokyo Bay Aqua-Line, Kamogawa	Eastern end of Chiba Prefecture Route 93 concurrency
Kimitsu	82.5	51.3	Chiba Prefecture Route 93 west – Mount Kano	Western end of Chiba Prefecture Route 93 concurrency
Futtsu	92.7	57.6	Chiba Prefecture Route 182 south (Momiji Road) – Hota	
Futtsu	95.6	59.4	Chiba Prefecture Route 93 east – Mount Kano	Eastern end of Chiba Prefecture Route 93 concurrency
Futtsu	96.1	59.7	Chiba Prefecture Route 93 west – to National Route 127, Kazusaminato	Western end of Chiba Prefecture Route 93 concurrency
Futtsu	98.2	61.0	National Route 127 south (Uchibō Nagisa Line) – Tateyama, Hamakanaya	Eastern end of National Route 127 concurrency
Futtsu	99.9	62.1	Tateyama Expressway – to Tokyo Bay Aqua-Line, Chiba, Kawasaki, Tateyama	Futtsu-chūō Interchange (E14 exit 19)
Futtsu	101.2	62.9	National Route 127 north (Uchibō Nagisa Line) – Chiba, Kisarazu; Chiba Prefecture Route 163 east – to Bōsō Skyline, Mount Kano	Western end of National Route 127 concurrency, eastern end of Chiba Prefecture Route 163 concurrency
Futtsu	102.0	63.4	Chiba Prefecture Route 163 ends Chiba Prefecture Route 256 south – Shinmaiko Beach	Western end of Chiba Prefecture Route 163 concurrency
Futtsu	105.8	65.7	National Route 465 north (Uchibō Bypass) – Kimitsu	
Futtsu	110.2	68.5	Chiba Prefecture Route 255 west – Cape Futtsu	
Futtsu	111.0	69.0	National Route 16 – Cape Futtsu, Kisarazu; Chiba Prefecture Route 90 – to Tateyama Expressway, Chiba, Kisarazu	Western terminus; highway continues north as Chiba Prefecture Route 90
1.000 mi = 1.609 km; 1.000 km = 0.621 mi: Concurrency terminus; Incomplete access; Route transition
