= E14 =

E14, E-14, E.14 or E 14 may refer to:

== Military ==
- HMS E14, a British Royal Navy submarine which saw service during World War I
- Yokosuka E14Y, an Imperial Japanese Navy seaplane which saw service during World War II
- E 14 (Norway), a section within the Norwegian Intelligence Service specializing on covert missions abroad

== Transportation ==
- European route E14, a road which runs through Norway and Sweden
- E14, a postcode district in the E postcode area
- LSWR E14 class, a locomotive operated by the London and South Western Railway in the United Kingdom
- Keiyō Road, Tateyama Expressway and Futtsu-Tateyama Road, route E14 in Japan
- Johor Bahru Eastern Dispersal Link Expressway, road in Malaysia

== Other uses ==
- Queen's Indian Defence, Encyclopaedia of Chess Openings code
- E14 screw, a type of Edison screw fitting for light bulbs
- E-14 The New MIT Media Lab
