= Ōnuki Station =

Railway station in Futtsu, Chiba Prefecture, Japan

Ōnuki Station 大貫駅
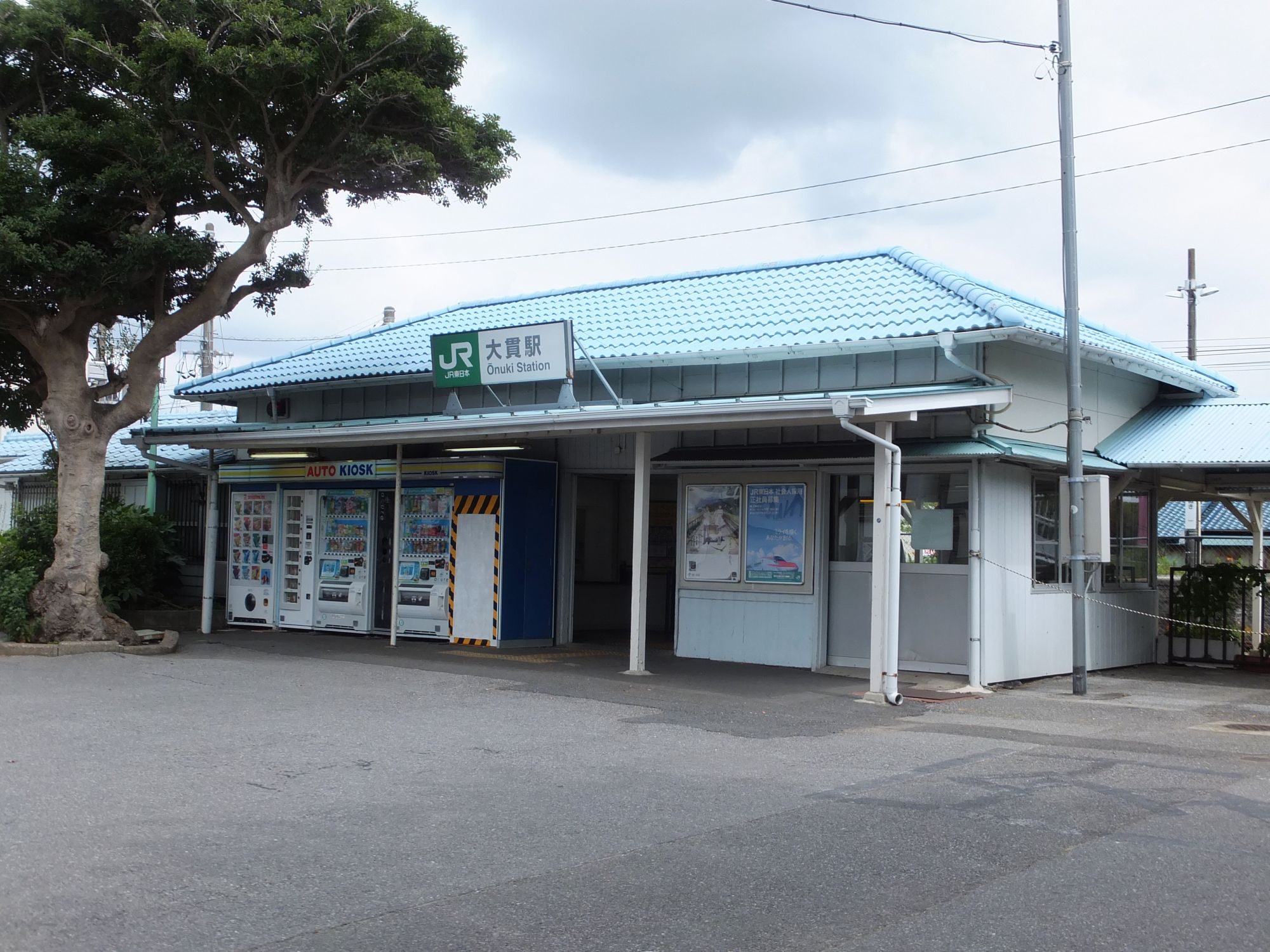
- Ōnuki Station in 2017

General information
- Location: Chigusashinden 364-3, Futtsu-shi, Chiba-ken 293-0036; Japan
- Coordinates: 35°17′27.7″N 139°51′20.3″E
- Operator: JR East
- Line: ■ Uchibō Line
- Distance: 46.6 km from Soga
- Platforms: 1 island platform

Other information
- Status: Staffed
- Website: Official website

History
- Opened: January 15, 1915

Passengers
- FY2019: 989

Services
Preceding station	JR East	Following station
Aohori towards Chiba	Uchibō Line Keiyō Rapid	Sanukimachi towards Kazusa-Minato
Aohori towards Soga or Chiba	Uchibō Line Local	Sanukimachi towards Awa-Kamogawa
Location
- Location within Chiba Prefecture Location within Japan

Ōnuki Station (大貫駅, Ōnuki-eki) is a passenger railway station in the city of Futtsu, Chiba Prefecture, Japan, operated by the East Japan Railway Company (JR East).

== Lines ==
Ōnuki Station is served by the Uchibo Line, and is located 46.6 km from the starting point of the line at Soga Station.

== Layout ==
The station consists of a single island platform serving two tracks, connected to the station building by a footbridge. The station is staffed.

=== Platforms ===
1	■ Uchibō Line	For Kimitsu, Kisarazu, Chiba
2	■ Uchibō Line	For Tateyama, Awa-Kamogawa

== History ==
Ōnuki Station was opened on January 15, 1915. The station was absorbed into the JR East network upon the privatization of the Japan National Railways (JNR) on April 1, 1987.

== Passenger statistics ==
In fiscal 2019, the station was used by an average of 989 passengers daily (boarding passengers only).

== Surrounding area ==
- Futtsu Post Office
- National Route 465

== See also ==
- List of railway stations in Japan
