= Ōnuki =

Ōnuki (大貫) is a Japanese surname. Notable people with the surname include:

- Ami Onuki (大貫 亜美, born 1973), Japanese pop singer
- Haru Onuki (1894–1965), American singer
- Minako Onuki (大貫 美奈子, born 1972), Japanese volleyball player
- Shinji Onuki (大貫 慎二, born 1962), Japanese rugby union player
- Taeko Onuki (大貫 妙子, born 1953), Japanese singer and songwriter
- Yasuko Onuki (大貫 靖子, born 1972), Japanese singer

== Fictional characters ==
- Ami Onuki, a character in the Japanese-American animated television series Hi Hi Puffy AmiYumi, based on the Japanese pop singer by the same name
- Keiko Onuki, a character in the Battle Royale manga series

== See also ==
- Ōnuki Station, railway station located in Futtsu, Chiba Prefecture, Japan
