= Nokogiriyama Ropeway =

Japanese cable line

Coordinates: 35°9′29.5″N 139°49′42.7″E

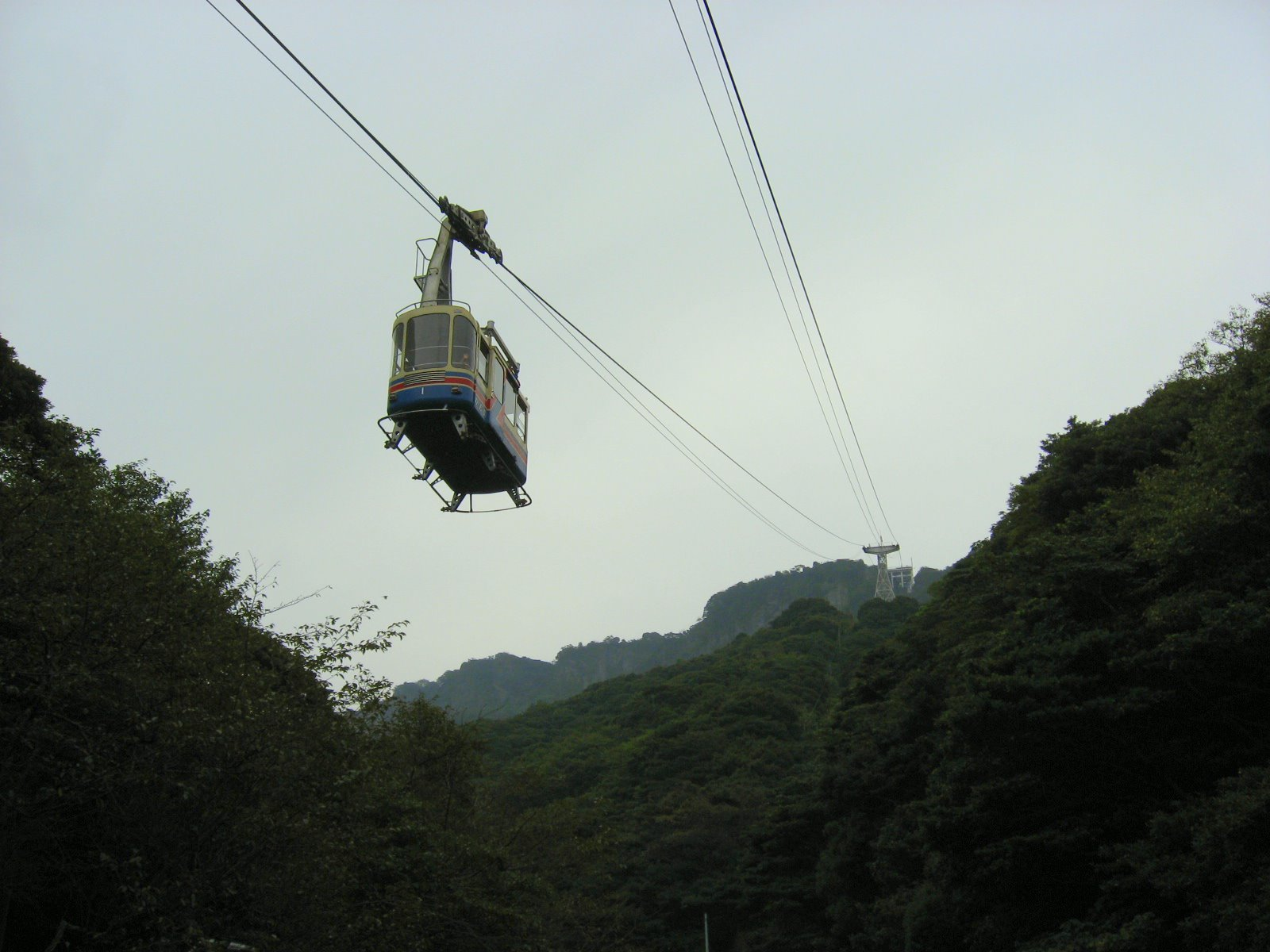
- Interactive map of Nokogiriyama Ropeway

Overview
- Status: Operational
- Character: Aerial tramway
- Location: Mount Nokogiri, Japan
- No. of stations: 2
- Open: 1962

Operation
- Operator: Keisei Electric Railway
- Carrier capacity: 41 Passengers per cabin
- Trip duration: 3 min

Technical features
- Line length: 680 m (2,231 ft)
- No. of cables: 3
- Vertical Interval: 223 m (732 ft)
- Maximum Gradient: 28°

The Nokogiriyama Ropeway in use, 2022

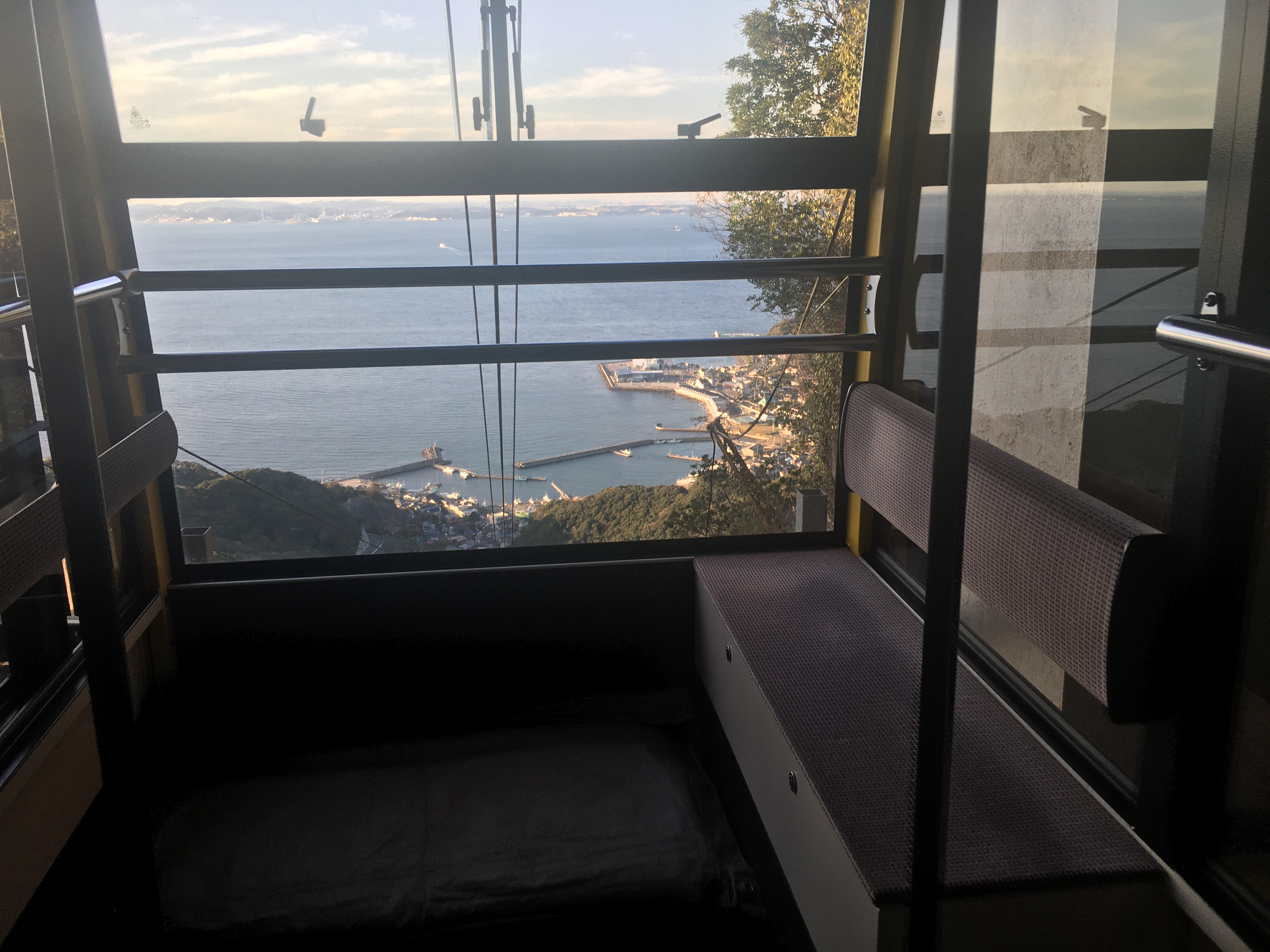
The view from inside a ropeway cabin.

The Nokogiriyama Ropeway (鋸山ロープウェー, Nokogiri-yama Rōpuwē) is an aerial lift line and operator in Japan. The line climbs Mount Nokogiri (Nokogiri-yama) from the outer Tokyo Bay coast in Futtsu, Chiba. It opened in 1962. Nokogiriyama Ropeway Company belongs to Keisei Group.

== Outline ==
=== Chronicle ===
- on 21 December 1962:The ropeway opened

== Stations ==
No	Name	Japanese	Distance	Elevation	Transfers
	Nokogiriyama Sanroku Station	鋸山山麓駅	0m	106m	Hamakanaya Station (Uchibo Line)/ Kanaya Port (Tokyo-Wan Ferry)
	Nokogiriyama Sancho Station	鋸山山頂駅	680m	329m	

== Basic data ==
- Distance: 680 m (2,231 ft)
- Vertical interval: 223 m (732 ft)

== Access ==
By public transport: From Chiba Station, take a JR East Uchibo Line train to Hama-Kanaya Station (trains operate approximately once per hour, with a travel time of 85 minutes). From Hama-Kanaya Station it is a 700 metres (2,300 ft), 8-10 minute walk to the ropeway base station.

If travelling from central Tokyo, take the Sōbu Line (Rapid) train from Tokyo Station to Chiba Station (trains operate every 10-15 minutes, with a travel time of 40 minutes), then take the Uchibo Line as shown above.

== See also ==
- List of aerial lifts in Japan
