= Takeoka Station =

Railway station in Futtsu, Chiba Prefecture, Japan

Takeoka Station 竹岡駅
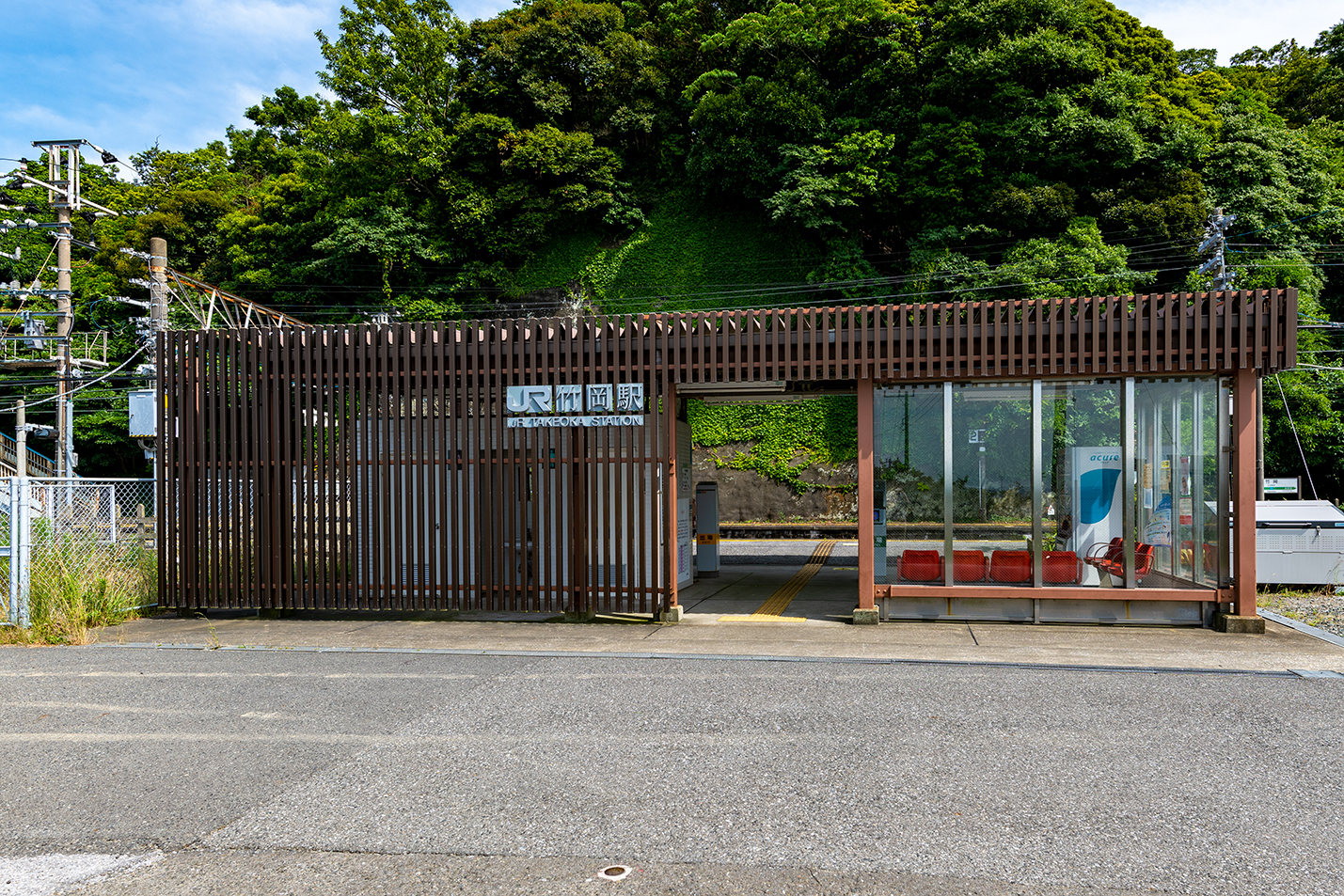

General information
- Location: Hagiu 2209, Futtsu-shi, Chiba-ken 299-1622; Japan
- Coordinates: 35.1976°N 139.8298°E
- Operator: JR East
- Line: ■ Uchibō Line
- Distance: 60.2 km from Soga
- Platforms: 2 side platforms

Other information
- Status: Unstaffed
- Website: Official website

History
- Opened: June 16, 1916

Passengers
- FY2006: 64

Services
Preceding station	JR East	Following station
Kazusa-Minato towards Soga or Chiba	Uchibō Line Local	Hamakanaya towards Awa-Kamogawa
Location
- Location within Chiba Prefecture Location within Japan

Takeoka Station (竹岡駅, Takeoka-eki) is a railway station is a passenger railway station in the city of Futtsu, Chiba Prefecture, Japan, operated by the East Japan Railway Company (JR East).

== Lines ==
Takeoka Station is served by the Uchibo Line, and is located 60.2 km from the starting point of the line at Soga Station.

== Layout ==
Takeoka Station has two opposed side platforms serving two tracks, connected by a footbridge. The station is unattended.

=== Platforms ===
1	■ Uchibō Line	For Kimitsu, Kisarazu, Chiba
2	■ Uchibō Line	For Tateyama, Awa-Kamogawa

== History ==
Takeoka Station was opened on June 16, 1916. The station was absorbed into the JR East network upon the privatization of the Japan National Railways (JNR) on April 1, 1987. The station building was reconstructed in February 2007.

== Passenger statistics ==
In fiscal 2006, the station was used by an average of 64 passengers daily

== Surrounding area ==
- Takeoka Elementary School
- National Route 127

== See also ==
- List of railway stations in Japan
