= Aohori Station =

Railway station in Futtsu, Chiba Prefecture, Japan

Aohori Station 青堀駅
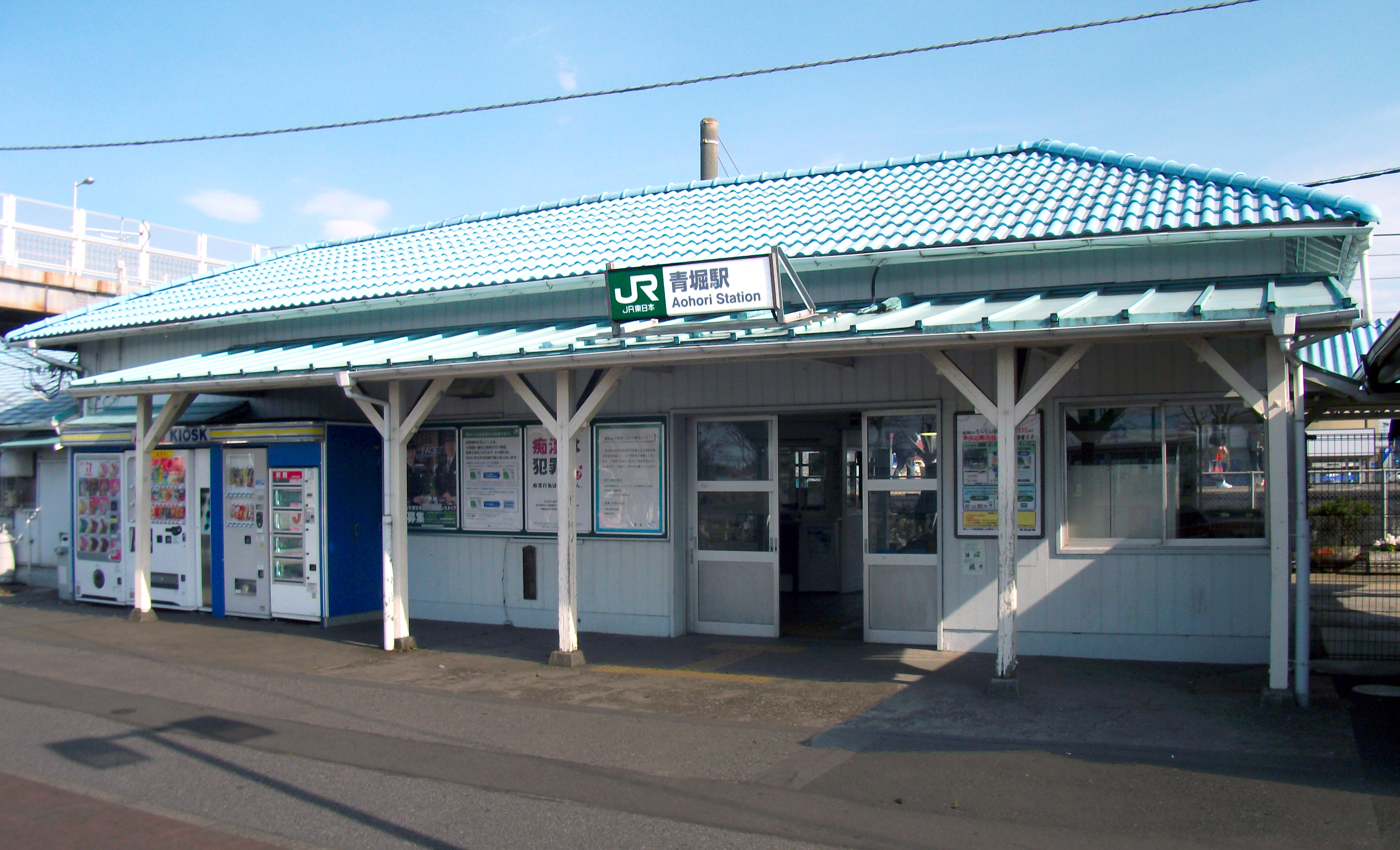
- Aohori Station in March 2012

General information
- Location: Ōhori 1884, Futtsu-shi, Chiba-ken 293-0001; Japan
- Coordinates: 35.3304°N 139.8581°E
- Operator: JR East
- Line: ■ Uchibō Line
- Distance: 43.0 km from Soga
- Platforms: 1 island platform

Other information
- Status: Staffed
- Website: Official website

History
- Opened: January 15, 1915

Passengers
- FY2019: 1473

Services
Preceding station	JR East	Following station
Kimitsu towards Chiba	Uchibō Line Keiyō Rapid	Ōnuki towards Kazusa-Minato
Kimitsu towards Soga or Chiba	Uchibō Line Local	Ōnuki towards Awa-Kamogawa
Location
- Location within Chiba Prefecture Location within Japan

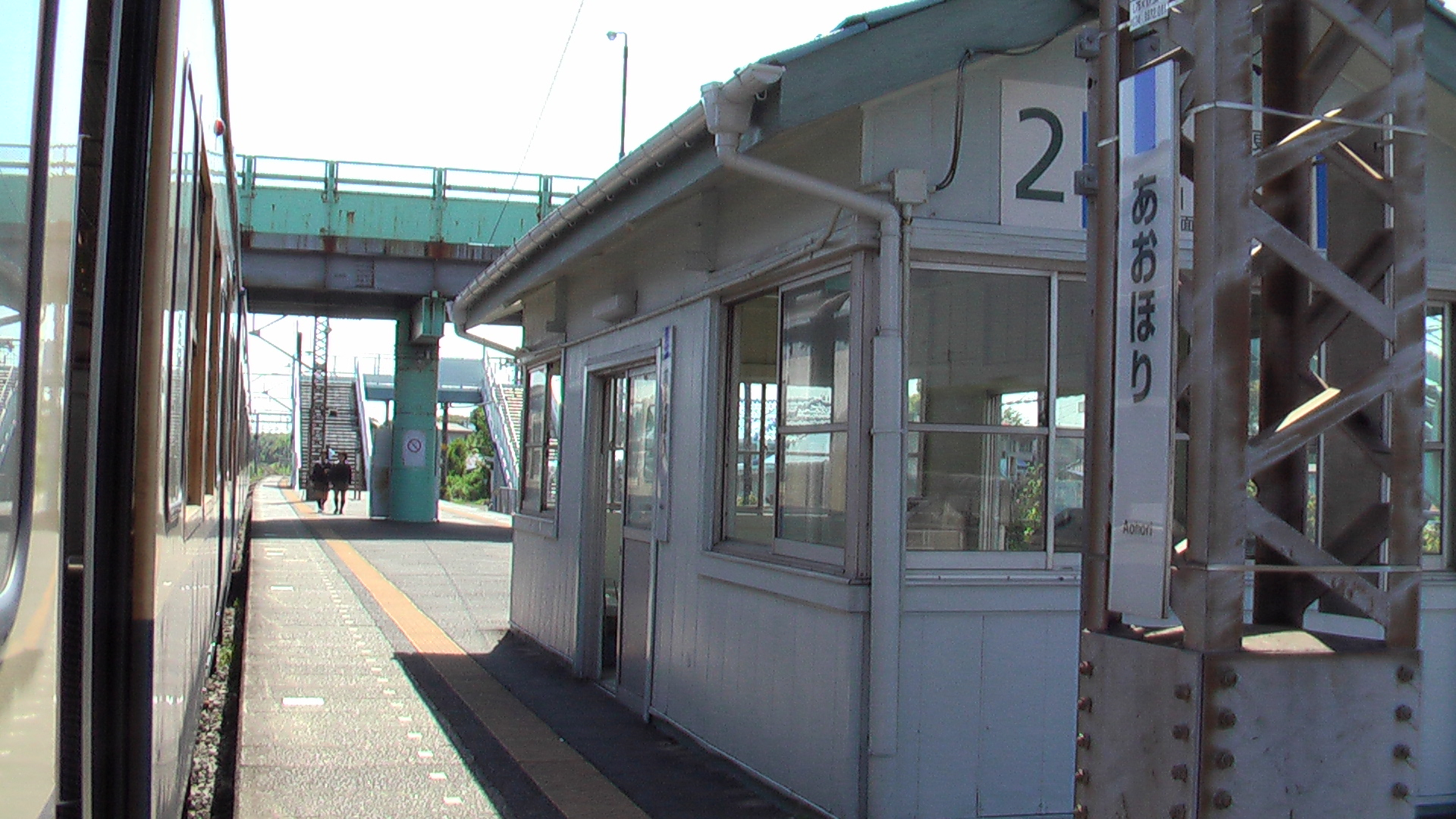
View of the station platforms

Aohori Station (青堀駅, Aohori-eki) is a passenger railway station in the city of Futtsu, Chiba Prefecture, Japan, operated by the East Japan Railway Company (JR East).

== Lines ==
Aohori Station is served by the Uchibo Line, and is located 43.0 km from the starting point of the line at Soga Station. 43.0 kilometers from the terminus of the Uchibō Line at Soga Station.

== Layout ==
The station consists of a single island platform serving two tracks, connected to the station building by a footbridge. The station is staffed.

=== Platforms ===
1	■ Uchibō Line	For Kimitsu, Kisarazu, Chiba
2	■ Uchibō Line	For Tateyama, Awa-Kamogawa

== History ==
Aohori Station was opened on January 15, 1915 as a station on the Japanese Government Railways (JGR) Kisarazu Line. On May 24, 1919, the line's name changed to the Hōjō Line, and on April 15, 1929, to the Bōsō Line and on April 1, 1933, to the Bōsōnishi Line. It became part of the Japan National Railways (JNR) after World War II, and the line was renamed the Uchibō Line from July 15, 1972. Aohori Station was absorbed into the JR East network upon the privatization of the Japan National Railways (JNR) on April 1, 1987.

== Passenger statistics ==
In fiscal 2019, the station was used by an average of 1473 passengers daily (boarding passengers only).

== Surrounding area ==
- Ino Elementary School
- National Route 16

== See also ==
- List of railway stations in Japan
