= Huttu =

There are several places named Huttu:

- A town in Finland (Huttu, Finland)
- The Kunrei-shiki spelling for the city of Futtsu, in Chiba, Japan.
