= Awa-Katsuyama Station =

Railway station in Kyonan, Chiba Prefecture, Japan

Awa-Katsuyama Station 安房勝山駅
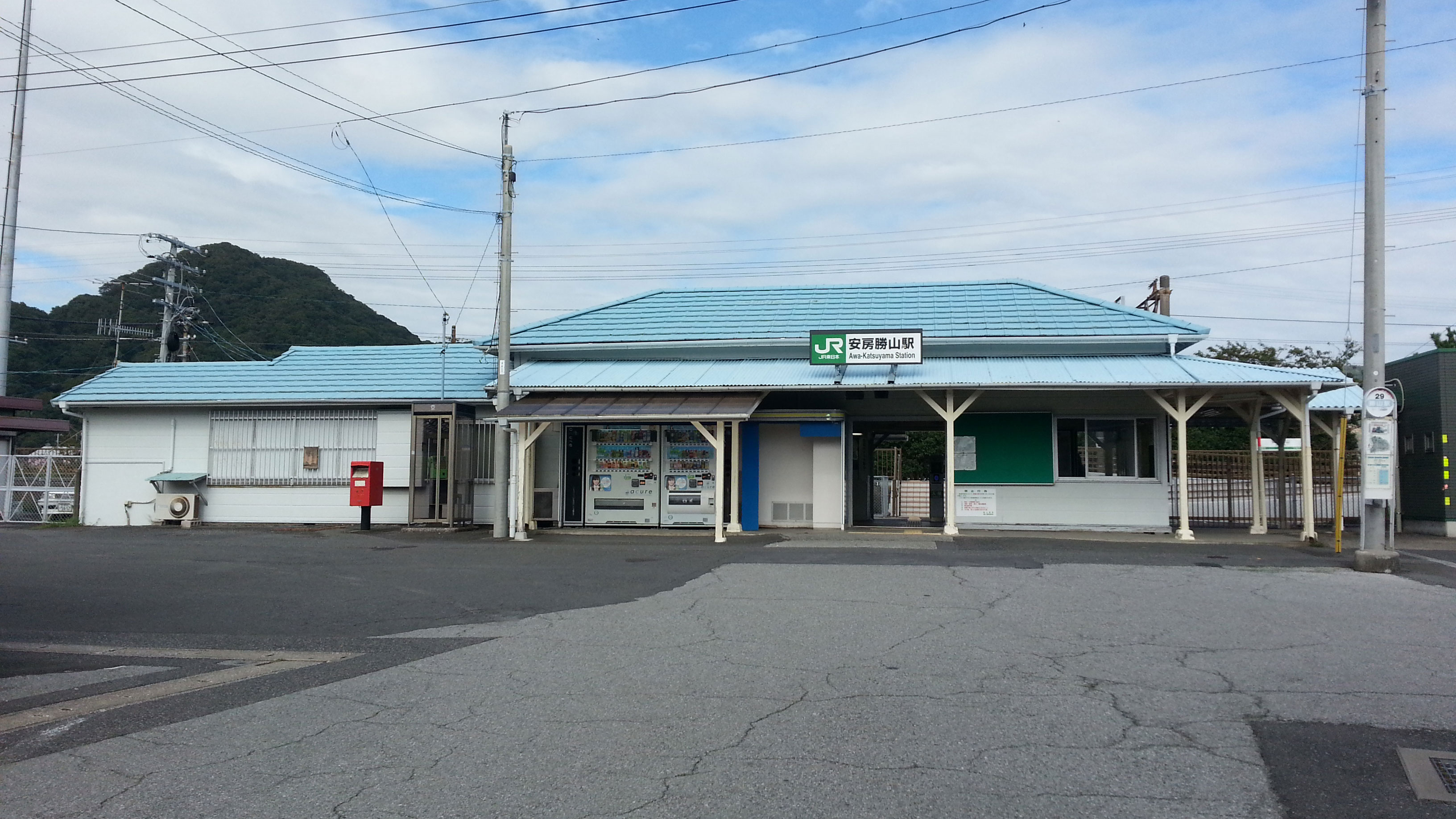
- Awa-Katsuyama Station in September 2016

General information
- Location: 838 Ryushima, Kyonan-machi, Awa-gun, Chiba-ken 299-2118; Japan
- Coordinates: 35.1139°N 139.8332°E
- Operator: JR East
- Line: ■ Uchibo Line
- Distance: 70.9 km from Soga
- Platforms: 1 side platform
- Tracks: 1
- Connections: Bus stop

Other information
- Status: Unstaffed
- Website: www.jreast.co.jp/estation/station/info.aspx?StationCd=91

History
- Opened: 1 August 1917

Passengers
- FY2018: 287 daily

Services
Preceding station	JR East	Following station
Hota towards Soga or Chiba	Uchibō Line Local	Iwai towards Awa-Kamogawa
Location
- Location within Chiba Prefecture Location within Japan

Awa-Katsuyama Station (安房勝山駅, Awa-Katsuyama-eki) is a passenger railway station in the town of Kyonan, Awa District, Chiba Prefecture, Japan, operated by East Japan Railway Company (JR East).

== Lines ==
Awa-Katsuyama Station is served by the Uchibo Line, and lies 70.9 km from the starting point of the line at Soga.

== Station layout ==
The station consists of a single island platform one track, with one side of the platform fenced off. The station is unattended.

=== Platforms ===
■ Uchibo Line	for Kimitsu, Kisarazu, and Chiba for Tateyama and Awa-Kamogawa

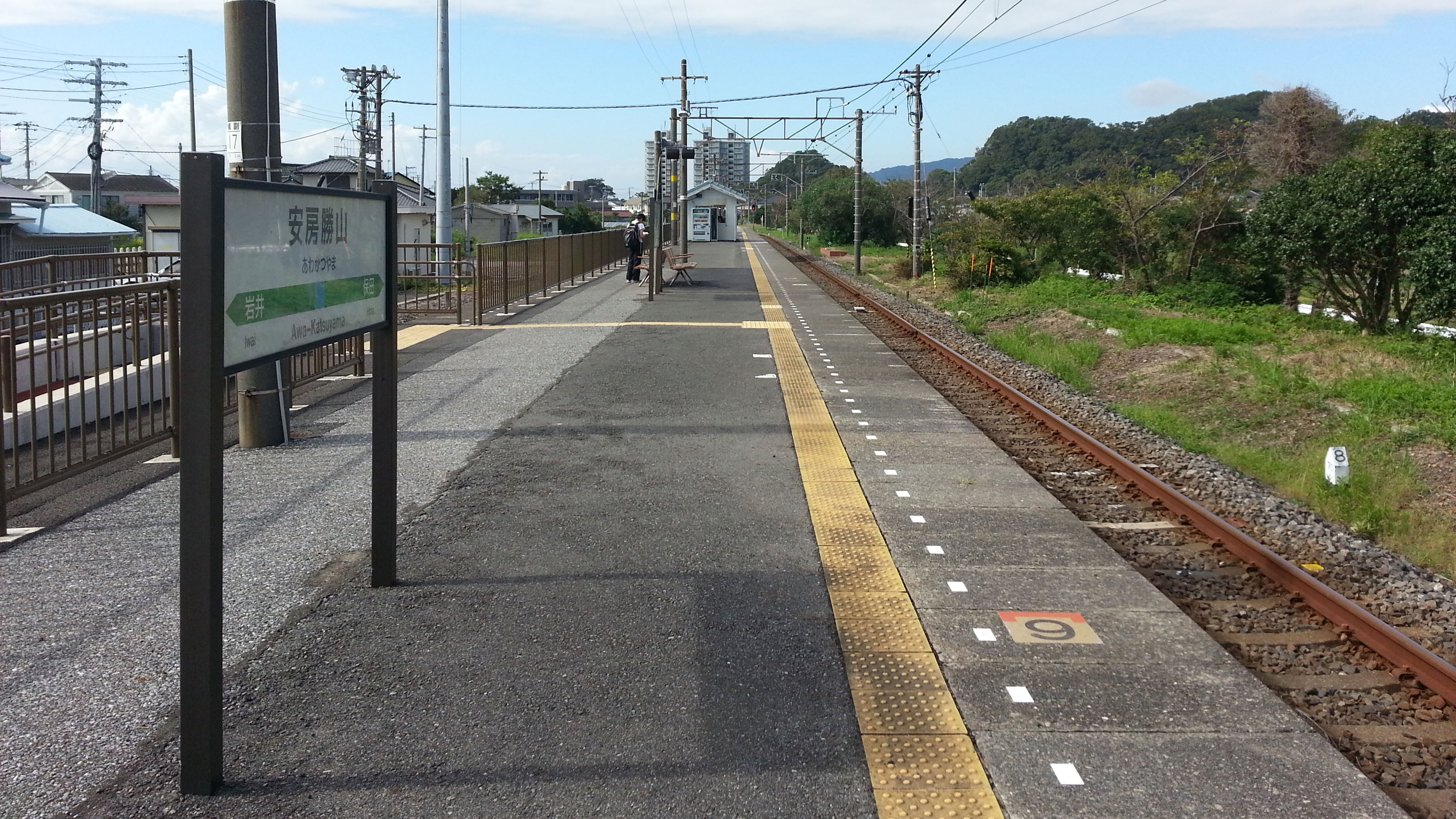
The platform in September 2016

== History ==
Awa-Katsuyama Station opened on August 1, 1917. The station was absorbed into the JR East network upon the privatization of the Japanese National Railways (JNR) on April 1, 1987.

== Passenger statistics ==
In fiscal 2018, the station was used by an average of 287 passengers daily (boarding passengers only).

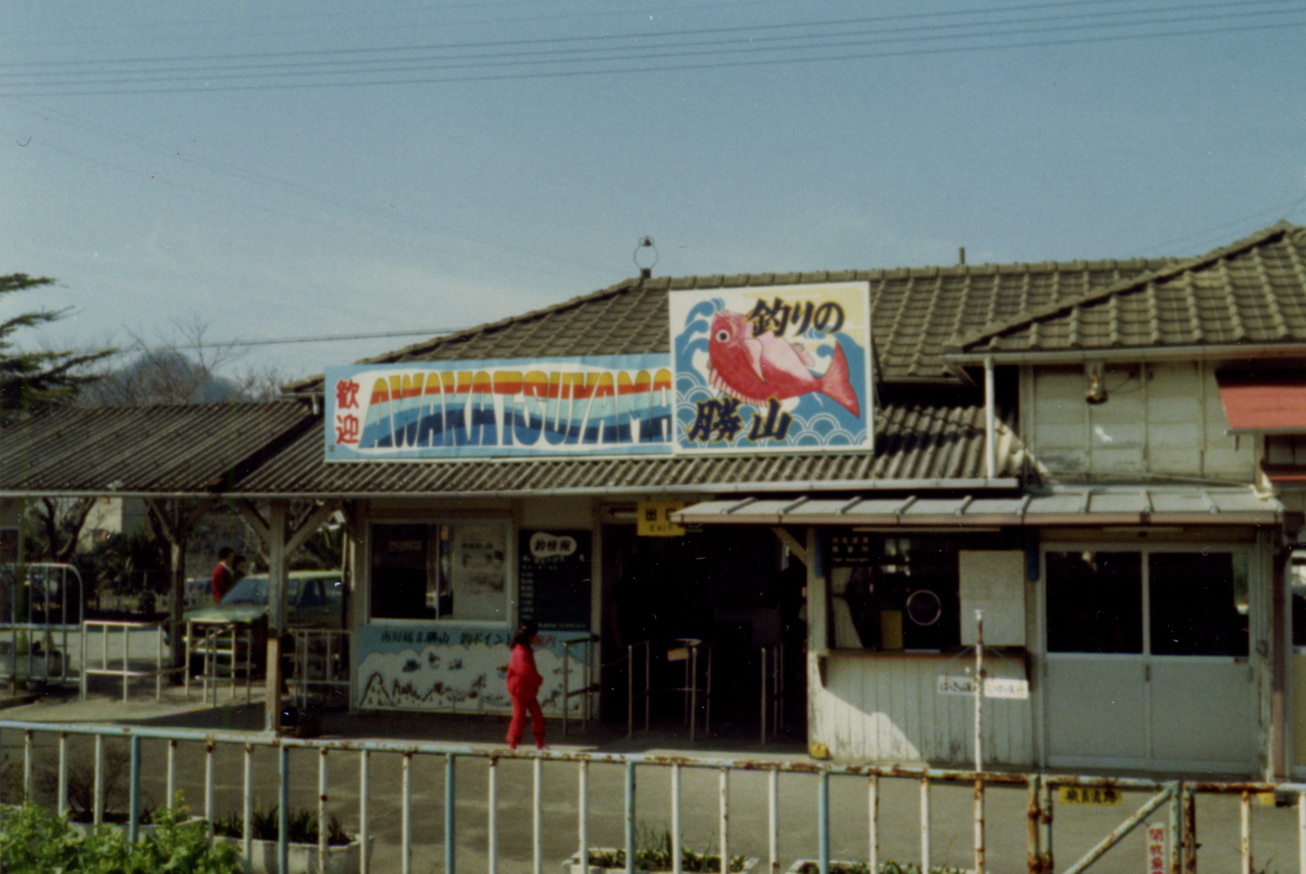
The station building viewed from the platform side in 1983

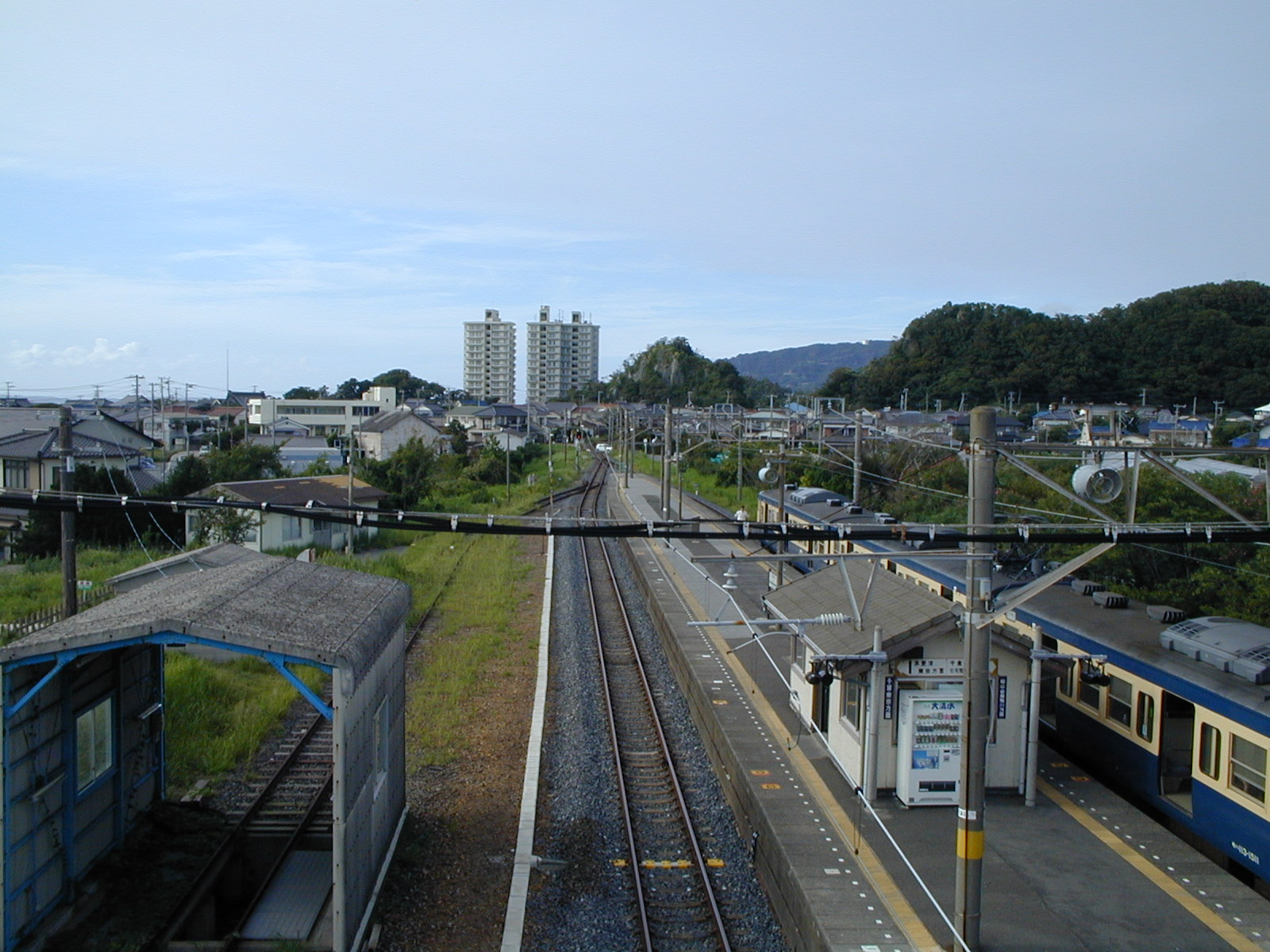
The platforms in 2000, with both sides in use

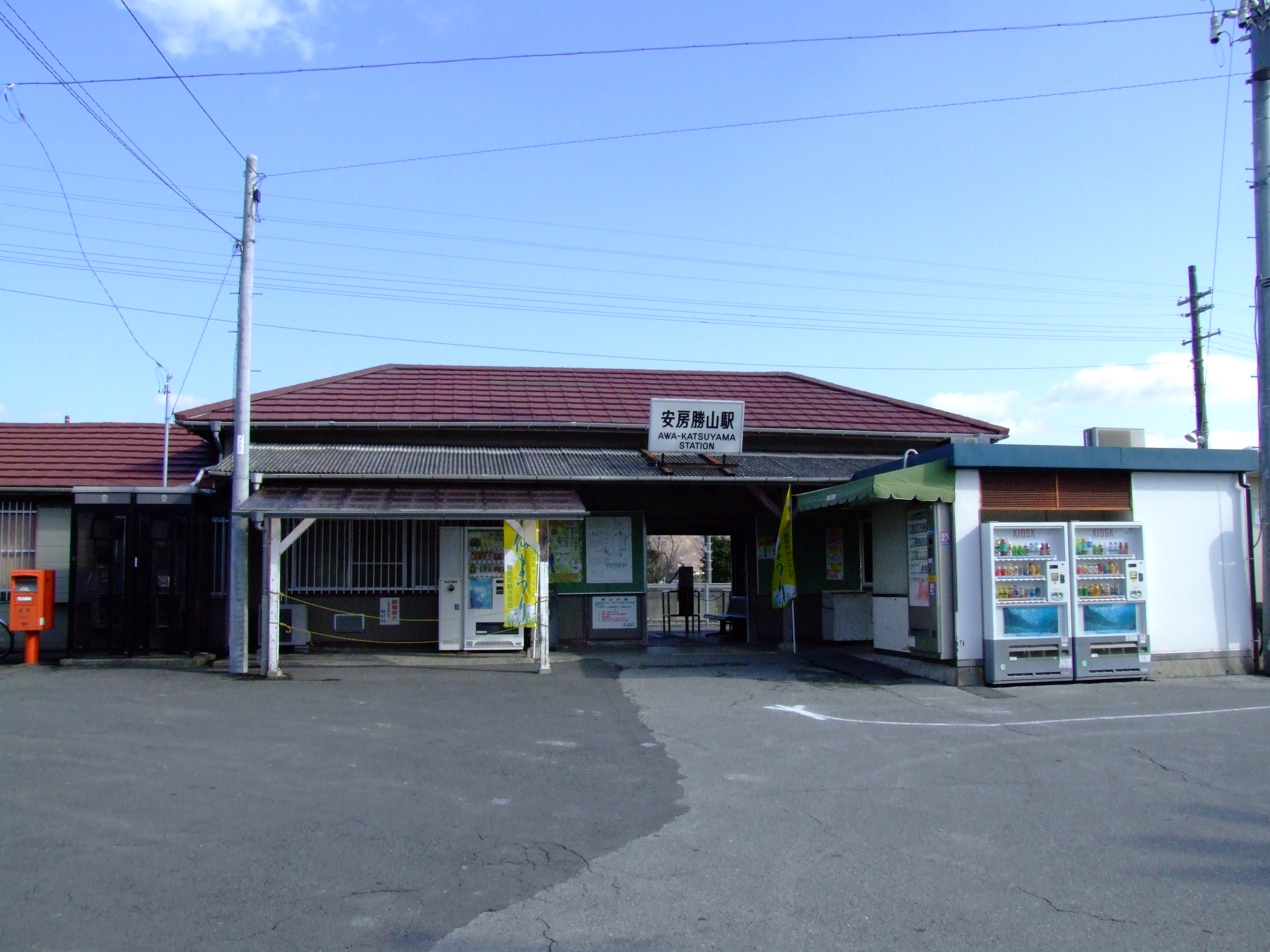
The station building in January 2006

== Surrounding area ==
- National Route 127

== See also ==
- List of railway stations in Japan
