= Sanukimachi Station =

Railway station in Futtsu, Chiba Prefecture, Japan

Sanukimachi Station 佐貫町駅
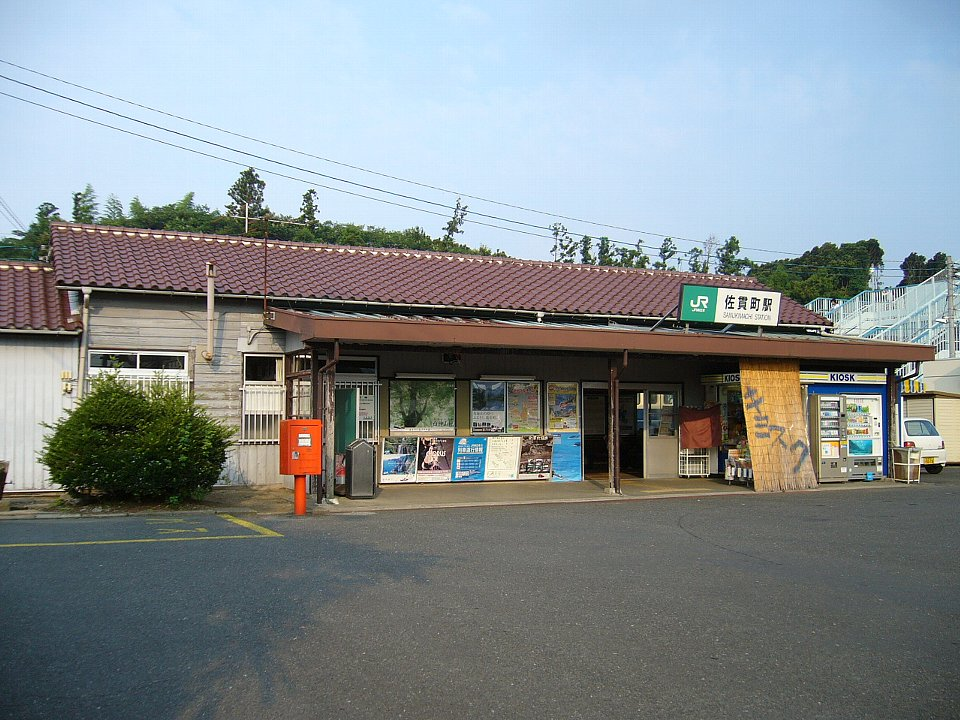
- Sanukimachi Station

General information
- Location: Kameda 540-2, Futtsu-shi, Chiba-ken 293-0057; Japan
- Coordinates: 35°15′38″N 139°52′33″E
- Operator: JR East
- Line: ■ Uchibō Line
- Distance: 50.7 km from Soga
- Platforms: 1 island platform

Other information
- Status: Staffed
- Website: Official website

History
- Opened: January 15, 1915

Passengers
- FY2019: 211

Services
Preceding station	JR East	Following station
Ōnuki towards Chiba	Uchibō Line Keiyō Rapid	Kazusa-Minato Terminus
Ōnuki towards Soga or Chiba	Uchibō Line Local	Kazusa-Minato towards Awa-Kamogawa
Location
- Location within Chiba Prefecture Location within Japan

Sanukimachi Station (佐貫町駅, Sanukimachi-eki) is a passenger railway station in the city of Futtsu, Chiba Prefecture, Japan, operated by the East Japan Railway Company (JR East).

== Lines ==
Sanukimachi Station is served by the Uchibo Line, and is located 50.7 km from the starting point of the line at Soga Station.

== Layout ==
The station consists of a single island platform serving two tracks, connected to the station building by a footbridge. The station is staffed.

=== Platforms ===
1	■ Uchibō Line	For Tateyama, Awa-Kamogawa
2	■ Uchibō Line	For Kimitsu, Kisarazu, Chiba

== History ==
Sanukimachi Station was opened on January 15, 1915. The station was absorbed into the JR East network upon the privatization of the Japan National Railways (JNR) on April 1, 1987.

== Passenger statistics ==
In fiscal 2019, the station was used by an average of 211 passengers daily (boarding passengers only).

== Surrounding area ==
- National Route 127
- National Route 465
- Sanuki Middle School

== See also ==
- List of railway stations in Japan
