= Futtsu Tateyama Road =

Road in Chiba prefecture, Japan

Futtsu–Tateyama Road
- 富津館山道路

Route information
- Length: 19.2 km (11.9 mi)
- Existed: 1999–present
- Component highways: National Route 127

Major junctions
- From: Futtsu-Takeoka Interchange; Tateyama Expressway; Chiba Prefectural Route 91 in Futtsu, Chiba
- To: Tomiura Interchange; National Route 127 in Minamibōsō, Chiba

Location
- Country: Japan

Highway system
- National highways of Japan; Expressways of Japan

The Futtsu Tateyama Road (富津館山道路, Futtsutateyama Dōro) is a 2-laned toll road in Chiba Prefecture, Japan. It is owned and operated by East Nippon Expressway Company.

== Overview ==
The route is officially designated as a bypass for National Route 127, however it is functionally an extension of the Tateyama Expressway. As such it is classified as a national highway for motor vehicles only with national expressway concurrency (高速自動車国道に並行する一般国道自動車専用道路, Kōsoku Jidōsha Kokudō ni Heikōsuru Ippan Kokudō Jidōsha Senyō Dōro) with the same design standard as other national expressways.

The road extends southward from the terminus of the Tateyama Expressway. It terminates at an intersection with a local road just to the north of Tateyama, a city on the Bōsō Peninsula.

The first section was opened to traffic in 1999 and the entire route was completed in 2004.

== List of interchanges and features ==
- IC - interchange, PA - parking area, TN - tunnel

No.	Name	Connections	Dist. from Origin	Dist. from Terminus	Bus Stop	Notes	Location (all in Chiba)
Through to Tateyama Expressway
20	Futtsu-Takeoka IC	Pref. Route 91 (Takeoka Inter Route)	0.0	19.2			Futtsu
21	Futtsu-Kanaya IC	Pref. Route 237 (Hama Kanaya Teishajō Route)	4.1	15.1			Futtsu
TN	Nokogiriyama Tunnel		↓	↑		Length - 1,551 m	Futtsu
TN	Nokogiriyama Tunnel		↓	↑		Length - 1,551 m	Kyonan
22	Kyonan-Hota IC	Pref. Route 34 (Kamogawa Hota Route)	7.8	11.4			Kyonan
23	Kyonan-Tomiyama IC	Pref. Route 184 (Sotono Katsuyama Route)	11.0	8.2			Kyonan
PA	Furari PA		↓	↑	○	Highway Oasis	Minamibōsō
TN	Tomiyama Tunnel		↓	↑		Length - 1,450 m	Minamibōsō
24	Tomiura IC	National Route 127 (Uchibō Nagisa Line)	19.2	0.0			Minamibōsō
