= Cape Futtsu =

Cape in Futtsu, Chiba Prefecture, Japan

Cape Futtsu 富津岬 (Futtsu misaki)
- Cape
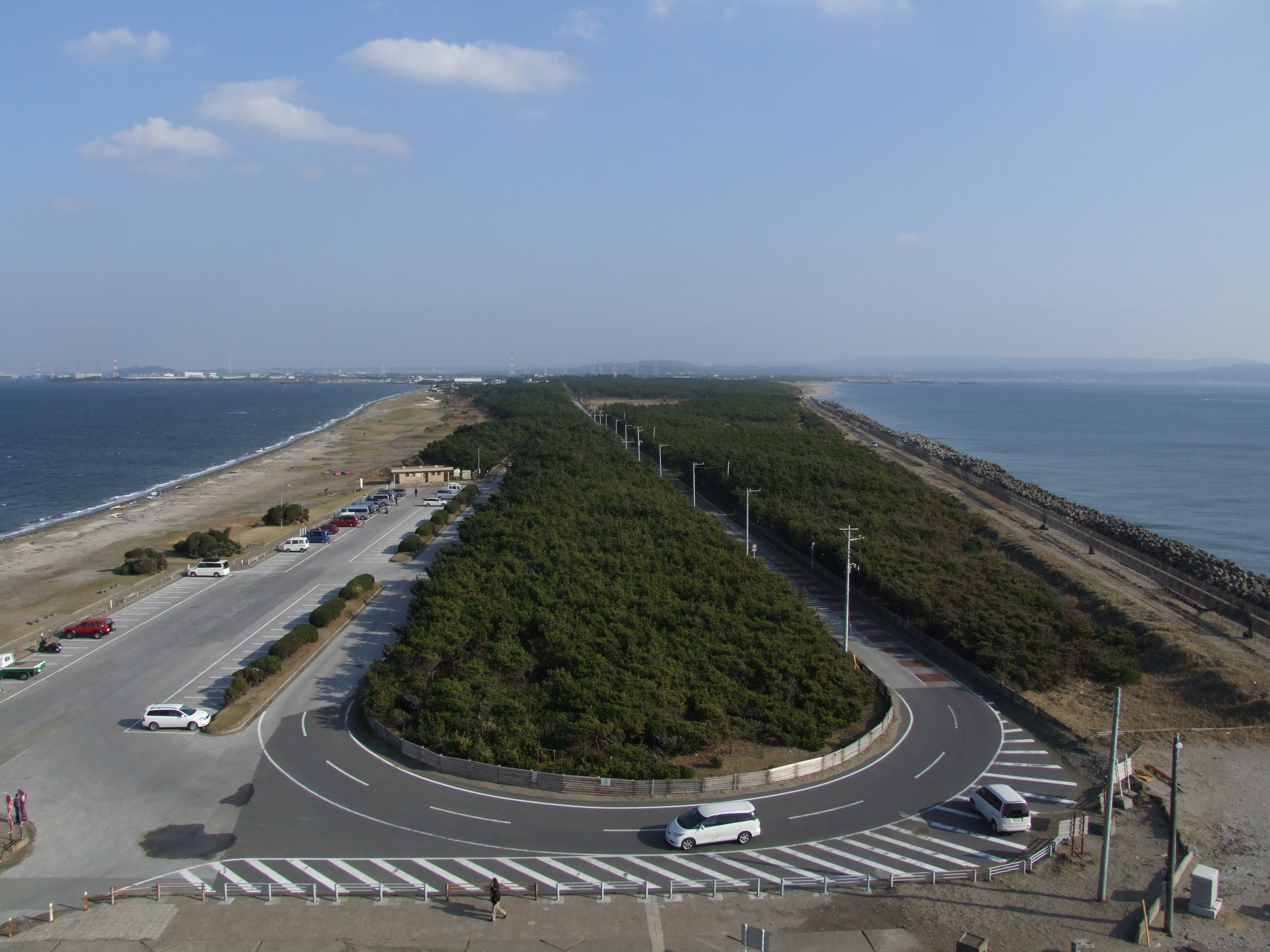
- View of Cape Futtsu from the Meiji Centennial Observation Tower

- Coordinates: 35°18′46″N 139°47′12″E
- Location: Futtsu, Chiba Prefecture, Japan
- Offshore water bodies: Pacific Ocean

Cape Futtsu (富津岬, Futtsu-misaki?) is a cape located east of Tokyo Bay in Futtsu, Chiba, Japan. The entire area in the cape has been developed as Chiba Prefectural Futtsu Park, and has been selected as one of Japan's Top 100 White Sand and Green Pines and one of Kanto's Top 100 Views of Fuji. Futtsu Tidal Flat on the north side of Cape Futtsu is included in Japan's 500 important wetlands.

== Geography ==
Cape Fuutsu is a cape that juts out from near the mouth of the Koito River toward Tokyo Bay for approximately 5 km (3.1 mi) in the southwest direction. It consists of a long, narrow sandbar called Futtsusu that stretches from the mouth of the Koito River to the tip of the cape, and a triangular alluvial plain called Futtsuheiya that stretches from there to Isonezaki. Off the tip of the sandbar are the First Sea Fort and the Second Sea Fort (artificial islands), which were used as forts.

Along with Cape Kannon on the Miura Peninsula on the opposite shore, which is about 6 km (3.7 mi) away, Cape Futtsu forms the boundary between Tokyo Bay and the Uraga Channel. On the north side of the cape, a 174-hectare (ha) tidal flat called Futtsu Higata is formed on the calm shore of the inner bay, and on the south side, it serves as a breakwater against the rough waves of the open ocean.

The wetland also has a community of seaside plants that attract mallards and spot-billed ducks, and is designated as a natural monument of Chiba Prefecture as the Futtsu Seaside Plant Community. On the south side, there are many communities of halophytic plants such as Kouboumugi and Kikamonohashi, which grow on Kujukuri Beach, and on the north shore of the beach, inner bay wild plants such as Psyllium japonica and Okahijiki grow thickly.
