= Hamakanaya Station =

Railway station in Futtsu, Chiba Prefecture, Japan

Hamakanaya Station 浜金谷駅
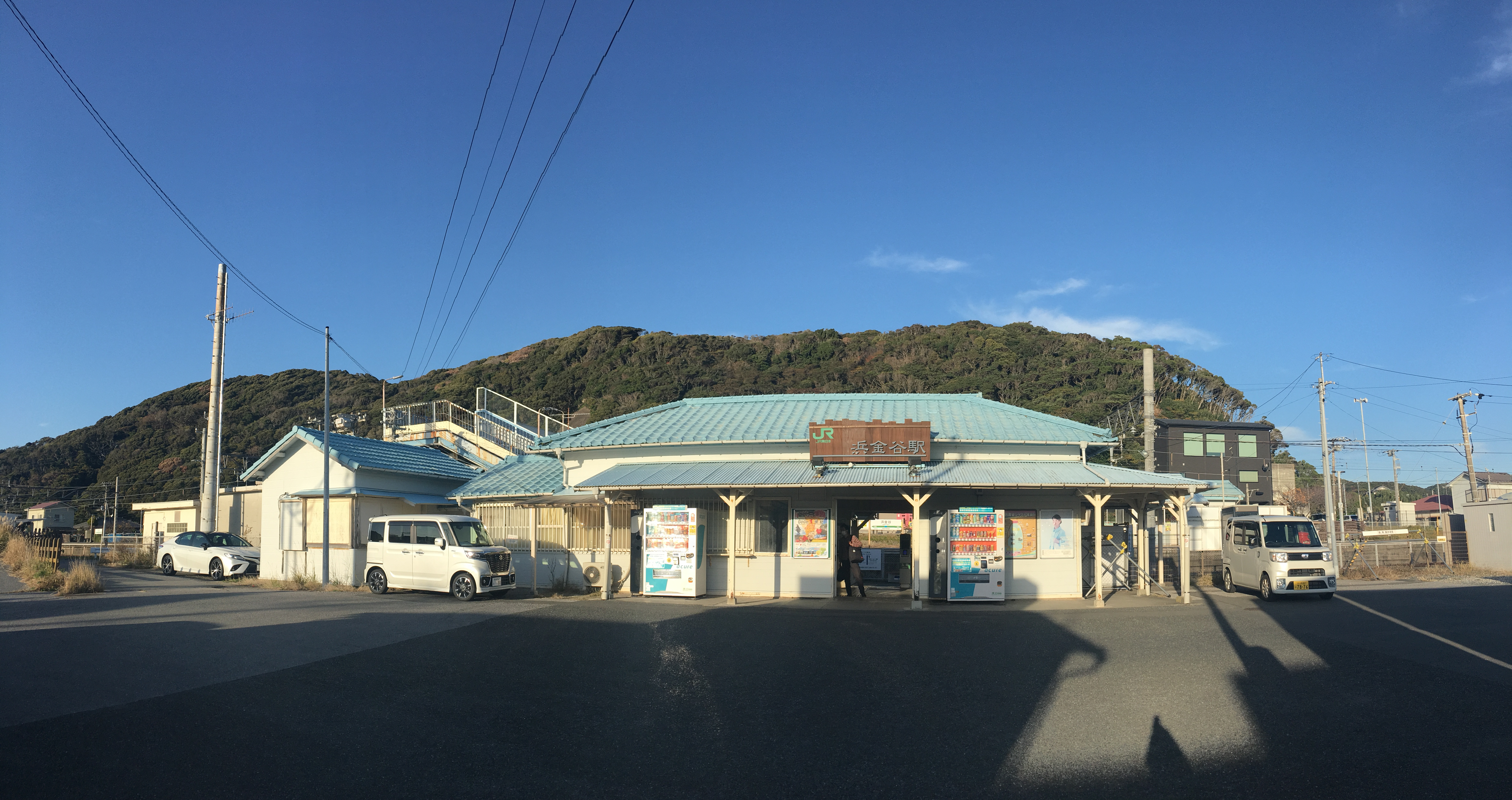
- Hamakanaya Station in December 2022

General information
- Location: 2209 Kanaya, Futtsu-shi, Chiba-ken 299-1861; Japan
- Coordinates: 35.1681°N 139.8224°E
- Operator: JR East
- Line: ■ Uchibō Line
- Distance: 64.0 km from Soga
- Platforms: 1 island platform

Other information
- Status: Staffed
- Website: Official website

History
- Opened: October 11, 1916

Passengers
- FY2019: 237

Services
Preceding station	JR East	Following station
Takeoka towards Soga or Chiba	Uchibō Line Local	Hota towards Awa-Kamogawa
Location
- Location within Chiba Prefecture Location within Japan

Hamakanaya Station (浜金谷駅, Hamakanaya-eki)is a passenger railway station in the city of Futtsu, Chiba Prefecture, Japan, operated by the East Japan Railway Company (JR East).

== Lines ==
Hamakanaya Station is served by the Uchibo Line, and is located 64.0 km from the starting point of the line at Soga Station.

== Station layout ==
The station consists of a single island platform serving two tracks, connected to the station building by a footbridge. There was a "Midori no Madoguchi" until July 31, 2023.

=== Platforms ===
1	■ Uchibo Line	for Kimitsu, Kisarazu, and Chiba
2	■ Uchibo Line	for Tateyama and Awa-Kamogawa

== History ==
Hamakanaya Station opened on October 11, 1916. The station was absorbed into the JR East network upon the privatization of the Japanese National Railways (JNR) on April 1, 1987.

== Passenger statistics ==
In fiscal 2019, the station was used by an average of 237 passengers daily (boarding passengers only).

== Surrounding area ==
- Nokogiriyama Ropeway
- Kanaya Port
  - Tokyo-Wan Ferry (to Kurihama, Port of Yokosuka)
- National Route 127

== See also ==
- List of railway stations in Japan
