= Masaaki Hirano =

Masaaki HIRANO
- Born: January 15, 1931; Japan
- Died: November 22, 2008 (aged 77)
- Other name: 平野 雅章
- Occupation: food historian

Masaaki Hirano (平野 雅章, Hirano Masaaki; January 15, 1931 – November 22, 2008) was a Japanese food historian from the city of Futtsu, Chiba. He was a courtesy member of the Cultural Academic Society. He wrote under the pen name Masaaki.

== Biography ==
He was a graduate of the psychology section of the literature department of Waseda University. While attending university, he served as an apprentice to Kitaoji Rosanjin to study the fine arts of cooking. Afterwards, he worked in the editorial office at the magazine Housewife’s Friend. He wrote about the cultural history of Japanese food.

He was one of the regular judges on the Fuji TV Corporation hit program Iron Chef, where he bore the title “Rosanjin Scholar”. Asako Kishi was also a regular judge on the program, and was a coworker of Masaaki’s while he worked at Housewife’s Friend.

He appeared in the "Seed of Trivia” segment of “Hey! Spring of Trivia” (broadcast on November 11, 2005) where he addressed the issue of “broth from which brand of cup of Ramen best complemented cold rice”. The other judges were food critic Mita Morio, cooking researcher Eiko Egaki, and the owner of Passion restaurant Andre Passion.

Hirano died in November 2008 of a heart attack.
