= Tateyama Expressway =

Expressway in Chiba Prefecture, Japan

Tateyama Expressway
- 館山自動車道

Route information
- Length: 55.7 km (34.6 mi)
- Existed: 1995–present

Major junctions
- From: Chūō-ku, Chiba; Keiyō Road
- To: Futtsu-Takeoka Interchange in Futtsu, Chiba; Futtsu Tateyama Road; Chiba Prefectural Route 91

Location
- Country: Japan
- Major cities: Ichihara, Sodegaura, Kisarazu, Kimitsu, Futtsu

Highway system
- National highways of Japan; Expressways of Japan

The Tateyama Expressway (館山自動車道, Tateyama Jidōsha-dō) is a national expressway in Chiba Prefecture, Japan. It is owned and operated by East Nippon Expressway Company.

== Naming ==
Tateyama refers to the city of the same name on the Bōsō Peninsula, a major city in the region. Though the Tateyama Expressway does not actually reach the city proper, its extension the Futtsu Tateyama Road terminates at a point just beyond the city boundary in Minamibōsō City.

Officially the expressway is referred to as the Higashi-Kantō Expressway Tateyama Route and the Higashi-Kantō Expressway Chiba Futtsu Route.

== Overview ==
Together with the Keiyō Road and Futtsu Tateyama Road, the expressway forms a link connecting the greater Tokyo area with southern Chiba Prefecture. The expressway has a junction with the Tokyo Bay Aqua-Line, creating the only direct road link connecting Chiba and Kanagawa Prefectures.

The first section of the expressway was opened to traffic in 1995 and the entire route was completed in 2007. The section from Kimitsu Interchange to Futtsu-Takeoka Interchange is 2 lanes, while the remainder is 4 lanes.

== List of interchanges and features ==
- IC - interchange, JCT - junction, SA - service area, PA - parking area, BS - bus stop, TN - tunnel, BR - bridge, TB - toll gate

=== Main Route ===
No.	Name	Connections	Dist. from Origin	Dist. from Terminus	Bus Stop	Notes	Location (all in Chiba)
Through to Keiyō Road
13	Ichihara IC	National Route 297 (Ichihara Bypass)	8.0	43.4			Ichihara
BR	Yōrōgawa Bridge		↓	↑			Ichihara
SA	Ichihara SA		(11.7); 12.6	39.7 (38.8)			Ichihara
14	Anesaki-Sodegaura IC	Pref. Route 24 (Chiba Kamogawa Route)	18.0	33.4			Ichihara
BR	Obitsugawa Bridge		↓	↑			Kisarazu
BR	Obitsugawa Bridge		↓	↑			Sodegaura
15	Kisarazu-kita IC	National Route 409 (Bōsō Ōdan Road); National Route 410	25.0	26.4			Kisarazu
16	Kisarazu JCT	Tokyo Bay Aqua-Line; Ken-Ō Expressway	26.8	24.6			Kisarazu
17	Kisarazu-minami JCT	Kisarazu-minami Branch Route	30.7	20.7			Kisarazu
BS	Kisarazu-Hatorino Bus Stop		↓	↑	○		Kisarazu
18	Kimitsu IC	Pref. Route 92 (Kimitsu Kamogawa Route)	34.7	16.7			Kimitsu
BR	Koitogawa Bridge		↓	↑			Kimitsu
PA	Kimitsu PA		39.3	12.1			Kimitsu
19	Futtsu-Chūō IC	National Route 127 / National Route 465 (Uchibō Nagisa Line)	43.9	7.5			Futtsu
TN	Tenba Tunnel		↓	↑		Length - 1,260 m	Futtsu
20	Futtsu-Takeoka IC	Pref. Route 91 (Takeoka Inter Route)	51.4	0.0			Futtsu
Through to Futtsu Tateyama Road

=== Kisarazu-minami Branch Route ===
No.	Name	Connections	Dist. from Origin	Dist. from Terminus	Bus Stop	Notes	Location (all in Chiba)
17	Kisarazu-minami JCT	Main Route	0.0	4.3			Kisarazu
TB	Kisarazu-minami Toll Gate		↓	↑			Kisarazu
17-1	Kisarazu-minami IC	National Route 127; National Route 16 (Tokyo Wangan Road)	4.3	0.0			Kisarazu
