= Kyonan =

Kyonan 鋸南町
- Town
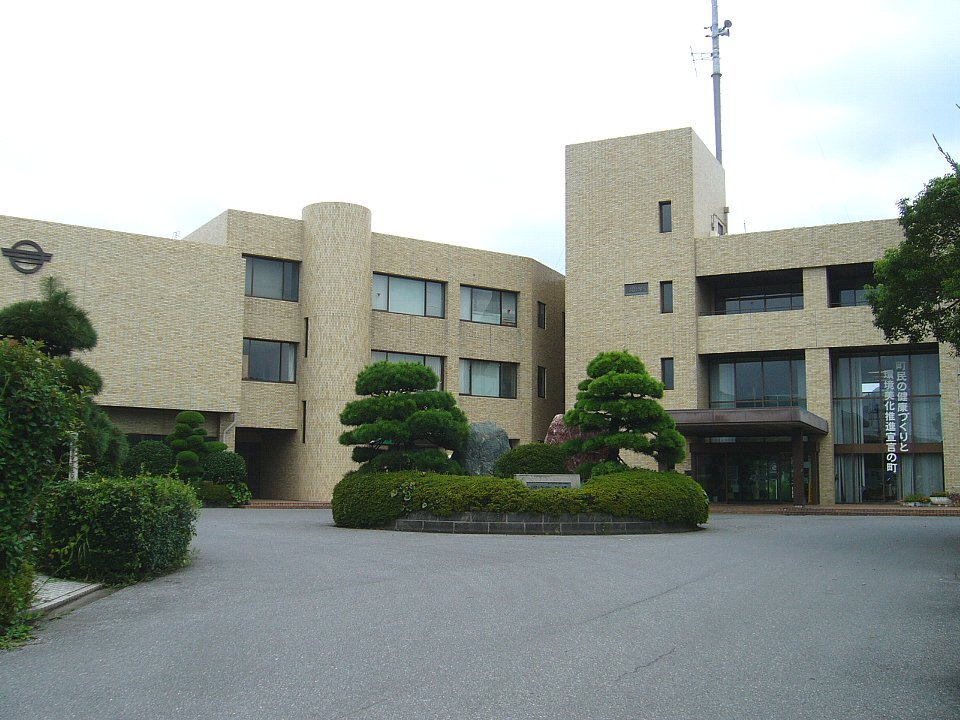
- Kyonan Town Office

- Flag Seal

- Location of Kyonan in Chiba Prefecture

- Coordinates: 35°07′N 139°50′E
- Country: Japan
- Region: Kantō
- Prefecture: Chiba
- District: Awa

Area
  - Total: 45.16 km^{2} (17.44 sq mi)

Population (December 31, 2020)
  - Total: 7,409
  - Density: 164.1/km^{2} (424.9/sq mi)
- Time zone: UTC+9 (Japan Standard Time)
- Tree: Camellia
- Flower: Narcissus
- Phone number: 0470-55-2111
- Address: 3458 Sakuma, Kyonan-machi, Awa-gun, Chiba-ken 299-2115
- Website: Official website

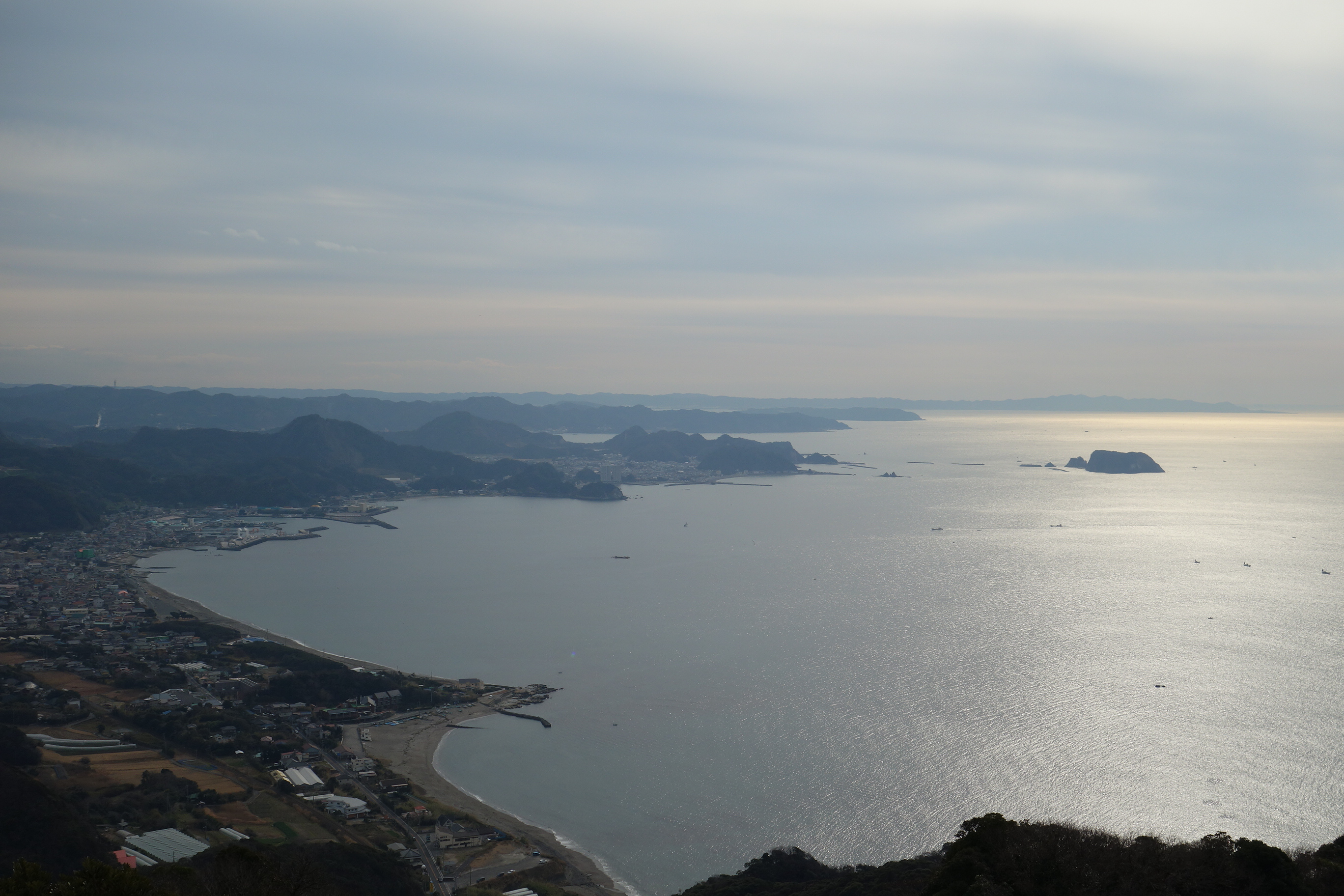
View of Hota from Mount Nokogiri

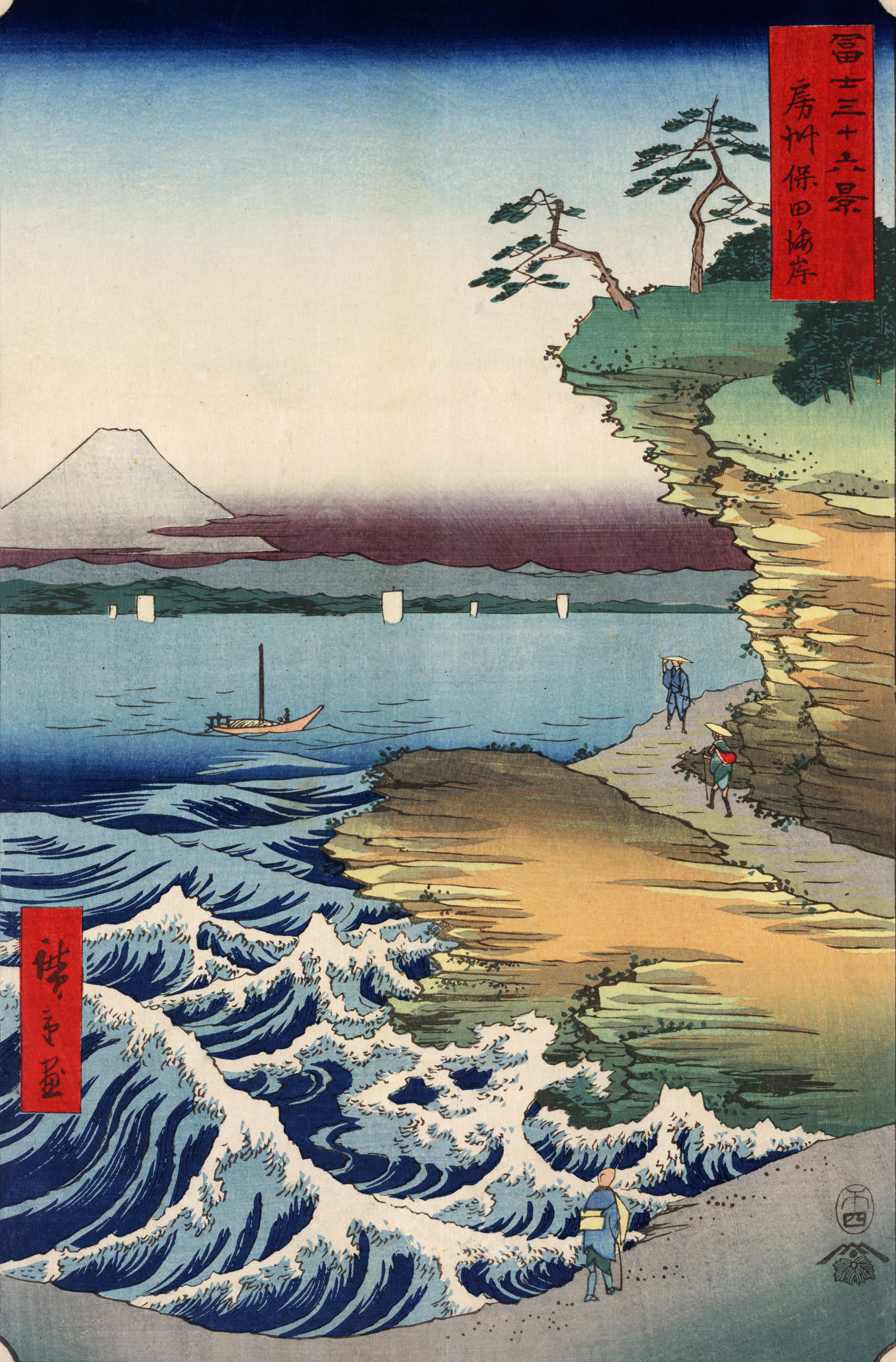

Kyonan (鋸南町, Kyonan-machi) is a town located in Chiba Prefecture, Japan. As of 1 November 2020, the town had an estimated population of 7,409 in 3543 households and a population density of 160 persons per km^{2}. The total area of the city is 45.16 square kilometres (17.44 sq mi).

== Geography ==
Kyonan is located in southwestern Bōsō Peninsula, about 60 kilometers from the prefectural capital at Chiba and 60 to 70 kilometers from central Tokyo. Facing the Tokyo Bay coast, the inland mountainous area is part of the Bōsō Hill Range. At the southern end is Nishigasaki, which juts out into the Uraga Channel. The coastline is rugged and has fishing ports such as Yasuda and Katsuyama. There are also many islands and reefs. The town extends approximately 10.75 kilometers east to west by 7.3 kilometers north and south. The coastal portion of the town is within the boundaries of the Minami Bōsō Quasi-National Park.

=== Neighboring municipalities ===
Chiba Prefecture

- Futtsu
- Kamogawa
- Minamibōsō

=== Climate ===
Kyonan has a humid subtropical climate (Köppen Cfa) characterized by warm summers and cool winters with light to no snowfall. The average annual temperature in Kyonan is 15.2 °C. The average annual rainfall is 1804 mm with September as the wettest month. The temperatures are highest on average in August, at around 26.1 °C, and lowest in January, at around 5.4 °C.

== Demographics ==
Per Japanese census data, the population of Kyonan has declined by more than half over the past 70 years.

Historical population
Year	Pop.	±%
1920	12,977	—
1930	13,094	+0.9%
1940	12,574	−4.0%
1950	16,508	+31.3%
1960	15,131	−8.3%
1970	13,316	−12.0%
1980	12,843	−3.6%
1990	11,696	−8.9%
2000	10,521	−10.0%
2010	8,950	−14.9%
2020	6,993	−21.9%

== History ==
The area of present-day Kyonan was part of ancient Awa Province. The villages of Katayama and Ota were established with the creation of the modern municipalities system on April 1, 1889. Katsuyama was raised to town status in January 1896 and Hota in January 1897. The town of Kyonan was formed by the merger of Katsuyama and Hota on March 30, 1959. With the creation of the city of Minamibōsō in 2006, Kyonan is the only remaining unincorporated portion of Awa District.

== Government ==
Kyonan has a mayor-council form of government with a directly elected mayor and a unicameral town council of 12 members. Kyonan, together with the city of Minamibōsō, contributes one member to the Chiba Prefectural Assembly. In terms of national politics, the city is part of Chiba 12th district of the lower house of the Diet of Japan.

== Economy ==
Kyonan serves as a commercial center for the surrounding region of southwest-central Chiba Prefecture. The primary industry is commercial fishing and agriculture (rice and flowers). Mount Saga has been used for narcissus cultivation at least from the Edo period 1603–1868, and Kyonan remains one of the largest producers of the flower in Japan. The tourist industry is a growing component of the local economy.

== Education ==
Kyonan has one public elementary school, Kyonan Elementary School (鋸南小学校); and one public junior high school, Kyonan Junior High School (鋸南中学校), operated by the town government. The former Katsuyama Elementary School (勝山小学校) and Yasuda Elementary School (保田小学校) merged into Kyonan Elementary in 2014, with the Katsuyama building becoming the Kyonan Elementary building.

The town does not have a high school; however, the Chiba Prefectural Board of Education operates one special education school for the handicapped.

Hota Shiosai Elementary School (保田しおさい学校) is physically located in Kyonan, but it is a municipally-operated school by Katsushika City, Tokyo.

== Transportation ==
=== Railway ===
JR East – Uchibō Line

- Hota – Awa-Katsuyama

=== Highway ===
- National Route 127

== Noted people ==
- Hishikawa Moronobu (1618–1694), ukiyoe artist of the Edo period, was born in the village of Hodomura in present-day Kyonan. The Hishikawa family practiced dyeing and a gold and silver-thread embroidery in the area. The Hishikawa Moronobu Memorial Hall was built in Kyonan to commemorate his life and work.

== Local attractions ==
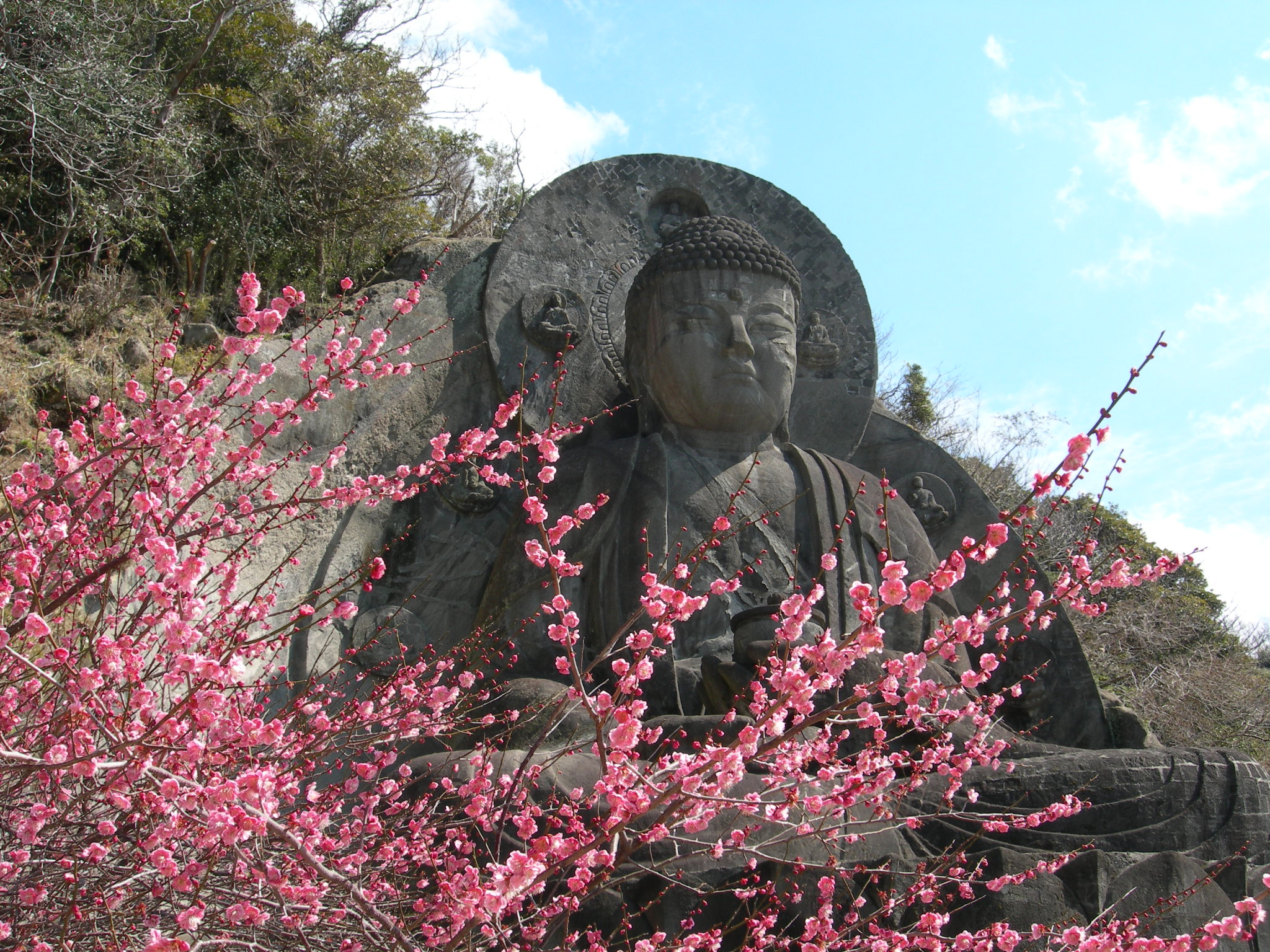
Nihon-ji Daibutsu

- Hishikawa Moronobu Memorial Hall
- Hota Beach, visited by Natsume Sōseki in 1899
- Mount Nokogiri
- Nihon-ji temple complex
- Narcissus fields on Mount Saga
