= Haru Onuki =

American singer

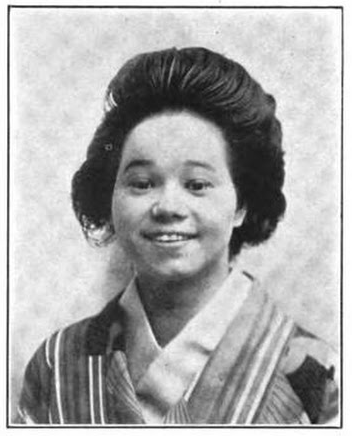
- Haru Onuki, from a 1916 publication
- Born: August 7, 1894; Phoenix, Arizona, U.S.
- Died: March 2, 1965 (aged 70); New York, New York, U.S.
- Other names: Haruko Onuki, Marion Ohnick
- Occupation: Singer

Haru Onuki (August 7, 1894 - March 2, 1965), also seen as Haruko Onuki (Japanese: 大貫 春子) and Marion Ohnick, was a Japanese-American soprano singer.

== Early life and education ==
Marion Ohnick was born in Phoenix, Arizona, the youngest child of Hachiro Onuki, also known as Hatchero Ohnick, and Katherine Shannon Ohnick. Her father was born in Japan, and moved to the United States in 1876, to display Japanese artifacts at the Centennial Exposition in Philadelphia. He settled near Phoenix, and later in the Seattle area. In 1884, Hachiro Onuki became a naturalized United States citizen.

Haru Onuki studied voice with Oscar Saenger.

== Career ==
Helen and Marion Ohnick performed music together as a sister act on vaudeville as young women. As Haru Onuki, she sang with the Sousa Band at New York's Hippodrome in 1916. She introduced the song "Poor Butterfly" in The Big Show (1916) on Broadway. "Miss Onuki speaks English far better than most Americans," noted a 1916 profile, as Onuki's American birth and citizenship were left unmentioned in much of her press. "She holds audiences in rapt attention," wrote journalist Nellie Revell of Onuki in 1917. "they listen, they watch, and they will be glad to see her again." In 1916, she contributed a recipe for a gelatin dessert to a celebrity cookbook fundraiser.

In the 1920s, Onuki starred Madama Butterfly with the San Carlo Opera Company, and toured the United States, Canada and England with the company.

== Personal life ==
Haru Onuki dated cartoonist Robert Ripley in the 1920s. In 1932, she sued him for breach of promise, claiming that he promised to marry her and then did not. She died in 1965, aged 71 years. Her gravesite is with those of her parents and her sister, in Long Beach, California. The Ohnick Family Papers at Arizona State University includes her correspondence and photographs.
