= Hota Station (Chiba) =

Railway station in Kyonan, Chiba Prefecture, Japan

Hota Station 保田駅
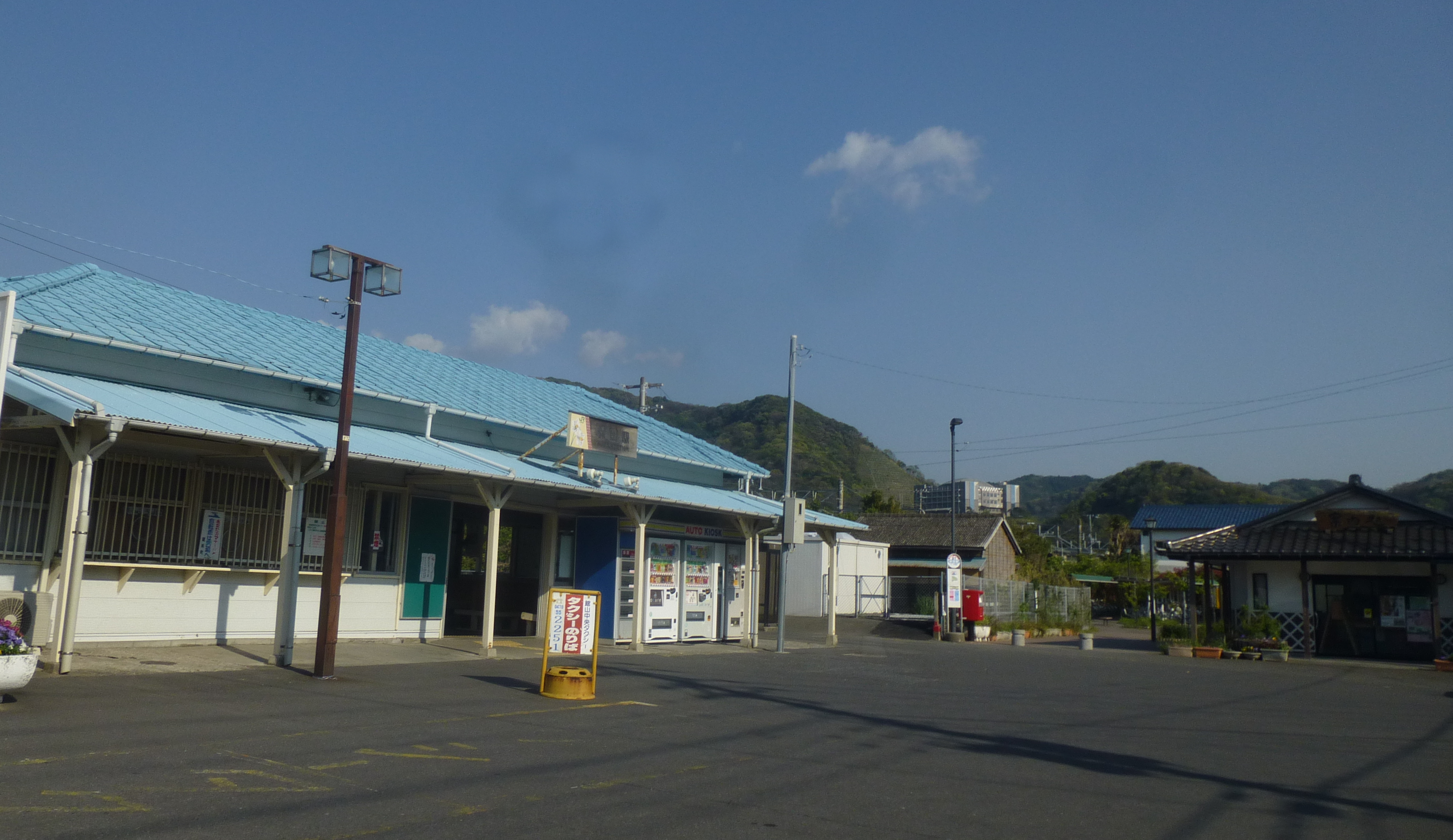
- Hota Station, 2013

General information
- Location: Hota 249, Kyonan-machi, Awa-gun, Chiba-ken 299-1902; Japan
- Coordinates: 35.1411°N 139.838°E
- Operator: JR East
- Line: ■ Uchibō Line
- Distance: 73.7 km from Soga
- Platforms: 1 island platform

Other information
- Status: Staffed
- Website: Official website

History
- Opened: August 1, 1917

Passengers
- FY2019: 218

Services
Preceding station	JR East	Following station
Hamakanaya towards Soga or Chiba	Uchibō Line Local	Awa-Katsuyama towards Awa-Kamogawa
Location
- Location within Chiba Prefecture Location within Japan

Hota Station (保田駅, Hota-eki) is a passenger railway station in the town of Kyonan, Awa District, Chiba Prefecture, Japan, operated by the East Japan Railway Company (JR East). However, it is still a staffed station.

== Lines ==
Hota Station is served by the Uchibō Line, and is located 67.5 kilometres (41.9 mi) from the western terminus of the line at Soga Station.

== Station layout ==
The station has a single island platform serving two tracks, connected to the station building by a footbridge. The station used to have a Midori no Madoguchi staffed ticket office, but it was closed on January 31, 2021.

=== Platforms ===
1	■ Uchibō Line	For Kimitsu, Kisarazu, Chiba
2	■ Uchibō Line	For Tateyama, Awa-Kamogawa

== History ==
Hota Station was opened on August 1, 1917. The station was absorbed into the JR East network upon the privatization of the Japan National Railways (JNR) on April 1, 1987.

== Passenger statistics ==
In fiscal year 2019, the station was used by an average of 218 passengers daily (boarding passengers only).

== Surrounding area ==
- National Route 127

== See also ==
- List of railway stations in Japan
