= Kazusa-Minato Station =

Railway station in Futtsu, Chiba Prefecture, Japan

Kazusa-Minato Station 上総湊駅
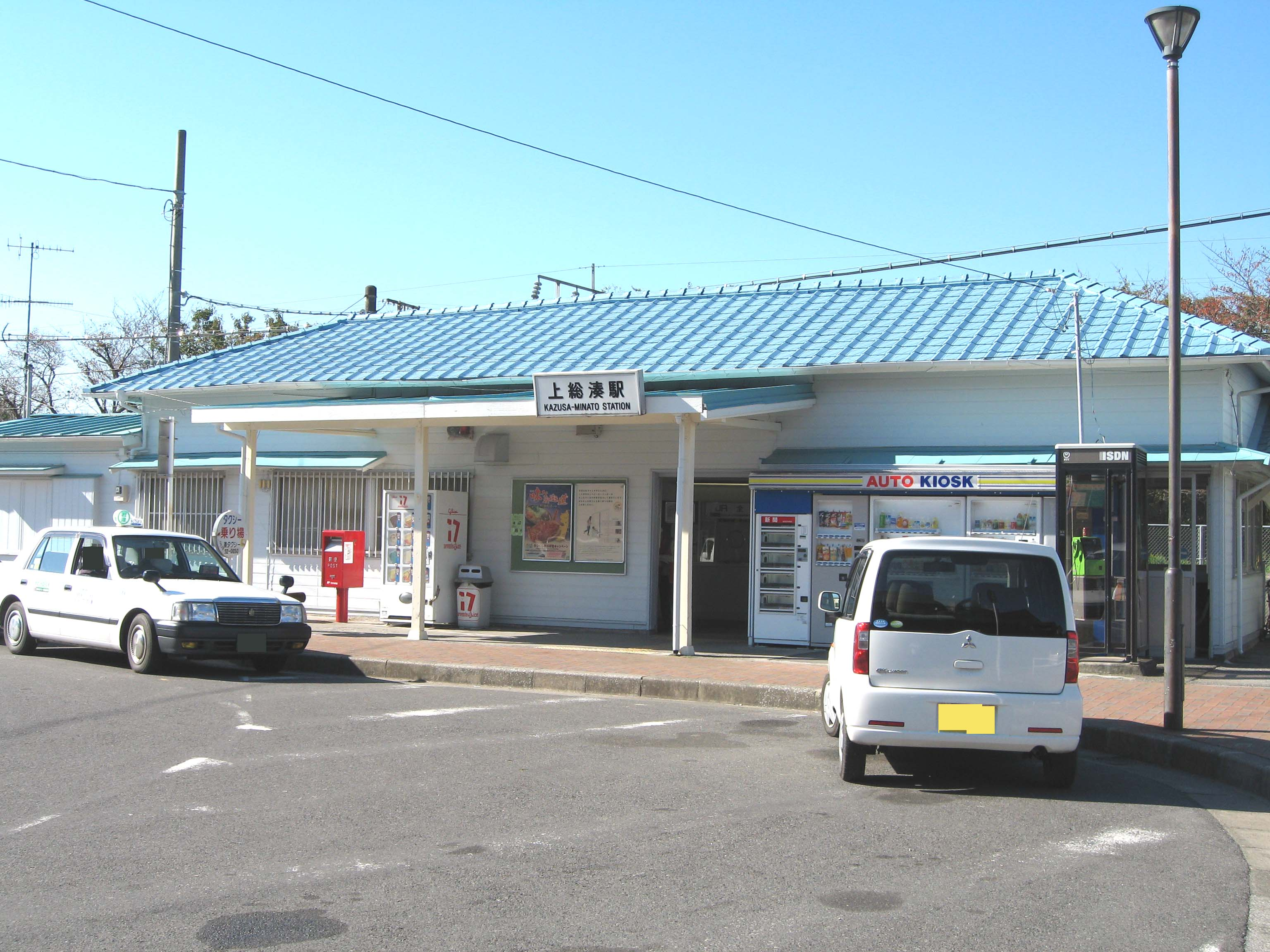
- Kazusa-Minato Station in 2007

General information
- Location: Minato 736, Futtsu-shi, Chiba-ken 299-1607; Japan
- Coordinates: 35.2223°N 139.8713°E
- Operator: JR East
- Line: ■ Uchibō Line
- Distance: 55.1 km from Soga
- Platforms: 1 island platform

Other information
- Status: Staffed
- Website: Official website

History
- Opened: January 15, 1915

Passengers
- FY2019: 639

Services
Preceding station	JR East	Following station
Sanukimachi towards Chiba	Uchibō Line Keiyō Rapid	Terminus
Sanukimachi towards Soga or Chiba	Uchibō Line Local	Takeoka towards Awa-Kamogawa
Location
- Location within Chiba Prefecture Location within Japan

Kazusa-Minato Station (上総湊駅, Kazusa-Minato-eki) is a passenger railway station in the city of Futtsu, Chiba Prefecture, Japan, operated by the East Japan Railway Company (JR East).

== Lines ==
Kazusa-Minato Station is served by the Uchibo Line, and is located 55.1 km from the starting point of the line at Soga Station.

== Layout ==
The station consists of a single island platform serving two tracks, connected to the station building by a footbridge. The station is staffed.

=== Platforms ===
1	■ Uchibō Line	For Tateyama, Awa-Kamogawa
2	■ Uchibō Line	For Kimitsu, Kisarazu, Chiba

== History ==
Kazusa-Minato Station was opened on January 15, 1915. The station was absorbed into the JR East network upon the privatization of the Japan National Railways (JNR) on April 1, 1987.

== Passenger statistics ==
In fiscal 2019, the station was used by an average of 237 passengers daily (boarding passengers only).

== Surrounding area ==
- Minato Elementary School
- National Route 127
- National Route 465

== See also ==
- List of railway stations in Japan
