= Futtsu =

Futtsu 富津市
- City
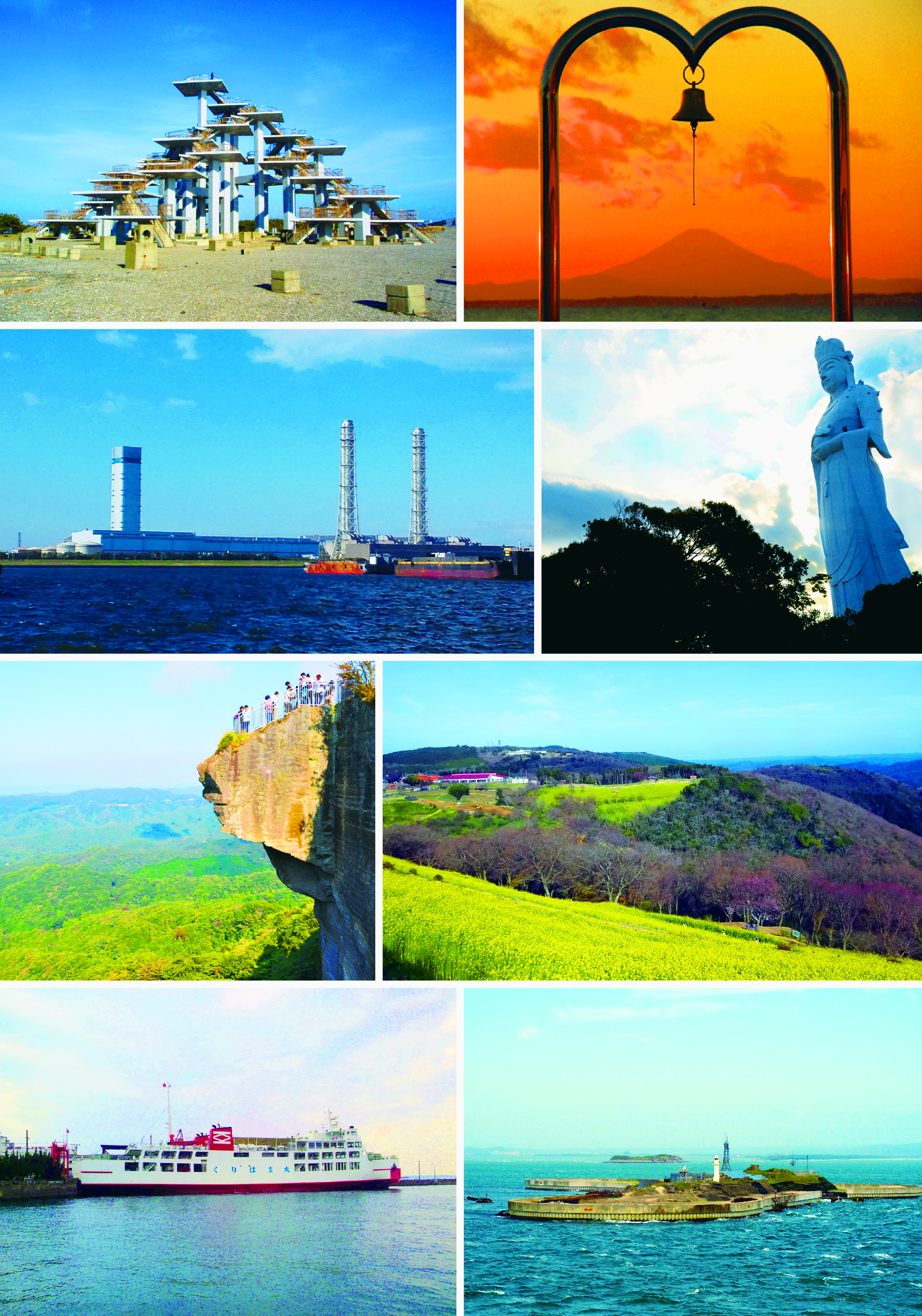
Cape Futtsu	Kanaya Port
Futtsu Power Station	Tokyo Bay Kannon
Mount Nokogiri	Mother Farm
Hanakanaya Port	No.2 Tokyo Bay Fortress
- Flag Seal

- Location of Futtsu in Chiba Prefecture

- Coordinates: 35°18′14.7″N 139°51′25.3″E
- Country: Japan
- Region: Kantō
- Prefecture: Chiba

Government
  - Mayor: Seiji Sakuma (since October 2004)

Area
  - Total: 205.53 km^{2} (79.36 sq mi)

Population (November 1, 2020)
  - Total: 42,476
  - Density: 206.67/km^{2} (535.26/sq mi)
- Time zone: UTC+9 (Japan Standard Time)
- Tree: Sakura
- Flower: Azalea
- Website: Official website

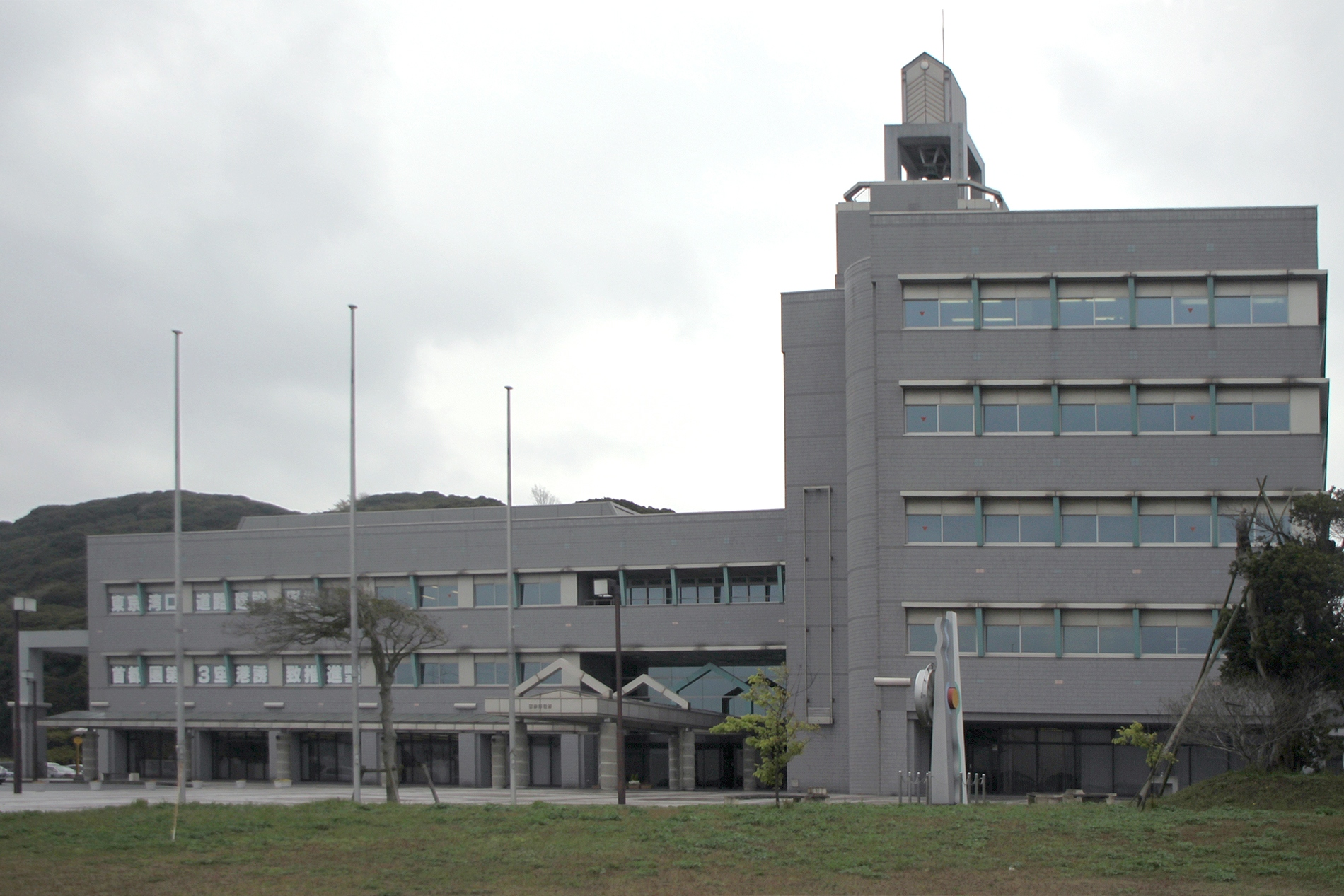
Futtsu City Hall

Futtsu (富津市, Futtsu-shi) is a Japanese city in Chiba Prefecture. As of 1 November 2020 it had an estimated population of 42,476 in 18,115 households and a population density of 210 persons per km^{2}. The total area of the city is 205.53 square kilometres (79.36 sq mi).

== Geography ==
Futtsu is located in the southern part of Chiba prefecture, about 40 kilometers from the prefectural capital at Chiba and 40 to 50 kilometers from the center of Tokyo. It is on the southwest coast of Bōsō Peninsula, facing the Uraga Channel at the southern end of Tokyo Bay. Cape Futtsu protrudes into Tokyo Bay, and the coastal areas are part of the Minami Bōsō Quasi-National Park. Although considered to be within the Kantō Plain, inland areas of the city are hilly.

=== Neighboring municipalities ===
Chiba Prefecture

- Kamogawa
- Kimitsu
- Kyonan

=== Climate ===
Futtsu has a humid subtropical climate (Köppen Cfa) characterized by warm summers and cool winters with light to no snowfall. The average annual temperature in Futtsu is 15.7 °C. The average annual rainfall is 1695 mm with September as the wettest month. The temperatures are highest on average in August, at around 26.5 °C, and lowest in January, at around 6.0 °C.

== Demographics ==
Per Japanese census data, the population of Futtsu has declined in recent decades.

Historical population
Year	Pop.	±%
1920	38,662	—
1930	39,385	+1.9%
1940	41,216	+4.6%
1950	52,157	+26.5%
1960	49,762	−4.6%
1970	52,034	+4.6%
1980	56,102	+7.8%
1990	54,876	−2.2%
2000	52,839	−3.7%
2010	48,073	−9.0%
2020	42,465	−11.7%

== History ==
The area of modern Futtsu has been inhabited since the Japanese Paleolithic period, and numerous remains from the Jōmon, Yayoi and Kofun period have been found within the city limits. The area also is prominent in the Yamatotakeru mythology. Under the Ritsuryō system of the Nara period, the area became part of Amaha County and Sue County of Kazusa Province. Large scale shōen in the Heian period gave way to feudal samurai estates in the Kamakura period, with large portions controlled by the temple of Shomyo-ji in Mutsuura. The area was contested between the Takeda clan and Satomi clan during the Sengoku period. During the Edo period under the Tokugawa shogunate, most of the area was under the control of Sanuki Domain. After the Meiji Restoration, the area came under Kimitsu District

Futtsu village was established with the creation of the modern municipalities system on April 1, 1889. It was elevated to town status on December 1, 1897. Futtsu expanded through merger with neighboring Aoyagi Town on March 31, 1955, and again through merger with Amaha Town and Osawa Town on April 25, 1971. Futtsu attained city status on September 1, 1971.

According to Victory at Sea (H. Saloman and R. Hanser, Doubleday, 1959), Futtsu was on August 30, 1945, the site of the initial Allied landing on the Japanese mainland following the declared surrender. This was a test whether the Japanese would obey the Emperor's surrender order. There was no resistance.

== Government ==
Futtsu has a mayor-council form of government with a directly elected mayor and a unicameral city council of 16 members. Futtsu contributes one member to the Chiba Prefectural Assembly. In terms of national politics, the city is part of Chiba 12th district of the lower house of the Diet of Japan.

== Transportation ==
=== Railway ===
JR East – Uchibō Line

- Aohori – Ōnuki – Sanukimachi – Kazusa-Minato – Takeoka – Hamakanaya

=== Highway ===
- Tateyama Expressway
- National Route 16(connecting Tokyo and Chiba)
- National Route 127
- National Route 465

== Sister cities ==
- Carlsbad, California, United States, since October 25, 1988

== Local attractions ==
- Chiba Prefectural Futtsu Park
- Mother Farm
- Mount Nokogiri
- Tokyo Bay Kannon

== Notable people from Futtsu ==
- Kōichi Hamada, politician
- Yasukazu Hamada, politician
- Masaaki Hirano, food historian
- Kei Yasuda, musician, actress
- Yukana, voice actress
