= Kimitsu Station =

Railway station in Kimitsu, Chiba Prefecture, Japan

Kimitsu Station 君津駅
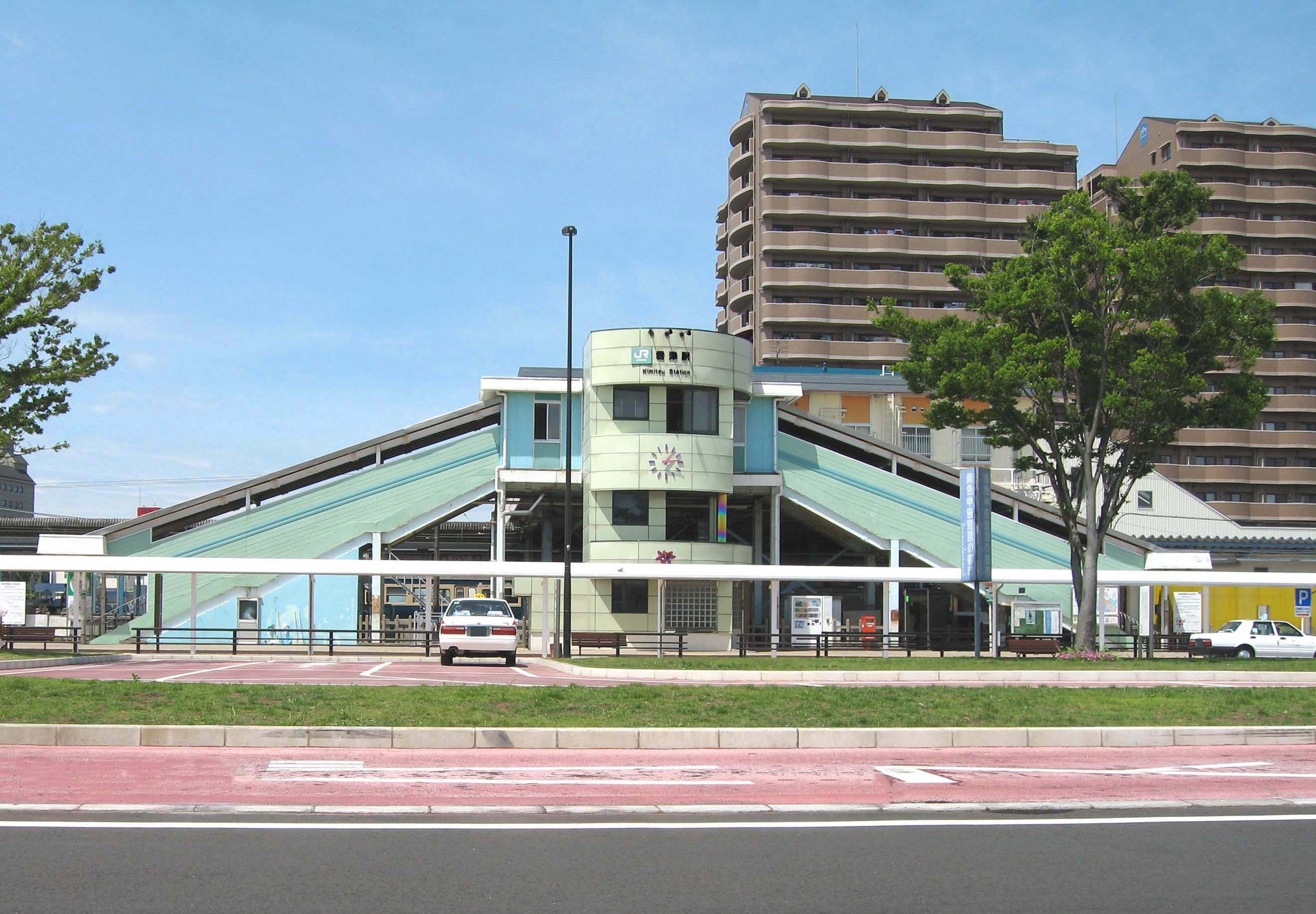
- Kimitsu Station in June 2007

General information
- Location: 1-1-1 Higashi-Sakata, Kimitsu-shi, Chiba-ken 299-1144; Japan
- Coordinates: 35°20′0.91″N 139°53′42.15″E
- Operator: JR East
- Line: ■ Uchibō Line
- Distance: 38.3 km from Soga
- Platforms: 1 side + island platform

Other information
- Status: Staffed ( "Midori no Madoguchi")
- Website: Official website

History
- Opened: January 15, 1915
- Former names: Susai (until 1956)

Passengers
- FY2019: 8003

Services
Preceding station	JR East	Following station
Kisarazu towards Tokyo	Sazanami	Terminus
Kisarazu towards Chiba	Uchibō Line Keiyō Rapid	Aohori towards Kazusa-Minato
Kisarazu towards Soga	Uchibō Line Sobū Rapid	Terminus
Kisarazu towards Soga or Chiba	Uchibō Line Local	Aohori towards Awa-Kamogawa
Location
- Location within Chiba Prefecture Location within Japan

Kimitsu Station (君津駅, Kimitsu-eki) is a passenger railway station in the city of Kimitsu, Chiba Prefecture, Japan, operated by the East Japan Railway Company (JR East).

== Lines ==
Kimitsu Station is served by the Uchibō Line, and is located 38.3 kilometres (23.8 mi) from the starting point of the line at Soga Station.

== Station layout ==
The station consists of an island platform and a side platform serving three tracks, connected to the station building by a footbridge. The station has a "Midori no Madoguchi" ticket counter.

=== Platforms ===
1	■ Uchibō Line	for Tateyama and Awa-Kamogawa
2,3	■ Uchibō Line	for Kisarazu, Soga, and Chiba

== History ==
The station opened on January 15, 1915, as Susai Station (周西駅) on the Japanese Government Railways (JGR) Kisarazu Line. On May 24, 1919, the line was renamed the Hōjō Line, on April 15, 1929, it became the Bōsō Line, and on April 1, 1933, it became the Bōsōnishi Line. It became part of the Japanese National Railways (JNR) after World War II. The station was renamed to Kimitsu Station on April 1, 1956, and the line was renamed the Uchibō Line from July 15, 1972. Kimitsu Station was absorbed into the JR East network upon the privatization of JNR on April 1, 1987.

== Passenger statistics ==
In fiscal 2019, the station was used by an average of 8003 passengers daily (boarding passengers only).

== Surrounding area ==
- Kimitsu City Hall
- National Route 16
- National Route 127

== See also ==
- List of railway stations in Japan
