= List of mergers in Chiba Prefecture =

Here is a list of mergers in Chiba Prefecture, Japan since the Heisei era.

== Mergers from April 1, 1999 to Present ==
- On April 1, 2001 - the town of Shiroi (leaving from Inba District) was elevated to city status.
- On April 1, 2002 - the town of Tomisato (leaving from Inba District) was elevated to city status.
- On June 6, 2003 - the town of Sekiyado (from Higashikatsushika District) was merged into the expanded city of Noda. (Merger information page)
- On February 11, 2005 - the town of Amatsukominato (from Awa District) was merged into the expanded city of Kamogawa.
- On March 28, 2005 - the town of Shōnan (from Higashikatsushika District) was merged into the expanded city of Kashiwa. Higashikatsushika District was dissolved as a result of this merger. (Merger information page)
- On July 1, 2005 - the old city of Asahi absorbed the town of Hikata (from Katori District), and the towns of Iioka and Unakami (both from Kaijō District) to create the new and expanded city of Asahi. Kaijō District was dissolved as a result of this merger. (Merger information page)
- On December 5, 2005 - the town of Isumi absorbed the towns of Misaki and Ōhara (all from Isumi District) to create the city of Isumi.
- On January 23, 2006 - the city of Yōkaichiba was merged with the town of Nosaka (from Sōsa District) to create the city of Sōsa.
- On March 20, 2006 - the towns of Chikura, Maruyama, Shirahama, Tomiura, Tomiyama and Wada, and the village of Miyoshi (all from Awa District) were merged to create the city of Minamibōsō.
- On March 27, 2006 - the towns of Shimofusa and Taiei (both from Katori District) were merged into the expanded city of Narita.
- On March 27, 2006 - the city of Sawara absorbed the towns of Kurimoto, Omigawa and Yamada (all from Katori District) to create the city of Katori.
- On March 27, 2006 - the towns of Matsuo, Narutō and Sanbu, and the village of Hasunuma (all from Sanbu District) were merged to create the city of Sanmu.
- On March 27, 2006 - the town of Hikari (from Sōsa District), and the town of Yokoshiba (from Sanbu District) were merged to create the town of Yokoshibahikari (in Sanbu District). Sōsa District was dissolved as a result of this merger.
- On March 23, 2010 - the villages of Inba and Motono (both from Inba District) were merged into the expanded city of Inzai.
- On January 1, 2013 - the town of Ōamishirasato (leaving from Sanbu District) was elevated to city status.
