= Asai District, Chiba =

Former district in Chiba prefecture, Japan

Asai District (朝夷郡, Asai-gun) was an administrative district of Japan located in central Awa Province, where Chiba Prefecture is today. Its name was also written with the alternative kanji 朝平郡, with the same pronunciation.

== History ==
Asai District was one of the four districts created in former Awa Province on April 1, 1889. The district had 63 villages, 27 of which were formerly tenryō territory directly controlled by the Tokugawa shogunate or hatamoto retainers, and the remaining 36 of which were formerly exclaves of feudal domains from around the Kantō region. The largest single landholder in the area was Maebashi Domain of Kōzuke Province. After the Meiji Restoration, a large portion of the district came under the control of the short-lived Nagao Domain.

On April 1, 1897, Asai District was merged into Awa District, Chiba and was subsequently divided between the towns of Shirahama, Chikura, Wada and Maruyama. The entire area is now part of the modern city of Minamibōsō with the single exception for former Emi Village, which merged with the city of Kamogawa in 1971.
