= Osamu Suzuki (screenwriter) =

Japanese television writer and screenwriter

- 鈴木 おさむ
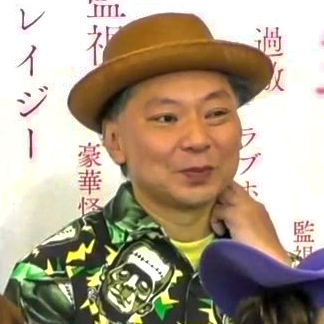
- Suzuki in 2019
- Born: 25 April 1972 (age 54); Chikura (now Minamibōsō), Awa District, Chiba, Japan
- Other name: Sumasuma Suzuki (pseudonym)
- Occupations: Television writer; screenwriter; lyricist; radio personality; tarento

Osamu Suzuki (鈴木 おさむ, 鈴木 収, Suzuki Osamu; born 25 April 1972, in Chikura (now Minamibōsō), Awa District, Chiba) is a Japanese television writer, screenwriter, lyricist, radio personality, and tarento. Since 2014, he has also been involved in organizing the Hakuhō Cup, a sumo tournament for children.

Suzuki's pseudonym is Sumasuma Suzuki (すますま・すずき).

== Current appearances ==
=== Tokyo Broadcasting System ===
Title
Masahiro Nakai no Kinyōbi no Smile-tachi e
Goro Deluxe

=== Fuji Television ===
Year	Title	Notes	Ref.
	SMAP×SMAP	Appeared in the Special Edition	
	Mecha-Mecha Iketeru!	As Sumasuma Suzuki	
	Oja Map!!		
	Kis-My Busaiku!?		
	Summers no Kamigi Toi		
2016	Jōdan Techō	Regular appearances	

=== TV Asahi ===
Title
SmaStation!!
Quiz Present Variety: Q-sama!!
Onegai! Ranking
Masahiro Nakai no Mi ni naru Toshokan
Oterasan Variety: Butchake Tera
Hashishita × Hatori no Bangumi
Kaerema Sunday
Kis-Mileage
Nara ≃ Deki: Marumaru nara ×× Dekiru hazu
Update Daigaku

=== Screenplays ===
TV drama

Year	Title	Network	Notes
2002	Hito ni yasashiku	Fuji TV	Co-written with Yoshihiro Izumi
2003	Watashi Umi	Fuji TV	Co-written with Koji Ishi
2003	Love Judge	TBS	
2003	Victory! Foot Girls no Seishun	Fuji TV	
2004	Nijū Seikatsu	Fuji TV	
2004	Be-Bop High School	TBS	
2006	Waraeru Koi wa shitakunai	TBS	
2007	Yama Onna Kabe Onna	Fuji TV	
2011	Umareru.	TBS	
2012	Girls Talk: Jū-ri no Sister-tachi	TV Asahi	
2013	Amaō no Kyōkan School	TV Asahi	
2015	Renai aru aru.	Fuji TV	

TV anime

Year	Title	Network	Notes
2009	Kimba the White Lion	Fuji TV	First anime screenplay

Films

Year	Title	Notes
	Mirai Nikki	
	Too Much Dutters	
2006	Love Com	
2007	Hoodwinked!	Dubbing supervisor
2008	Handsome Suits	
2015	Shinjuku Swan	Co-written with Rikiya Mizushima

Anime films

Year	Title
2012	One Piece Film: Z

Stage

Year	Title	Notes	Ref.
2012	Miyuki: Anne Conditional Love	Also producer	
2017	Boku Datte Hero ni Naritakatta		
2018	Kare Phone		
2019	Bokura wa Jinsei de Ikkai Dake Mahō ga Tsukaeru		
2021	Moshimo Inochi ga Egaketara		

Others

Year	Title	Notes
2006	Cherry Girl	DVD drama

== Discography ==
=== SMAP ===
Title	Album
"Jarajara Japan: for the Japanese"	S map: SMAP 014
"Five Respect"	Smap 015 / Drink! Smap!
"Jikan yotomare"	Smap 015 / Drink! Smap!
"SMAP no Positive Dance"	We are SMAP!

=== Others ===
Title	Notes	Ref.
Sanpei "Sanpei no 39 days"	Single "Sanpei Days"	
Eiko Matsumoto "Boku wa Baka"	Album Catharsis	
Jikyū 800-en "Shinu hodo anata ga Sukidakara"		
Jikyū 800-en "Tamani wa Naitemoīdesuka?"		
Jikyū 800-en "Sakura iro"		
Miyu "Mirai ga nakute mo Dakishimete"		
Mai "Beautiful Mind"		
Killers "Kirin no hanashi"		
Momoko Kikuchi "Japanese Girl"		
"Seishun Love Letter"	Album Seishun Love Letter: 30th Celebration Best	
Minamibōsō Municipal Chikura Elementary School song		
Kis-My-Ft2 "Thank You Jan!"		

== Advertisements ==
Title	Notes
Funwari New Beads	Co-starred with his wife Miyuki Oshima
Yasashī o Su	Co-starred with his wife Miyuki Oshima
Ameba	Interviewer

== Music videos ==
Title	Notes
SunSet Swish "Asunaro"	Appeared in a photo with his wife
Ayumi Sakai "Yokogao"	First directing

== Live ==
Year	Title	Notes
1999	The Secret Live	
2003	The Osamu Show	
2006	Damenzu Wo: Ka	
2006	Usukawa Ichi-mai	Configuration and produced
2007	Uwasa no Hospital: Taiyō no Komachi, Angel	Configuration and produced
2008	Jinjō Ningen Zero	Configuration and produced
2008	Haruko Book Center	Adopted and directed
2008	Hōsō Sakka Osamu Suzuki no Geinin o Miai: Nakayoku nari ma Show	

== Bibliography ==
Year	Title	Notes	Ref.
	Ikegaki to Cover Plants		
	Takegaki no Design		
	Medamayaki ni Ketchup Zengi 15-bu Yasetai? Īe. Nihon Shin Kokuseichōsa		
	Yakunitatsu! Sekkaku Kaitanoni Hito ni Kirawa Rete Shimatta Mail Bunrei-shū Worst 50		
	Hito ni yasashiku	Novelization	
	Busu no Hitomi ni Koishiteru		
	Osamu Suzuki no Mune Kyun Tanka		
	3-Nichi de Kekkon dekiru Onna ni naru Hōhō		
	Haikei Aishiki Hito e	Contributed with Mariko Hayashi	
	Handsome Suits		
	TV no namida		
	Geinin Kōkan Nikki: Yellow Hearts no Monogatari		
2015	Ninkatsu Diary: From Busu Koi		

=== Others ===
Year	Title	Network
2009	Kagai Jugyō Yōkoso Senpai	NHK
2010	Studio Park kara konnichiwa	NHK

== See also ==
- Mitsuyoshi Takasu
