= Tomiyama, Chiba =

Tomiyama 富山町
- Former municipality
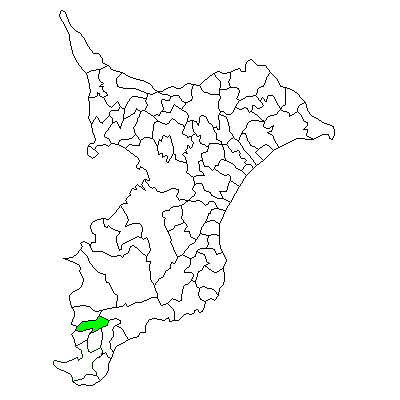
- Location of Tomiyama in Chiba Prefecture

- Location in Japan
- Coordinates: 35°01′59″N 139°58′22″E
- Country: Japan
- Region: Kantō
- Prefecture: Chiba Prefecture
- District: Awa
- Merged: March 20, 2006 (now part of Minamibōsō)

Area
  - Total: 40.34 km^{2} (15.58 sq mi)

Population (March 20, 2006)
  - Total: 5,841
  - Density: 145/km^{2} (380/sq mi)
- Time zone: UTC+09:00 (JST)
- Symbols
- Bird: Japanese white-eye
- Flower: Rosemary
- Tree: Hinoki

Tomiyama (富山町, Tomiyama-chō) was a town located in Awa District, Chiba Prefecture, Japan.

As of March 20, 2006, the town had an estimated population of 5,841 and a density of 145 persons per km^{2}. The total area was 40.34 km^{2}.

== Geography ==
Tomiyama was located at the southwestern end of Chiba Prefecture, in an inland area of the southern Bōsō Peninsula, with a small shoreline facing the entrance to Tokyo Bay on the Pacific Ocean. The town had a temperate maritime climate with hot, humid summers and mild winters.

== History ==
The area around Tomiyama was the setting of the Nansō Satomi Hakkenden, an epic novel by Edo period author Kyokutei Bakin. Tomiyama Town was created on February 11, 1955, from the merger of former Iwai Town and Heguri Village.

On March 20, 2006, Tomiyama, along with the towns of Chikura, Maruyama, Shirahama, Tomiura and Wada, and the village of Miyoshi (all from Awa District), was merged to create the city of Minamibōsō.

== Economy ==
The economy of Tomiyama was largely based on horticulture (primarily herbs and flowers), and summer tourism.

== Transportation ==
=== Highway ===
- Japan National Route 127

== Railway ==
- JR East – Uchibō Line
  - Iwai
