= Nagasa District, Chiba =

Administrative district of Japan

Nagasa District (長狭郡, Nagasa-gun) was an administrative district of Japan located in southern Chiba Prefecture.

== History ==
Nagasa District was one of the four districts created in former Awa Province on April 1, 1889. Much of the area of the district was part of the former Hanabusa Domain. At the time of its foundation, the district consisted of two towns (Kamogawa and Amatsu) and nine villages. On April 1, 1897, Nagasa District was merged into Awa District, Chiba.
