= Japan National Route 410 =

National highway in Chiba Prefecture, Japan

National Route 410
- 国道410号
- National Route 410 highlighted in red

Route information
- Length: 110.4 km (68.6 mi)
- Existed: 1 April 1982–present

Major junctions
- South end: National Route 127 / National Route 128 in Tateyama
- National Route 465; Ken-Ō Expressway; National Route 409; Tateyama Expressway; Tokyo Bay Aqua-Line
- North end: National Route 16 in Kisarazu

Location
- Country: Japan

Highway system
- National highways of Japan; Expressways of Japan
← National Route 409	→ National Route 411

National Route 410 (国道410号, Kokudō Yonhyakujūgō) is a national highway located entirely within Chiba Prefecture, Japan. It connects the cities of Tateyama and Kisarazu, spanning the Bōsō Peninsula in a south–north routing. The highway has a total length of 110.4 kilometers (68.6 mi).

== Route description ==
National Route 410 connects the cities of Tateyama and Kisarazu, spanning Chiba Prefecture's Bōsō Peninsula in a south–north routing. Its southern terminus lies at a junction with National Route 127 and National Route 128 in central Tateyama. It travels south from there towards the southern tip of the Bōsō Peninsula, Cape Nojima. Upon reaching the cape, the highway begins curving to the north heading through Minamibōsō and the former town of Chikura. It has another junction with National Route 128 in the former town of Maruyama, sharing a brief concurrency with the route before continuing north into the city of Kamogawa. The highway has a total length of 110.4 kilometers (68.6 mi).

== History ==
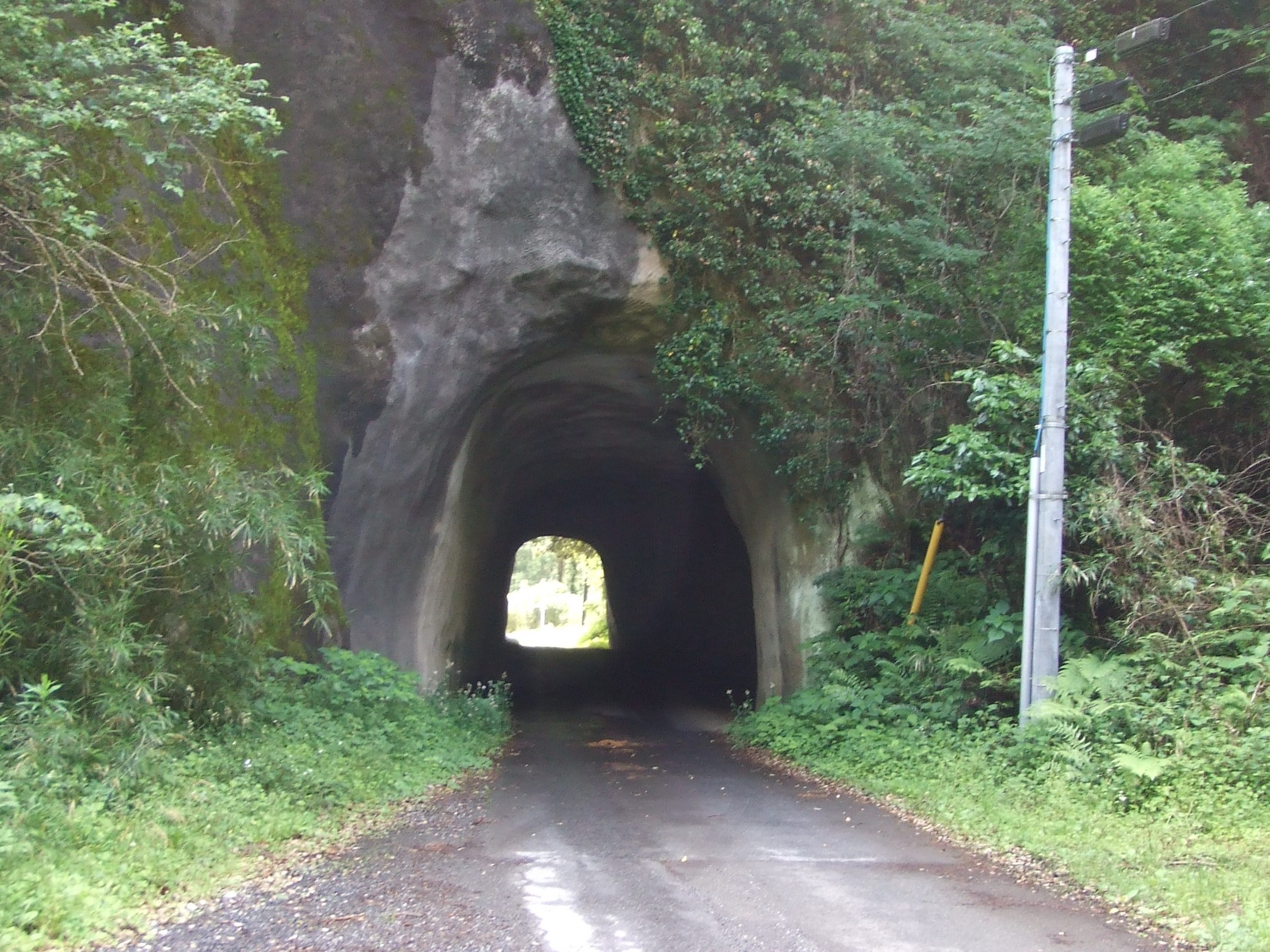
Yomachisaku Daiichi Tunnel

In 1902, the Yomachisaku Daiichi Tunnel (四町作第一隧道, Yomachisaku Daiichi Zuidō) was completed using only hand tools along what would become National Route 410 in the city of Kimitsu. The tunnel is the second oldest tunnel that is designated as a part of a national highway in Japan.

National Route 410 was established by the Cabinet of Japan in 1982. Construction began on the Kururi–Makuta Bypass of the narrow sections of the highway including the Yomachisaku Daiichi Tunnel in 1989. The 10.7-kilometer-long (6.6 mi) bypass was scheduled to be completed by 2015, but as of 2021, the bypass has yet to be completed. On 23 December 2015, a 20-meter-long (66 ft) section of the Yomachisaku Daiichi Tunnel's shotcrete lining collapsed following a re-application of the supportive lining a month prior to the collapse. The tunnel lining was repaired by the following day.

== Major intersections ==
The route lies entirely within Chiba Prefecture.

Location	km	mi	Destinations	Notes
Tateyama	0.0	0.0	National Route 127 north (Tateyama Bypass) – Chiba, Kisarazu; National Route 128 (Sotobō–Kuroshio Line) – Tateyama Station, central Tateyama, Kamogawa, Minamibōsō	Southern terminus; highway continues north as National Route 127
Tateyama	1.3	0.81	Chiba Prefecture Route 188 east – Chikura	
Tateyama	1.5	0.93	Chiba Prefecture Route 86 – Shirahama, central Tateyama	
Tateyama	2.3	1.4	National Route 410 north (Hōjō Bypass) – Central Tateyama, Shiroyama Park, Oki no Shima	
Tateyama	9.8	6.1	Chiba Prefecture Route 257 north (Bōsō Flower Line) – Sunozaki	
Tateyama	10.0	6.2	Chiba Prefecture Route 252 south – Tomisaki Fishing Port	
Minamibōsō	15.9	9.9	Chiba Prefecture Route 86 north – Tateyama, Shirahama	
Minamibōsō	29.1	18.1	Chiba Prefecture Route 187 west – to Futtsu Tateyama Road, Tateyama, Chikura Station	
Minamibōsō	29.2	18.1	Chiba Prefecture Route 251 south – Chikura-Seaside	
Minamibōsō	30.3	18.8	Chiba Prefecture Route 241 west – Chikura Station	
Minamibōsō	32.8	20.4	Chiba Prefecture Route 297 north – Kamogawa, Rosemary Park	
Minamibōsō	35.5	22.1	National Route 128 north (Sotobō–Kuroshio Line) – Kamogawa	Southern end of National Route 128 concurrency
Minamibōsō	36.1	22.4	National Route 128 south (Sotobō–Kuroshio Line) – to Futtsu Tateyama Road, Tateyama	Northern end of National Route 128 concurrency
Minamibōsō	38.3	23.8	Chiba Prefecture Route 296 – to Futtsu Tateyama Road, Funakata, Wada	
Minamibōsō	41.1	25.5	Chiba Prefecture Route 258 west – Masuma	
Minamibōsō	46.1	28.6	Chiba Prefecture Route 89 west – Iwai	Southern end of Chiba Prefecture Route 89 concurrency
Minamibōsō	47.8	29.7	Chiba Prefecture Route 89 east – Kamogawa	Northern end of Chiba Prefecture Route 89 concurrency
Kamogawa	53.2	33.1	Chiba Prefecture Route 34 (Nagasa Kaidō) – Hota, central Kamogawa	
Kimitsu	65.4	40.6	National Route 465 west – Central Kimitsu, Kisarazu, Futtsu	Southern end of National Route 465 concurrency
Kimitsu	74.0	46.0	National Route 465 east / Chiba Prefecture Route 24 south (Kururi Kaidō)	Northern end of National Route 465 concurrency, southern end of Chiba Prefecture Route 24 concurrency
Kimitsu	81.8	50.8	Chiba Prefecture Route 32 east – Ōtaki; Chiba Prefecture Route 93 west – Futtsu	
Kimitsu	82.2	51.1	Chiba Prefecture Route 145 north – Kisarazu	
Kimitsu	84.1	52.3	National Route 410 (Kururi–Makuta Bypass)	Large trucks are prohibited from going south on the Kururi–Makuta Bypass
Kimitsu	84.5	52.5	Chiba Prefecture Route 163 west – Kisarazu	
Kimitsu	86.3	53.6	Chiba Prefecture Route 23 west – Kisarazu, Kazusa Akademia Park, Obitsu Station	
Kimitsu	86.5	53.7	Chiba Prefecture Route 160 east – Itabu, Kururi Castle	Southern end of Chiba Prefecture Route 160 concurrency
Kimitsu	87.1	54.1	National Route 410 south (Kururi–Makuta Bypass) – Kisarazu, Kamogawa, Kururi; Chiba Prefecture Route 160 ends	Northern end of Chiba Prefecture Route 160 concurrency
Kisarazu	90.0	55.9	Chiba Prefecture Route 166 – Shimogōri, Makuta	
Kisarazu	90.6	56.3	Ken-Ō Expressway – to Tokyo Bay Aqua-Line, Tateyama Expressway, Chōshi, Mobara	Kisarazu-higashi Interchange (C4 exit 105)
Kisarazu	92.3	57.4	Chiba Prefecture Route 167 – to Tateyama Expressway, Kisarazu, Makuta	One-quadrant interchange
Sodegaura	93.7	58.2	National Route 409 east (Bōsō Ōdan-dōro) – Mobara, Ushiku; Chiba Prefecture Route 24 north – to Tateyama Expressway, Chiba, Ichihara	Northern end of Chiba Prefecture Route 24 concurrency, southern end of National Route 409 concurrency
Sodegaura	95.8	59.5	Chiba Prefecture Route 165 east – Ichihara, Katsuura; Chiba Prefecture Route 167 south – Kururi	Southern end of Chiba Prefecture Route 165 concurrency
Sodegaura	96.9	60.2	Chiba Prefecture Route 145 south – Kimitsu, Kazusa Akademia Park	Southern end of Chiba Prefecture Route 145 concurrency
Sodegaura	97.2	60.4	Chiba Prefecture Route 145 north – Nagaura	Northern end of Chiba Prefecture Route 145 concurrency
Sodegaura	97.4	60.5	Chiba Prefecture Route 165 west – Yokota Station	Northern end of Chiba Prefecture Route 165 concurrency
Sodegaura	99.2	61.6	Chiba Prefecture Route 33 south – Kimitsu, Kazusa Akademia Park	
Kisarazu	99.6	61.9	Tateyama Expressway – to Tokyo Bay Aqua-Line, Ken-Ō Expressway, Tateyama, Chiba	Kisarazu-kita Interchange (E14 exit 15)
Kisarazu	99.2	61.6	Chiba Prefecture Route 33 south – Kimitsu, Kazusa Akademia Park	
Kisarazu	102.7	63.8	National Route 410 north (Bōsō Ōdan-dōro) – Central Kisarazu	Partial interchange; northbound entrance, southbound exit
Kisarazu	103.2	64.1	Chiba Prefecture Route 146 – Central Kisarazu, Sodegaura	
Sodegaura	105.0	65.2	Tokyo Bay Aqua-Line – to Tateyama Expressway, Keiyō Road, Chiba	Sodegaura Interchange (CA exit 3); northbound entrance, southbound exit
Sodegaura	105.2	65.4	National Route 16 – Tateyama, Kisarazu, Chiba, Ichihara; National Route 409 west – to Tokyo Bay Aqua-Line, Kawasaki, Tokyo	National Route 410 reverses here
Sodegaura	105.4	65.5	Tokyo Bay Aqua-Line – to Tateyama Expressway, Keiyō Road, Chiba	Sodegaura Interchange (CA exit 3); northbound entrance, southbound exit
Kisarazu	107.2	66.6	Chiba Prefecture Route 146 – Central Kisarazu, Sodegaura	
Kisarazu	108.0	67.1	National Route 409 east / National Route 410 south (Bōsō Ōdan-dōro) – Central Kisarazu	Partial interchange; northbound entrance, southbound exit, northern end of National Route 409 concurrency
Kisarazu	108.6	67.5	Chiba Prefecture Route 146 north – Sodegaura	
Kisarazu	110.4	68.6	National Route 16 (Wangan-dōro) – to Tokyo Bay Aqua-Line, Tateyama, Chiba; Chiba Prefecture Route 90 west (Bōsō Ōdan-dōro) – Kisarazu Port, central Kisarazu	Northern terminus; interchange; highway continues west as Chiba Prefecture Route 90
1.000 mi = 1.609 km; 1.000 km = 0.621 mi: Concurrency terminus; Incomplete access; Route transition
