= Chiba 12th district =

Electoral constituency in Chiba Prefecture, Japan

- Parliamentary constituency for the Japanese House of Representatives
- Numbered map of the Chiba Prefecture single seats
- Prefecture: Chiba
- Proportional District: Southern Kanto
- Electorate: 374,529

Current constituency
- Created: 1994
- Seats: One
- Party: LDP
- Representatives: Yasukazu Hamada
- Municipalities: Cities of Futtsu, Kamogawa, Kimitsu, Kisarazu, Minamibōsō, Sodegaura, and Tateyama, District of Awa

Chiba 12th district (千葉県第12区, Chiba-ken dai-ju-niku or simply 千葉12区, Chiba-ju-niku) is a single-member constituency of the House of Representatives in the national Diet of Japan located in Chiba Prefecture.

== Areas covered ==
=== Since 2013 ===
- Futtsu
- Kamogawa
- Kimitsu
- Kisarazu
- Minamibōsō
- Sodegaura
- Tateyama
- Awa District

=== 1994 - 2013 ===
- Futtsu
- Kamogawa
- Kimitsu
- Kisarazu
- Sodegaura
- Tateyama
- Awa District

== List of representatives ==
Election	Representative	Party	Notes
1996	Yasukazu Hamada	LDP	
2000	Shozaburo Nakamura	LDP	
2003	Yasukazu Hamada	LDP	
2005	Yasukazu Hamada	LDP	
2009	Yasukazu Hamada	LDP	
2012	Yasukazu Hamada	LDP	
2014	Yasukazu Hamada	LDP	
2017	Yasukazu Hamada	LDP	
2021	Yasukazu Hamada	LDP	
2024	Yasukazu Hamada	LDP	
2026	Yasukazu Hamada	LDP	

== Election results ==
=== 2026 ===
2026
Party	Candidate	Votes	%	±%
LDP	Yasukazu Hamada (Incumbent)	129,997	71.5	▲15.0
Independent	Yūya Ōsuki	34,270	18.8	
JCP	Shigeru Kuzuhara	17,601	9.7	▲4.2
Registered electors		368,887		
Turnout			52.29	▲0.54
LDP hold				

=== 2024 ===
2024
Party	Candidate	Votes	%	±%
LDP	Yasukazu Hamada (Incumbent)	105,510	56.50	▼7.51
CDP	Takeshi Hidaka	45,098	24.15	▼5.33
Ishin	Naoki Jibiki	25,882	13.86	New
JCP	Shigeru Kuzuhara	10,243	5.49	▼1.02
Majority		60,412	32.35	
Registered electors		373,552		
Turnout			51.75	▼0.45
LDP hold				

=== 2021 ===
2021
Party	Candidate	Votes	%	±%
LDP	Yasukazu Hamada (Incumbent)	123,210	64.01	▲0.66
CDP	Takeshi Hidaka	56,747	29.48	New
JCP	Shigeru Kuzuhara	12,530	6.51	▼5.19
Majority		66,463	34.53	
Registered electors		380,864		
Turnout			52.20	▲1.63
LDP hold				

=== 2017 ===
2017
Party	Candidate	Votes	%	±%
LDP	Yasukazu Hamada (Incumbent)	120,075	63.35	▼10.94
Kibō no Tō	Takeshi Hidaka	36,571	19.29	New
JCP	Wataru Ōnishi	22,182	11.70	▼14.01
Social Democratic	Shinichiro Minagawa	10,713	5.66	New
Majority		83,504	44.06	
Registered electors		387,875		
Turnout			50.57	▲0.36
LDP hold				

=== 2014 ===
2014
Party	Candidate	Votes	%	±%
LDP	Yasukazu Hamada (Incumbent)	134,037	74.29	▲9.11
JCP	Nobuhisa Yonemoto	46,397	25.71	▲18.13
Majority		87,640	48.58	
Registered electors		383,899		
Turnout			50.21	▼8.76
LDP hold				

=== 2012 ===
2012
Party	Candidate	Votes	%	±%
LDP	Yasukazu Hamada (Incumbent)	139,935	65.18	▲12.08
Tomorrow	Atsushi Chūgo	58,491	27.24	New
JCP	Nobuhisa Yonemoto	16,262	7.58	N/A
Majority		81,444	37.94	
Registered electors		385,319		
Turnout			58.97	▼7.95
LDP hold				

=== 2009 ===
2009
Party	Candidate	Votes	%	±%
LDP	Yasukazu Hamada (Incumbent)	134,298	53.10	▼4.52
Democratic	Atsushi Chūgo (Won PR seat)	114,921	45.44	▲8.32
Happiness Realization	Jotaro Tanabe	3,687	1.46	New
Majority		19,377	7.66	
Registered electors		385,658		
Turnout			66.92	▲0.66
LDP hold				

=== 2005 ===
2005
Party	Candidate	Votes	%	±%
LDP	Yasukazu Hamada (Incumbent)	143,780	57.62	▲3.69
Democratic	Ai Aoki	92,611	37.12	▼3.68
JCP	Yasushiro Kamoshida	13,129	5.26	▼0.01
Majority		51,169	20.50	
Registered electors		386,093		
Turnout			66.26	▲8.38
LDP hold				

=== 2003 ===
2003
Party	Candidate	Votes	%	±%
LDP	Yasukazu Hamada	115,708	53.93	▼4.70
Democratic	Ai Aoki (Won PR seat)	87,522	40.80	▲14.03
JCP	Yasushiro Kamoshida	11,303	5.27	▼3.32
Majority		28,186	13.13	
Registered electors		386,347		
Turnout			57.88	▼0.89
LDP hold				

=== 2000 ===
2000
Party	Candidate	Votes	%	±%
LDP	Shozaburo Nakamura	124,966	58.63	▲4.59
Democratic	Zenzo Handa	57,064	26.77	New
JCP	Yasushiro Kamoshida	18,305	8.59	▼5.19
Liberal League	Hideyasu Murata	12,804	6.01	New
Majority		67,902	31.86	
Registered electors		384,578		
Turnout			58.77	
LDP hold				

=== 1996 ===
1996
Party	Candidate	Votes	%	±%
LDP	Yasukazu Hamada	102,570	54.04	New
Democratic	Megumi Morita	61,083	26.77	New
JCP	Kinichi Kawakami	26,149	13.78	New
Majority		41,487	27.27	
Registered electors				
Turnout				
LDP win (new seat)				
