= 房州 =

房州 may refer to:

- Awa Province (Chiba), abbreviated name was following Bōshū (房州), province of Japan located in what is today Chiba Prefecture
- Fang Prefecture, province of ancient China located in what is today Shiyan, Hubei
