= Tomisan Prefectural Natural Park =

Natural park of Chiba prefecture, Japan

- 県立富山自然公園
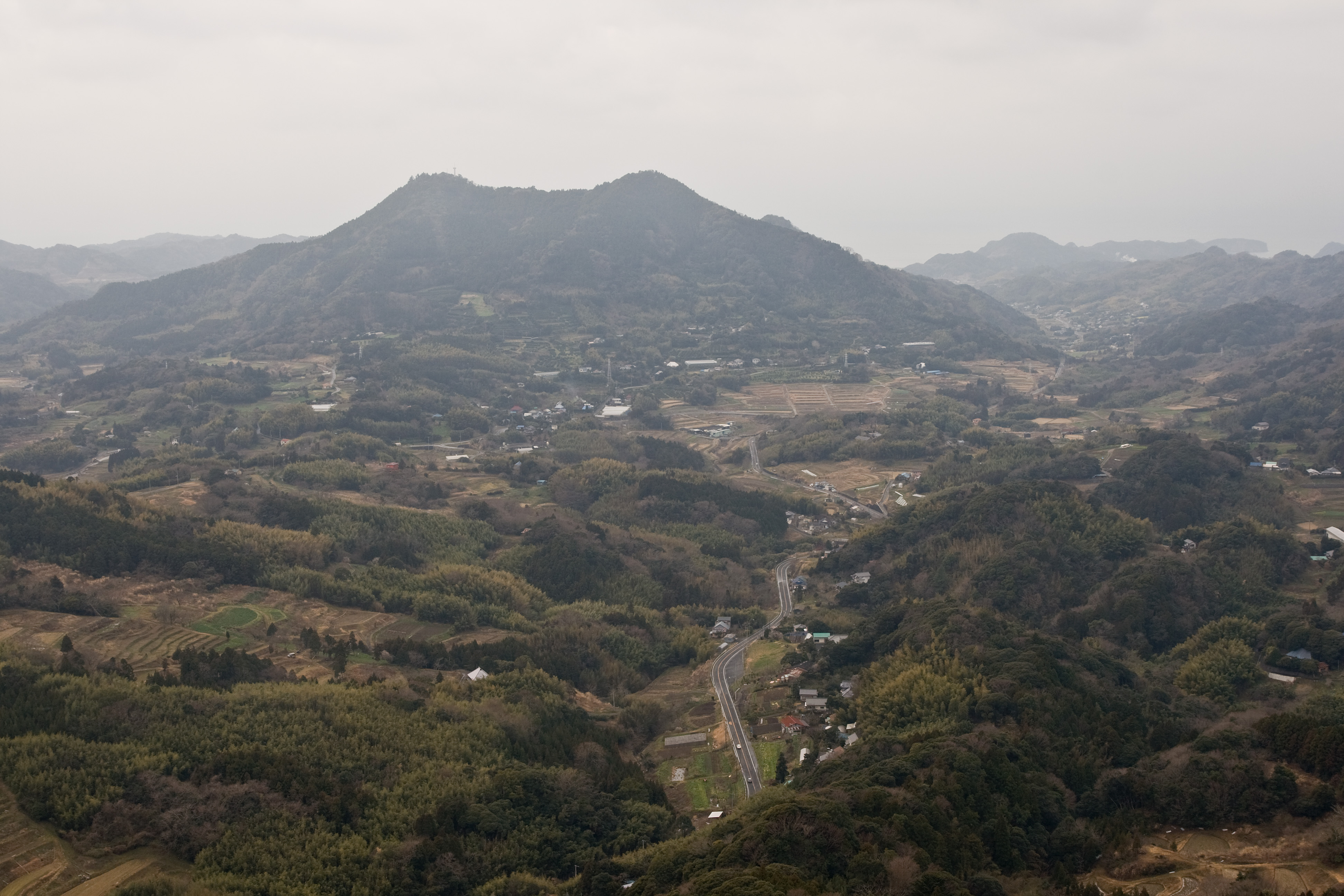
- Mount Tomi
- Interactive map of Tomisan Prefectural Natural Park
- Location: Chiba Prefecture, Japan
- Coordinates: 35°05′56″N 139°52′53″E
- Area: 6.76 km^{2} (2.61 sq mi)
- Established: 3 March 1951

Tomisan Prefectural Natural Park (県立富山自然公園, Kenritsu Tomisan shizen kōen) is a Prefectural Natural Park in southern Chiba Prefecture, Japan. First designated for protection in 1951, the park's central feature is Mount Tomi. The park is wholly within the municipality of Minamibōsō.

== See also ==
- National Parks of Japan
