= Hei District, Chiba =

Former district in Chiba prefecture, Japan

Hei District (平郡, Hei-gun) was an administrative district of Japan located in southern Chiba Prefecture. During and before the Edo period, the district was called Heguri District (平群郡, Heguri-gun). In present-day Chiba, there is still an area within Minamibōsō city called Heguri.

== History ==
Hei District was one of the four modern districts created in former Awa Province on April 1, 1889. Much of the area of the district was formerly under the control of various minor feudal domains of former Nagao Domain (38 villages), Nishio Domain (11 villages), Awa-Katsuyama Domain (9 villages), shared between Awa-Katsuyama and Nagao (13 villages) and under direct central government control (4 villages).

At the time of its modern creation, the district consisted of eleven villages. The town of Nago was proclaimed in 1893, Katsuyama in 1896 and Hota in 1897. On April 1, 1897 Hei District was merged into Awa District, Chiba.

The area of former Hei District covered all of modern Kyonan and portions of Tateyama and Minamibōsō.
