= Tomiura, Chiba =

Tomiura 富浦町
- Former municipality
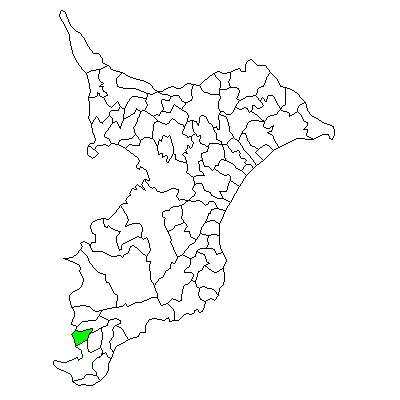
- Location of Tomiura in Chiba Prefecture

- Location in Japan
- Coordinates: 35°02′N 139°50′E
- Country: Japan
- Region: Kantō
- Prefecture: Chiba Prefecture
- District: Awa
- Merged: March 20, 2006 (now part of Minamibōsō)

Area
  - Total: 25.69 km^{2} (9.92 sq mi)

Population (March 20, 2006)
  - Total: 5,689
  - Density: 221/km^{2} (570/sq mi)
- Time zone: UTC+09:00 (JST)
- Symbols
- Flower: Brassica napus
- Tree: Loquat

Tomiura (富浦町, Tomiura-chō) was a town located in Awa District, Chiba Prefecture, Japan.

As of March 20, 2006, the town had an estimated population of 5,698 and a density of 221 persons per km^{2}. The total area was 25.69 km^{2}.

== Geography ==
Tomiura was located at the southwest end of Chiba Prefecture, facing the entrance to Tokyo Bay on the Pacific Ocean. The town had a temperate maritime climate with hot, humid summers and mild, cool winters.

== History ==
Tomiura Village was created on April 1, 1889 within Hei District, which became part of Awa District from April 1, 1897. Tomiura became a town on April 11, 1933. On March 31, 1955, Tomiura absorbed the neighboring village of Yatsuka.

On March 20, 2006, Tomiura, along with the towns of Chikura, Maruyama, Shirahama, Tomiyama and Wada, and the village of Miyoshi (all from Awa District), was merged to create the city of Minamibōsō.

== Economy ==
The economy of Tomiua was largely based on commercial fishing, horticulture (primarily loquats, and summer tourism.

== Transportation ==
=== Highway ===
- Japan National Route 127

=== Railway ===
- JR East – Uchibō Line
  - Tomiura
