= Chitose Station (Chiba) =

Railway station in Minamibōsō, Chiba Prefecture, Japan

Chitose Station 千歳駅
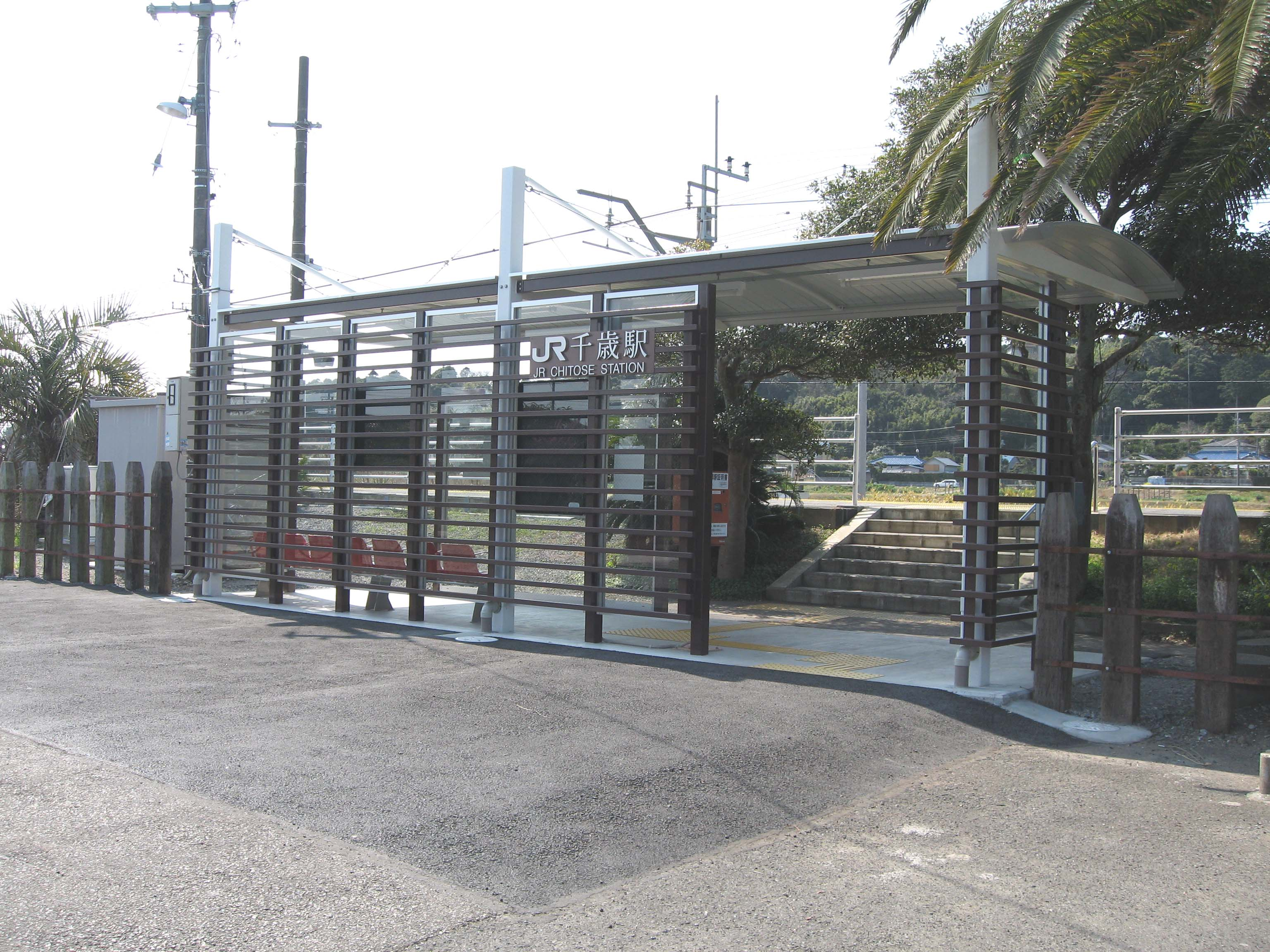
- Chitose Station in 2007

General information
- Location: Chikura-chō Shirako 524, Minamibōsō-shi, Chiba-ken 295-0003; Japan
- Coordinates: 34°59′29″N 139°57′59″E
- Operator: JR East
- Line: ■ Uchibō Line
- Distance: 98.6 km from Soga
- Platforms: 1 side platform

Other information
- Status: Unstaffed
- Website: Official website

History
- Opened: August 1, 1930

Passengers
- FY2006: 94

Services
Preceding station	JR East	Following station
Chikura towards Soga or Chiba	Uchibō Line Local	Minamihara towards Awa-Kamogawa
Location
- Location within Chiba Prefecture Location within Japan

Chitose Station (千歳駅, Chitose-eki) is a passenger railway station in the city of Minamibōsō, Chiba Prefecture, Japan, operated by the East Japan Railway Company (JR East).

== Lines ==
Chitose Station is served by the Uchibō Line, and is located 98.6 km from the western terminus of the line at Soga Station.

== Station layout ==
The station is an at-grade station with a single side platform serving bidirectional traffic. The station is unattended.

== History ==
Chitose Station was opened on May 20, 1927 as a temporary stop. It was elevated to a full station on August 1, 1930. The station was absorbed into the JR East network upon the privatization of the Japan National Railways (JNR) on April 1, 1987. A new station building was completed in February 2007.

== Passenger statistics ==
In fiscal 2006, the station was used by an average of 62 passengers daily.

== Surrounding area ==
- National Route 410
- Chikura onsen

== See also ==
- List of railway stations in Japan
