= Tomiura Station (Chiba) =

Railway station in Minamibōsō, Chiba Prefecture, Japan

Tomiura Station 富浦駅
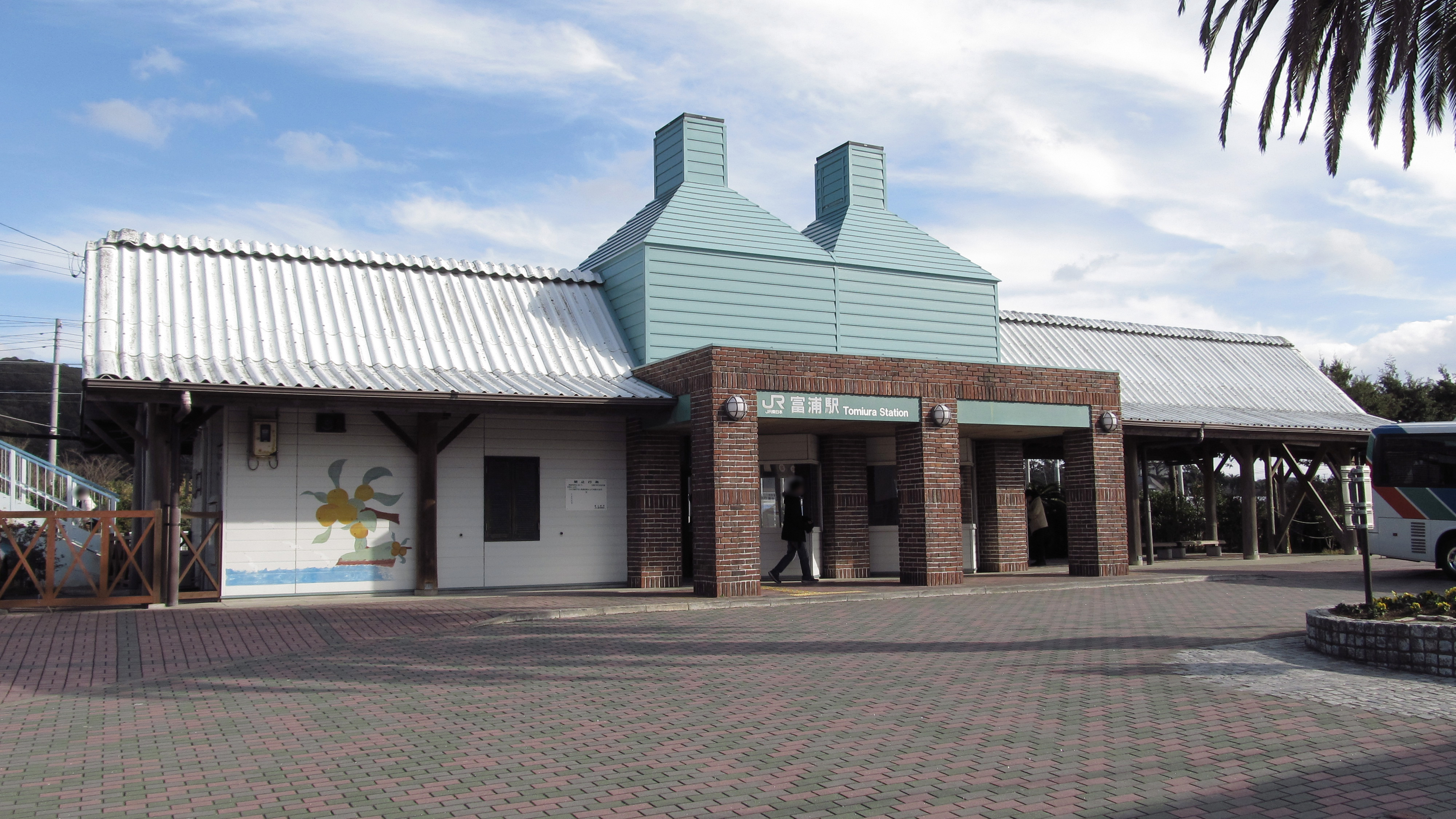
- Tomiura Station in December 2013

General information
- Location: Tomiura-chō Haraoka 451, Minamibōsō-shi, Chiba-ken 299-2403; Japan
- Coordinates: 35°02′43″N 139°50′16.26″E
- Operator: JR East
- Line: ■ Uchibō Line
- Distance: 79.8 km from Soga
- Platforms: 1 island platform

Other information
- Status: Staffed
- Website: Official website

History
- Opened: August 10, 1918

Passengers
- FY2019: 189

Services
| Preceding station | JR East | Following station |
|---|---|---|
| Iwai towards Soga or Chiba | Uchibō Line Local | Nakofunakata towards Awa-Kamogawa |
Location
- Location within Chiba Prefecture Location within Japan

Tomiura Station (富浦駅, Tomiura-eki) is a passenger railway station in the city of Minamibōsō, Chiba Prefecture, Japan, operated by the East Japan Railway Company (JR East).

== Lines ==
Tomiura Station is served by the Uchibō Line, and is located 79.8 km from the western terminus of the line at Soga Station.

== Station layout ==
The station is an at-grade station consisting of a single island platform connected to the station building by a footbridge. The station is a Kan'i itaku station, with point-of-sales terminal installed.

=== Platforms ===
| 1 | ■ Uchibō Line | for Kimitsu, Kisarazu, Chiba |
| 2 | ■ Uchibō Line | for Tateyama, Awa-Kamogawa |

== History ==
Tomiura Station was opened on August 10, 1918. The station was absorbed into the JR East network upon the privatization of the Japan National Railways (JNR) on April 1, 1987.

== Passenger statistics ==
In fiscal 2019, the station was used by an average of 189 passengers daily (boarding passengers only).

== Surrounding area ==
- National Route 127
- Former Tomiura Town Hall

== See also ==
- List of railway stations in Japan
