= CUCN =

Submarine telecommunications cable

China-US Cable Network (CUCN)
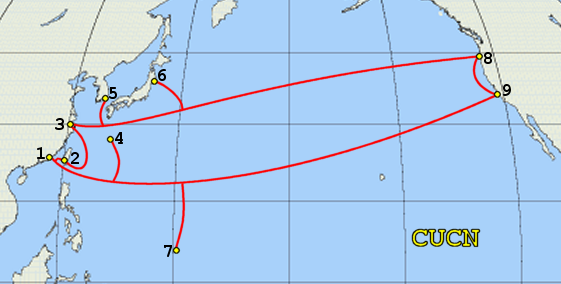
- Landing points: 1. Shantou, China; 2. Fangshan, Pingtung, Taiwan; 3. Chongming, Shanghai, China; 4. Okinawa Prefecture, Japan; 5. Pusan, South Korea; 6. Chikura, Chiba, Japan; 7. Tanguisson Point, Tamuning, Guam; 8. Bandon, Oregon, United States; 9. San Luis Obispo, California, United States
- Total length: 30.000 km
- Date of first use: 1999

CUCN or China-US Cable Network was a submarine telecommunications cable linking several countries in the Asia-Pacific region. It was retired from service in December 2016.

It has landing points in:

1. Shantou, Guangdong Province, China
2. Fangshan, Pingtung County, Taiwan
3. Chongming, Shanghai, China
4. Okinawa Prefecture, Japan
5. Pusan, South Korea
6. Chikura, Chiba Prefecture, Japan
7. Tanguisson Point, Tamuning Village, Guam (unincorporated territory of the United States)
8. Bandon, Coos County, Oregon, United States
9. San Luis Obispo, San Luis Obispo County, California, United States
