= Minamihara Station =

Railway station in Minamibōsō, Chiba Prefecture, Japan

Minamihara Station 南三原駅
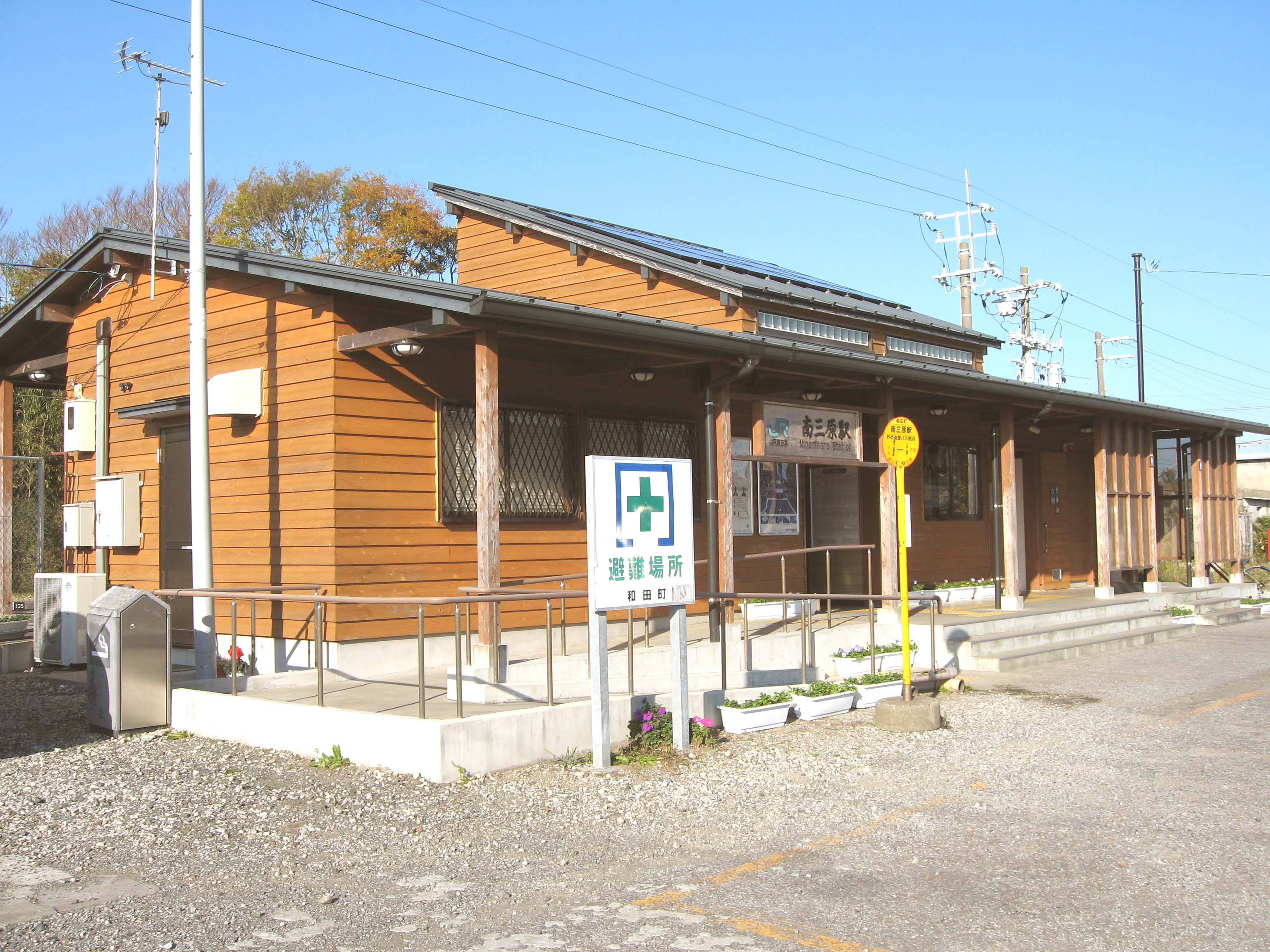
- Minamihara Station in December 2007

General information
- Location: Wada-chō Matsuda 148, Minamibōsō-shi, Chiba-ken 299-2713; Japan
- Coordinates: 35.0211°N 139.9794°E
- Operator: JR East
- Line: ■ Uchibō Line
- Distance: 102.2 km from Soga
- Platforms: 2 side platforms

Other information
- Status: Staffed
- Website: Official website

History
- Opened: June 1, 1921

Passengers
- FY2019: 453

Services
Preceding station	JR East	Following station
Chitose towards Soga or Chiba	Uchibō Line Local	Wadaura towards Awa-Kamogawa
Location
- Location within Chiba Prefecture Location within Japan

Minamihara Station (南三原駅, Minamihara-eki) is a passenger railway station in the city of Minamibōsō, Chiba Prefecture, Japan, operated by the East Japan Railway Company (JR East).

== Lines ==
Minamihara Station is served by the Uchibō Line, and is located 102.2 km from the western terminus of the line at Soga Station.

== Station layout ==
The station is an at-grade station with two sets of rails running between two opposing side platforms connected by a footbridge. The station is a Kan'i itaku station operated by the Minamibōsō municipal authority, with point-of-sales terminal installed.

=== Platforms ===
1	■ Uchibō Line	for Tateyama, Kimitsu, Kisarazu, Chiba
2	■ Uchibō Line	for Awa-Kamogawa

== History ==
Minamihara Station was opened on June 1, 1921. The station was absorbed into the JR East network upon the privatization of the Japan National Railways (JNR) on April 1, 1987. A new station building was completed in January 2003.

== Passenger statistics ==
In fiscal 2019, the station was used by an average of 453 passengers daily (boarding passengers only).

== Surrounding area ==
- National Route 126
- National Route 410
- Former Asahi Town Hall

== See also ==
- List of railway stations in Japan
