= Miyoshi, Chiba =

Miyoshi 三芳村
- Former municipality
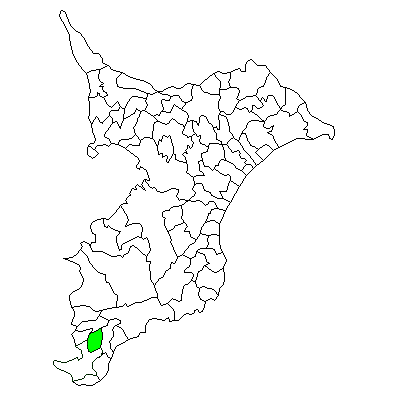
- Location of Miyoshi in Chiba Prefecture

- Location in Japan
- Coordinates: 35°01′47.67″N 139°53′42.38″E
- Country: Japan
- Region: Kantō
- Prefecture: Chiba Prefecture
- District: Awa
- Merged: March 20, 2006 (now part of Minamibōsō)

Area
  - Total: 33.92 km^{2} (13.10 sq mi)

Population (October 1, 2004)
  - Total: 4,560
  - Density: 135/km^{2} (350/sq mi)
- Time zone: UTC+09:00 (JST)
- Symbols
- Flower: Brassica napus
- Tree: Camellia

Miyoshi (三芳村, Miyoshi-mura) was a village located in Awa District, Chiba Prefecture, Japan.

As of March 20, 2006, the village had an estimated population of 4,560 and a density of 135 persons per km^{2}. The total area was 33.92 km^{2}.

== Geography ==
Shirahama was located at southern end of Chiba Prefecture, at the southern extremity of Bōsō Peninsula. It was an inland area, without access to the Pacific Ocean. The town had a temperate maritime climate with hot, humid summers and mild, cool winters.

== History ==
The name Miyoshi appears in Nara period records, and is believed to be the location of the original provincial capital of ancient Awa Province. The area is also part of the setting of the Edo period epic novel Nansō Satomi Hakkenden by Kyokutei Bakin.

The modern village of Miyoshi was created on May 1, 1953, through the merger of the villages of Takuta, Kokufu, and Inamiya.

On March 20, 2006, Miyoshi, along with the towns of Chikura, Maruyama, Shirahama, Tomiura, Tomiyama and Wada (all from Awa District), was merged to create the city of Minamibōsō.

== Economy ==
The economy of Shirahama was largely based on farming and horticulture (primarily oranges).
