= EAC-C2C =

Submarine communications cable network in East and Southeast Asia

EAC-C2C is a submarine telecommunications cable system interconnecting several countries in Asia, the Pacific, and the United States. It is a merger of the former EAC (East Asia Crossing) and C2C cable systems. The merger occurred in 2007 by Asia Netcom, and the cable system is now owned/operated by Pacnet. Pacnet was acquired by the Australian telecommunications company Telstra in 2015.

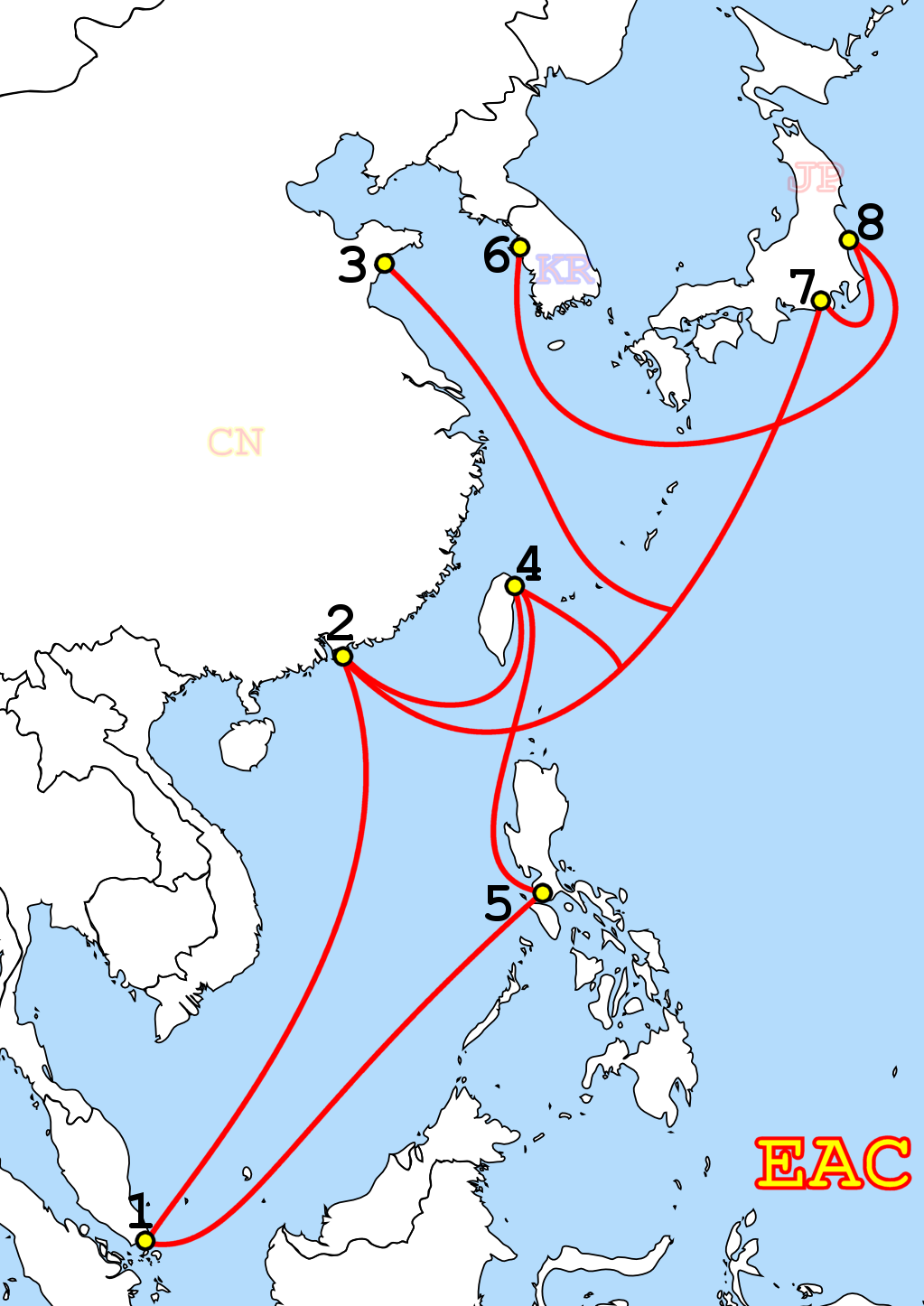

The EAC portion of the cable system includes:

Landing points:

1. Changi, Singapore
2. Tseung Kwan O, Hong Kong
3. Qingdao, China (later extension)
4. Bali, Taiwan
5. Capepisa, The Philippines
6. Taean, South Korea
7. Shima, Japan
8. Ajigaura, Hitachinaka, Ibaraki, Japan

Length: 19,500 kilometers

Capacity: 160 Gbit/s - upgradeable to 2.5 Tbit/s

Technology: DWDM (dense wavelength-division multiplex)

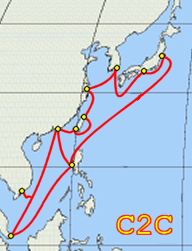
Entire C2C Network

The C2C portion of the cable system comprises three rings:

- C2C North Ring
- C2C South Ring

The landing points on each ring are as follows:

== C2C North Ring ==
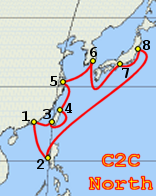

1. Chung Hom Kok, Southern District, Hong Kong
2. Nasugbu, Batangas Province, Philippines
3. Fangshan, Pingtung County, Taiwan
4. Danshui District, New Taipei City, Taiwan
5. Nanhui District, Shanghai, China
6. Pusan, South Korea
7. Shima, Mie Prefecture, Japan
8. Chikura, Chiba, Chiba Prefecture, Japan

== C2C South Ring ==
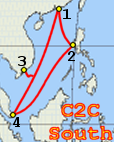

1. Hong Kong
2. Nasugbu, Batangas Province, Philippines
3. Vung Tau, Bà Rịa–Vũng Tàu province, Vietnam
4. Changi, Singapore

== EAC-C2C Merger ==
In 2007, Asia Netcom (now Pacnet) merged the EAC cable system and the C2C cable system into a single EAC-C2C cable system, spanning 36,800 kilometers between Japan, Korea, China, Taiwan, Hong Kong, the Philippines and Singapore, connecting 17 cable landing stations. EAC-C2C cable system becomes the most resilient submarine network in Asia region.
