= Wada, Chiba =

Wada 和田町
- Former municipality
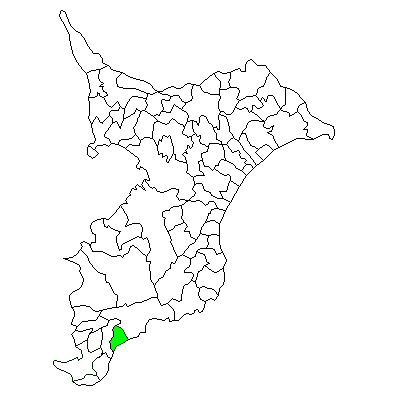
- Location of Wada in Chiba Prefecture

- Location in Japan
- Coordinates: 35.033°N 140.017°E
- Country: Japan
- Region: Kantō
- Prefecture: Chiba Prefecture
- District: Awa
- Merged: March 20, 2006 (now part of Minamibōsō)

Area
  - Total: 32.45 km^{2} (12.53 sq mi)

Population (March 20, 2006)
  - Total: 7,717
  - Density: 176/km^{2} (460/sq mi)
- Time zone: UTC+09:00 (JST)
- Symbols
- Flower: Brassica napus
- Tree: Camellia

Wada (和田町, Wada-chō) was a town located in Awa District, Chiba Prefecture, Japan.

As of March 20, 2006, the town had an estimated population of 5,717 and a density of 176 persons per km^{2}. The total area was 32.45 km^{2}.

== Geography ==
Wada was located at the southeast end of Chiba Prefecture, facing the Pacific Ocean. The town had a temperate maritime climate with hot, humid summers and mild, cool winters.

== History ==
Wada Village was created on April 1, 1889 within Asai District, which became part of Awa District from April 1, 1897. Wada became a town on March 13, 1899. On March 31, 1955, Wada absorbed the neighboring village of Kitamihara, and on September 1, 1956 expanded further through annexation of most of the neighboring village of Minamihara.

On March 20, 2006, Wada, along with the towns of Chikura, Maruyama, Shirahama, Tomiura and Tomiyama, and the village of Miyoshi (all from Awa District), was merged to create the city of Minamibōsō.

== Economy ==
The economy of Wada was largely based on commercial fishing, horticulture (primarily loquats, and summer tourism.

== Transportation ==
=== Highway ===
- Japan National Route 128

=== Railway ===
- JR East – Uchibō Line
  - Minamihara - Wadaura
