= Chikura, Chiba =

Chikura 千倉町
- Former municipality
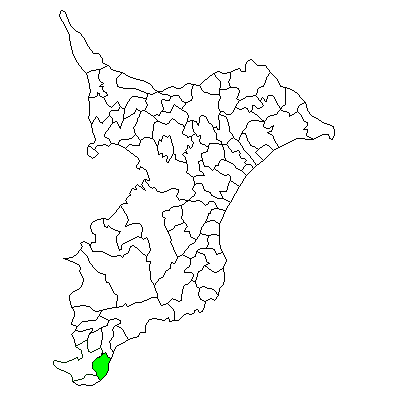
- Location of Chikura in Chiba Prefecture

- Location in Japan
- Coordinates: 34°57′N 139°57′E
- Country: Japan
- Region: Kantō
- Prefecture: Chiba Prefecture
- District: Awa
- Merged: March 20, 2006 (now part of Minamibōsō)

Area
  - Total: 34.64 km^{2} (13.37 sq mi)

Population (October 1, 2004)
  - Total: 12,527
  - Density: 342/km^{2} (890/sq mi)
- Time zone: UTC+09:00 (JST)
- Symbols
- Flower: Prunus mume

Chikura (千倉町, Chikura-machi) was a town located in Awa District, Chiba Prefecture, Japan.

As of October 1, 2004, the town had an estimated population of 12,527 and a density of 342 persons per km^{2}. The total area was 36.64 km^{2}.

== Geography ==
Chikura was located at southern end of Chiba Prefecture, at the southeast extremity of Bōsō Peninsula, facing the Pacific Ocean. The town had a temperate maritime climate with hot, humid summers and mild, cool winters.

Chikura is the cable landing point for several submarine communications cables. The Chikura cable station is next to Setohama beach and lands:

- APCN 2
- C2C
- CUCN
- FASTER
- Unity

== History ==
Asai Village was created on April 1, 1889 within Asai District, which became part of Awa District from April 1, 1897. It became a town on June 25, 1900, and was renamed Chikura on October 1, 1920. The town expanded through merger with Nanaura, Takeda, and Chitose villages in 1954.

On March 20, 2006, Chikura, along with the towns of Maruyama, Shirahama, Tomiura, Tomiyama and Wada, and the village of Miyoshi (all from Awa District), was merged to create the city of Minamibōsō.

== Economy ==
The economy of Chikura was largely based on commercial fishing, horticulture (primarily herbs and flowers), and summer tourism.

== Transportation ==
=== Highway ===
- Japan National Route 128
- Japan National Route 410

== Railway ==
- JR East – Uchibō Line
  - Chikura - Chitose

== Local events ==
The area has an annual summer festival, Chikura Matsuri. The only Shinto shrine in town is Takabe-jinja Shrine, which is devoted to the God of Cooking. Twice a year, a special ceremony is held where a fish is cleaned and prepared without being touched by the priests' hands.

The Minamibōsō Two Day Flower Walk is held every first weekend of March. In this framework, there is a close relationship and exchange program with the city of Blankenberge, Belgium, and the link Two Day March of Flanders. In the summer the area is a very popular place as beach resort and surfing.
