= Iwai Station =

Railway station in Minamibōsō, Chiba Prefecture, Japan

Iwai Station 岩井駅
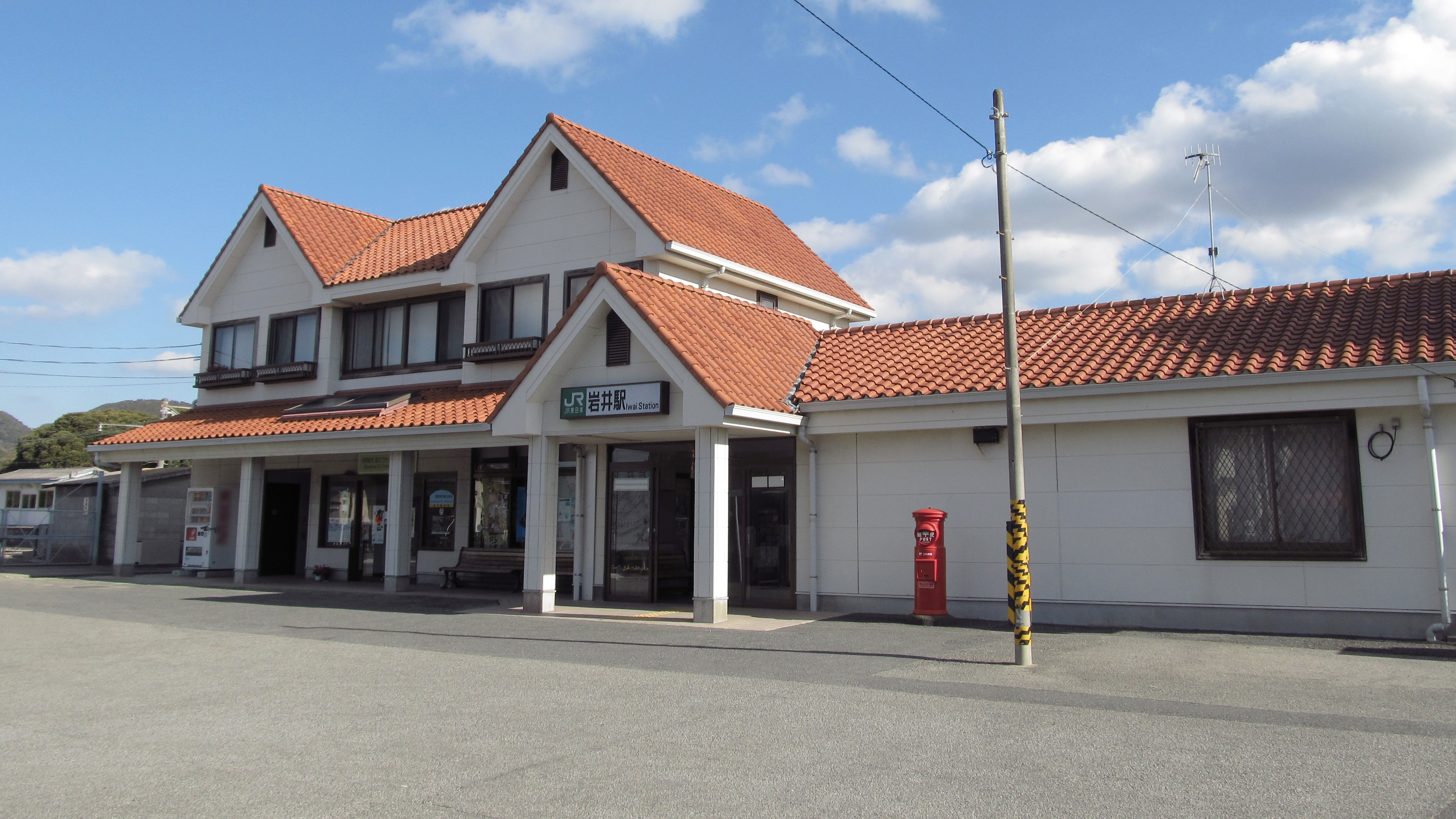
- Iwai Station in December 2013

General information
- Location: Ichibu 146-2, Minamibōsō-shi, Chiba-ken 299-2226; Japan
- Coordinates: 35.0926°N 139.8497°E
- Operator: JR East
- Line: ■ Uchibō Line
- Distance: 73.7 km from Soga
- Platforms: 1 island platform

Other information
- Status: Staffed
- Website: Official website

History
- Opened: August 10, 1918

Passengers
- FY2019: 244

Services
Preceding station	JR East	Following station
Awa-Katsuyama towards Soga or Chiba	Uchibō Line Local	Tomiura towards Awa-Kamogawa
Location
- Location within Chiba Prefecture Location within Japan

Iwai Station (岩井駅, Iwai-eki) is a passenger railway station in the city of Minamibōsō, Chiba Prefecture, Japan, operated by the East Japan Railway Company (JR East).

== Lines ==
Iwai Station is served by the Uchibō Line, and is located 73.7 km from the western terminus of the line at Soga Station.

== Station layout ==
The station is an at-grade station with a single island platform connected to the station building by a footbridge. The station is staffed.

=== Platforms ===
1	■ Uchibō Line	for Kimitsu, Kisarazu, Chiba
2	■ Uchibō Line	for Tateyama, Awa-Kamogawa

== History ==
Iwai Station was opened on August 10, 1918. The station was absorbed into the JR East network upon the privatization of the Japan National Railways (JNR) on April 1, 1987.

== Passenger statistics ==
In fiscal 2019, the station was used by an average of 244 passengers daily (boarding passengers only).

== Surrounding area ==
- National Route 127
- Former Tomiyama Town Hall

== See also ==
- List of railway stations in Japan
