= Maruyama, Chiba =

Maruyama 丸山町
- Former municipality
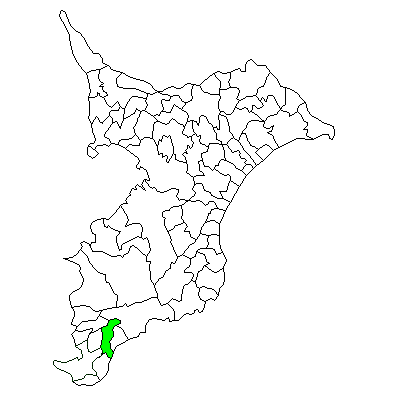
- Location of Maruyama in Chiba Prefecture

- Location in Japan
- Coordinates: 35°01′59″N 139°58′22″E
- Country: Japan
- Region: Kantō
- Prefecture: Chiba Prefecture
- District: Awa
- Merged: March 20, 2006 (now part of Minamibōsō)

Area
  - Total: 44.11 km^{2} (17.03 sq mi)

Population (August 1, 2004)
  - Total: 5,780
  - Density: 131/km^{2} (340/sq mi)
- Time zone: UTC+09:00 (JST)
- Symbols
- Bird: Japanese white-eye
- Flower: Rosemary
- Tree: Hinoki

Maruyama (丸山町, Maruyama-chō) was a town located in Awa District, Chiba Prefecture, Japan.

As of August 1, 2004, the town had an estimated population of 5,780 and a density of 131 persons per km^{2}. The total area was 44.11 km^{2}.

== Geography ==
Maruyama was located at the southeast end of Chiba Prefecture, in an inland area of the southern Bōsō Peninsula, with a small shoreline facing the Pacific Ocean. The town had a temperate maritime climate with hot, humid summers and mild, cool winters.

== History ==
Maruyama Town was created on March 15, 1955 from the merger of former Maru Village, Toyota Village and a portion of Chikura Town. It expanded on September 1, 1956 through the annexation of a portion of former Minamihara Village.

On March 20, 2006, Maruyama, along with the towns of Chikura, Shirahama, Tomiura, Tomiyama and Wada, and the village of Miyoshi (all from Awa District), was merged to create the city of Minamibōsō.

== Economy ==
The economy of Maruyama was largely based on horticulture (primarily herbs and flowers), and summer tourism. Until 2020 it had a Shakespeare Country Park.

== Transportation ==
=== Highway ===
- Japan National Route 128
- Japan National Route 410
