= Amatsukominato, Chiba =

Amatsukominato 天津小湊町
- Former Town
- Flag Emblem

- Location in Japan
- Coordinates: 35°09′25″N 140°12′13″E
- Country: Japan
- Region: Kantō
- Prefecture: Chiba Prefecture
- District: Awa,
- Merged: February 11, 2005 (now part of Kamogawa)

Area
  - Total: 43.95 km^{2} (16.97 sq mi)

Population (April 1, 2005)
  - Total: 7,294
  - Density: 166/km^{2} (430/sq mi)
- Time zone: UTC+09:00 (JST)
- Symbols
- Tree: Cryptomeria

Amatsukominato (天津小湊町, Amatsukominato-chō) was a town located in Awa District, Chiba Prefecture, Japan.

== History ==
=== Establishment ===
Amatsukominato was formed on February 11, 1955, by the merger of the towns of Amatsu and Kominato.

=== Dissolvement ===
On February 11, 2005, Amatsukominato was merged into the expanded city of Kamogawa, and thus no longer exists as an independent municipality.

== Geography ==
In 2003 (the last data available before its merger into Kamogawa), the town had an estimated population of 7,294 and a density of 166 persons per km^{2}. Its total area was 43.95 km^{2}.

The town's economy was largely based on commercial fishing.
