= Awa Province (Chiba) =

Former province of Japan

Awa Province 安房国
- Province of Japan
- 8th century–1871
- Map of Japanese provinces (1868) with Awa Province (Chiba) highlighted
- Capital: Minamibōsō
- History
  - Established: 8th century
  - Disestablished: 1871
| Preceded by | Succeeded by |
| Kazusa Province | Chiba Prefecture |
- Today part of: Chiba Prefecture

Awa Province (安房国, Awa no Kuni; Japanese pronunciation: [ä́.β̞ä̀ (nò̞ kɯ̈̀.ɲ̟ì)]) was a province of Japan in the area of modern Chiba Prefecture. It lies on the tip of the Bōsō Peninsula (房総半島), whose name takes its first kanji from the name of Awa Province and its second from Kazusa and Shimōsa Provinces. Its abbreviated form name was Bōshū (房州) or Anshū (安州). Awa Province in Shikoku phonetically has the same name, but is written with different kanji (阿波国). Awa is classified as one of the provinces of the Tōkaidō. Under the Engishiki classification system, Awa was ranked as a "middle country" (中国) and a "far country" (遠国).

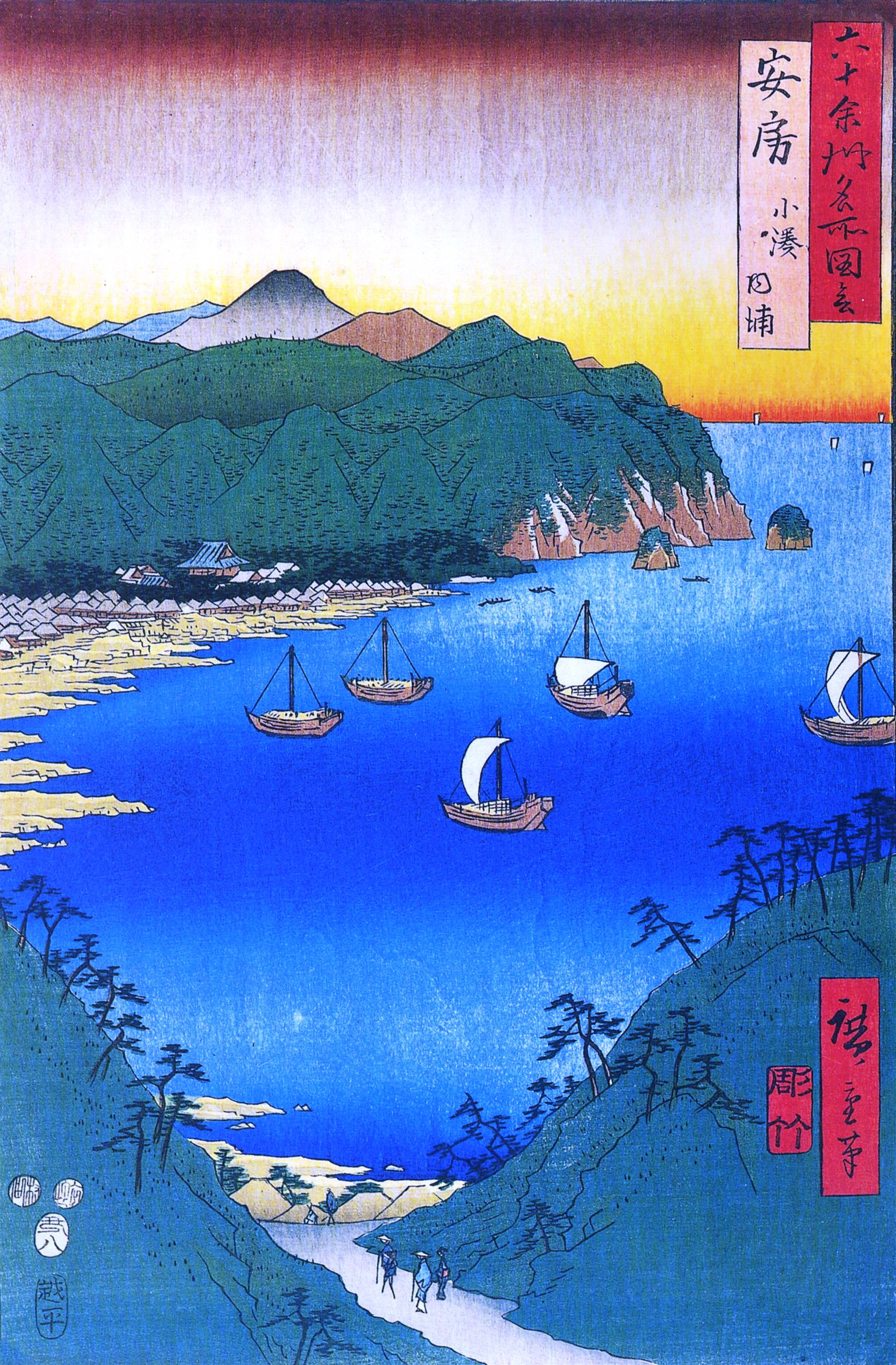
Hiroshige ukiyo-e, showing a harbor of Awa Province, specifically the then village of Kominato

== History ==
Awa was originally one of four districts of Kazusa Province. It was well-known to the Imperial Court in Nara period Japan for its bountiful seafoods, and is mentioned in Nara period records as having supplied fish to the Court as early as the reign of the semi-legendary Emperor Keikō. On May 2, 718 the district of Awa was elevated into status to a full province. On December 10, 741 it was merged back into Kazusa, but regained its independent status in 757. The exact location of the capital of the new province is not known, but is believed to have been somewhere within the borders of the modern city of Minamibōsō, Chiba; however, the Kokubun-ji was located in what is now the city of Tateyama, Chiba as is the Ichinomiya (Awa Shrine) of the province.

During the Heian period, the province was divided into numerous shōen controlled by local samurai clans. These clans sided with Minamoto no Yoritomo in the Genpei War. The history of the province in the Kamakura period is uncertain, but it came under the control of the Yūki clan and the Uesugi clan in the early Muromachi period. However, by the Sengoku period, the Satomi clan had gained control over much of Awa, Kazusa and Shimōsa provinces. The Satomi sided with Tokugawa Ieyasu in the Battle of Sekigahara, but after being implicated in the political intrigues of Ōkubo Tadachika in 1614, were forced to surrender their domains for Kurayoshi Domain in Hōki Province, Awa became tenryō territory administered by various hatamoto aside from five small domains created at various times in the Edo period (three of which survived to the Meiji Restoration), with an additional two domains created at the start of the Meiji period. The entire province had an assessed revenue of 95,736 koku.

The various domains and tenryo territories were transformed into short-lived prefectures in July 1871 by the abolition of the han system, and the entire territory of Awa Province became part of the new Chiba Prefecture on June 15, 1873.

== Historical districts ==
- Asai District (朝夷郡) – merged into Awa District (along with Hei and Nagasa Districts) on April 1, 1897
- Awa District (安房郡) – absorbed Asai, Hei and Nagasa Districts on April 1, 1897
- Heguri District (平群郡) – merged into Awa District (along with Asai and Nagasa Districts) on April 1, 1897
- Nagasa District (長狭郡) – merged into Awa District (along with Asai and Hei Districts) on April 1, 1897

== Domains in Awa Province ==
Domains in Awa Province
| Domain | Daimyō | Dates | Revenue (koku) | Type |
|---|---|---|---|---|
| Nagao Domain (長尾藩) | Honda | 1868–1871 | 40,000 | fudai |
| Tōjō Domain (東条藩) | Saigo | 1620–1693 | 10,000 | fudai |
| Hanabusa Domain (花房藩) | Nishio | 1871–1871 | 35,000 | fudai |
| Tateyama Domain (館山藩) | Inaba | 1781–1871 | 10,000 | fudai |
| Hōjō Domain (北条藩) | Mizuno | 1638–1827 | 15,000 | fudai |
| Funagata Domain (船形藩) | Hiraoka | 1864–1868 | 10,000 | fudai |
| Awa-Katsuyama Domain (安房勝山藩) | Sakai | 1590–1871 | 12,000 | fudai |
| Awa-Saigusa Domain (安房三枝藩) | Saigusa | 1638–1639 | 15,000 | fudai |
