= Minamibōsō =

Minamibōsō 南房総市
- City
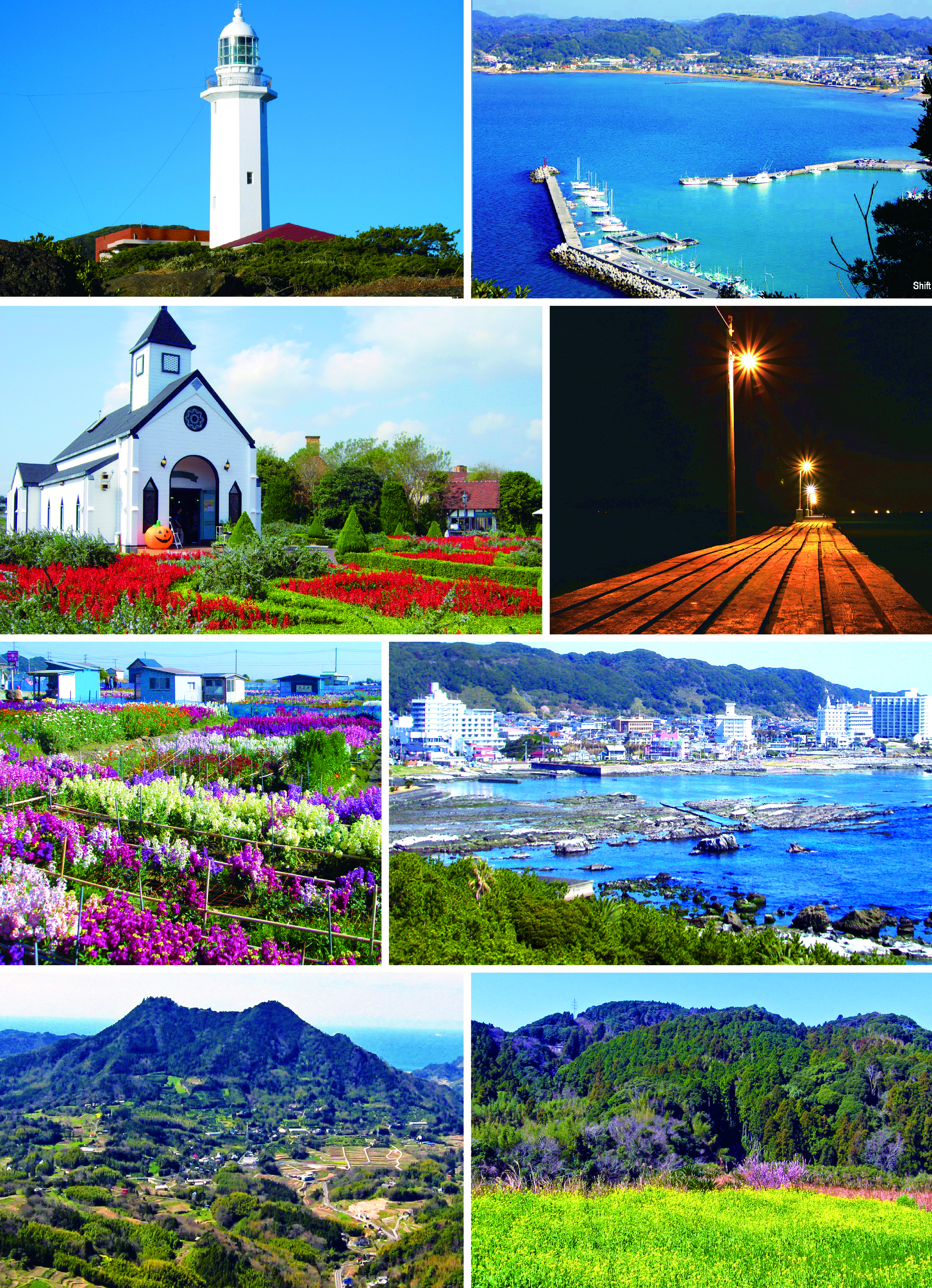
- Clockwise from top: Nojimazaki Lighthouse, Toyoura fishing port, Rosemary Park, Haraoka Beach, Shiramazu Flower Park, Shirahama onse, Mount Tomi, Wadaura flow fields

- Flag Seal

- Location of Minamibōsō in Chiba Prefecture

- Coordinates: 35°02′35.4″N 139°50′24″E
- Country: Japan
- Region: Kantō
- Prefecture: Chiba
- Established: March 20, 2006

Government
  - Mayor: Yutaka Ishii

Area
  - Total: 230.14 km^{2} (88.86 sq mi)

Population (November 2020)
  - Total: 37,143
  - Density: 161.39/km^{2} (418.01/sq mi)
- Time zone: UTC+9 (Japan Standard Time)
- Address: 28 Aoki Tomiura-chō, Minamibōsō-shi, Chiba-ken 299-2492
- Website: Official website

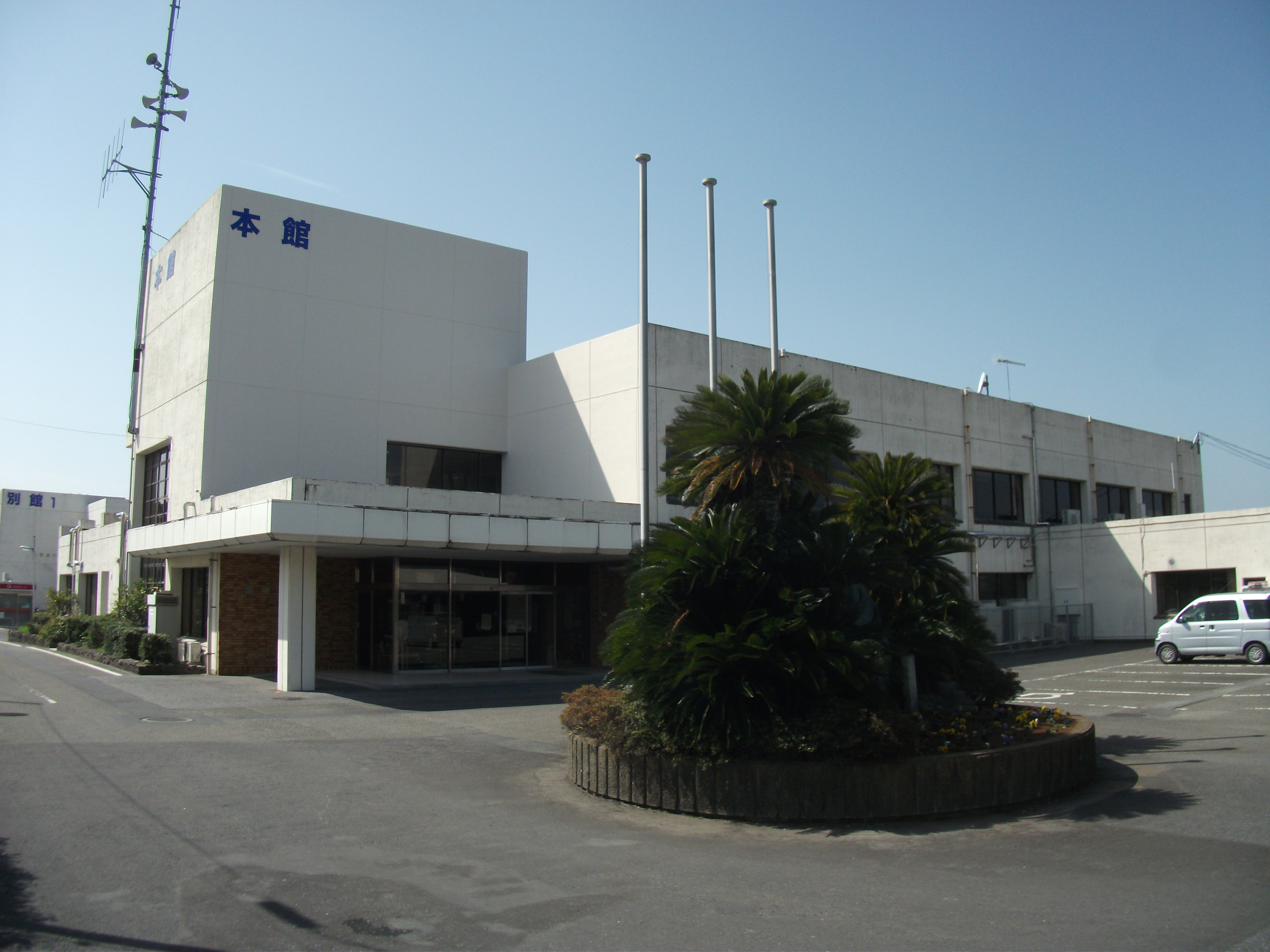
Minamibōsō City Hall

Minamibōsō (南房総市, Minamibōsō-shi) is a city located in Chiba Prefecture, Japan. As of 1 November 2020, the city had an estimated population of 37,143 in 17,175 households and a population density of 160 persons per km^{2}. The total area of the city is 230.22 square kilometres (88.89 sq mi), making it the fifth largest city in Chiba Prefecture in terms of area.

Minamibōsō is an area of historical relics and shrines. The city's slogan is 「ひと・ゆめ・みらい 地域で創る魅力の郷 南房総」, which translates to "People, Dreams, Future. A Village With Locally Grown Appeal, Minamibōsō." Minamibōsō is known for flowers, uchiwa fans (房州うちわ), loquat fruit, whaling (捕鯨), and surfing. It is currently tied in first place for the city with the most roadside stations selling locally produced goods in Japan.

== Geography ==
Minamibōsō is in the southern portion of Chiba Prefecture, near the southern tip of the Bōsō Peninsula. It is surrounded by water on three sides facing the Pacific Ocean to the east and south, and the entrance to Tokyo Bay on the west. Minamibōsō city has several mountain ranges over 300 meters high such as Mount Atago and Mount Tomi. Minamibōsō City surrounds Tateyama on the north, east, and south. The land in Minamibōsō is broken up as follows: 30.43% mountains/forest land, 13.23% rice paddies, 8.81% crop land, 6.25% open fields, 4.61% residential land.

=== Neighboring municipalities ===
Chiba Prefecture

- Kamogawa
- Kyonan
- Tateyama

=== Climate ===
The Minamibōsō area has a warm, maritime climate with hot summers and mild winters due to the Kuroshio Current. The average temperature is 16.22 degrees Celsius, with the average high and low temperatures at 34.34 degrees Celsius and -4.16 degrees Celsius respectively. The hottest months are from June to September, and the coldest months are from January to March. Minamibōsō City receives an average of 1767.15 mm of rainfall annually.

== Demographics ==
Per Japanese census data, the population of Minamibōsō has been decreasing over the past 70 years. Minamibōsō's cityscape is characterized by low-rise residential buildings dispersed throughout the various flat areas in town; the Chikura area, in east, is the town's most populous locality. As of 2007, 10.3% of the population was 0–14 years old, 56.1% of the population was between 15–64 years old, and 33.6% of the population was 65 and older.

Historical population
Year	Pop.	±%
1920	61,684	—
1930	61,106	−0.9%
1940	58,523	−4.2%
1950	74,213	+26.8%
1960	66,484	−10.4%
1970	58,801	−11.6%
1980	55,652	−5.4%
1990	51,228	−7.9%
2000	47,154	−8.0%
2010	42,104	−10.7%
2020	35,831	−14.9%

== History ==
The area of present-day Minamibōsō was part of ancient Awa Province, dominated by the Satomi clan during the Sengoku period, and mostly tenryō territory controlled directly by the Tokugawa shogunate, with portions under the control of various minor feudal domains. The area was divided into numerous towns and villages in the Meiji period, all within Awa District of Chiba Prefecture.

The modern city of Minamibōsō was formed from the merger on March 20, 2006 of the towns of Chikura, Maruyama, Shirahama, Tomiura, Tomiyama and Wada, and the village of Miyoshi (all from Awa District).

== Government ==
Minamibōsō has a mayor-council form of government with a directly elected mayor and a unicameral city council of 18 members. Minamibōsō contributes one member to the Chiba Prefectural Assembly. In terms of national politics, the city is part of Chiba 12th district of the lower house of the Diet of Japan.

== Economy ==
Minamibōsō serves as a commercial center for the surrounding region of southern Chiba Prefecture. The primary industry is commercial fishing and agriculture (horticulture and flowers). The tourist industry is a growing component of the local economy, with attractions being the areas beaches and hot spring resorts. In 2008, about 4.5 million tourists visited Minamibōsō City. Due to its close proximity to Tokyo and Chiba City, many people visit Minamibōsō on day trips. Of those 4.5 million tourists in 2008, almost 3.9 million of them were visiting on a day trip. Of the working population, about 60% own various private businesses such as small shops restaurants or medical practices, 25% work in Farming Fishing and Forestry, and 17% work in Manufacturing and Construction.

== Education ==
Minamibōsō has eight public elementary schools and six public junior high schools operated by the Minamiboso City Board of Education, and one public high school operated by the Chiba Prefectural Board of Education.

The prefectural high school is Awa Takushin High School (JA).

There is a municipal combined elementary and junior high school, Tomiyama Elementary and Junior High School a.k.a. Tomiyama Gakuen School (南房総市立富山学園).

Municipal junior high schools:

- Minamiboso Junior High School (南房総中学校) (opened on April 1, 2024 a.k.a. Reiwa 6)
- Miyoshi Junior High School (三芳中学校)
- Reinan Junior High School (嶺南中学校)
- Tomiura Junior High School (富浦中学校)

Municipal elementary schools:

- Chikura Elementary School (千倉小学校)
- Miyoshi Elementary School (三芳小学校)
- Reinan Elementary School (嶺南小学校)
- Shirahama Elementary School (白浜小学校)
- Tomiura Elementary School (富浦小学校)

Former schools:

- Chikura Junior High School (千倉中学校) (closed on March 31, 2024)
- Shirahama Junior High School (白浜中学校) (closed on March 31, 2024)

== Transportation ==
=== Railway ===
JR East – Uchibō Line

- Iwai – Tomiura – (Nakofunakata) – (Tateyama) – (Kokonoe) – Chikura – Chitose – Minamihara – Wadaura

The stations in parentheses are located in the neighboring Tateyama city.

=== Highway ===
- National Route 127
- National Route 128
- National Route 410

=== Bus ===
There are city buses that travel through three areas:

- Uchibo area (Tokyo Bay side of the Boso Peninsula)
- Shirahama/Chikura
- Maruyama/Wada

== Access ==
=== Car ===
From Tokyo:

Minamibōsō City is located within 100 km of Tokyo, and can be reached in 95 minutes by car through use of the Tokyo Bay Aqua-Line.

From Chiba:

It takes about 70 minutes from Chiba City to Minamibōsō by the Tateyama Expressway.

From Haneda Airport:

Minamibōsō City is about 80 minutes by car or highway bus from Haneda Airport

=== Highway bus ===
Highway Buses run by Keisei(京成), Nitto Transportation (日東交通), and Tateyama Nitto Bus (館山日東バス) companies are available to and from Chiba Station.

JR Buses (ジェイアールバス関東) are available to and from Tokyo Station.

From Chiba Station:

- Chiba Station - Highway Oasis Furari
- Chiba Station – Tomiura Biwa Club – Nagotaketo Building – Tateyama Station – Nanso Cultural Hall – Kokonoe Station
- Chiba Station – Chikura Station – Asai Commercial and Industrial Association – Shiokaze Oukoku (道の駅ちくら・潮風王国) – Shirahama Post Office – Shirahama Nojimazaki Station

From Tokyo Station: There are bus stops at:

- Tomiura Biwa Club in Tomiura
- Highway Oasis Furari in Tomiyama
- Chikura Station
- Asai Commercial and Industrial Center and Shiokaze Oukoku in Chikura
- Shirahama Post Office
- Awa Shirahama (安房白浜駅)

=== Ferry ===
The Tokyo-Wan Ferry is available to cross the Tokyo Bay from the Port of Kanaya in Futtsu, Chiba to the Port of Yokosuka.

== Sightseeing ==
=== Museums ===
- Shirahama Kaiyo Museum has exhibitions of maiwai fishing jackets and maritime artifacts.
- The Chikura Kaigan Museum has photography and glassware exhibitions by Shinpei Asai.

=== Shrines and temples ===
- Ishido-ji Temple: originated 1300 years ago, and houses the Eleven Faced Goddess of Mercy Statue.
- Jorakuzan Mantoku-ji Temple: famous for its "Reclining Buddha" statue.
- Joju-in Temple: the family temple of the Satomi clan, the basis for the book, Nansō Satomi Hakkenden.
- Komatsu-ji Temple: a famous place to visit to see the leaves change color in autumn. There are legends surrounding it involving the Satomi clan.
- Takabe Shrine: the only temple in Japan that worships the god of cooking. The Knife Ceremony, which dates back to the Heian period is held here three times a year.

=== Other famous areas ===
- Cape Nojimazaki is famous for Nojimazaki Lighthouse, the second western-style lighthouse to be built in Japan.
- Cape Taibusa is located on Tokyo Bay, and is one of "Chiba's Top 100 Sceneries." It also has a nature park with hiking trails.
- The Cave of Princess Fuse: Princess Fuse lived here with her dog Yatsufusa in the novel Nansō Satomi Hakkenden.
- Megane Bridge is one of "Japan's Famous Bridges." It is lit up every year in December and January.
- Mount Atago is home to a JASDF radar station
- Mount Iyogatake
- Mount Karasuba is another of "Chiba's Top 100 Sceneries". You can see Mt. Fuji from its observation decks.
- Mount Takazuka
- Mount Tomi is another of "Chiba's Top 100 Sceneries" and Mt. Fuji can be seen from the observation deck. It is surrounded by Mount Tomi Prefectural Park.
- Takida Castle: ancient residence of the Isshiki clan, it is also the setting for the beginning of Nansō Satomi Hakkenden.
- Yatsufusa Park: located below Kasuga shrine, it has a statue of Yatsufusa.

== Festivals and ceremonies ==
- Chikura BON Festa (August)
- Iwai Beach Nouryou Fireworks Festival (August)
- Knife Ceremony (May, October, November)
- Omatoshinji (March)
- Sangyo Matsuri (August)
- Shirahama Ama Festival (July)

=== Famous foods ===
The area of Wadaura in Wada is famous for whaling, and is one of two areas in Japan where whaling is permitted. As of November 7, 2012, a roadside station opened up in Wadaura in order to promote whale and other local cuisine such as namero and sanga (なめろう), and Boshu Lobster, and there are 21 restaurants in Wada that serve whale. Tomiura is famous for loquat fruits and also has a roadside station promoting the sales of products containing loquat. The area of Iwai in Tomiura is famous for abalone. Being surrounded by water on three sides, the entirety of Minamibōsō is famous for the aforementioned seafood as well as sushi and sashimi. Another famous thing in the area being flowers, edible flower dishes are well known in Minamibōsō city.

=== Roadside stations ===
As of November 7, 2012, Minamibōsō City has eight roadside stations promoting local produce and goods. It is currently tied with Takayama, Gifu for having the most roadside stations in the country. The roadside stations include:

- Tomiura Biwa Club: Located in Tomiura, it promotes products containing loquat, and has a local art gallery.
- Ootsu no Sato Flower Club: Located in Tomiura, it promotes seasonal flowers.
- Tomiraku Sato Tomiyama: Located in Tomiyama, it promotes fresh mountain and ocean produce.
- Hina no Sato: Located in Miyoshi, it promotes fresh vegetables and fruits.
- Rosemary Park: Located in Maruyama, it features a garden and buildings styled after Shakespeare's country home, and promotes seasonal flowers and herbs.
- Shirahama Nojimazaki: The southernmost roadside station, it is located in Shirahama, and it is a tourist break spot that offers information about the various localities in Minamibōsō.
- Chikura Shiokaze Oukoku: Located in Chikura, it promotes local seafood sales, and contains a small art gallery.
- Wadaura Wa・O!: Located in Wadaura, it is the newest roadside station in Japan, having opened on November 7, 2012. It promotes whale and other local marine cuisine, and has the Mini Whale Museum inside.

=== Other attractions ===
- Boshu Uchiwa fans (房州うちわ) are a traditional style of uchiwa that came to Minamibōsō and Tateyama in the 1870s.
- Being a peninsula, fishing is very popular.
- Flowers are grown all over Minamibōsō, and there are flower parks where the flowers are in bloom year-round.
- There are many hiking paths available in the mountains around Minamibōsō.
- The Knife Ceremony held three times a year at Takabe Shrine is a historic event that has taken place since the Heian period.
- Minamibōsō has a golf course called Cosmo Classic Golf Club.
- Campers can pitch a tent on the beach at Nemoto Marine Campground.
- There are many hot spring resorts in Minamibōsō in addition to several public foot baths which are located at the Tomiura Genki Club, Shirahama Flower Park, and Miyoshi's Hina no Sato.
- The beaches in Chikura are famous for having good waves for surfing

== Sister cities ==
- Ferndale, Washington, United States
- Blankenberge, Belgium

== Notable people from Minamibōsō ==
- Ai Aoki, politician, former singer
- Sessue Hayakawa, actor
- Takayuki Kato, baseball player, Hokkaido Nippon-Ham Fighters
- Osamu Suzuki, screenwriter
- Chonosuke Takagi, judoka
- Kazumi Takayama, former Nogizaka46 idol singer
- Mikogami Tenzen, Edo period samurai, founder of Ono-ha Ittō-ryū
- Sora Tokui, voice actress

== Gallery ==
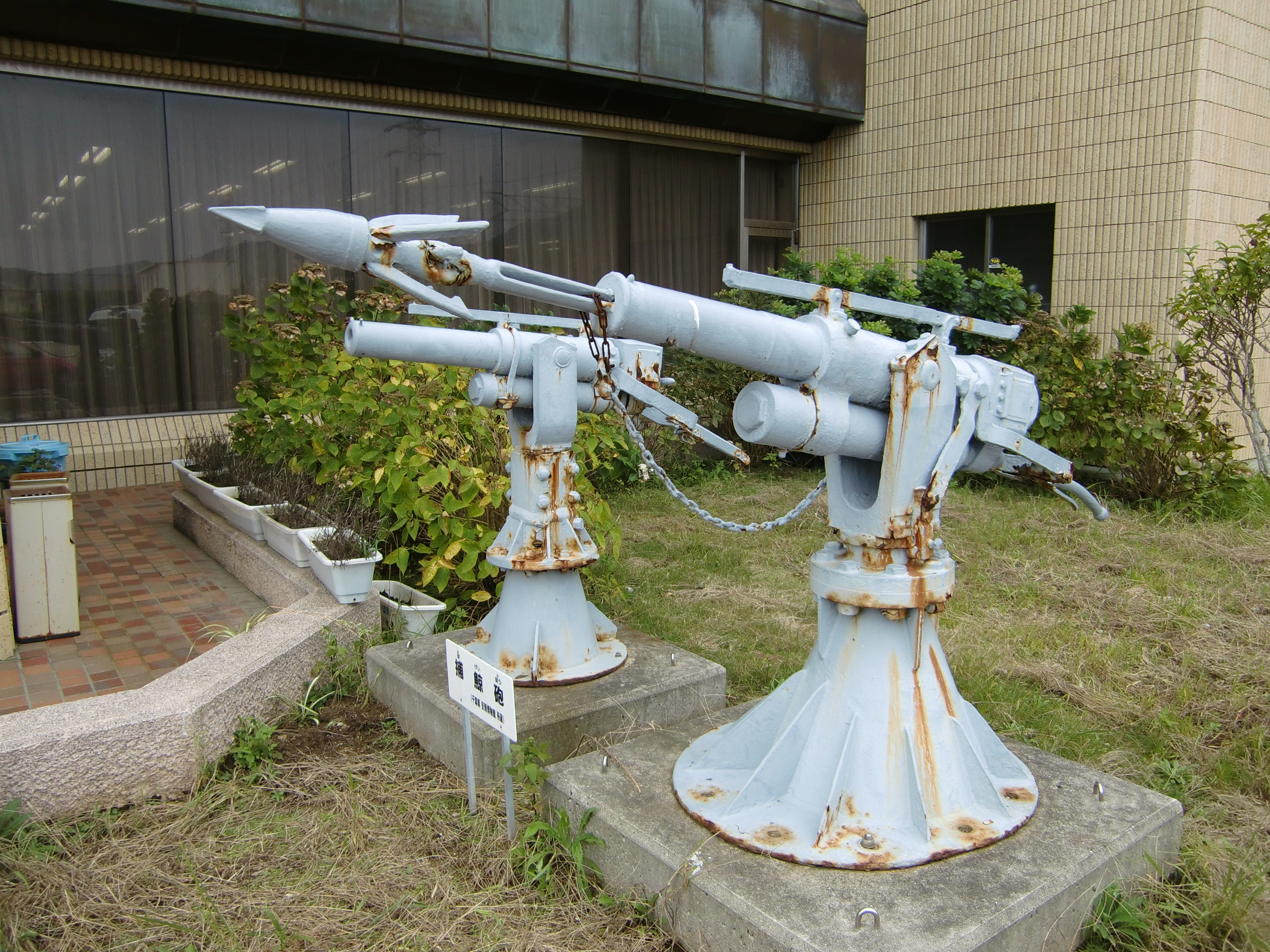
Whale rifle at Minamibōsō City Hall

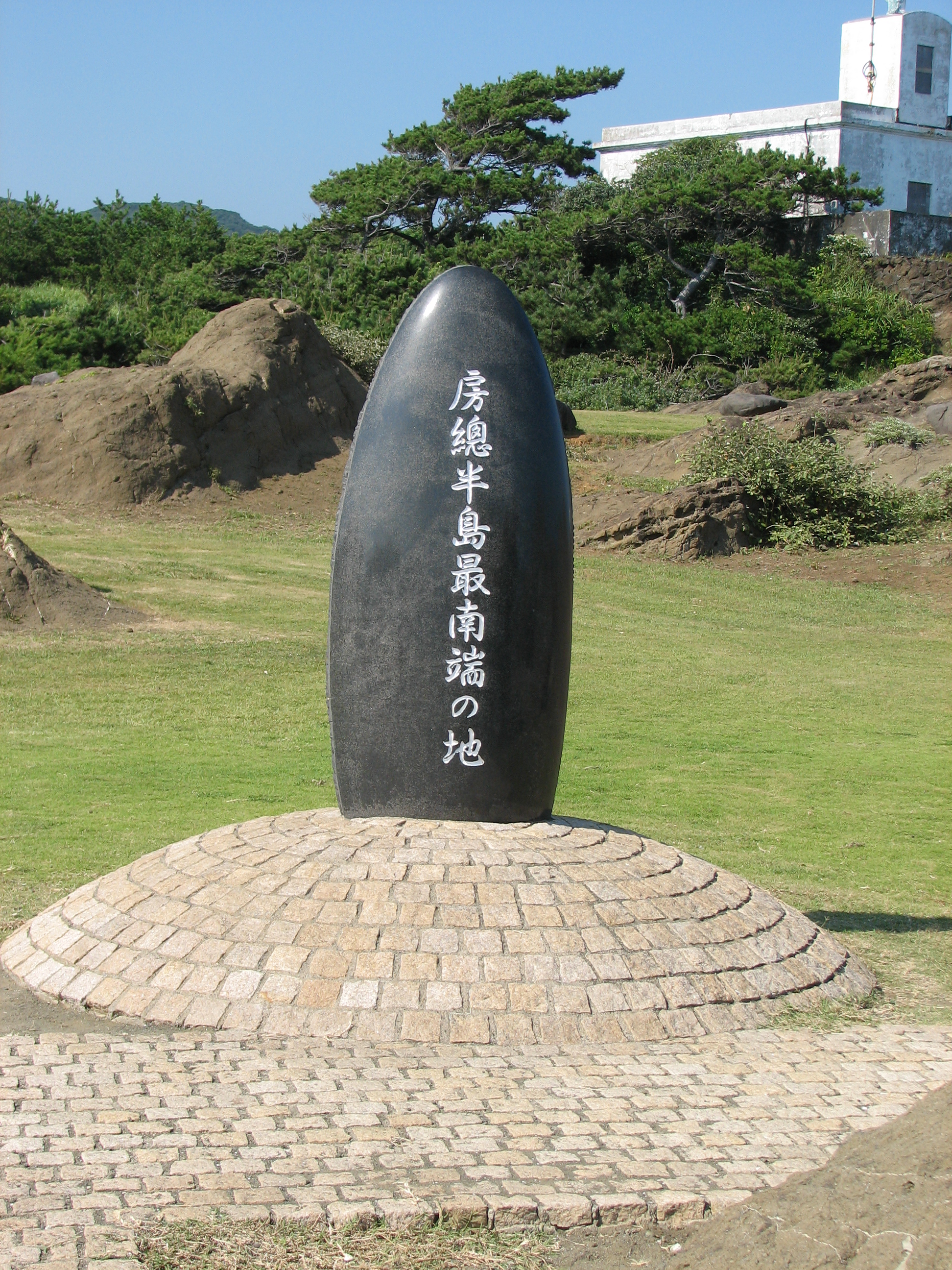
Southernmost point of Boso Peninsula

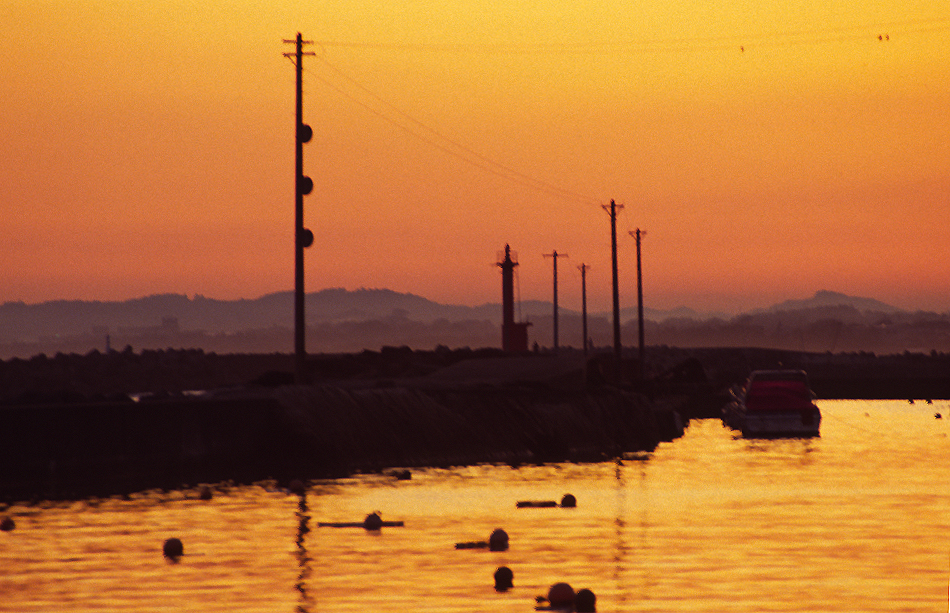
Wadaura Harbor

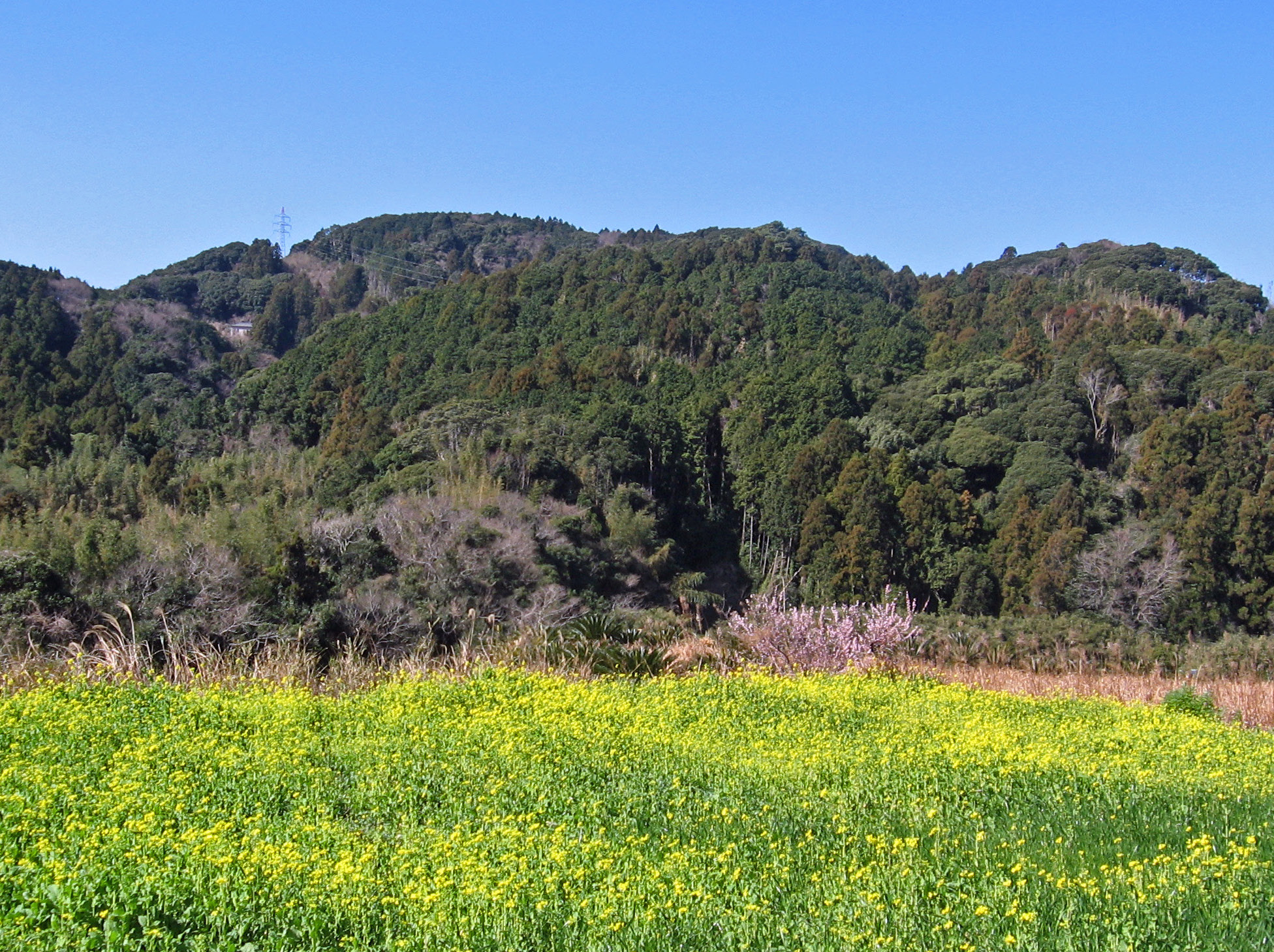
Mount Karasuba, Wadaura District

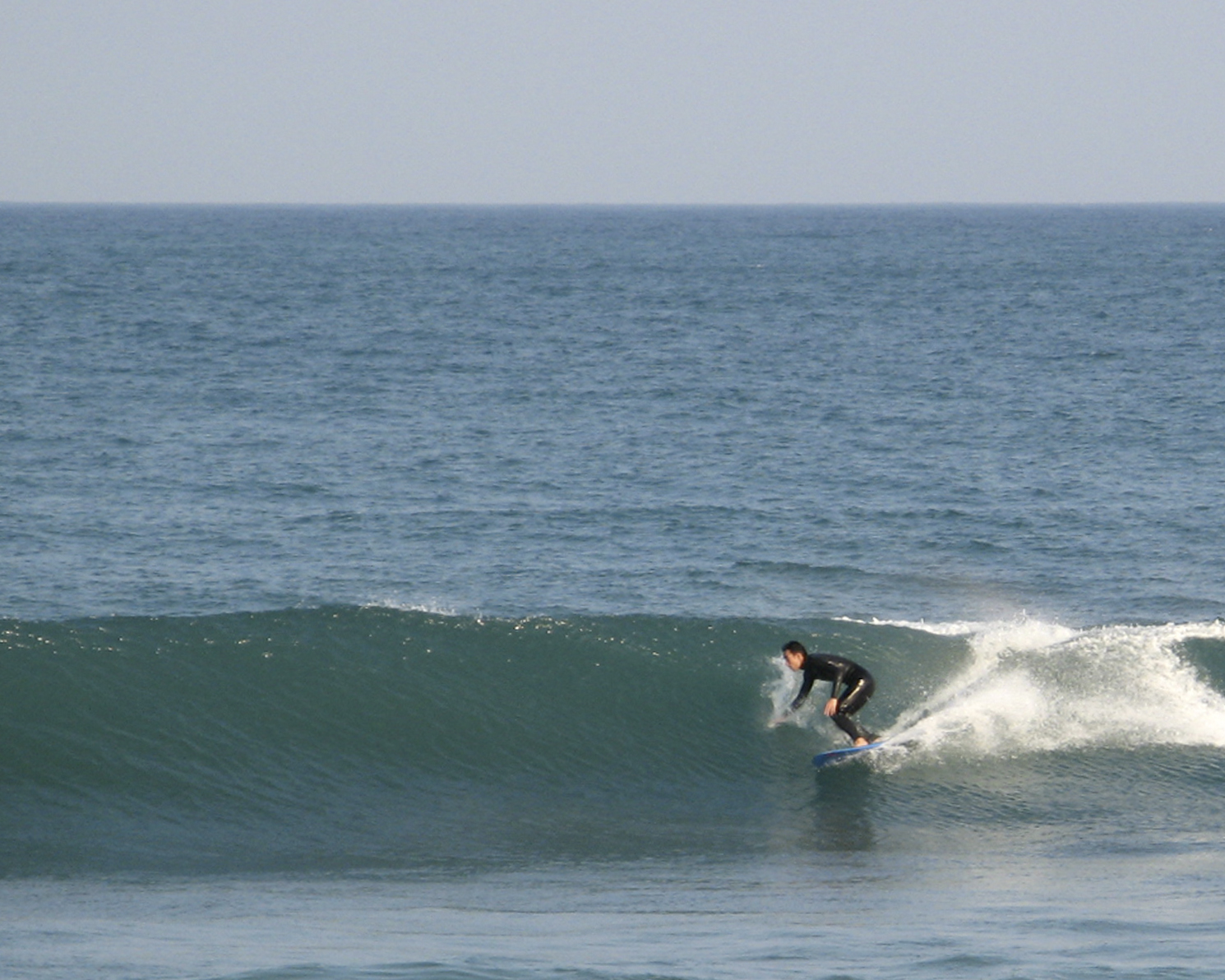
Surfer at Minamibōsō coast

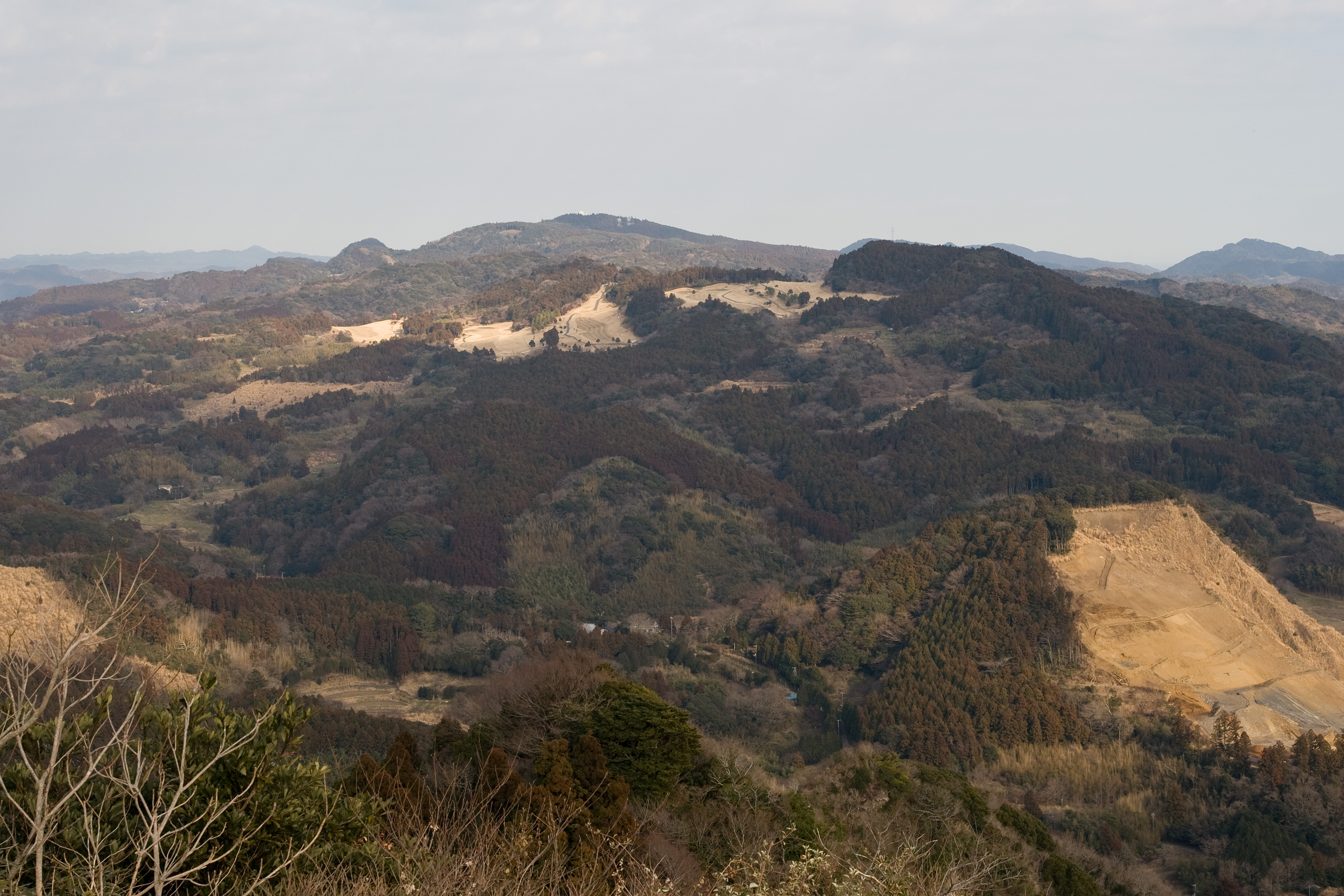
View of Mount Atago from Mount Iyogatake

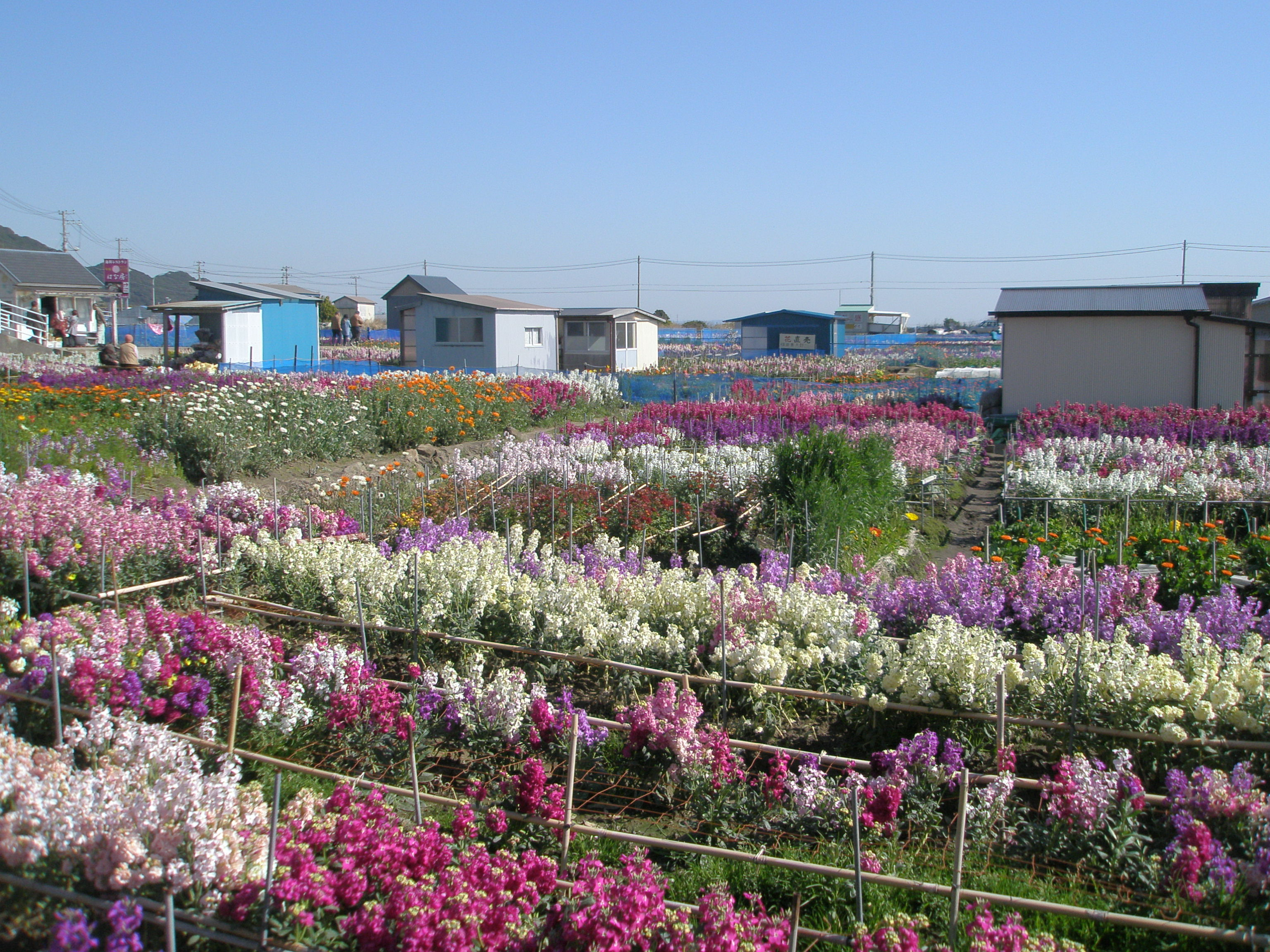
Flower farm at Shiramazu
