= Awa District, Chiba =

District in Chiba prefecture, Japan

Coordinates: 35°7′N 139°50′E

Location of Awa District in Chiba Prefecture

Awa District (安房郡, Awa-gun) is a district located in Chiba Prefecture, Japan. As of August 2010, the district had an estimated population of 8,992 and a density of 198 persons per km^{2}. Its total area was 45.16 square kilometres (17.44 mi^{2}). Awa District at present consists only of the town of Kyonan

== History ==
Awa District was one of the ancient districts of Kazusa Province, and originally covered all of the southern end of Bōsō Peninsula. In 718, it was separated from Kazusa to become the separate province of Awa, which existed to the Meiji Restoration of 1868.

In the cadastral reforms of the early Meiji period, Awa Province was divided into four modern districts in 1868: Awa District (安房郡), Asai District (朝夷郡), Nagasa District (長狭郡) and Hei District (平郡) (formerly called Heguri). At the time of its formation, Awa District consisted of 93 hamlets, divided evenly between Tateyama Domain and Nagao Domain. These were consolidated into two towns (Tateyama and Hōjō, which merged with Tateyama in 1993) and nine villages. In 1897, three districts of Asai, Hei and Nagasa were absorbed into Awa District, at which time Awa District expanded to seven towns and 37 villages. Subsequently, Awa District has been gradually reduced in size through the formation of cities, and at present consists only of the town of Kyonan.

=== Mergers ===
- On February 11, 2005, the town of Amatsukominato merged into the city Kamogawa.
- On March 20, 2006, the towns of Chikura, Maruyama, Shirahama, Tomiura, Tomiyama and Wada, and the village of Miyoshi merged to form the new city of Minamibōsō.

== Bibliography ==
- Awa-gun shi: History of Awa-county, Chiba prefecture. Chiba Prefectural Board of Education. 1926.
- Districts in Chiba Prefecture. General Books. 2010. ISBN 1-158-37112-8.
- Counties of Japan
