= Shirahama, Chiba =

Shirahama 白浜町
- Former municipality
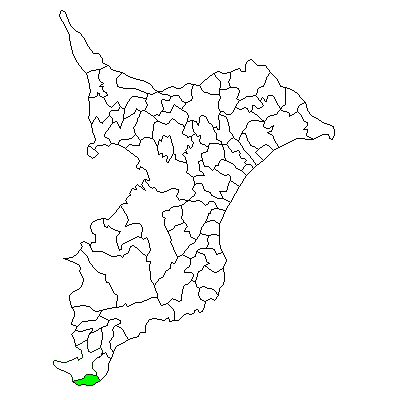
- Location of Shirahama in Chiba Prefecture

- Location in Japan
- Coordinates: 34.9082°N 139.8993°E
- Country: Japan
- Region: Kantō
- Prefecture: Chiba Prefecture
- District: Awa
- Merged: March 20, 2006 (now part of Minamibōsō)

Area
  - Total: 17.07 km^{2} (6.59 sq mi)

Population (October 1, 2004)
  - Total: 6,027
  - Density: 353/km^{2} (910/sq mi)
- Time zone: UTC+09:00 (JST)
- Symbols
- Flower: Crinum asiaticum
- Tree: Camellia

Shirahama (白浜町, Shirahama-chō) was a town located in Awa District, Chiba Prefecture, Japan.

== Population ==
As of October 1, 2004, the town had an estimated population of 6,027 and a density of 353 persons per km^{2}. The total area was 17.07 km^{2}.

== Geography ==
Shirahama was located at very southern end of Chiba Prefecture, at the southern extremity of Bōsō Peninsula, facing the Pacific Ocean. The town had a temperate maritime climate with hot, humid summers and mild, cool winters.

== History ==
Shirahama Village was created on April 1, 1889, within Asai District, which became part of Awa District from April 1, 1897. It became a town on April 1, 1933.

On March 20, 2006, Shirahama, along with the towns of Chikura, Maruyama, Tomiura, Tomiyama and Wada, and the village of Miyoshi (all from Awa District), was merged to create the city of Minamibōsō.

Prior to the merger, Shirahama was known as Shirahama-machi in Japanese. Subsequently, it has become known as Shirahama-cho. Both "machi" and "cho" are written the same way in Japanese, but the different pronunciations convey the information that Shirahama is now a neighborhood within Minamibōsō rather than its own municipality.

== Economy ==
The economy of Shirahama was largely based on commercial fishing, horticulture (primarily herbs and flowers), and summer tourism.

== Local attractions ==
- Nojimazaki Lighthouse
