= Japan National Route 128 =

National highway in Chiba Prefecture, Japan

National Route 128
- 国道128号
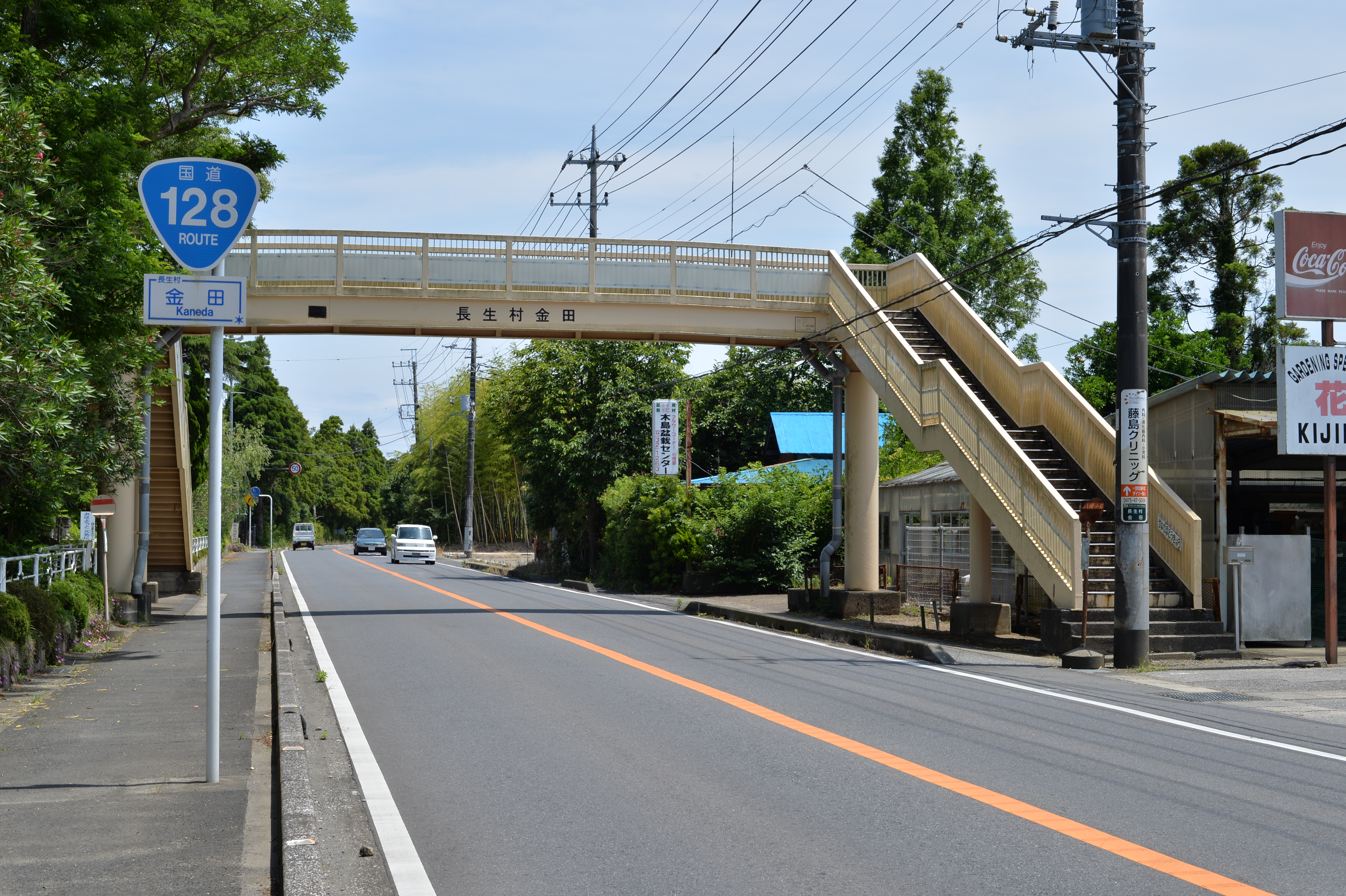

Route information
- Length: 131.6 km (81.8 mi)
- Existed: 1953–present

Major junctions
- South end: National Route 410 / Prefectural Road 302 in Tateyama, Chiba
- North end: National Route 51 / National Route 126 in Chūō-ku, Chiba

Location
- Country: Japan

Highway system
- National highways of Japan; Expressways of Japan
| ← National Route 127 | → National Route 129 |

National Route 128 is a national highway of Japan connecting Tateyama, Chiba, and Chūō-ku, Chiba, in Japan, with a total length of 131.6 km (81.77 mi). Its northernmost point is at geographic co-ordinates:35.550978,140.349827 and its southernmost at:34.993371,139.869347.
