= Japan National Route 127 =

Road in Japan

National Route 127
- 国道127号
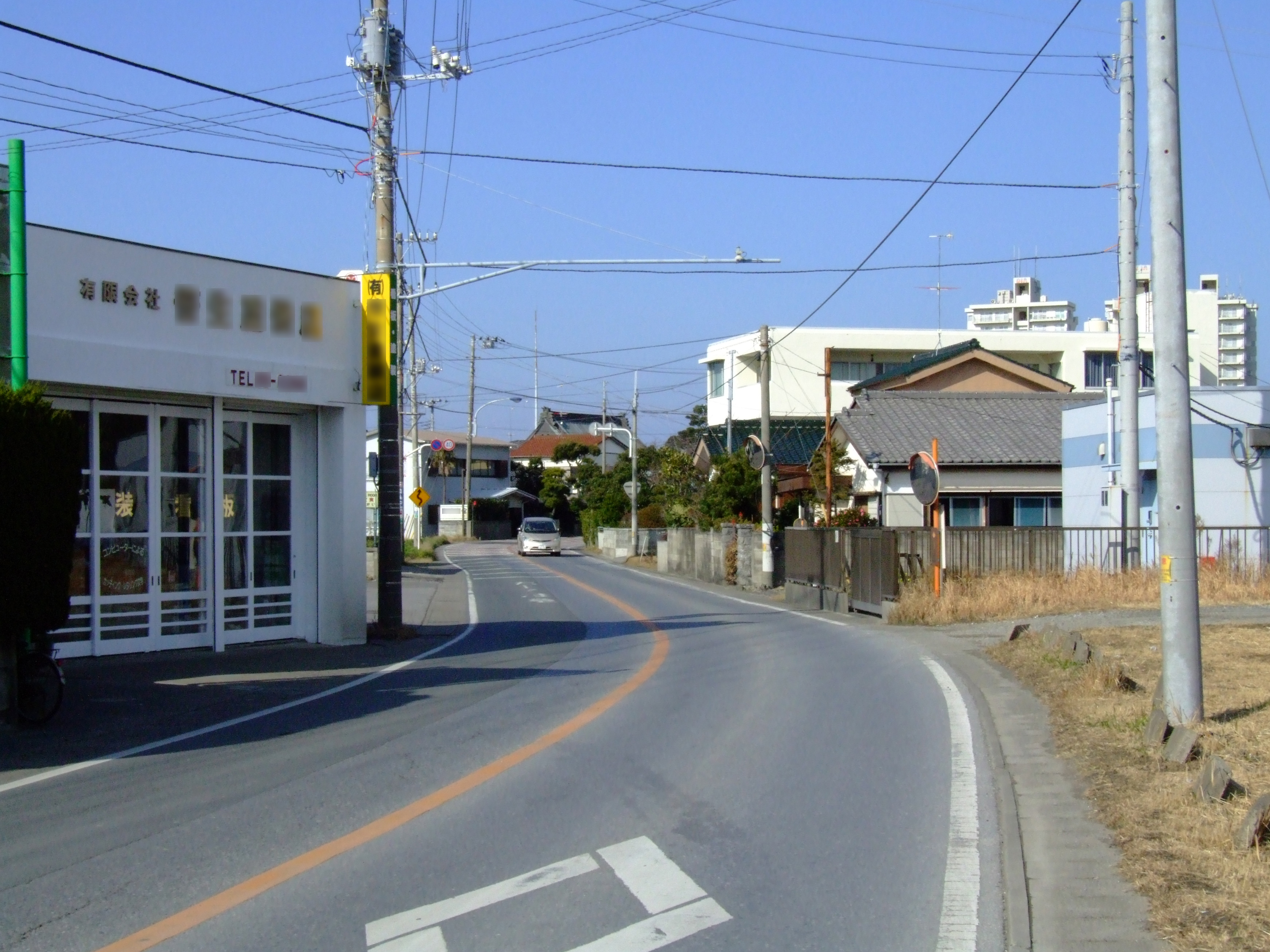

Route information
- Length: 54.5 km (33.9 mi)
- Existed: 1953–present

Major junctions
- North end: National Route 16 in Kisarazu, Chiba
- South end: National Route 128 / National Route 410 in Tateyama, Chiba

Location
- Country: Japan

Highway system
- National highways of Japan; Expressways of Japan
← National Route 126	→ National Route 128

National Route 127 is a national highway of Japan connecting Tateyama, Chiba, and Kisarazu, Chiba, in Japan, with a total length of 54.5 km (33.86 mi).

== History ==
When designated in 1953, Route 127 originally ran from Tateyama to Chiba. The section from Kisarazu to Chiba was redesignated as a portion of Route 16 on 1 April 1963, shortening Route 127 to its current route.

== In popular culture ==
Japanese Bōsōzoku rock group Kishidan referenced this route in their debut album, an independently released mini-album titled Bousou Yotarou Rock 'n' Roll where the final song was called "Kokudou 127 Gousen no Shiroki Inazuma" (國道127號線の白き稻妻). Several of the group's members are from Chiba Prefecture, where the route is located.

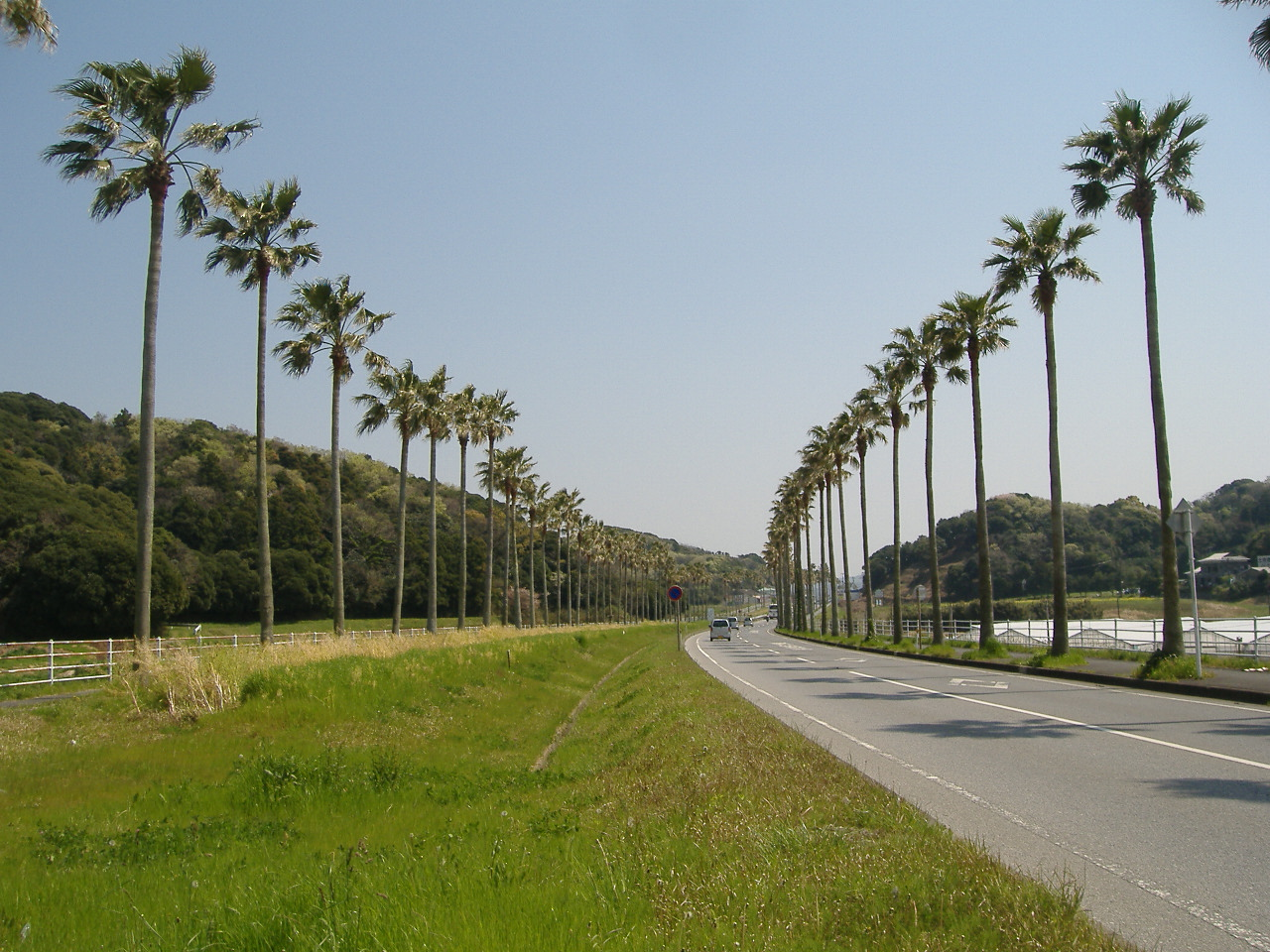
Tateyama Bypass
