= Mineoka Mountain District =

Area in the southern part of the Chiba Prefecture

- Mineoka-sanchi
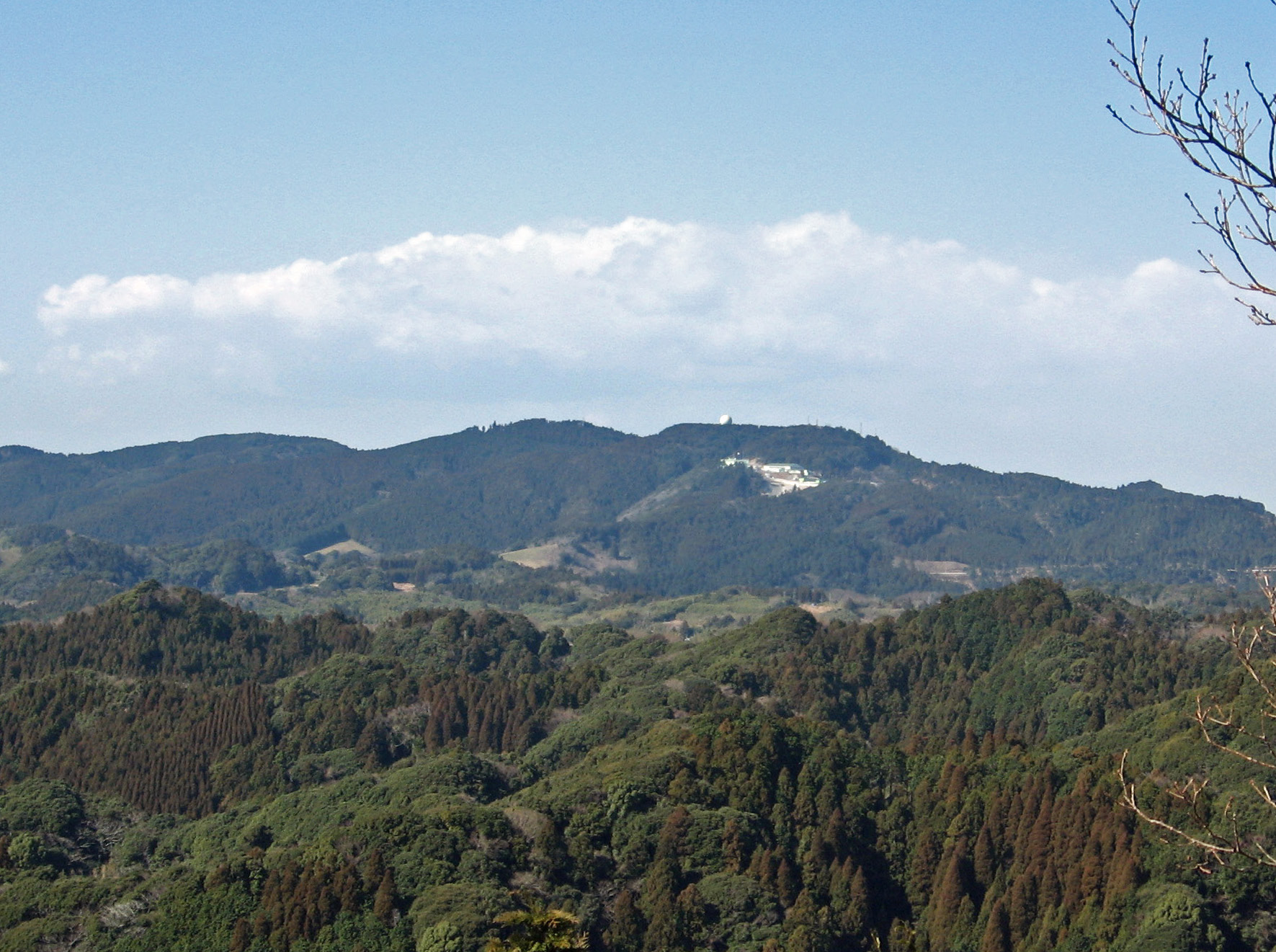
- View of Mount Atago and hills of Mineoka Mountain District

Highest point
- Coordinates: 35°6′53″N 139°59′12″E

Naming
- Language of name: Japanese
- Pronunciation: [mineokasaɲtɕi]

Geography
- Location within Japan
- Location: Chiba Prefecture, Honshu, Japan

Climbing
- Easiest route: Hike

Mineoka Mountain District (嶺岡山地, Mineoka-sanchi) is an area in the Bōsō Hill Range in the southern part of Chiba Prefecture. The Mineoka Mountain District runs along an east–west line across the southern part of the Bōsō Peninsula from the southern bank of the Kamo River in Kamogawa, facing the Pacific Ocean, to the Sakuma District of Kyonan, facing Tokyo Bay. The highest peak in the mountain district is at Mount Atago 408.2 m (1,339 ft) Mineoka is formed from two kanji characters: the first "嶺", meaning 'peak' or 'summit' and the second "岡" meaning 'mount' or 'hill.'

== Geology ==
The area is noted for its numerous landslides, particularly in Kamogawa. The Mineoka Mountain District is composed of igneous rocks such as serpentinite, basalt, and granite; mudstone is also found in great quantity. Shale from the mountain district was used extensively in the region to make tools during the Japanese Paleolithic.

== Jurisdictions ==
The Mineoka Mountain District crosses five jurisdictions in Chiba Prefecture.

- Minamibōsō
- Kamogawa
- Tateyama
- Kyonan
- Futtsu

== Prominent mountains ==
- Mount Atago
- Mount Karasuba
- Mount Nokogiri
- Mount Tomi

== History ==
=== Early history ===
Historically the Mineoka Mountain District was part of Awa Province and the southern part of Kazusa Province in pre-modern Japan. Numerous shrines and temples were constructed as early as the Nara period, and many of them remain active to this day. Under the Ritsuryō system of Nara-period Japan it is thought the area was used for extensive pasture land for horses. During the Sengoku period these small-scale ranches were revived by the Satomi clan, a powerful clan based in Awa Province.

=== Later history ===
Minamoto no Yoshitsune's gunki monogatari war tale, the Gikeiki mentions the landing of a boat party on Cape Sunosaki at the southern end of the Mineoka Mountain District. The Tokugawa Shogunate took direct control of the Mineoka pasture land, which lies between present-day Minamibōsō and Kamogawa. As a result of the Edicts on Compassion for Living Things (生類憐みの令, Shōruiawareminorei) promulgated by Tokugawa Tsunayoshi's (1646 – 1709), the use of horses throughout Japan was deemphasized. The Mineoka Mountain District was also badly hit by the 1703 Genroku earthquake. As a result, the Tokugawa shogunate divided the area into five small-scale ranches, which were used to produce dairy products, an industry that continues to this day.

=== Modern history ===
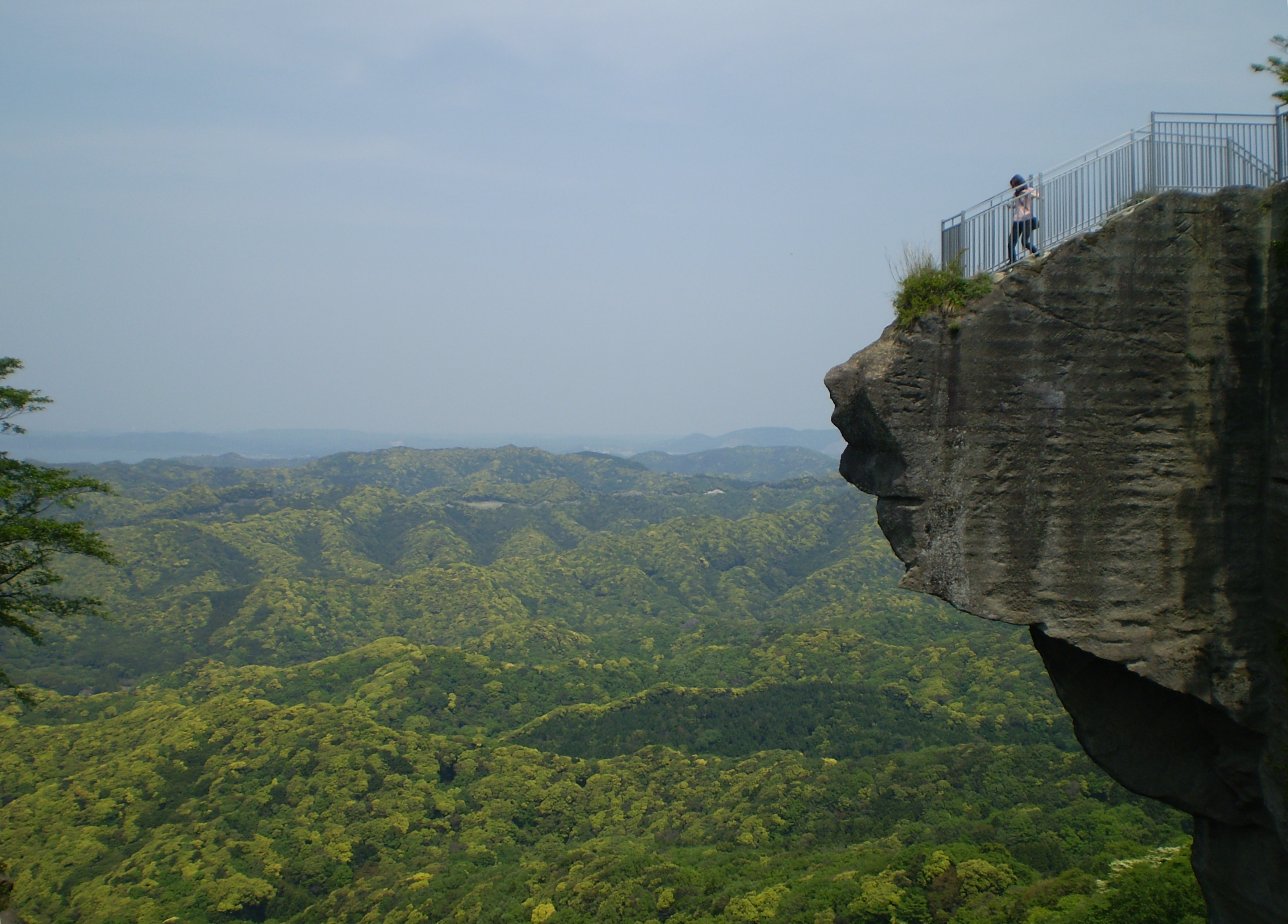
"Jigoku Nozomi" Viewpoint at Mt. Nokogiri

The relative inaccessibility of the district, as well as its proximity to the capitol in Tokyo, led to the construction of military facilities at Mount Atago during World War II. The summit was confiscated by the United States Air Force, but was returned to the Japan Air Self-Defense Force (JASDF). It is now home to the strategically important JASDF Mineokayama Sub-Base.

== In literature ==
- Tomi-san in the Mineoka Mountain District is the setting for Kyokutei Bakin's 106 volume epic novel Nansō Satomi Hakkenden (南總里見八犬傳), published late in the Edo period between 1814 and 1842.

== Notable places ==
- Mount Tomi Prefectural Park, rich with broad-leaved trees, including castanopsis, live oak, camellia, as well as large stands of Japanese cedar.
- The sprawling Nihon-ji temple complex, home to two Daibutsu sculptures, accessible by the Nokogiriyama Ropeway.
- Views of the Uraga Channel from Cape Myōgane.
- Sunosaki Lighthouse, Sunosaki Shrine, and Yōrō-ji on Cape Sunosaki.

== Transportation ==
The Mineoka Mountain District is accessible by national and prefectural roads, several bus lines, and two JR East railway lines: the JR East Uchibō Line and the JR East Sotobō Line.

== Hiking ==
The Mineoka Mountain District is a popular hiking destination. Most of the mountains in the district can be climbed within a day. Mount Atago, however, can only be visited with permission due to the presence of the JASDF Mineokayama Sub-Base.
