= Bōsō =

"Bōsō" may refer to:

- Bōsō, an informal area
- Bōsō Peninsula
- Bōsō Hill Range
