= Emi Station =

Railway station in Kamogawa, Chiba Prefecture, Japan

Emi Station 江見駅
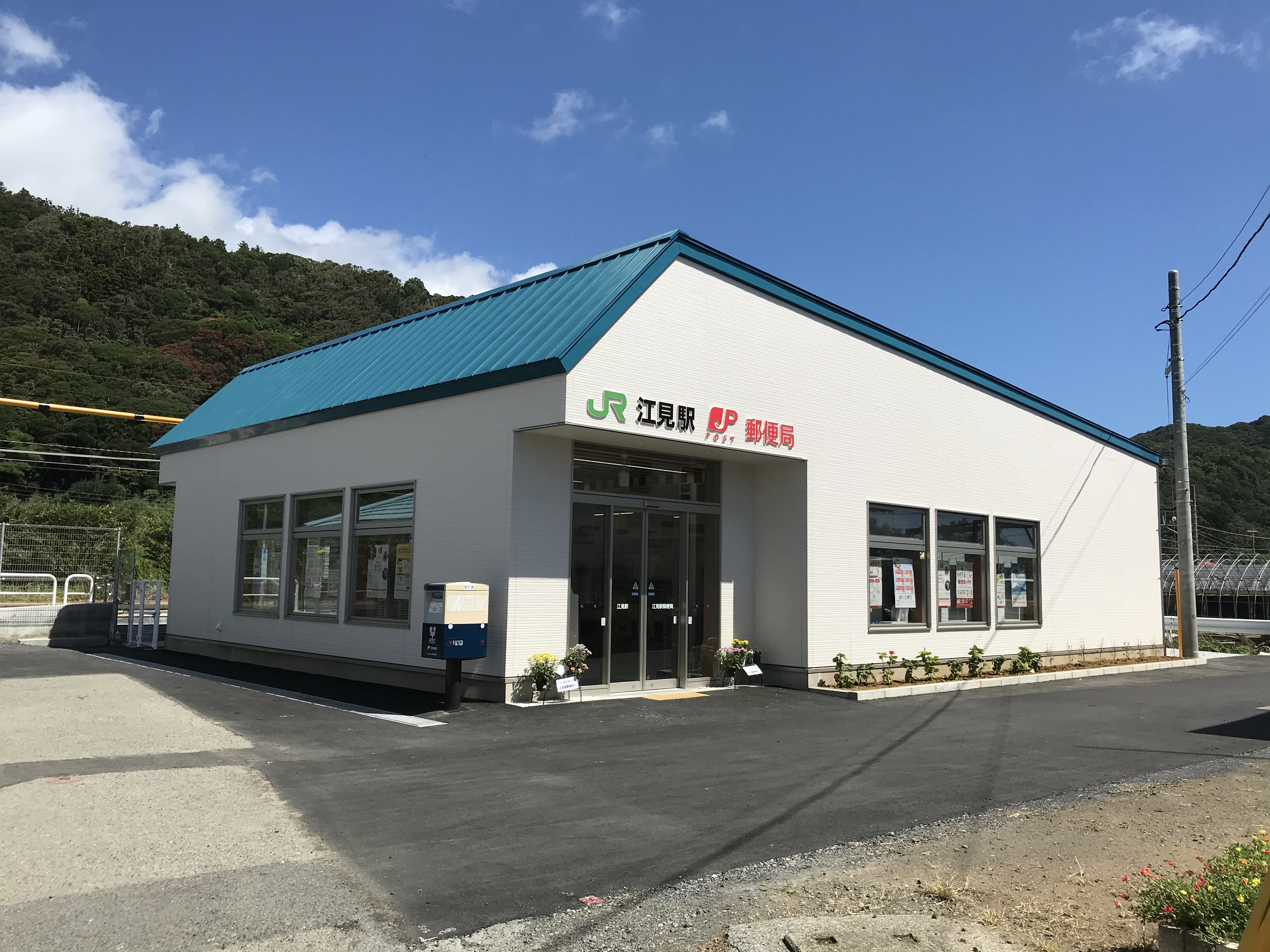
- Emi Station in February 2020

General information
- Location: Nishiemi-94, Kamogawa-shi, Chiba-ken 299-2841; Japan
- Coordinates: 35.0626°N 140.0612°E
- Operator: JR East
- Line: ■ Uchibō Line
- Distance: 111.4 km from Soga
- Platforms: 2 side platforms

Other information
- Status: Staffed
- Website: Official website

History
- Opened: December 20, 1922

Passengers
- FY2018: 80

Services
Preceding station	JR East	Following station
Wadaura towards Soga or Chiba	Uchibō Line Local	Futomi towards Awa-Kamogawa
Location
- Location within Chiba Prefecture Location within Japan

Emi Station (江見駅, Emi-eki) is a passenger railway station in the city of Kamogawa, Chiba Prefecture, Japan, operated by the East Japan Railway Company (JR East).

== Lines ==
Emi Station is served by the Uchibo Line, and is located 111.4 kilometers from the terminus of the Uchibō Line at Soga Station.

== Station layout ==
Emi Station has two opposed side platforms serving two tracks connected by a footbridge. The station is a Kan'i itaku station operated by the Japan Post Service. The station building is also a post office.

=== Platform ===
1	■ Uchibō Line	For Chiba, Soga
2	■ Uchibō Line	For Awa-Kamogawa

== History ==
Emi Station was opened on December 20, 1922. The station was absorbed into the JR East network upon the privatization of the Japan National Railways (JNR) on April 1, 1987.

== Passenger statistics ==
In fiscal 2018, the station was used by an average of 80 passengers daily (boarding passengers only).

== Surrounding area ==
- Mount Karasuba
- National Route 128

== See also ==
- List of railway stations in Japan
