= Mount Tomi =

Mountain in Chiba prefecture, Japan

- Tomi-san
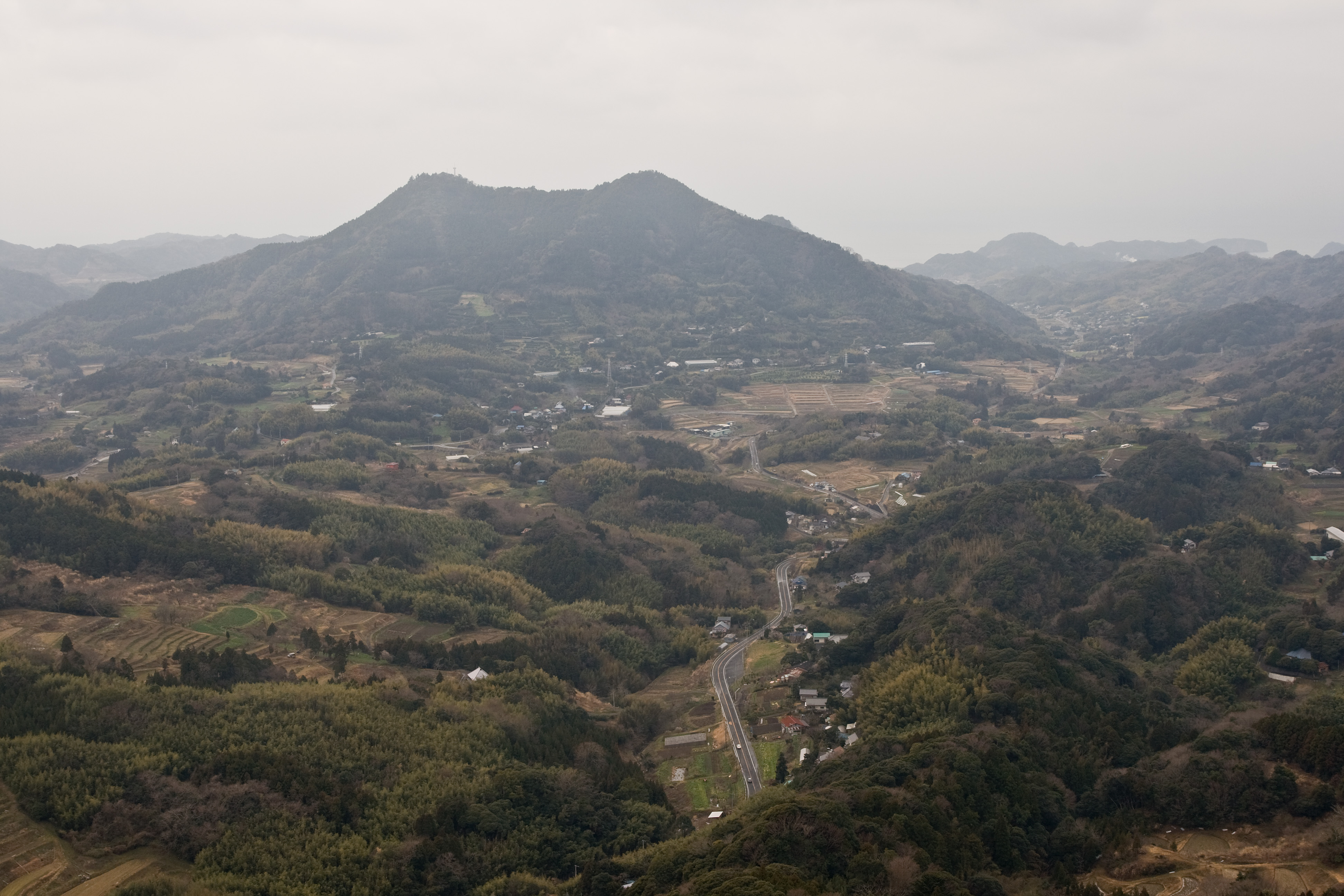
- View of Mount Tomi from Mount Iyogatake, Minamibōsō, Chiba

Highest point
- Elevation: 349.5 m (1,147 ft)
- Coordinates: 35°5′56″N 139°52′53″E

Naming
- Language of name: Japanese
- Pronunciation: [tomisan]

Geography
- Location within Japan
- Location: Chiba Prefecture, Honshu, Japan

Climbing
- Easiest route: Hike

Mount Tomi (富山, Tomi-san) is a mountain on the border of the city of Minamibōsō, in southern Chiba Prefecture. The mountain is formed by two peaks. The north, called Konpira Peak, is 349.5 m (1,147 ft), and the south, called Kannon Peak, is 342 m (1,122 ft). Mount Tomi is one of the mountains of the Mineoka Mountain District of the Bōsō Hill Range.

== Origin of name ==
The kanji for Mount Tomi, 富, means 'wealth' or 'abundance'. The name of Mount Tomi is said to be derived from the semi-mythical figure Ame-no-tomi-no-mikoto (天富命). According to tradition Ame-no-tomi-no-mikoto, historically associated with the Emperor Jinmu, developed the Bōsō Peninsula region, and is now associated with the nearby Awa Shrine. The former town of Tomiyama, now absorbed as part of Minamibōsō, is named for the mountain.

== Mount Tomi Prefectural Park ==
The area around the mountain has been designated as Mount Tomi Prefectural Park (富山県立自然公園). The western foot of Mount Tomi is rich with broad-leaved trees, including castanopsis, live oak, camellia, as well as large stands of Japanese cedar.

== In literature ==
Tomi-san is the setting for Kyokutei Bakin's 106 volume epic novel Nansō Satomi Hakkenden (南總里見八犬傳), published late in the Edo period between 1814 and 1842. Mount Tomi appears in the novel as Toyama, the home of Princess Fuse.

== Hiking ==
The mountain is popular as a hiking destination. The viewing platform on the north peak offers views of the surrounding area and Miura Peninsula.

== Transportation ==
The hiking trail that leads to Mount Tomi is accessible by bus from the Iwai Station in Minamibōsō via the JR East Uchibō Line.
