= Mount Atago (Minamibōsō, Chiba) =

Mountain in Chiba prefecture, Japan

- Atago-yama
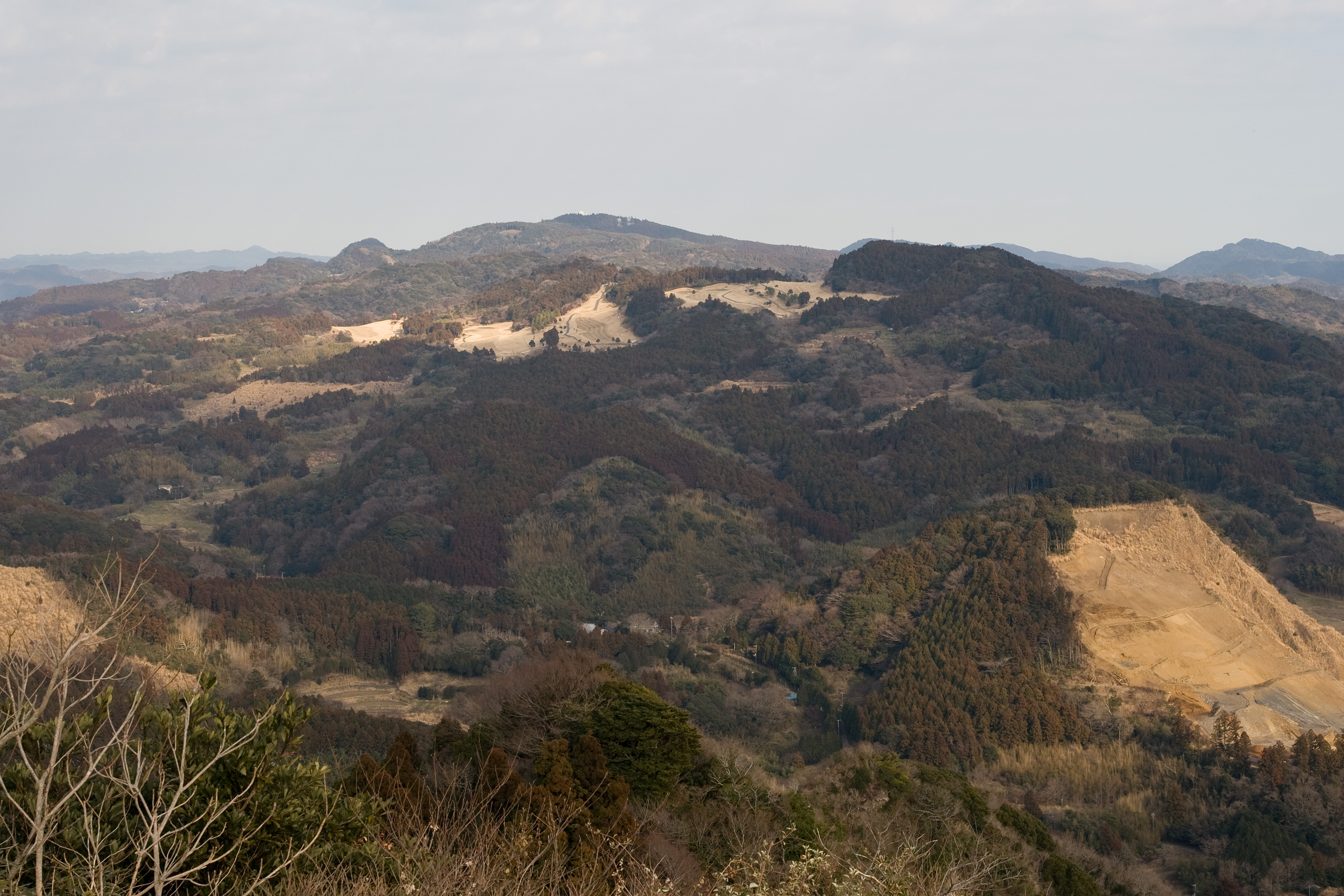
- View of Mount Atago from Mount Iyogatake, Minamibōsō, Chiba

Highest point
- Elevation: 408.2 m (1,339 ft)
- Coordinates: 35°6′53″N 139°59′12″E

Naming
- Language of name: Japanese
- Pronunciation: [ataɡojama]

Geography
- Location within Japan
- Location: Chiba Prefecture, Honshu, Japan
- Parent range: Bōsō Hill Range

Climbing
- Easiest route: Hike

Mount Atago (愛宕山, Atago-yama) is a mountain on the border of the cities of Minamibōsō and Kamogawa in Chiba Prefecture, Japan with an altitude of 408.2 m (1,339 ft). It is the highest point in Chiba Prefecture. Mount Atago is at the west of the Mineoka Mountain District of the Bōsō Hill Range. The kanji for Mount Atago, 愛 and 宕, mean 'love' and 'cave' respectively. The mountain is also known as Mineoka Atago-yama as several other hills and mountains share the same name in Japan, most notably Mount Atago in the Tamba Mountains to the northwest of Kyōto.

== History ==
Mount Atago was located in the historical Awa Province, which occupied the southern tip of the Bōsō Peninsula. Minamoto no Yoritomo (1147–1199), founder and first shōgun of the Kamakura shogunate, visited Awa Province shortly before his return to Kyōto and the establishment of the shogunate. He visited Mount Atago, dedicated a Jizō Bosatsu statue at the summit of the mountain, and vowed to return to the area.

== JASDF Mineokayama Sub-Base ==
Mount Atago is now home to the JASDF Mineokayama Sub-Base, an air defence radar installation of the Japan Air Self-Defense Force (JASDF). The summit was confiscated by the United States Air Force in 1955, then later transferred to the JASDF. Construction on the radar facility began in 1978 and is considered to be strategically important to the defense of Japan. The mountain is also home to a triangulation station and the Atago Shrine.

== Hiking ==
Mount Atago is open to the public only by permission of the JASDF. Hiking requires permission, at least a week in advance, from the JASDF Mineokayama Sub-Base. Permission is not always granted. Photography of the radar facility is not permitted. Access to the triangulation station is not allowed. The summit of Mount Atago is the highest in Japan not open to the public.
