= Miura Coast =

Coastline in Kanagawa Prefecture, Japan

Miura Coast (Japanese: 三浦海岸, miura kaigan) is located in the southeastern part of the Miura Peninsula in Kanagawa Prefecture.

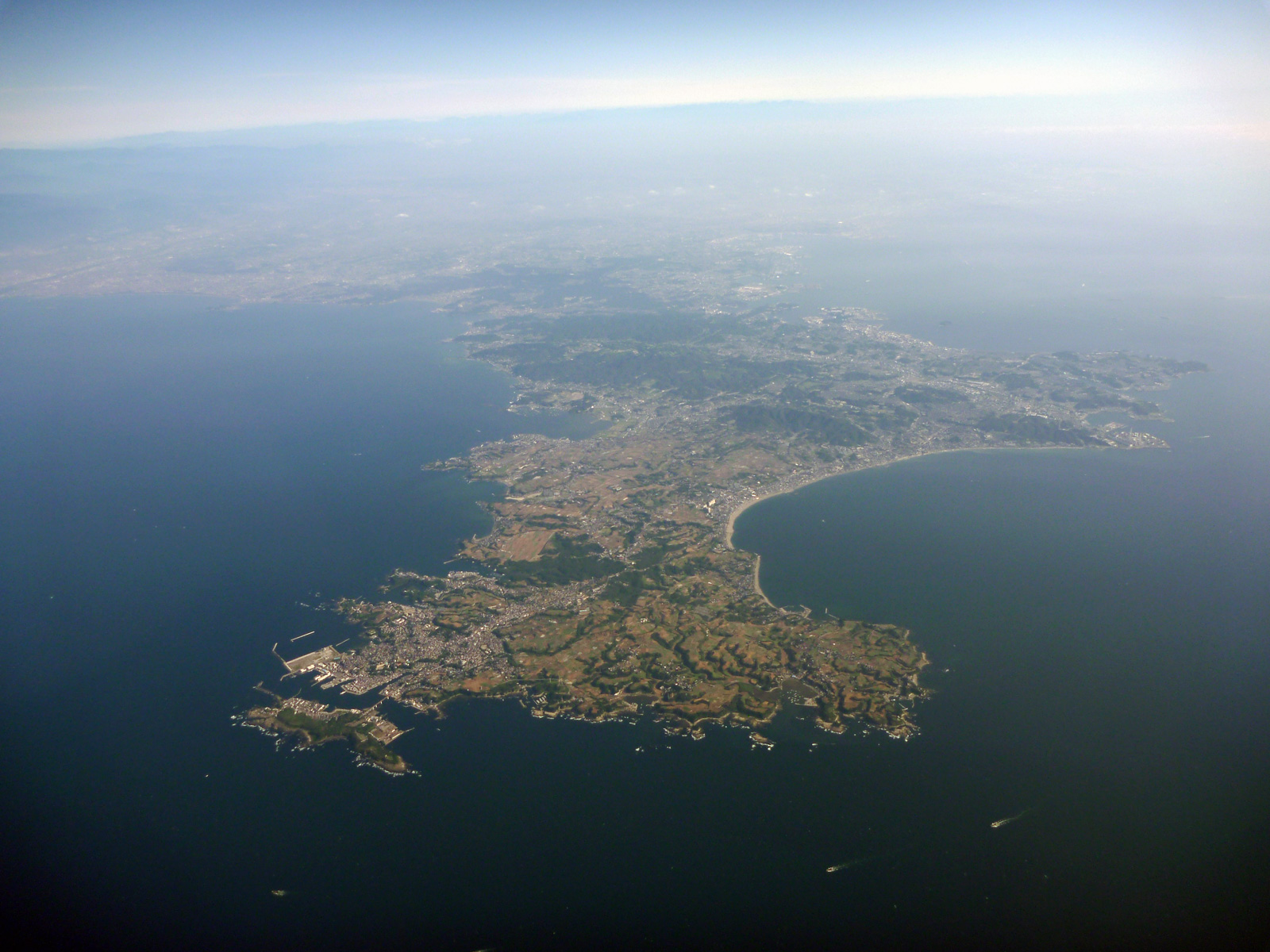
Location of the Miura Coast on the Miura Peninsula

== Summary ==
Generally, Miura Coast refers to the coast that forms a gentle arc extending about 10 km from Nobi, Yokosuka to Kaneda Minamishita-ura, Miura, surrounding Kaneda Bay, which faces the Uraga Channel at the entrance to Tokyo Bay. If one wants to be more specific, it refers to the southern half of Miura City's arc, especially the beaches, connected to Tsukuihama on the north side and Kikuna Beach on the south side. The beaches are usually open until the end of September because, unusually for Japan, jellyfish rarely appear after the Bon Festival.

The beach was not opened for the 2022 season because there were no applicants to set up beach houses. This is the first time this has happened in the beach's history.

== Scenery ==
Facing the Boso Peninsula across Kaneda Bay and the Uraga Channel, the view looks as if it were a lake on days when the waves are calm.

It is often used as a filming location for movies, TV dramas, and commercial messages. This is probably due to its easy accessibility from central Tokyo and the whiter color of its sand compared to that of Shonan Beach.

Drying daikon radish for making pickled dumplings is a tradition during the winter. However, the Miura daikon, once a specialty of the area, has almost disappeared, and the main product has shifted to the Aokubi daikon.

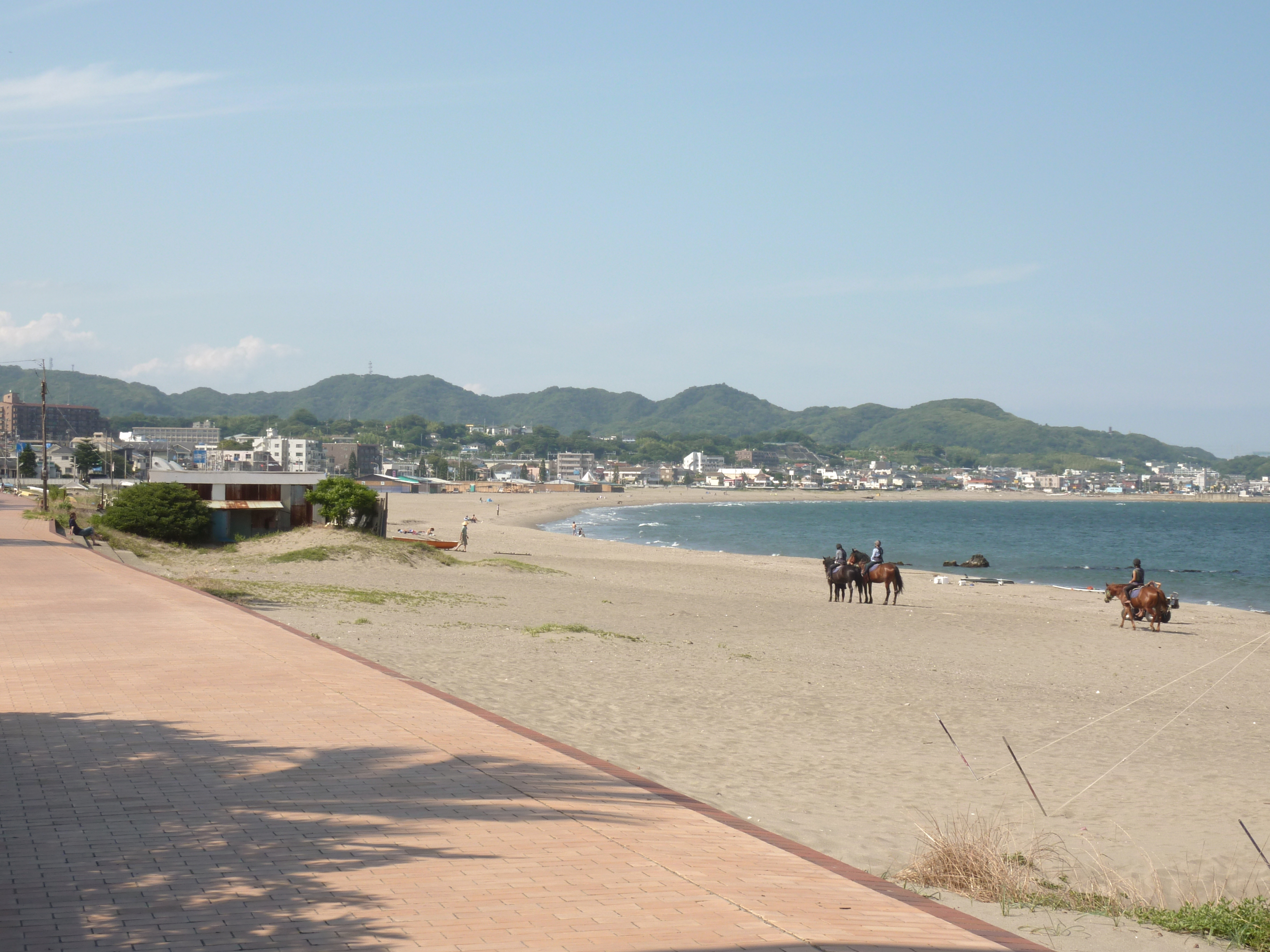
Miura Beach

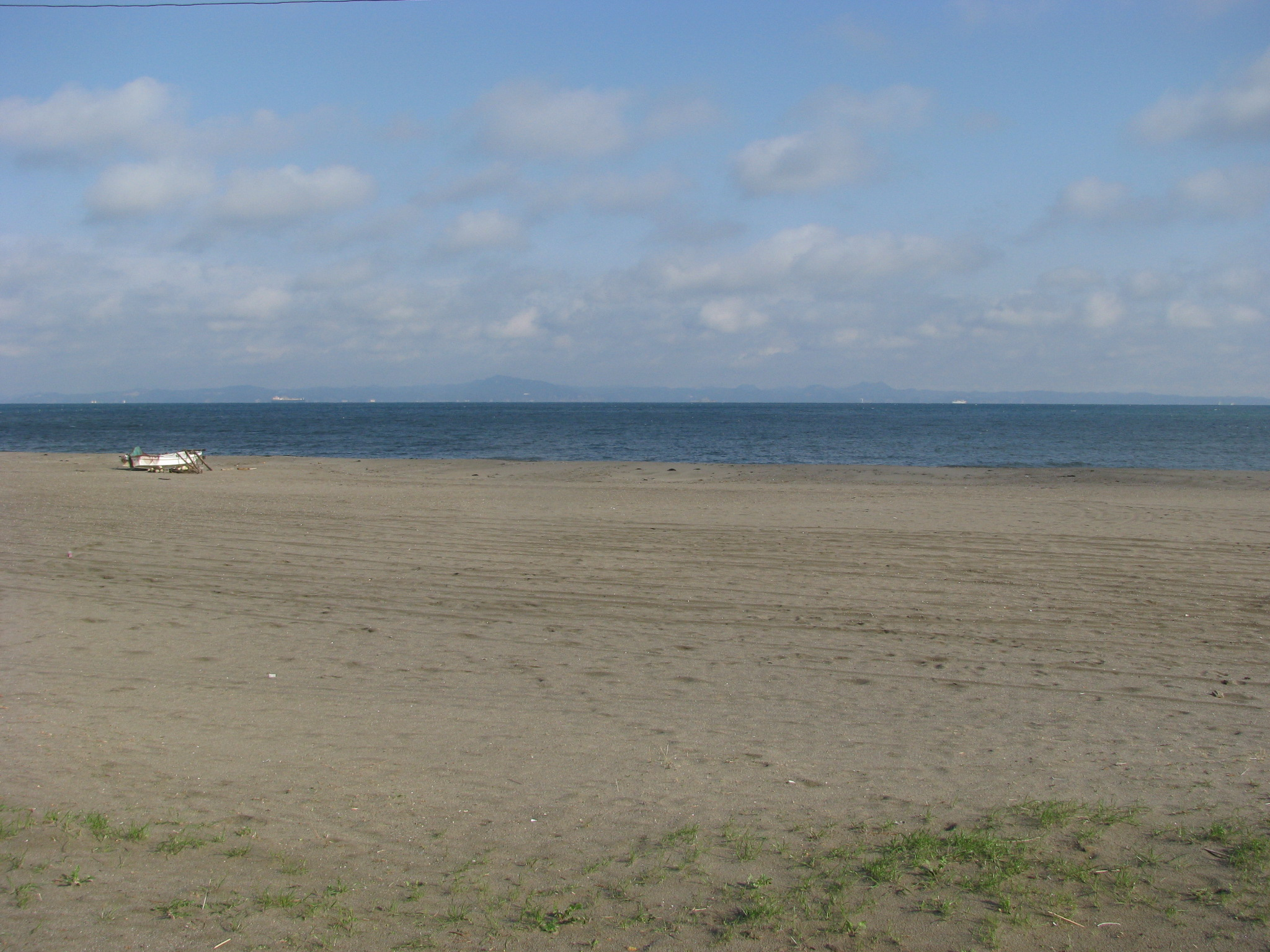
The Boso Peninsula is visible across the Uraga Channel.

== Related Items ==
- Uraga Channel
