= Mount Nokogiri (Chiba) =

Mountain near Tokyo Bay

- 鋸山
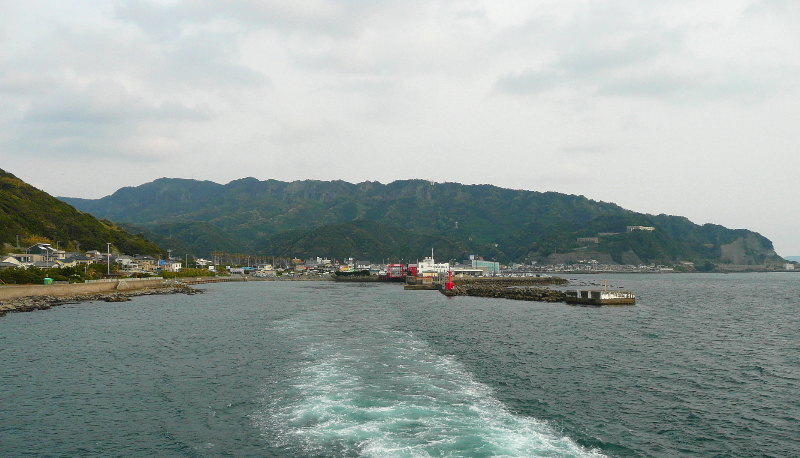
- Mount Nokogiri as seen from the northwest

Highest point
- Elevation: 329.5 m (1,081 ft)
- Listing: List of mountains and hills of Japan by height
- Coordinates: 35°9′37″N 139°50′27″E

Naming
- English translation: (wood)saw mountain
- Language of name: Japanese

Geography
- Location: Honshu, Japan
- Parent range: Bōsō Peninsula
- Topo map(s): Geographical Survey Institute 25000:1 保田; 50000:1 横須賀

Mount Nokogiri (鋸山, Nokogiri-yama) literally "saw mountain" is a low mountain on the Bōsō Peninsula on Honshu, Japan. It lies on the southern border of the city of Futtsu and the town Kyonan in Awa District in Chiba Prefecture.

The mountain runs east to west, having the characteristic sawtoothed profile of a Japanese saw (鋸, nokogiri). It falls steeply into Tokyo Bay on its western side, where it is pierced by two road tunnels and a rail tunnel, carrying the Uchibo Line south from Futtsu to Tateyama. Both features are due in part to the mountain's history as a stone quarry in the Edo period, the marks of which are still picturesquely evident.

The western side of the mountain is also the site of the sprawling Nihon-ji temple complex, which is the home of two Daibutsu sculptures - a huge seated carving of Yakushi Nyorai that at 31.05 metres (101.9 ft) tall is the largest pre-modern, stone-carved Daibutsu in Japan, and the "Hundred-shaku Kannon", a tall relief image of Kannon carved into one of the quarry walls – as well as 1500 hand-carved arhat sculptures, which combined with the spectacular scenery of the Bōsō Hills and Tokyo Bay, make Mount Nokogiri a popular tourism destination.

The temple is accessible by road and by a cable car, the Nokogiriyama Ropeway, which runs from Hamakanaya Station on the JR Uchibo Line to a lookout deck near the top of the temple precinct.

The western end of the mountain falls precipitously into Tokyo Bay, where Cape Myōgane (Japanese: 明鐘岬) is a good place to watch large ships pass through Uraga Channel at sunset.

== Jingoro Eirei Ono ==
Artisan Jingoro Eirei Ono and his 27 apprentices carved several major sculptural works at the Nihon-ji temple complex on Mount Nokogiri, including the colossal Nihon-ji and 1,500 Arhat statues. The original statue, depicting the Medicine Buddha, was carved from 1783-1786. The original measured 27 or 37 meters and collapsed due to erosion; the current 31.05-meter statue was rebuilt in 1969. The 1500 unique stone sculptures of Buddhist disciples line the walking paths of the mountain within the Nihon-ji temple complex. The project took much longer, with Ono and his apprentices working on them for about 21 years, from 1779 to 1798.

== Highlights ==
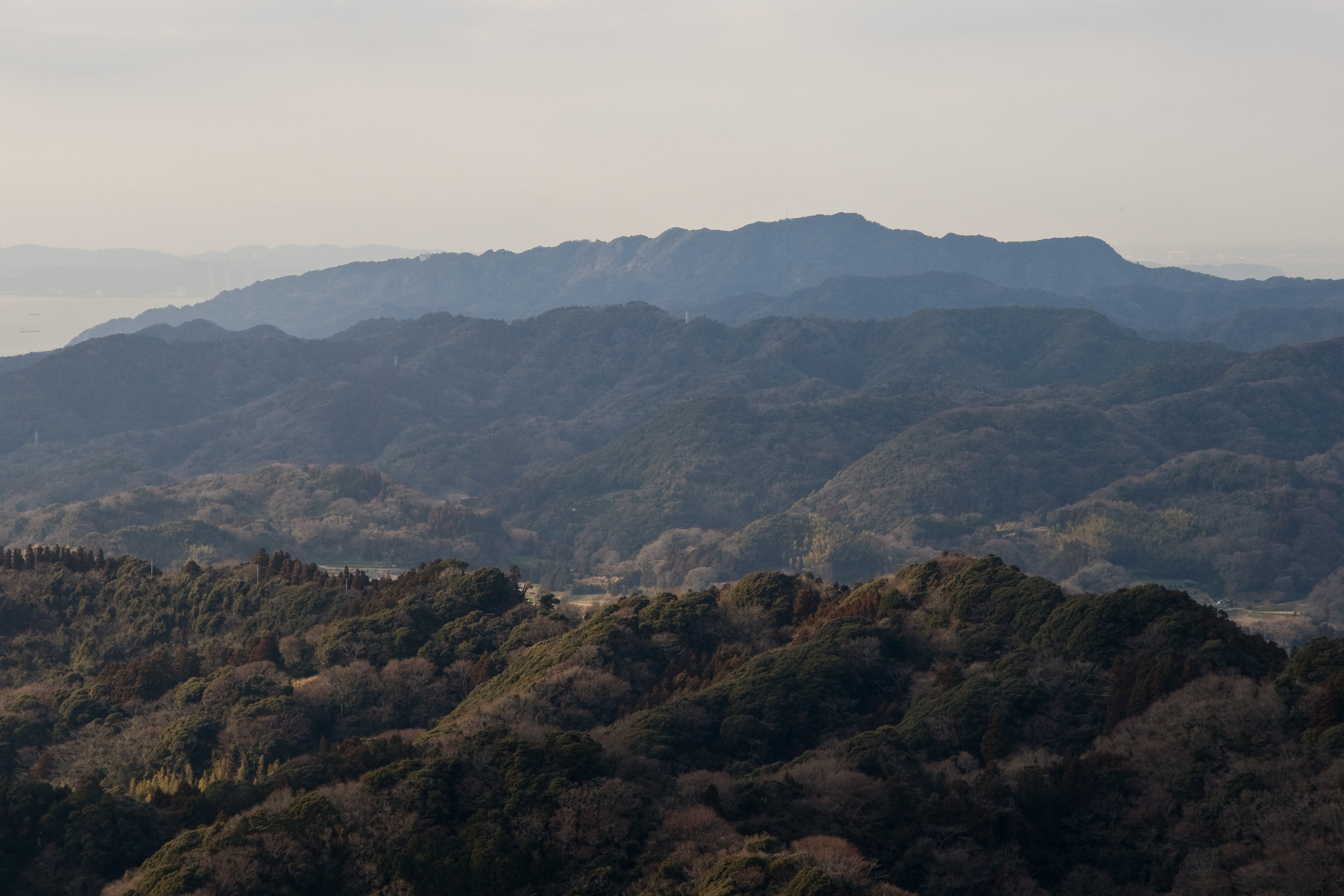
Mount Nokogiri (background) from Mount Iyogatake

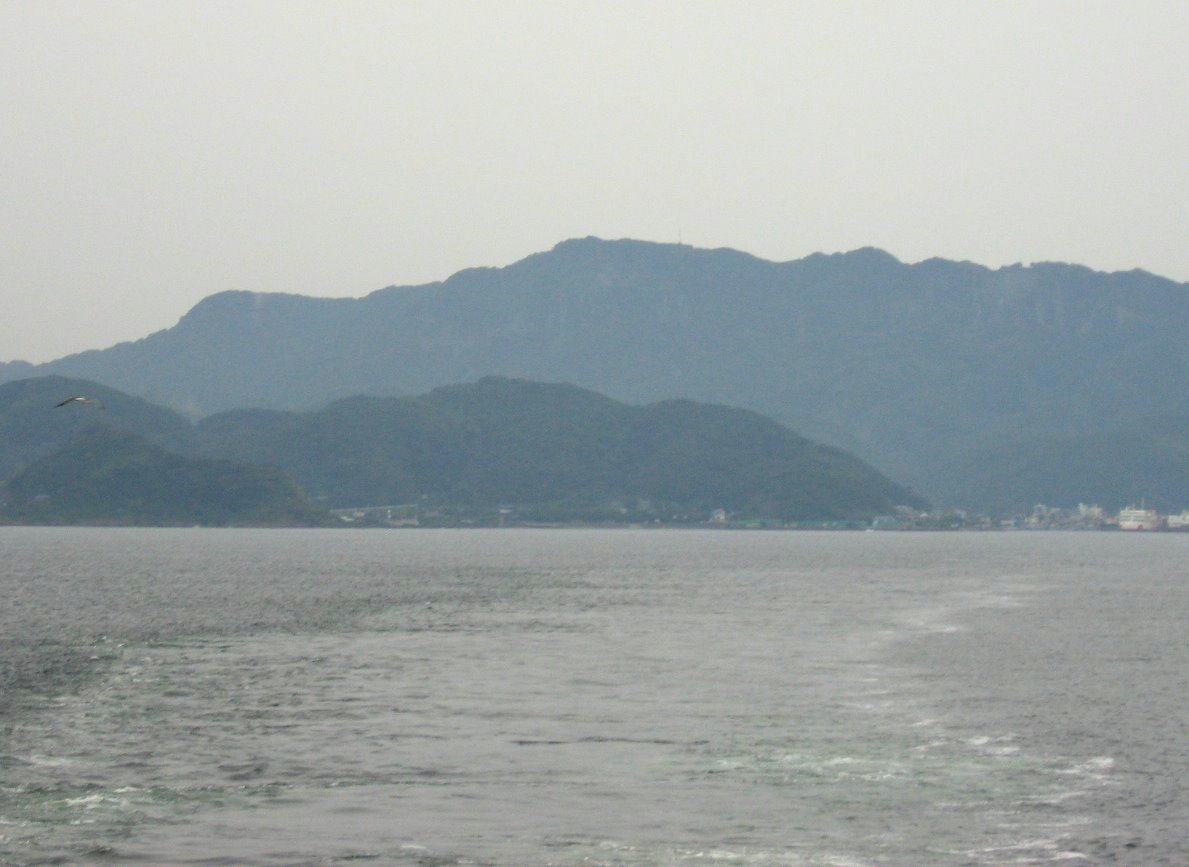
Mount Nokogiri from Tokyo Bay

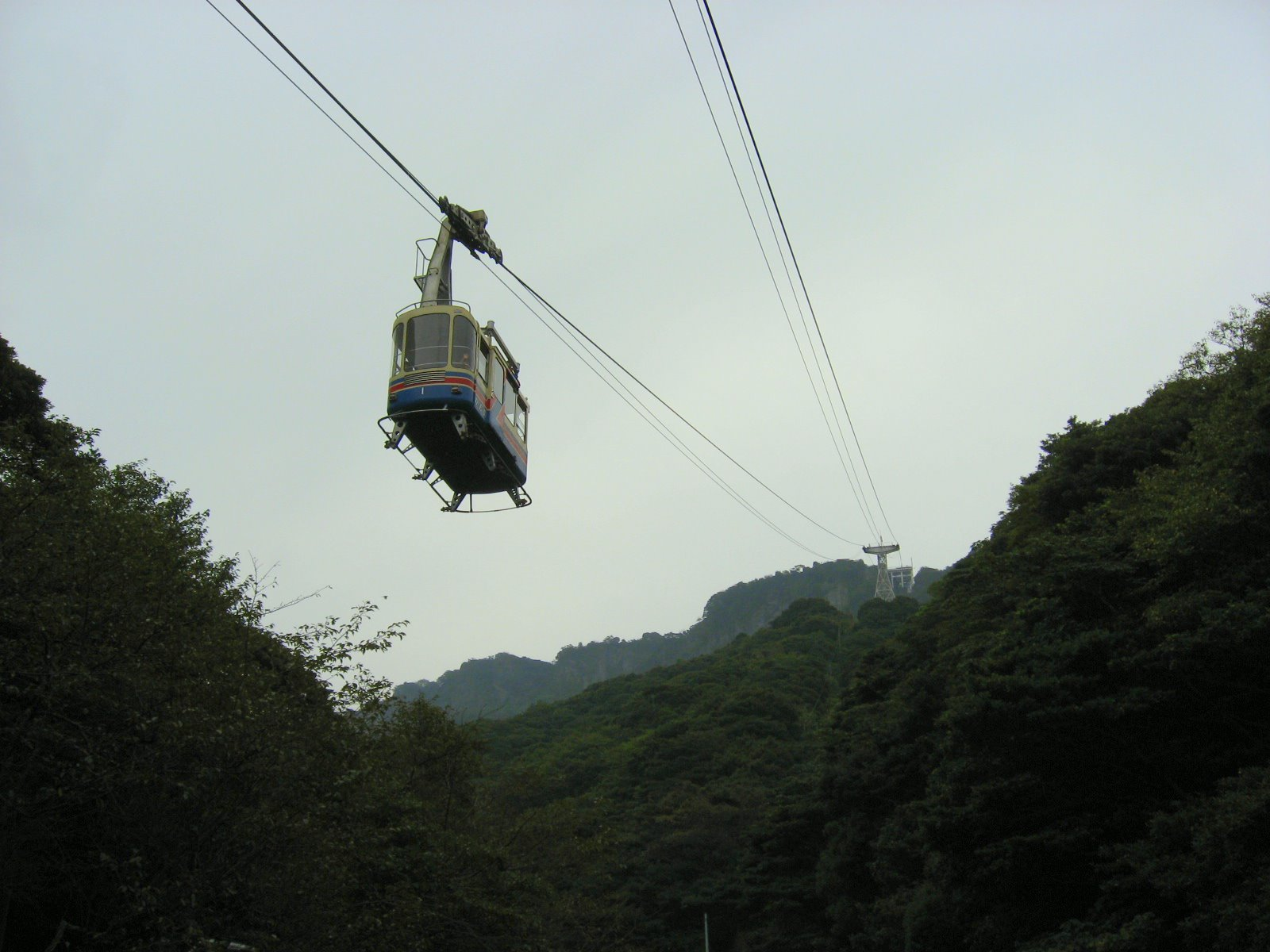
Nokogiriyama Ropeway

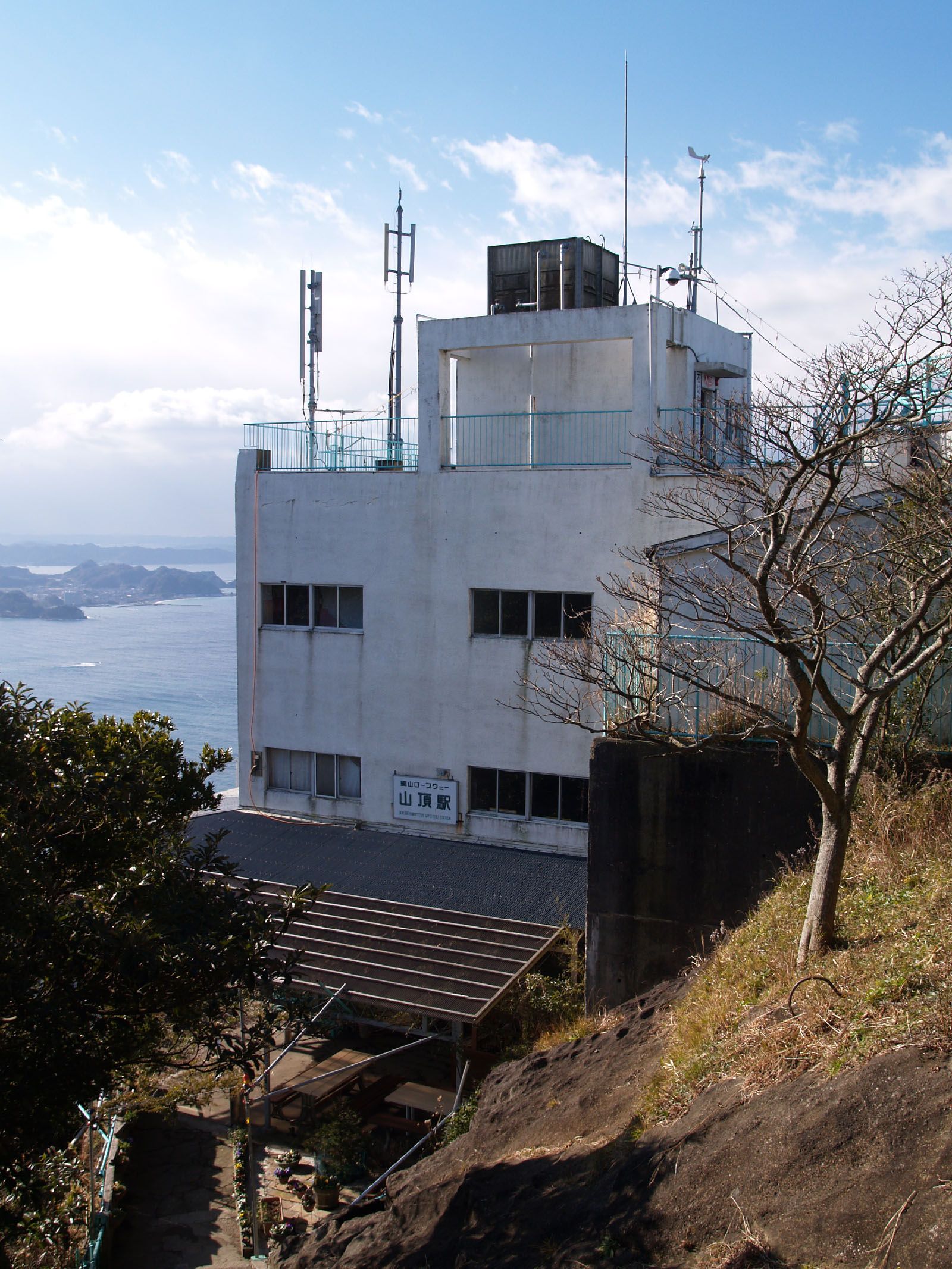
Nokogiriyama Ropeway Summit Station

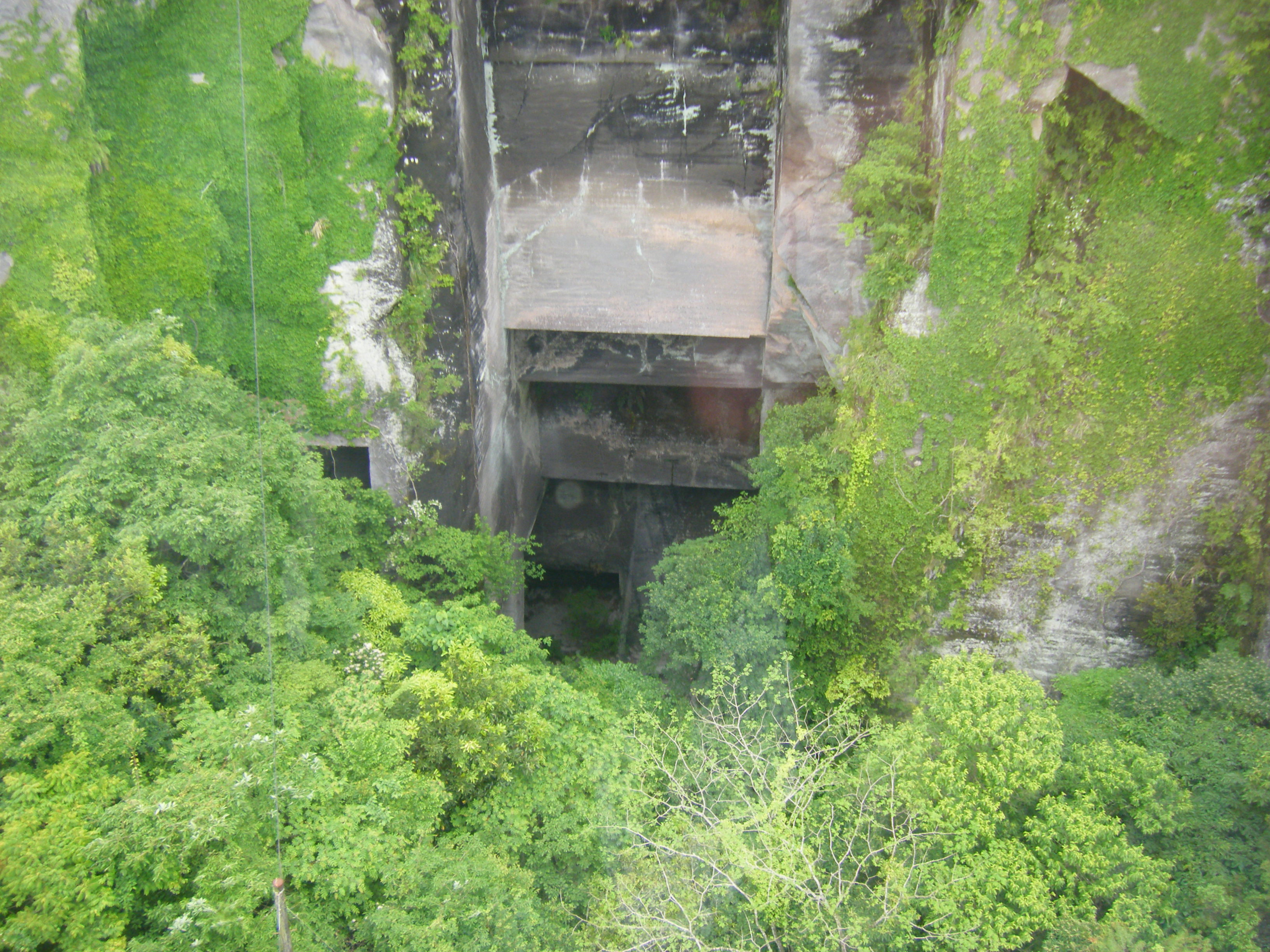
Remains of Nokogiriyama Quarry

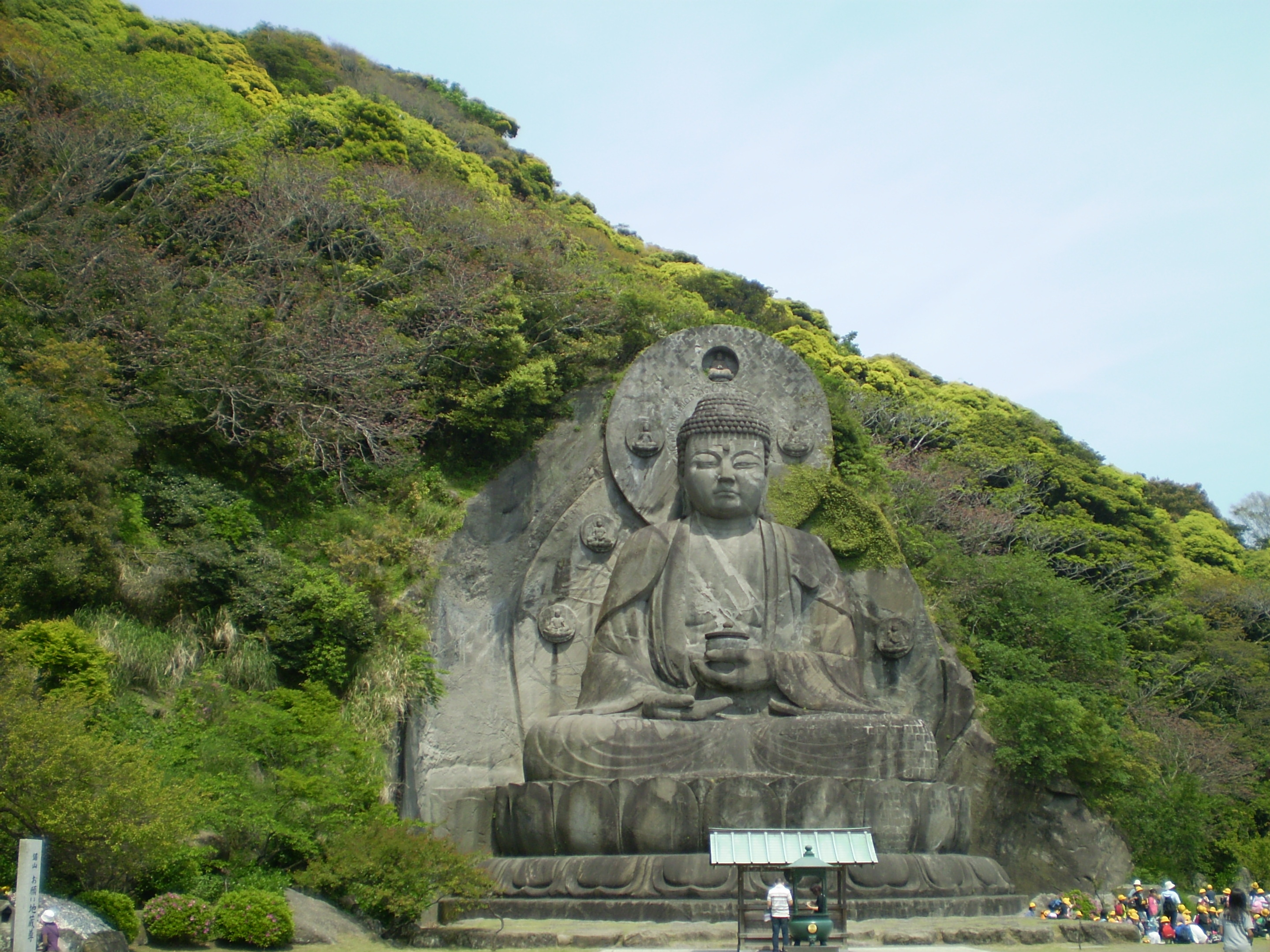
Nihonji Daibutsu (Yakushi Nyorai) (日本寺大仏, Nihon-ji Daibutsu))

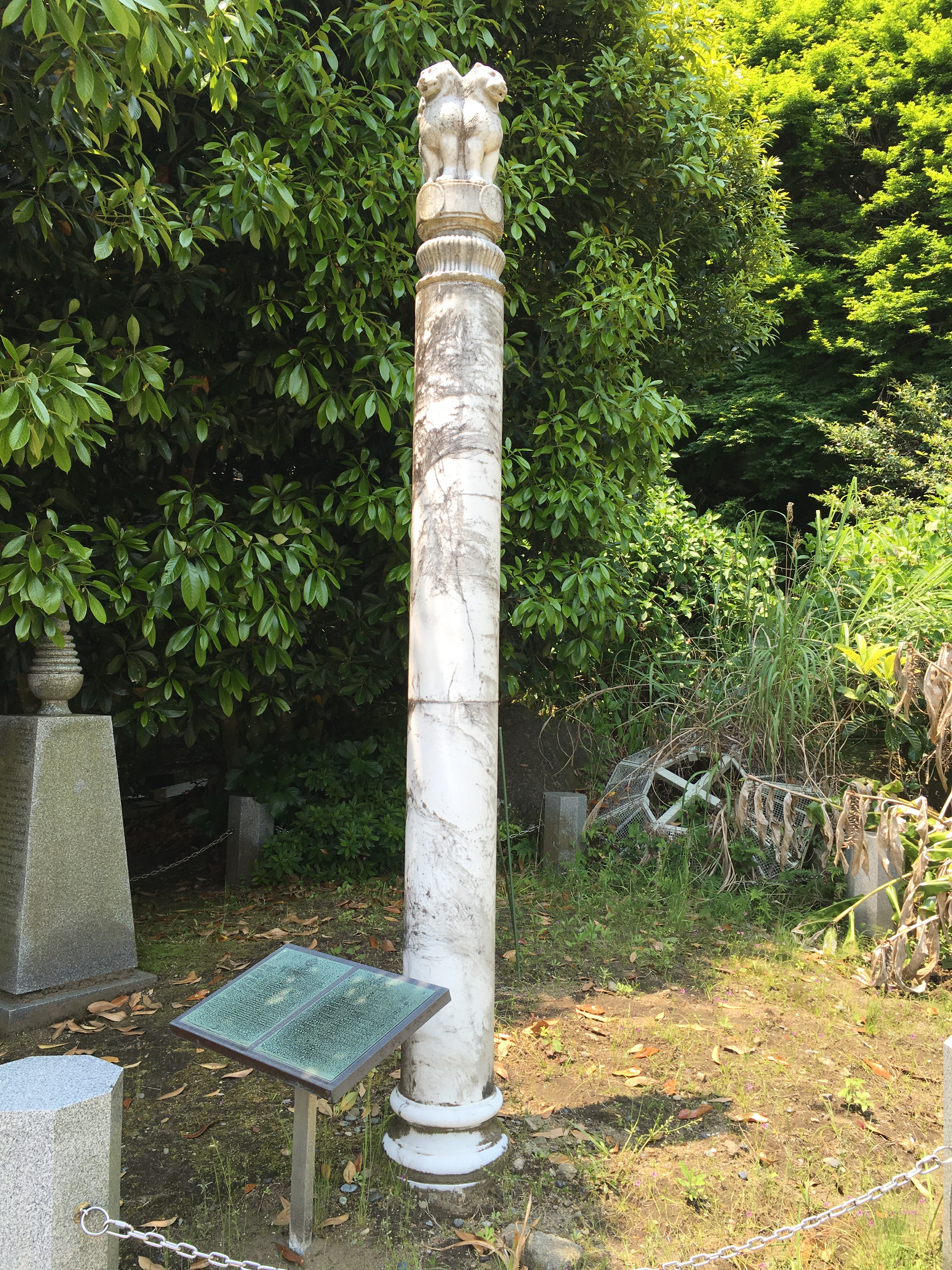
Ashoka Pillar at Nokogiriyama

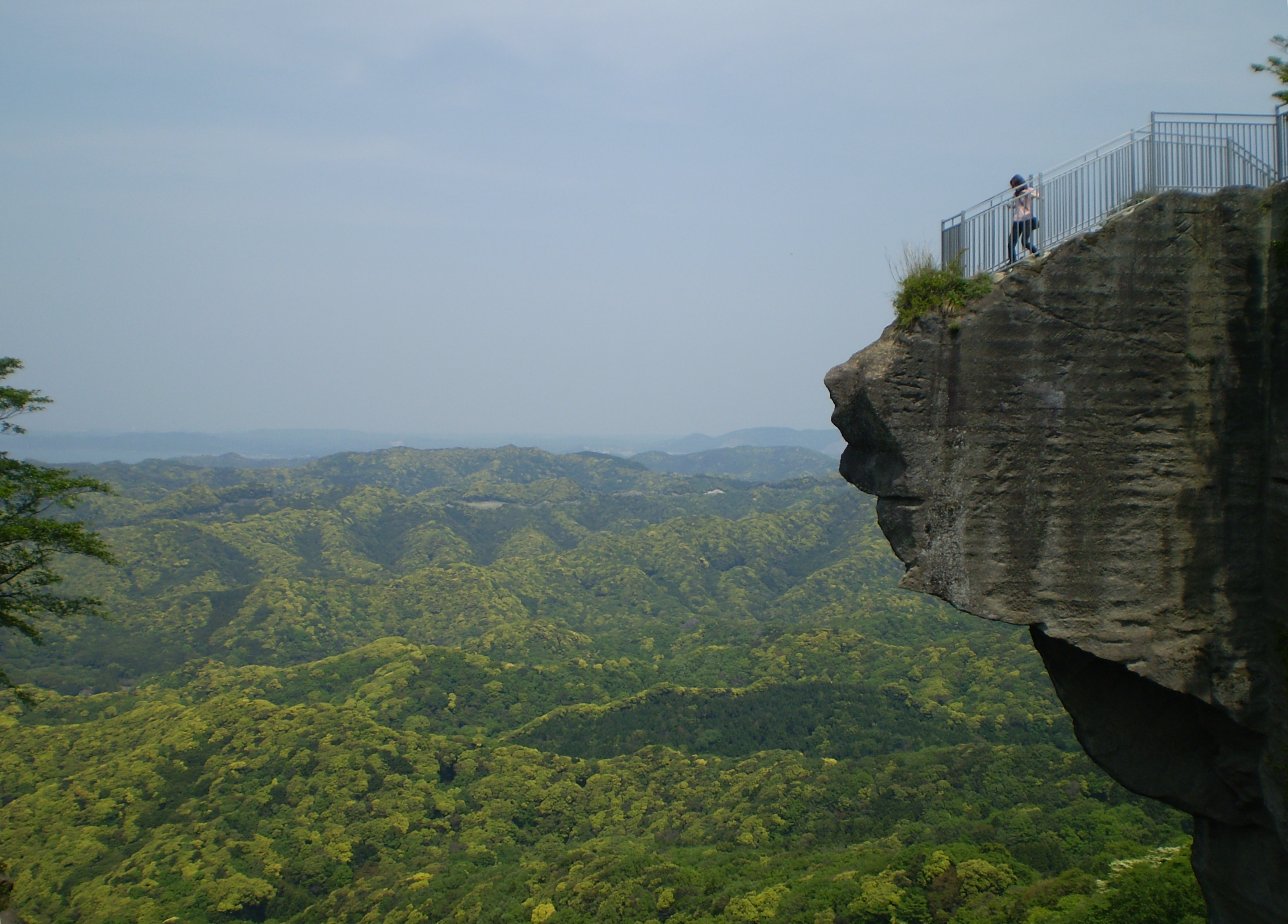
"View of Hell" (地獄のぞき, Jigoku Nozoki)

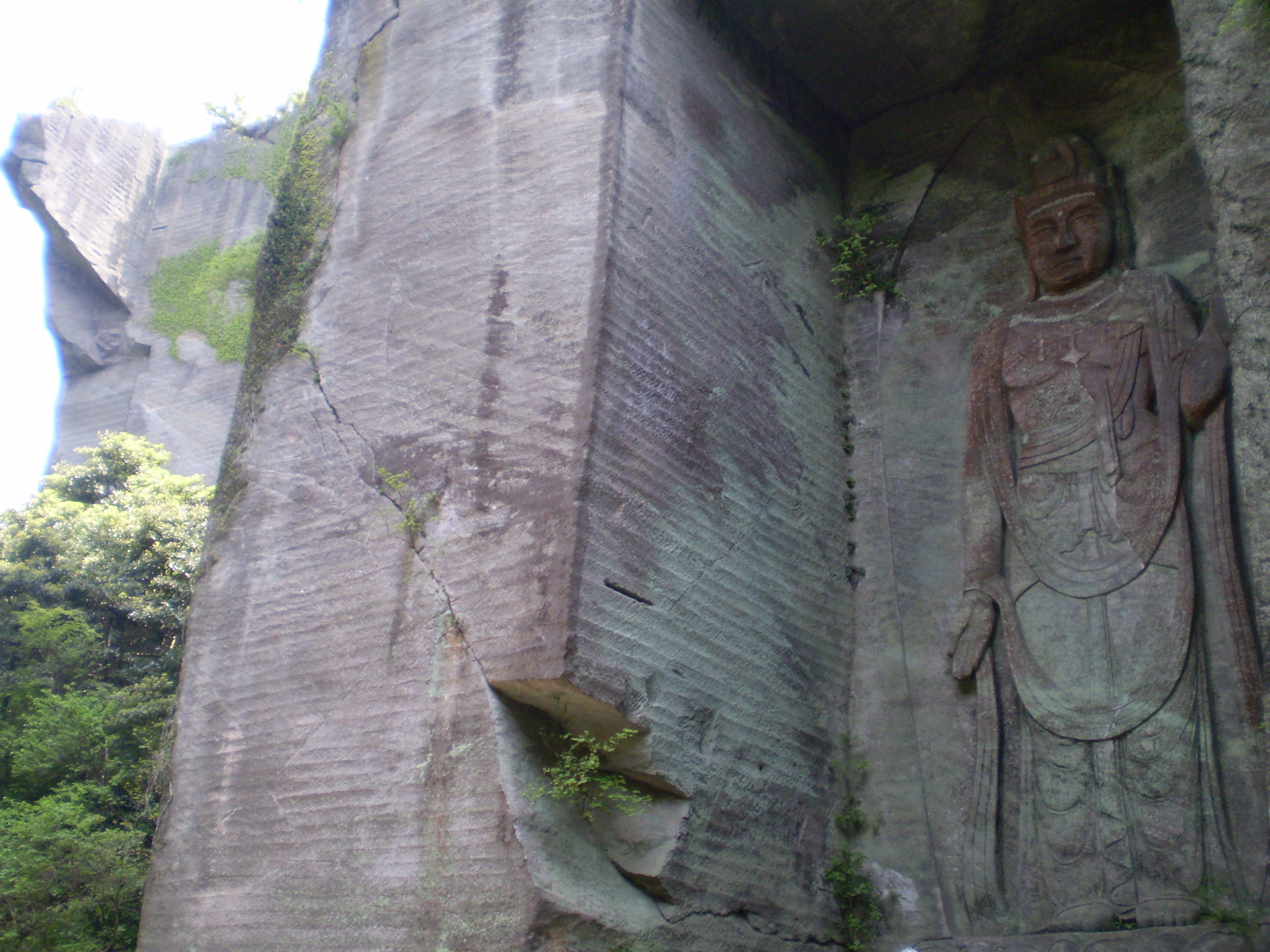
Hundred-shaku Kannon (百尺観音, Hyaku-shaku Kannon)

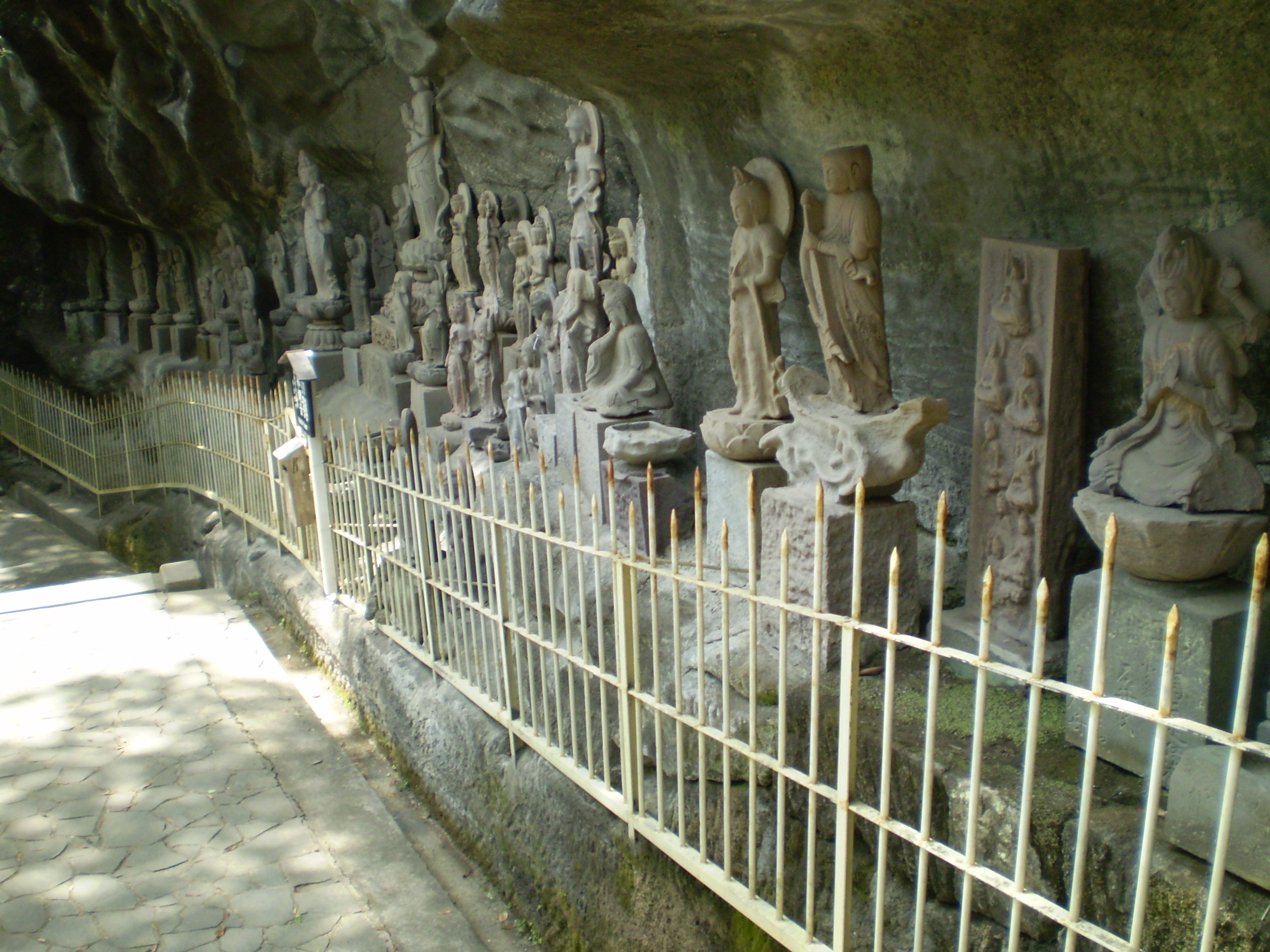
1,500 Arhat (千五百羅漢, Sen-Gohyaku Rakan)
