= Mount Karasuba =

Mountain in Chiba Prefecture, Japan

- Karasuba-yama
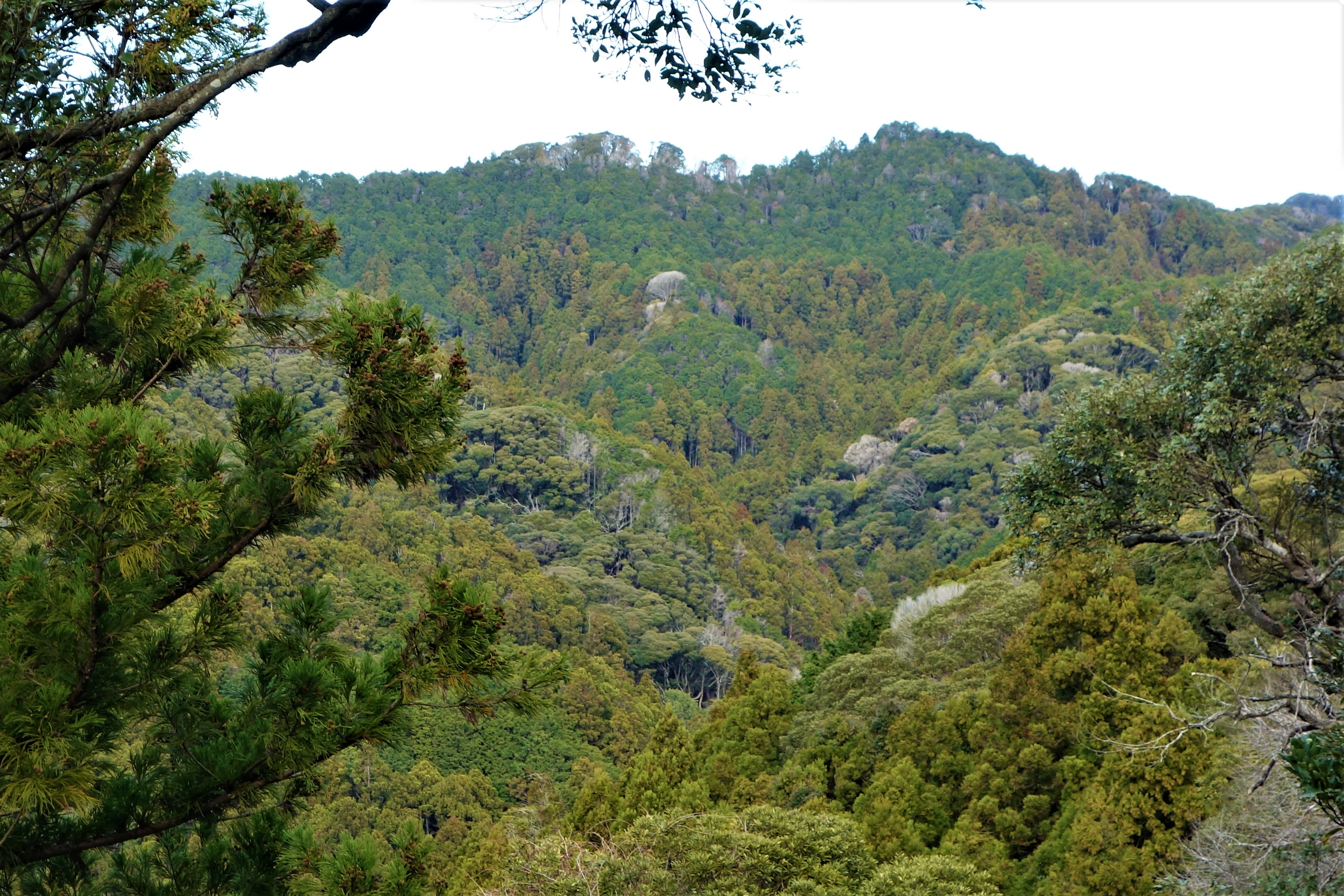

Highest point
- Elevation: 266.6 m (875 ft)
- Listing: Mountains of Japan
- Coordinates: 35°4′52″N 140°1′31″E

Naming
- Language of name: Japanese
- Pronunciation: [kaɾasɯbajama]

Geography
- Location within Chiba Prefecture Location within Japan
- Country: Japan
- Prefecture: Chiba
- Island: Honshu
- Parent range: Bōsō Hill Range

Climbing
- Easiest route: Hike

Mount Karasuba (烏場山, Karasuba-yama) is a mountain of modest height on the border of the cities Minamibōsō and Kamogawa in Chiba Prefecture, Japan, reaching an elevation of 266.6 m (875 ft). It is one of the mountains of the Mineoka Mountain District of the Bōsō Hill Range. The kanji for Mount Karasuba, 烏 and 場, mean 'crow' and 'place' respectively. The mountain became a popular hiking destination after the construction of a hiking trail in 1975. The trail features three viewing platforms that offer views of the Pacific Ocean, surrounding hills, and nearby cities.

Mount Karasuba is covered by a laurisilva forest, a type of laurel forest found in subtropical areas. It is home to many examples of the Japanese stone oak and the sudajii castanopsis, an evergreen beech tree. The area around the Odawara district of Minamibōsō is a base for floriculture, and there are many flower fields at the base of Mount Karasuba, even in winter.

== Transportation ==
The hiking trail that leads to Mount Karasuba is accessible from Wadaura Station in Minamibōsō via the JR East Uchibō Line, although the hike to the summit can take several hours.

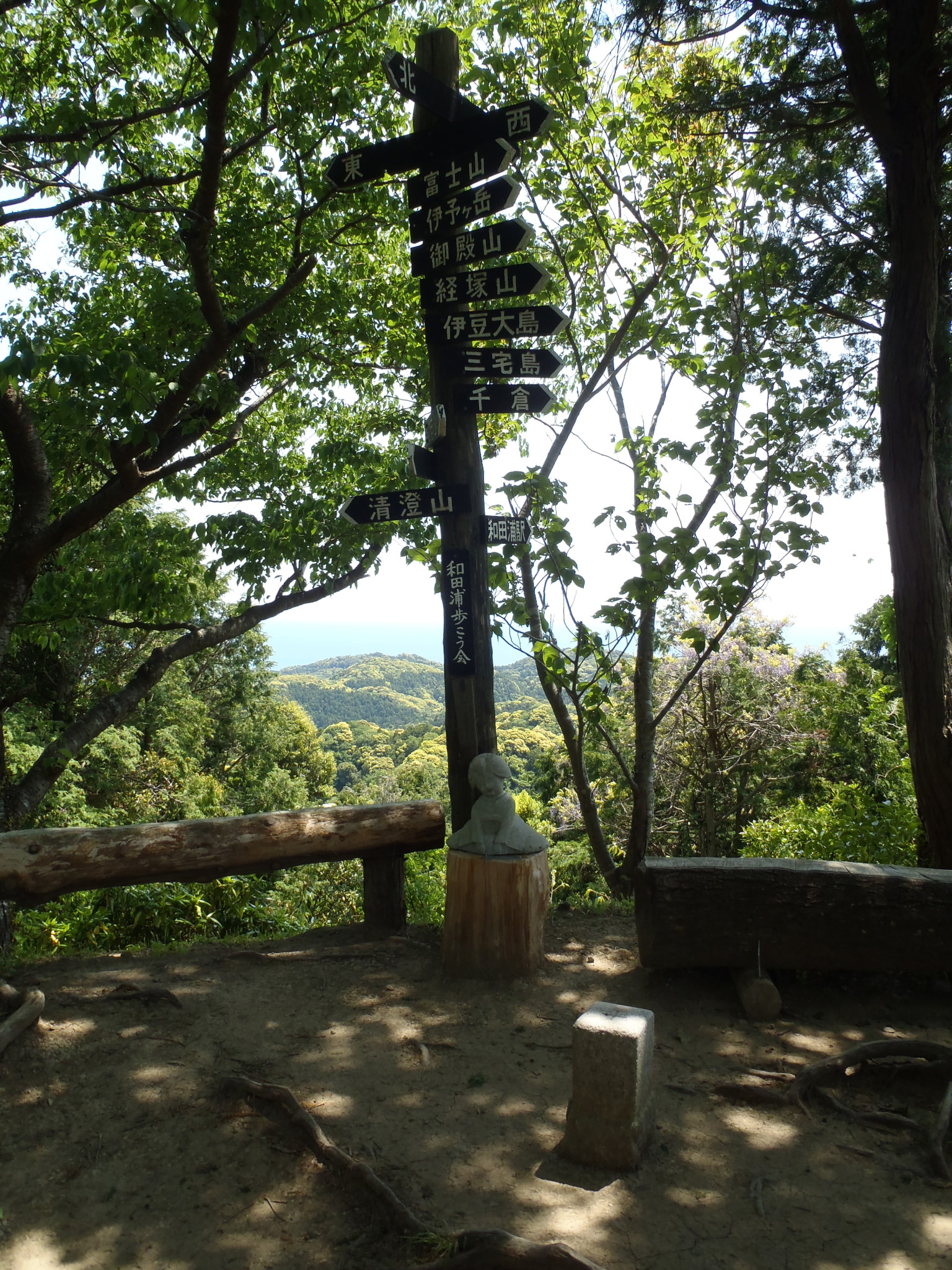
The top

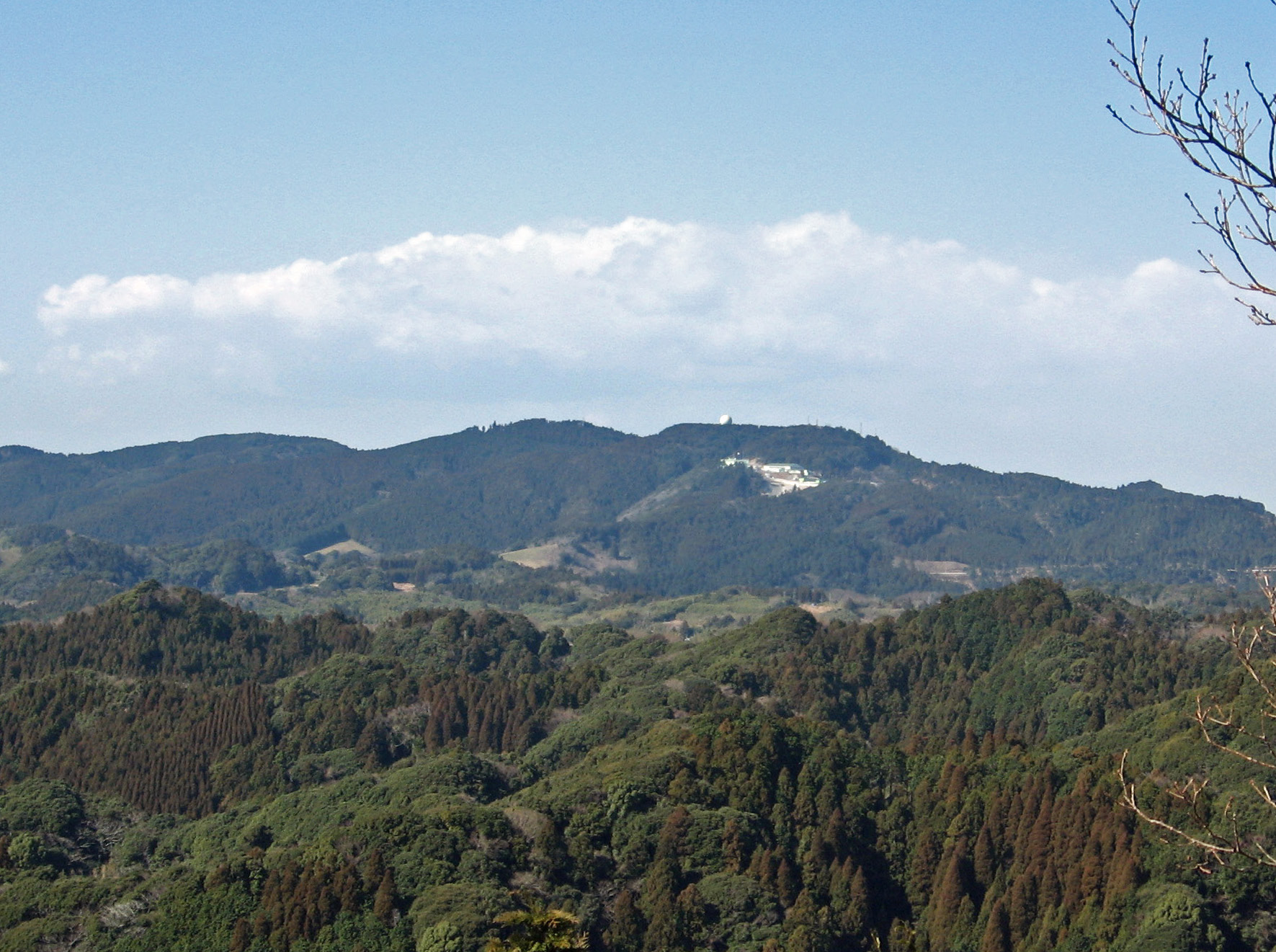
The NW view from third observatory. Mount Mineoka-Atago in the center.
