= Wadaura Station =

Railway station in Minamibōsō, Chiba Prefecture, Japan

Wadaura Station 和田浦駅
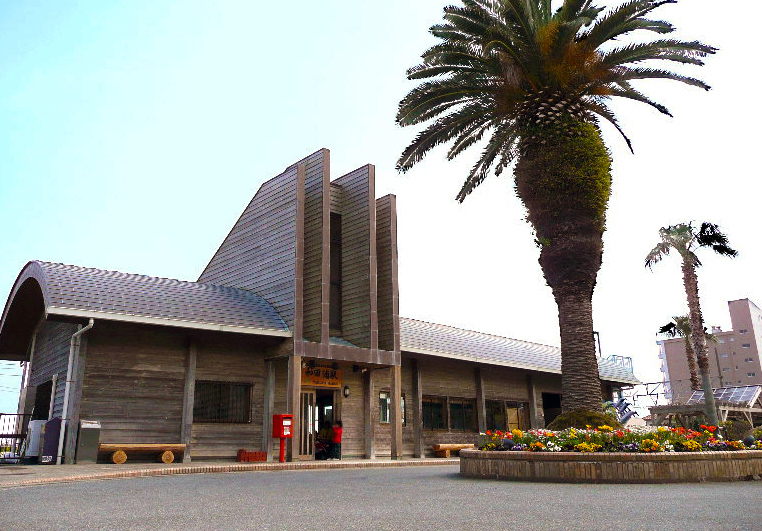
- Wadaura Station in April 2007

General information
- Location: Wadachō Nigaura, Minamibōsō-shi Chiba-ken 299-2703; Japan
- Coordinates: 35.0418°N 140.0197°E
- Operator: JR East
- Line: ■ Uchibō Line
- Distance: 106.8km from Soga
- Platforms: 2 side platforms

Other information
- Status: Unstaffed
- Website: Official website

History
- Opened: December 20, 1922

Passengers
- FY2015: 94

Services
Preceding station	JR East	Following station
Minamihara towards Soga or Chiba	Uchibō Line Local	Emi towards Awa-Kamogawa
Location
- Location within Chiba Prefecture Location within Japan

Wadaura Station (和田浦駅, Wadaura-eki) is a passenger railway station in the city of Minamibōsō, Chiba Prefecture, Japan, operated by the East Japan Railway Company (JR East).

== Lines ==
Wadaura Station is served by the Uchibō Line, and is located 106.8 km (66.4 mi) from the western terminus of the line at Soga Station.

== Station layout ==
The station is an at-grade station with two sets of rails running between two opposing side platforms connected by a footbridge. The station is unattended.

=== Platforms ===
1	■ Uchibō Line	for Tateyama, Kisarazu, and Chiba
2	■ Uchibō Line	for Awa-Kamogawa, Mobara, and Chiba

== History ==
Wadaura Station was opened on December 20, 1922. The station was absorbed into the JR East network upon the privatization of the Japan National Railways (JNR) on April 1, 1987. A whale-shaped station building was completed in 1995.

== Passenger statistics ==
In fiscal 2015, the station was used by an average of 94 passengers daily (boarding passengers only).

== Surrounding area ==
- Wadaura Seawater Bath
- Minamibōsō City Hall Wada Branch (Formerly the Wada Town Hall)
- National Route 126
- Hiking path to Mount Karasuba

== See also ==
- List of railway stations in Japan
