= Mount Iyogatake =

Mountain in Minamibōsō, Chiba Prefecture, Japan

- Iyogatake
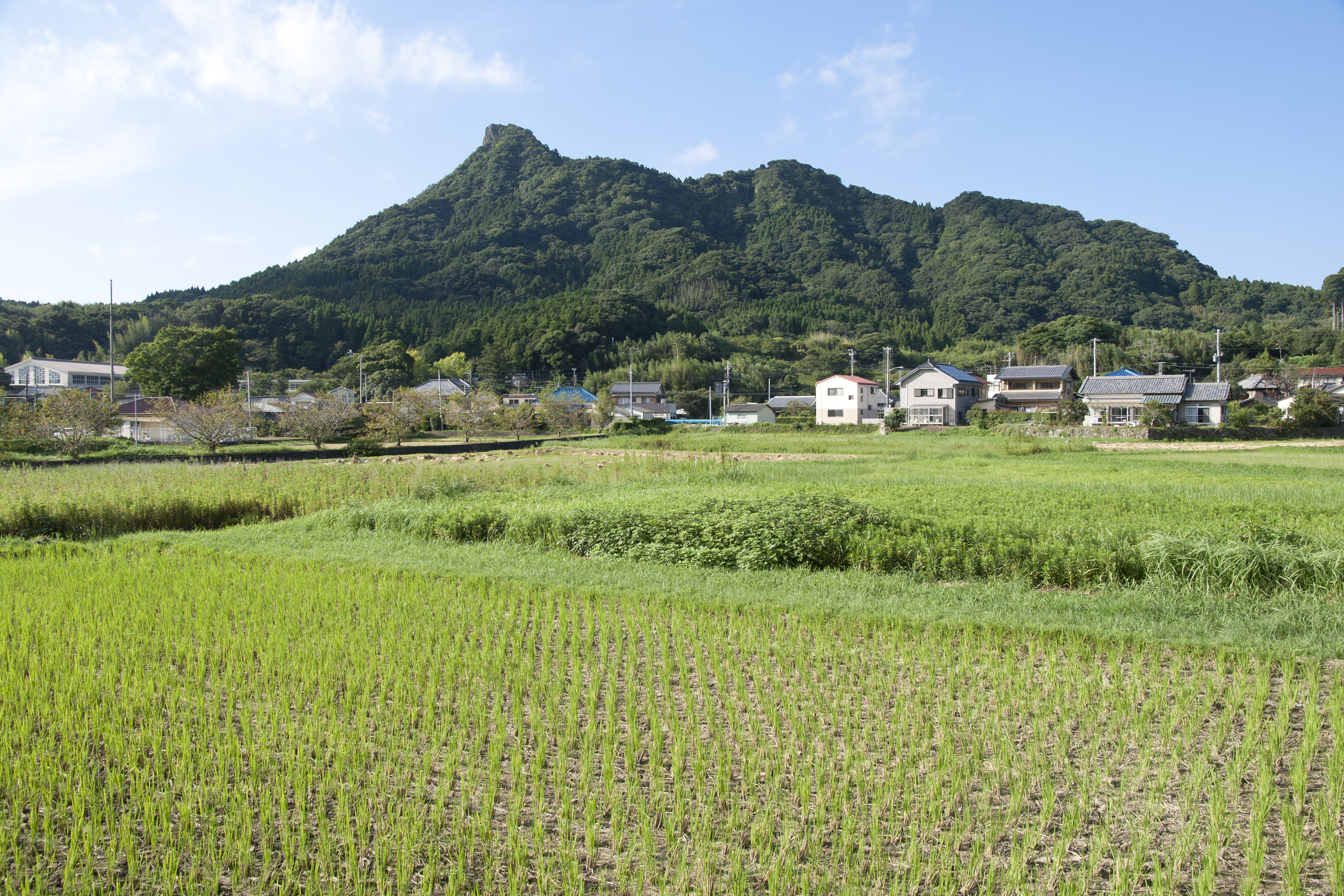
- View of southern slope of Mount Iyogatake, Minamibōsō, Chiba

Highest point
- Elevation: 336.6 m (1,104 ft)
- Coordinates: 35°6′26″N 139°54′50″E

Naming
- Language of name: Japanese
- Pronunciation: [ijoɡatake]

Geography
- Location within Japan
- Location: Chiba Prefecture, Honshu, Japan
- Parent range: Bōsō Hill Range

Climbing
- Easiest route: Hike

Mount Iyogatake (伊予ヶ岳, Iyoga-take) is a mountain on the border of the city of Minamibōsō, Chiba Prefecture, Japan with an altitude of 336.6 m (1,104 ft). Mount Iyogatake is on the western side of Mineoka Mountain District of the Bōsō Hill Range, near Mount Tomi. The mountain takes its name from its resemblance to Mount Ishizuchi in Ehime Prefecture, formerly in Iyo Province.

Mount Iyogatake is one of the few mountains in the Bōsō Hill Range with steep rock cliff. It can be easily climbed within 40 minutes. The entrance to the path of the mountain is between Heguri Elementary School and the Heguri Tenjin Shrine. Mount Iyogatake offers a clear view of the other mountains of the Bōsō Hill Range and Tokyo Bay, and on clear days Mount Fuji and the Izu Islands are also visible.

Mount Iyogatake and the Heguri Tenjin Shrine are associated with a legend of a tengu, a supernatural creature found in Japanese folklore.

== Transportation ==
The path to the peak of Mount Iyogatake is accessible by bus from the JR East Uchibō Line Iwai Station in Minamibōsō.

== Gallery ==
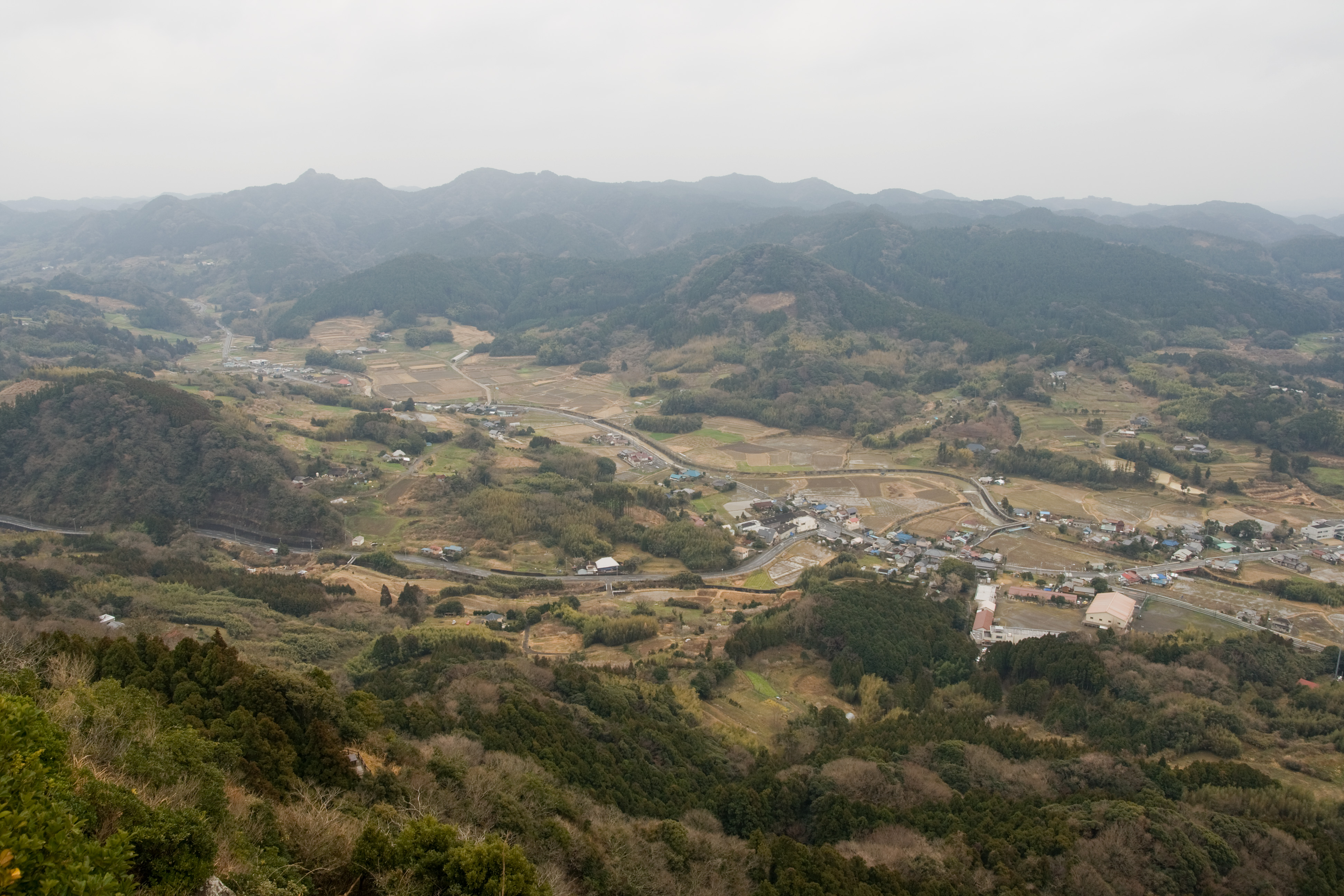
View of Mount Iyogatake

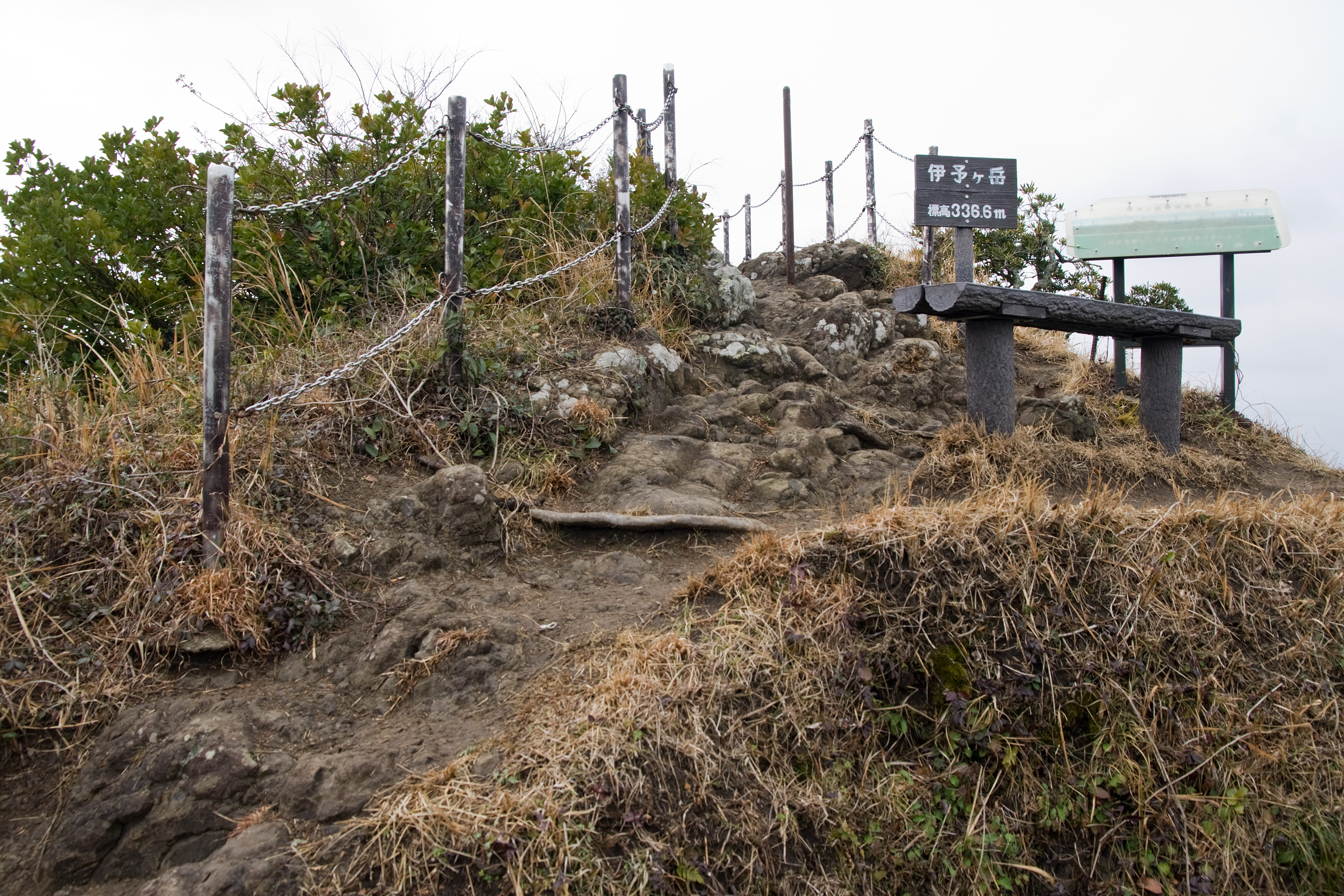
Summit of Mount Iyogatake

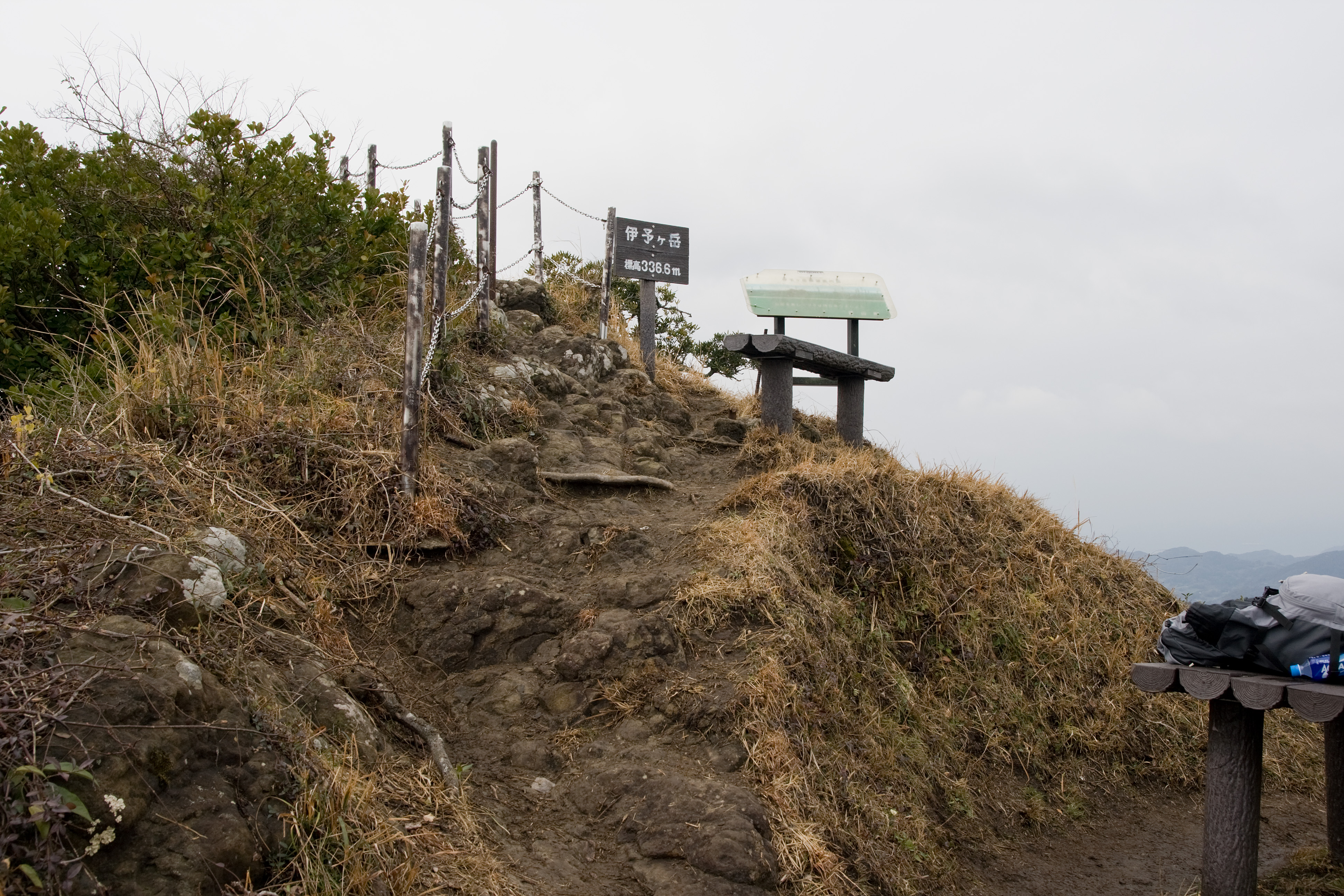
Summit of Mount Iyogatake
