= Cape Myōgane =

Cape in Chiba, Japan

Cape Myōgane 明鐘岬 Myōgane-misaki
- Cape
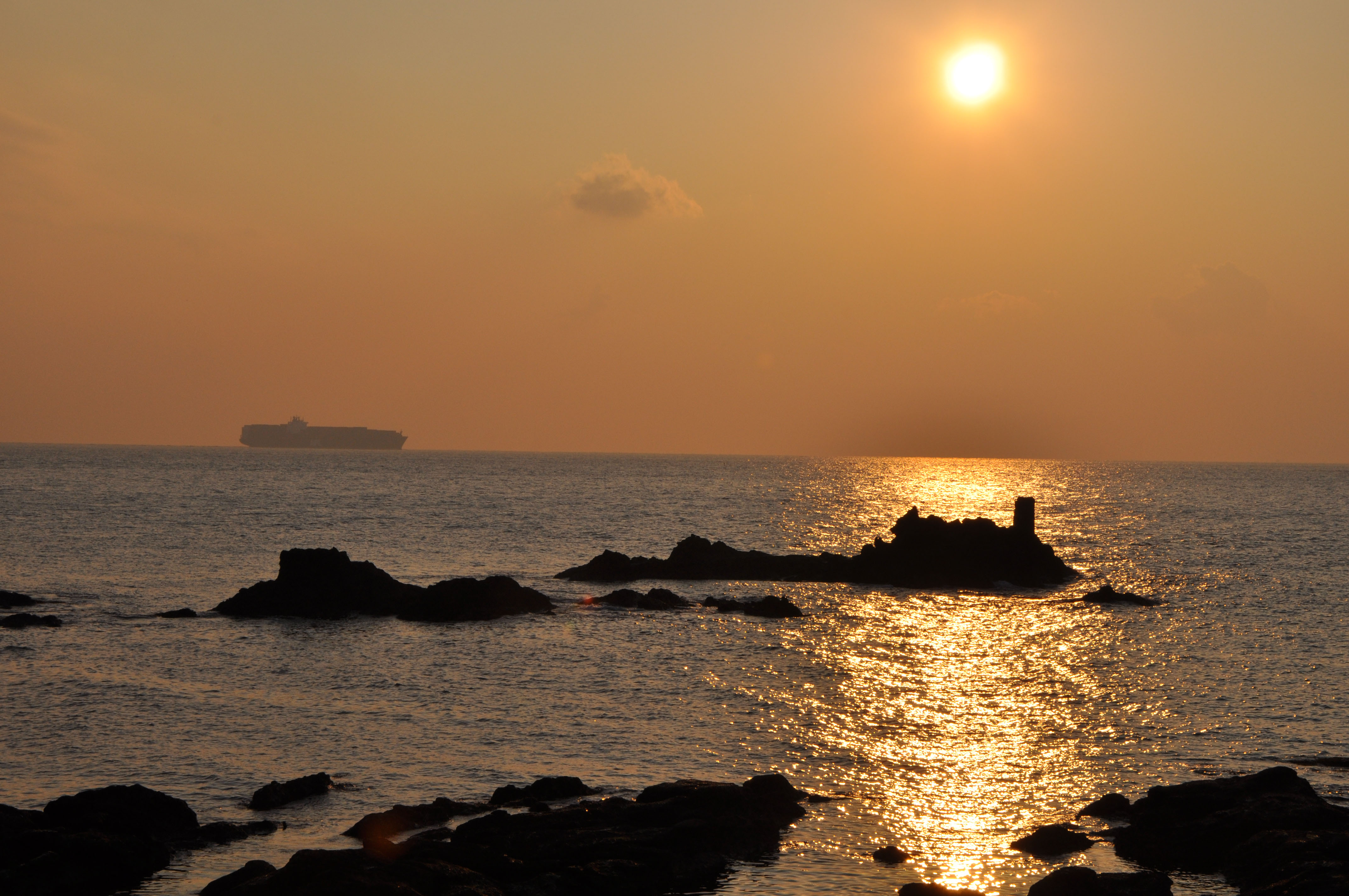
- Large ships can be seen from Cape Myōgane as they pass through the Uraga Channel on their way to and from Tokyo Bay

- Coordinates: 35°9′17.47″N 139°49′1.19″E
- Location: Kantō Region, Japan
- Offshore water bodies: Uraga Channel, Tokyo Bay

Cape Myōgane (明鐘岬, Myōgane-misaki) is a cape located on the border of Futtsu and Kyonan, Chiba, Japan, where Mount Nokogiri on its western end precipitously falls into the Uraga Channel to Tokyo Bay.

Cape Myōgane marked the eastern border between Awa Province and Kazusa Province in pre-modern Japan. The area surrounding the cape is mountainous and known from early times as an area difficult to traverse by land. Cape Myōgane, due to its strategic location over the Uraga Channel, was also a noted defensive position. By the Meiji period (1868–1912) one tunnel was constructed near the cape to allow easier passage in the area. A railroad tunnel was completed in 1917 under the area between Cape Myōgane and Mount Nokogiri. Now called the Nokogiriyama Tunnel, it spans 1.251 kilometres (0.777 mi) and allows the JR East Uchibō Line to connect Soga Station in Chiba City to cities in the south of the Bōsō Peninsula. Cape Myōgane, due to its strategic location over the Uraga Channel, was also a noted defensive position. Currently three tunnels (Motona, Shiofuki and Myōgane) allow safe passage by road via National Route 127.

Cape Myōgane is known as a particularly rich fishing area. At the beginning of the Edo period (1603–1868) the Tokugawa shogunate took direct control of the fisheries of the area at and around near Cape Myōgane, and designated Tateyama to the south as a market and shipping point for marine products to the Edo capitol. The cape continues to be a popular spot for amateur fishing.
