= Nihon-ji =

Buddhist temple in Chiba Prefecture, Japan

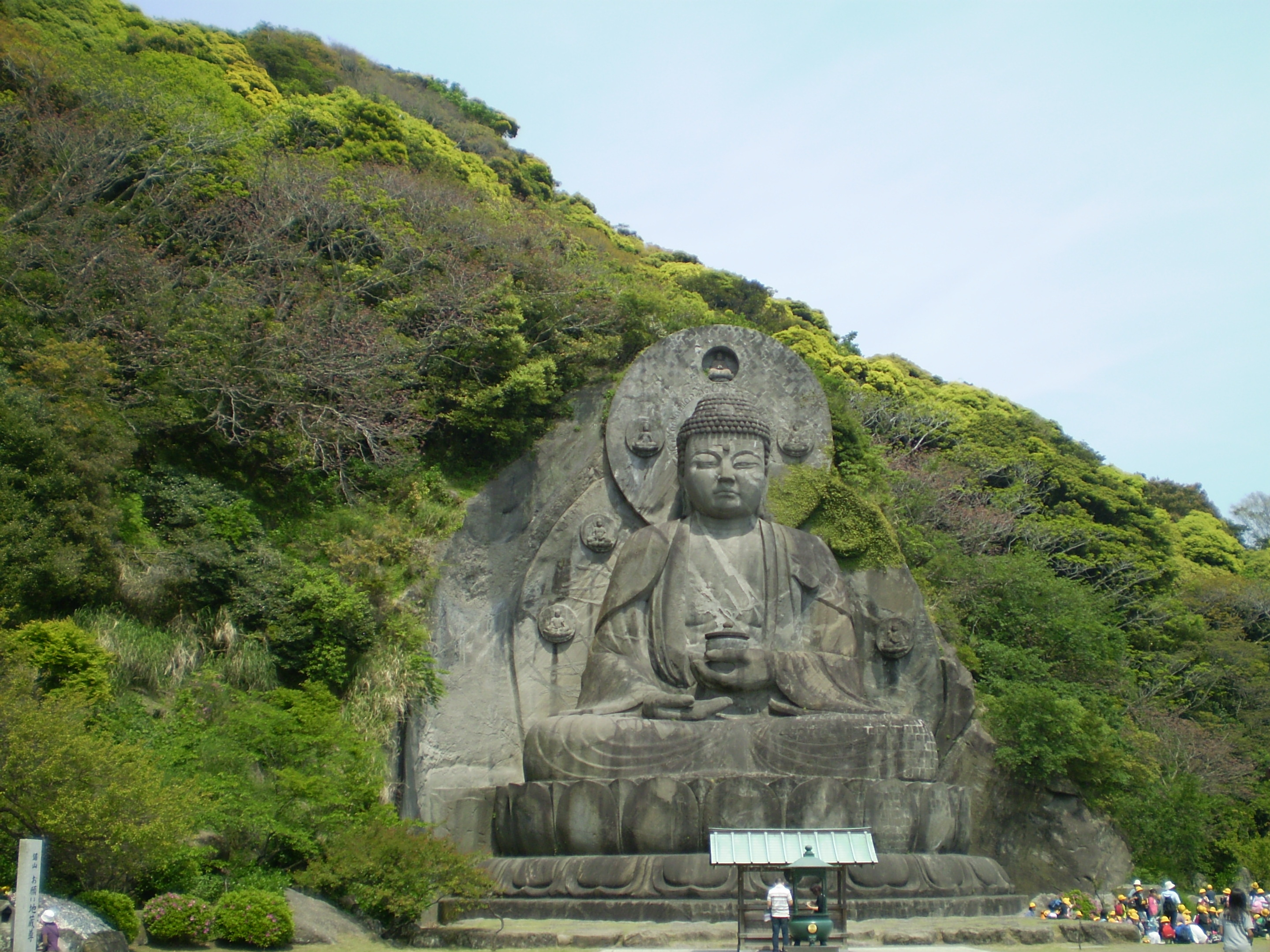
- Daibutsu of Nihon-ji

- Location within Japan

Religion
- Affiliation: Buddhism
- Sect: Sōtō Zen
- Deity: Shaka Nyorai

Location
- Location: Nokogiriyama, Kyonan, Chiba Prefecture
- Country: Japan
- Coordinates: 35°9′23.07″N 139°49′55.6″E

Architecture
- Founder: Emperor Shōmu
- Established: 725
- Completed: 2007 (reconstruction)

Website
- nihonji.jp

Nihon-ji (日本寺, Nihon-ji) is a Buddhist temple in the city of Kyonan, Chiba Prefecture, Japan. The temple is located on the slopes of Mount Nokogiri and is known for its Nihon-ji Daibutsu. Nihon-ji was established as a Hossō sect temple, was transferred to the Tendai sect, and is now a Sōtō Zen temple. Since its founding the temple has fallen into ruin and been revived numerous times.

== History ==
=== Founding ===
Nihon-ji was founded in the Nara period in 725 by order of Emperor Shōmu by the priest Gyōki (668–749). The temple is considered to be the Kantō region's sole Nara period chokugansho (勅願所), or temple built by order of the emperor. Nihon-ji was founded by Gyōki as a Hossō Sect temple. In this period the temple had seven great halls, twelve smaller halls, and was home to 100 monks. By tradition Nihon-ji was visited in the Nara period by Rōben (689–774), a monk of the Kegon sect and founder of the Tōdai-ji in Nara, and later by Kūkai (774–835), founder of the Shingon or "True Word" school of Buddhism. In 857, by opportunity of a visit to the temple by the monk Ennin (793 or 794–864), Nihon-ji was transferred to the Tendai school of Buddhism.

A few scenes of Nihon-ji Daibutsu

=== Revivals and transfer to Sōtō sect ===
Minamoto no Yoritomo was associated with the rebuilding of Nihon-ji. In 1181, he ordered the building of the jizō statue in the hōdō (法堂) lecture hall. In 1271, the area came under the control of the Nikaidō clan, and Nihon-ji is mentioned as Awa no Kuni Nihon-ji in the clan history. Nihon-ji was burned during a local conflict 1331 and many of the temple structures, including the dōu hall, were destroyed. Ashikaga Takauji (1305–1358), founder and first shōgun of the Ashikaga shogunate, rebuilt Nihon-ji. Takauji built the dōu (堂宇) eaved main hall in 1345, but during the Sengoku period the temple again fell into decline. In the Tenshō era (1573–1592) of the Momoyama period, Nihon-ji came under the protection of the powerful Satomi clan of Awa Province. During this period it became a subordinate temple of the Awa Seizen-in. In 1647, the temple was transferred to the Sōtō Zen sect, and Nihon-ji became a center of ascetic Zen practices. Nihon-ji came under the control of Enmei-ji, a temple in present-day Minamibōsō. During the Sengoku period the temple again fell into ruin.

=== Tokugawa period revival ===
In 1774, the priest Guden (愚伝), the 9th chief Hōsō priest of Nihon-ji, carried out a large-scale revival of the garan, or temple complex. In 1774, Guden relocated the dōu temple hall, as well as many other structures of the temple, to the southern side of the middle of Mount Nokogiri. This transformed Mount Nokogiri into a sacred mountain. The Nihon-ji Daibutsu was built in this period, as well as the 1,553 rakan Arhat stone statues.

=== Meiji-Period destruction and modern restoration ===
Nihon-ji suffered much destruction during the anti-Buddhist haibutsu kishaku movement (1868 – c.1874) after the Meiji Restoration. Buddhist property was destroyed on a large scale throughout Japan, and many of the structures of the temple complex at Nihon-ji were destroyed. Many of the Arhat statues were beheaded in this period. In 1916, a restoration of the temple complex of Nihon-ji began. A major earthquake in November 1939, however, again damaged the temple. The chief dōu hall, statues, and treasured Buddhist articles were lost in a fire that occurred due to the earthquake. In 1989, the government of India presented Nihon-ji with a sapling from the Bodhi tree as a gesture of world peace.

In 2007, another round of reconstruction efforts targeting the temple's structures was completed, rebuilding the Bhaisajyaguru Hall and several other buildings. In 2009, the original Main Hall of the temple was demolished and construction of a new Main Hall as well as surrounding facilities was started.

== Noted treasures ==
- Nihon-ji Daibutsu, 1783, 31 m (102 ft) high stone daibutsu sculpture of the Yakushiji Nyorai, the Buddha of healing
- Rakan Arhat sculptures, 1774, constructed by Ōno Jingorō
- Kannon Statue, 1966, 30.3 m (99 ft)
- Bonsō bell, 1321, designated as an Important Cultural Properties of Japan

== Transportation ==
Nihon-ji is accessible by foot from JR East's Uchibō Line Hamakanaya Station in Futtsu and Hota Station in Kyonan
