= Bōsō Hill Range =

Mountain range in the Bōsō peninsula

- Bōsō-kyūryō
- Sentinel image of Bōsō Hill Range from Space Shuttle

Highest point
- Elevation: 408.2 m (1,339 ft)
- Coordinates: 35.1147°N 139.9867°E

Naming
- Language of name: Japanese
- Pronunciation: [boːsoː kʲɯːɾʲoː]

Geography
- Location within Japan
- Location: Chiba Prefecture, Honshu, Japan

The Bōsō Hill Range (房総丘陵, Bōsō-kyūryō) is a mountain range on the Bōsō Peninsula of Chiba Prefecture, Japan. The highest point in the Bōsō Mountain Range is Mount Atago, with an altitude of 408.2 m (1,339 ft). The hill range runs from roughly in a line from Mobara or Ōamishirasato to Kisarazu, but is not formally defined. It is an important part of the Minami Bōsō Quasi-National Park.

== Geography ==
The Bōsō Hill Range is still extensively wooded. The area from the Yōrō Ravine to Mount Seichō is noted for its forests of live oak. The hill range also has noted forests of oaks, chestnut, Japanese cedar (Cryptomeria), and various species of evergreen. The hill area around Tateyama is noted for its forests of castanopsis trees, a genus of evergreens belonging to the beech family.

== History ==
=== Premodern history ===
The Bōsō Hill Range was settled from the earliest periods of Japanese history. The Yōrō Ravine in present-day Ōtaki, Chiba is home to Jōmon period remains. Kofun tumuli were built across the entire hill range in the Kofun period, but Futtsu and Ichihara have especially rich examples of tumuli. Under the Taika Reform of 645, during the Asuka period, the hill range became part of three provinces, Shimōsa Province to the north, Kazusa Province in the middle part of the range, and Awa Province to the south. The hill range is noted for its richness of castles built during the Sengoku period as part of medieval conflicts.

=== Modern history ===
The provinces endured until Chiba Prefecture was established at the end of the 19th century in the Meiji period. The Bōsō Hill Range provided a natural fortification against air attack of Tokyo during World War II, when the 252 Air Group of the Imperial Japanese Navy (IJN) built the Mobara Air Field in 1941 in Mobara. After the war land reform was carried out in the region. The eastern part of the hill range saw major economic development as part of the greater Metropolitan Tokyo region.

== Economy ==
The hill range was known for charcoal production in the past. The hill range is still home to many dairy farms. Numerous golf courses were developed in the hill region, and recreational facilities continue to be developed in the area. The hill range is popular as a hiking destination.

== Important mountains ==
Mountain	Japanese name	Altitude	Location
Mount Atago	愛宕山	408.2 m (1,339 ft)	Minamibōsō
Mount Seichō	清澄山	377 m (1,237 ft)	Kamogawa
Mount Iyogatake	伊予ヶ岳	337 m (1,106 ft)	Minamibōsō
Mount Tomi	富山	350 m (1,148 ft)	Minamibōsō
Mount Takagoya	高宕山	330 m (1,083 ft)	Kimitsu and Futtsu
Mount Nokogiri	鋸山	329 m (1,079 ft)	Kyonan and Futtsu, Chiba|Futtsu
Mount Saga	嵯峨山	315 m (1,033 ft)	Kyonan and Futtsu, Chiba|Futtsu
Mount Mitsuishi	三石山	282 m (925 ft)	Kimitsu
Mount Otozure	音信山	186 m (610 ft)	Ichihara
Mount Mifune	三舟山	138.7 m (455 ft)	Kimitsu and Futtsu, Chiba|Futtsu

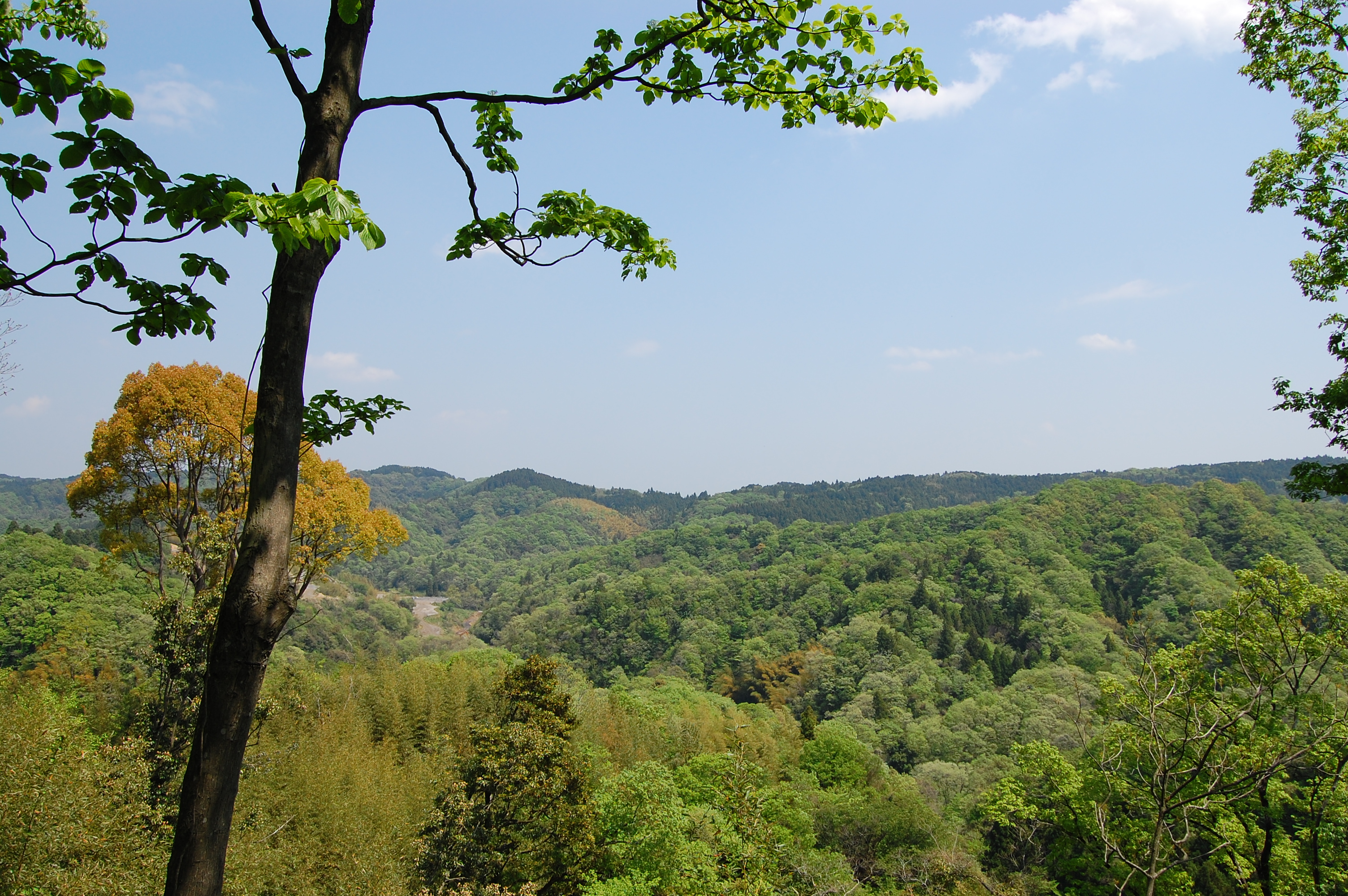
Bōsō Hill Range viewed from remains of Mariyatsu Castle, Kisarazu, Chiba

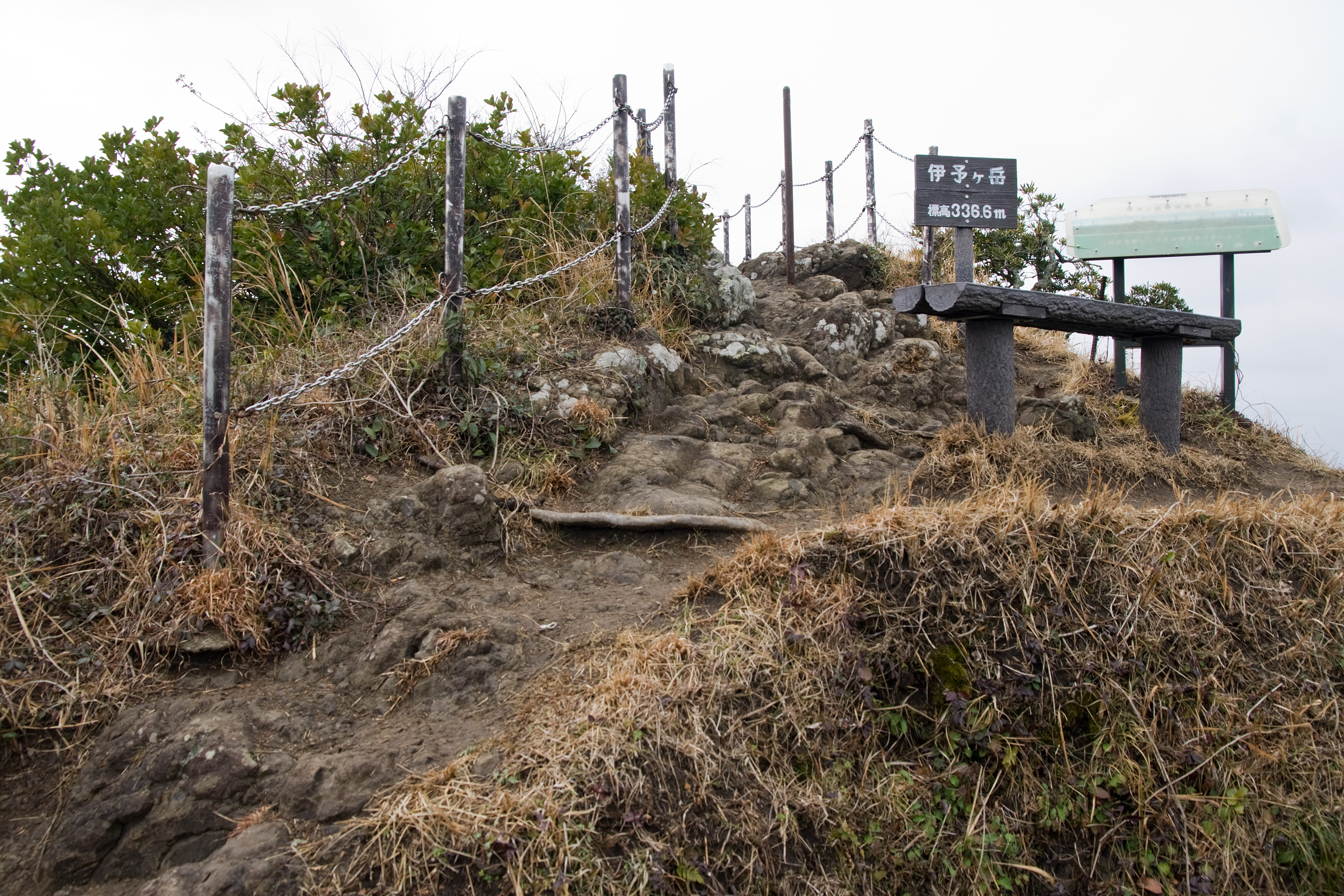
Summit of Mount Iyogatake, Minamibōsō, Chiba

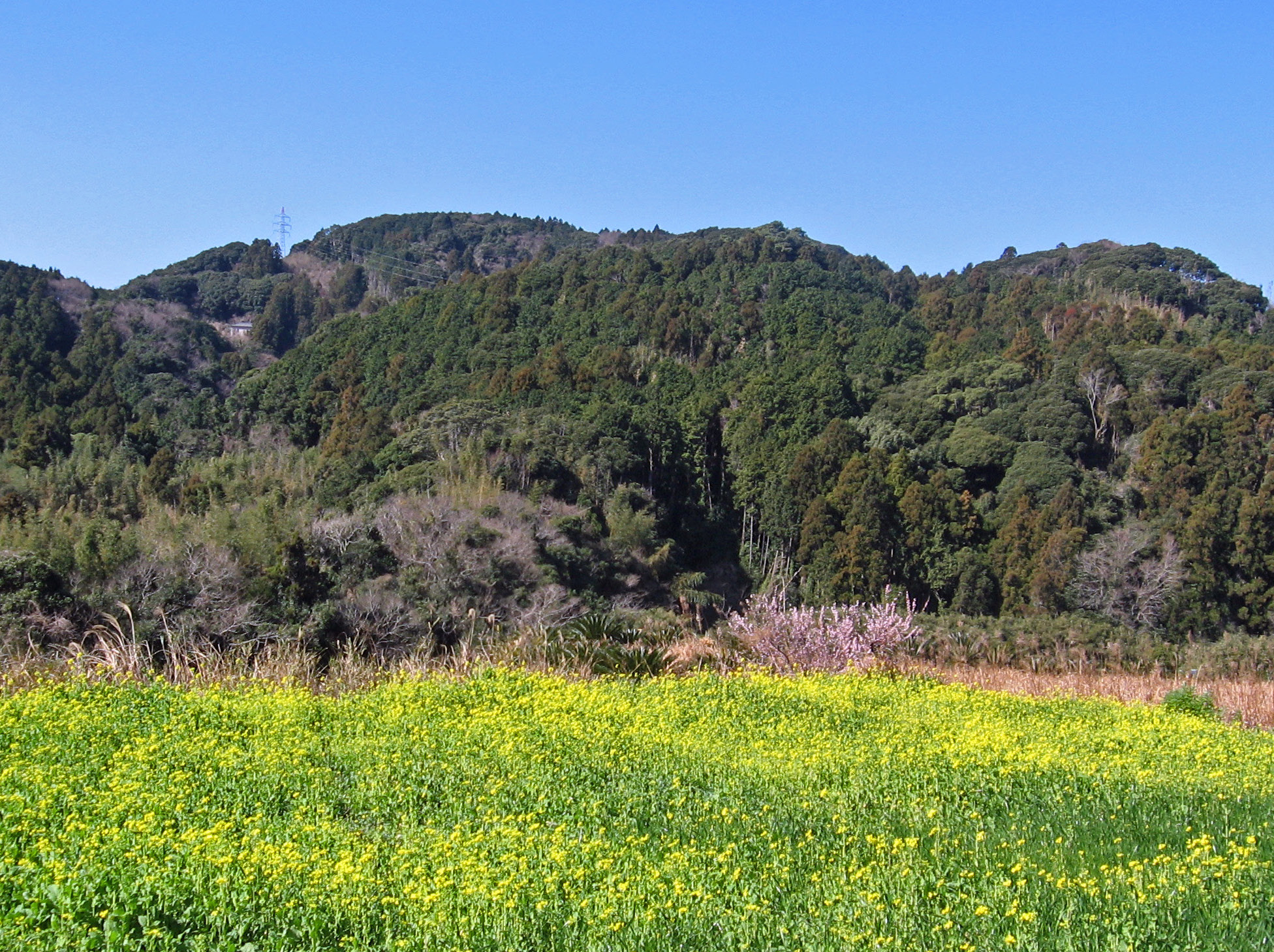
Mount Karasuba, Minamibōsō, Chiba

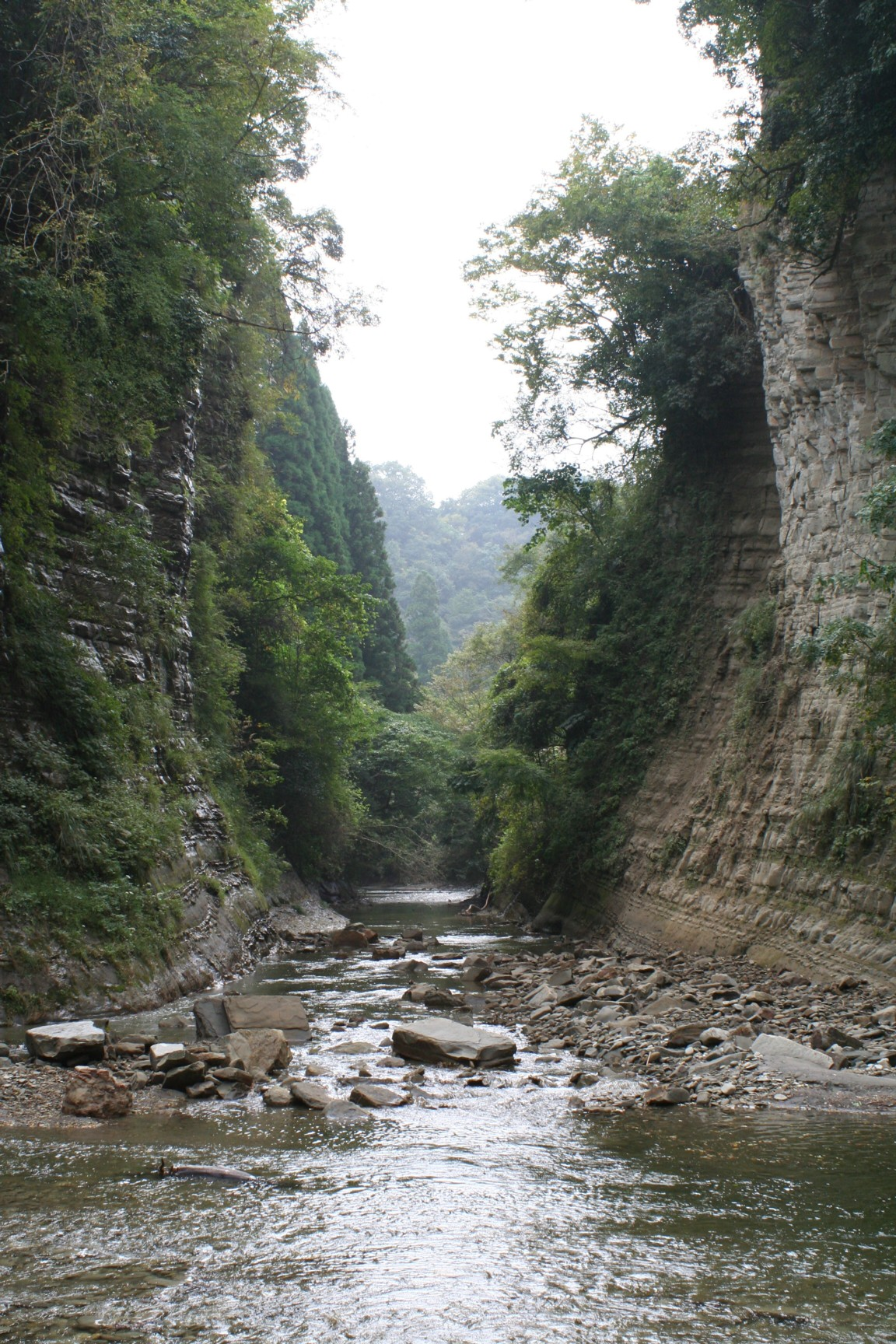
Yōrō Ravine in Ōtaki, Chiba
