= Bōsō Peninsula =

Peninsula encompassing most of Chiba Prefecture on Honshu

Coordinates: 35°20′19″N 140°08′50″E

- Peninsula
- Sentinel-2 image of Bōsō Peninsula

- Bōsō Peninsula (Japan)
- Location: Kantō Region, Chiba Prefecture, Japan

Area
  - Total: 5,034 km^{2} (1,944 sq mi)
- Highest elevation: 408.2 m (1,339 ft) (Mount Atago)
- River: Tone River, Edo River, Obitsu River, Yōrō River, Koito River

The Bōsō Peninsula (房総半島, Bōsō-hantō) is a peninsula that encompasses the entirety of Chiba Prefecture on Honshu, the largest island of Japan. It is part of the Greater Tokyo Area. It forms the eastern edge of Tokyo Bay, separating it from the Pacific Ocean. The peninsula covers approximately 5,034 square kilometres (1,944 mi^{2}).

== Description ==
The Bōsō Peninsula is defined by the Pacific Ocean to its east and south, Tokyo Bay to the west, and the Edo and Tone rivers to the north. The Bōsō Hill Range forms the backbone of the south of the peninsula, and much of the area is hilly. Mount Atago in Minamibōsō and Kamogawa is the highest point on the peninsula with an altitude of 408.2 m (1,339 ft). From south to north the Bōsō Hill Range gives way to the Shimōsa Plateau, which covers much of the area of northern Chiba Prefecture, and ends in the lower areas around the Tone River.

The northern and western parts of the Bōsō Peninsula are highly urbanized. The Shimōsa Plateau and the coastal lowlands and interior river valleys are chiefly used for rice cultivation. The western coast of the peninsula is home to the Keiyō Industrial Zone, which ranges from Urayasu on the border of Tokyo in the northwest of the peninsula to Futtsu to the south. The Tokyo Bay Aqua-Line, a bridge-tunnel across Tokyo Bay, connects Kisarazu with the city of Kawasaki in Kanagawa Prefecture. The northeast of the peninsula is home to Suigo-Tsukuba Quasi-National Park, which spans across both Ibaraki and Chiba prefectures, and much of the remainder of the eastern coast of the peninsula is designated as Minami Bōsō Quasi-National Park.

== Etymology ==
The peninsula gets its name and kanji from the former provinces that were located there: Awa (安房), Kazusa (上総) and Shimōsa (下総). The Japan Meteorological Agency refers to the west and east coasts of the peninsula as Uchibō (内房) and Sotobō (外房) respectively.
