= Hachiro Nitta =

Hachiro Nitta may refer to:

- Nitta Hachirō (1908–1989), Japanese singer
- Hachiro Nitta (politician) (born 1958), Japanese politician, Governor of Toyama Prefecture
