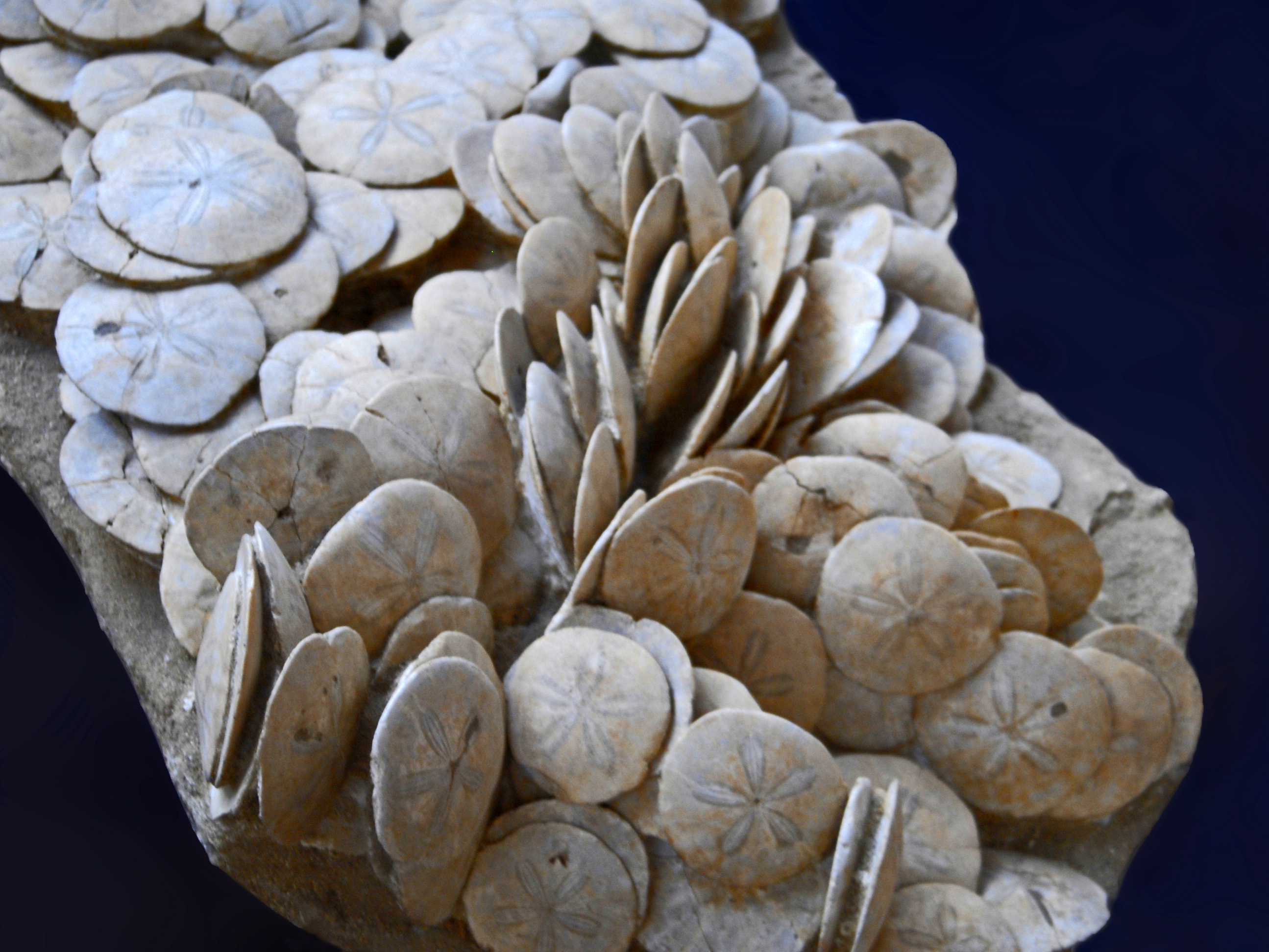
- Fossils of Scutella paulensis from France, on display at Galerie de paléontologie et d'anatomie comparée in Paris

Scientific classification
- Kingdom: Animalia
- Phylum: Echinodermata
- Class: Echinoidea
- Order: Echinolampadacea
- Infraorder: Scutelliformes
- Superfamily: Scutelloidea
- Family: Scutellidae; Gray, 1825

= Scutellidae =

Scutellidae Temporal range: Oligocene–Quaternary

Family of echinoderms

Scutellidae is a family of sea urchins in the superfamily Scutelloidea. All genera except Scaphechinus are extinct.

== Genera ==
As of 2017, the World Register of Marine Species recognizes the following seven genera in this family:

- †Allaster Nisiyama, 1968
- †Parascutella Durham, 1953
- †Remondella Durham, 1955
- †Samlandaster Lambert, in Lambert & Thiéry, 1914
- Scaphechinus A. Agassiz, 1864
- †Scutella Lamarck, 1816
- †Scutulum Tournouër, 1869
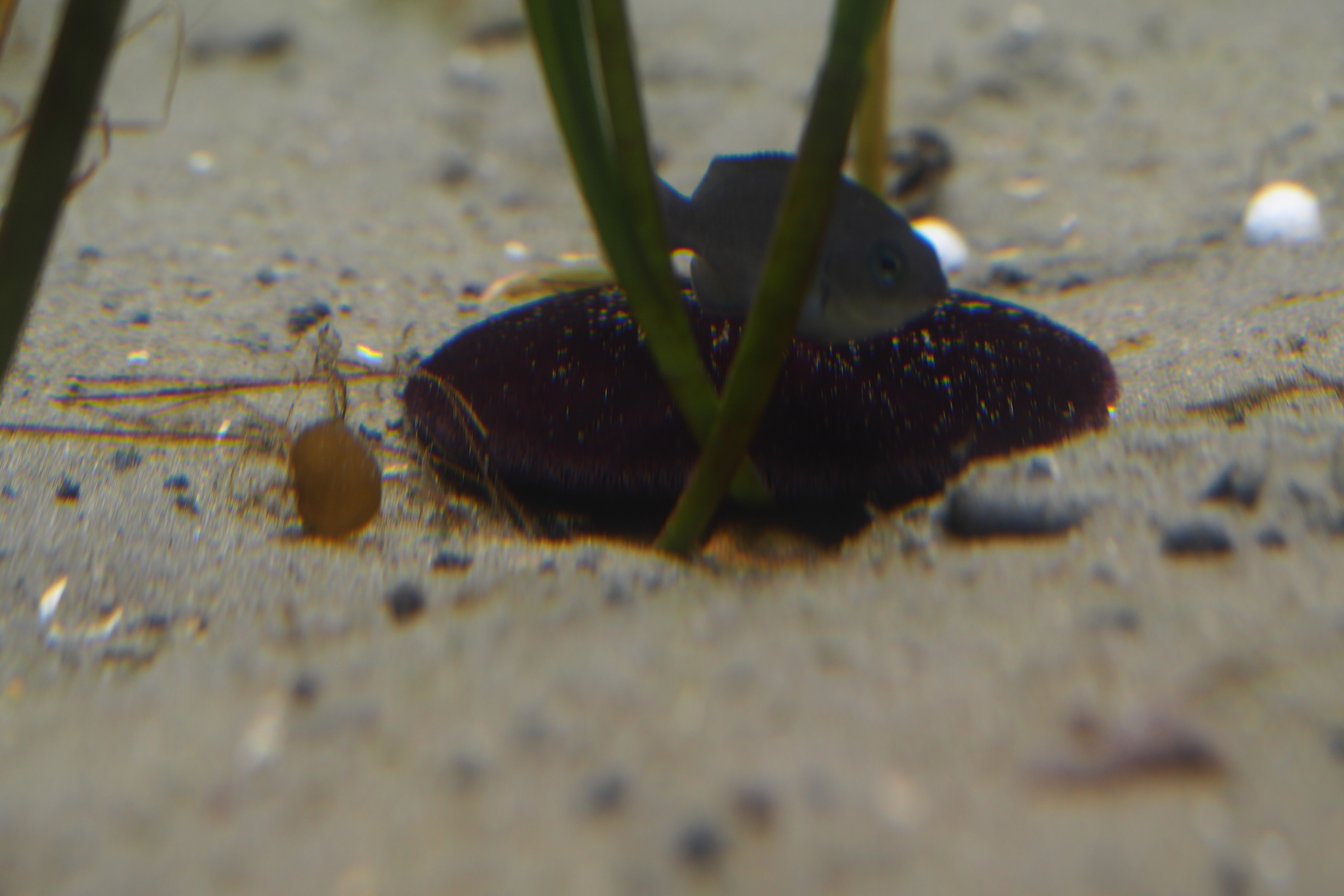
Scaphechinus mirabilis (Suma Aqualife Park, Kobe, Japan)

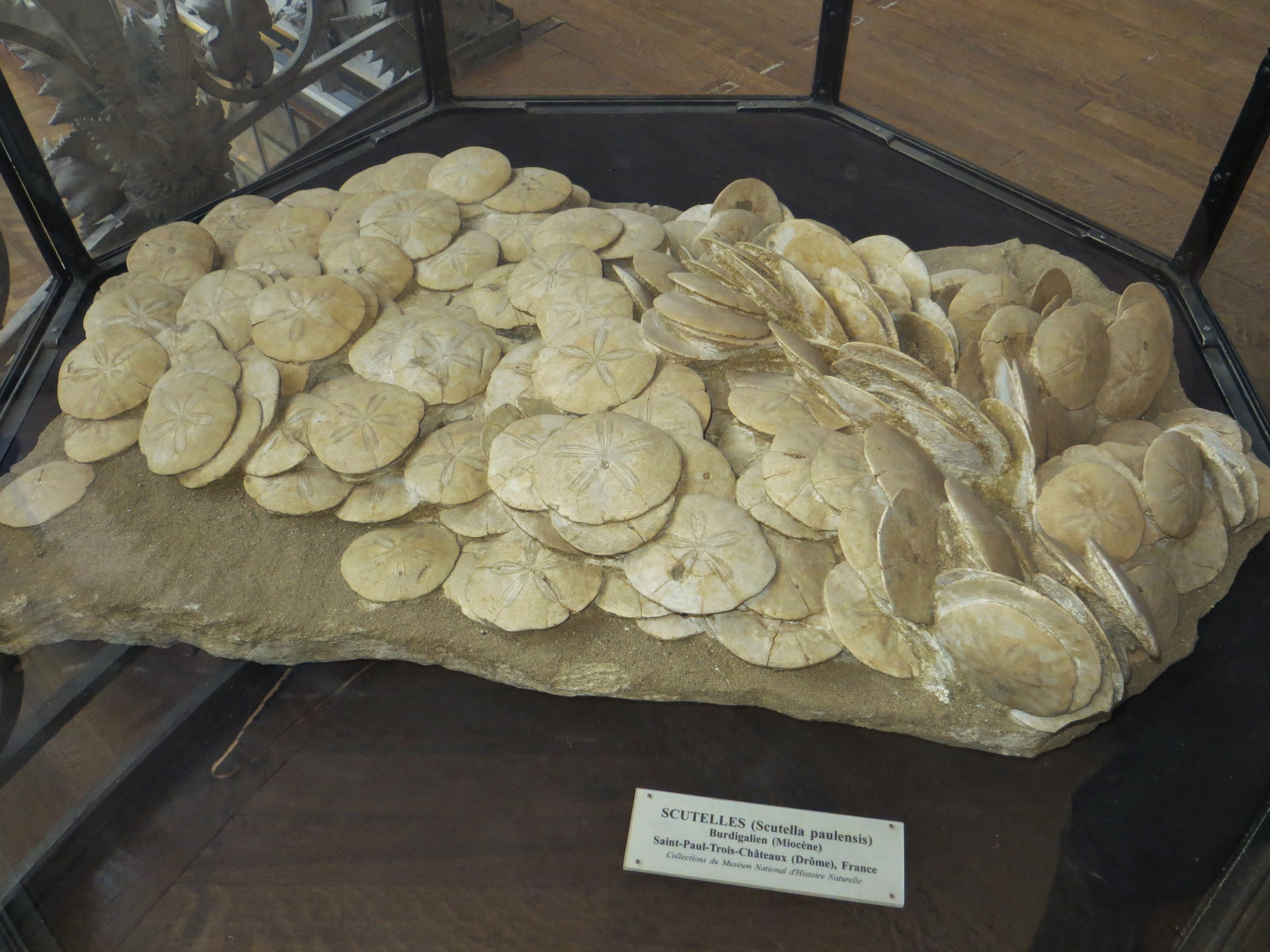
Scutella paulensis (MNHN)

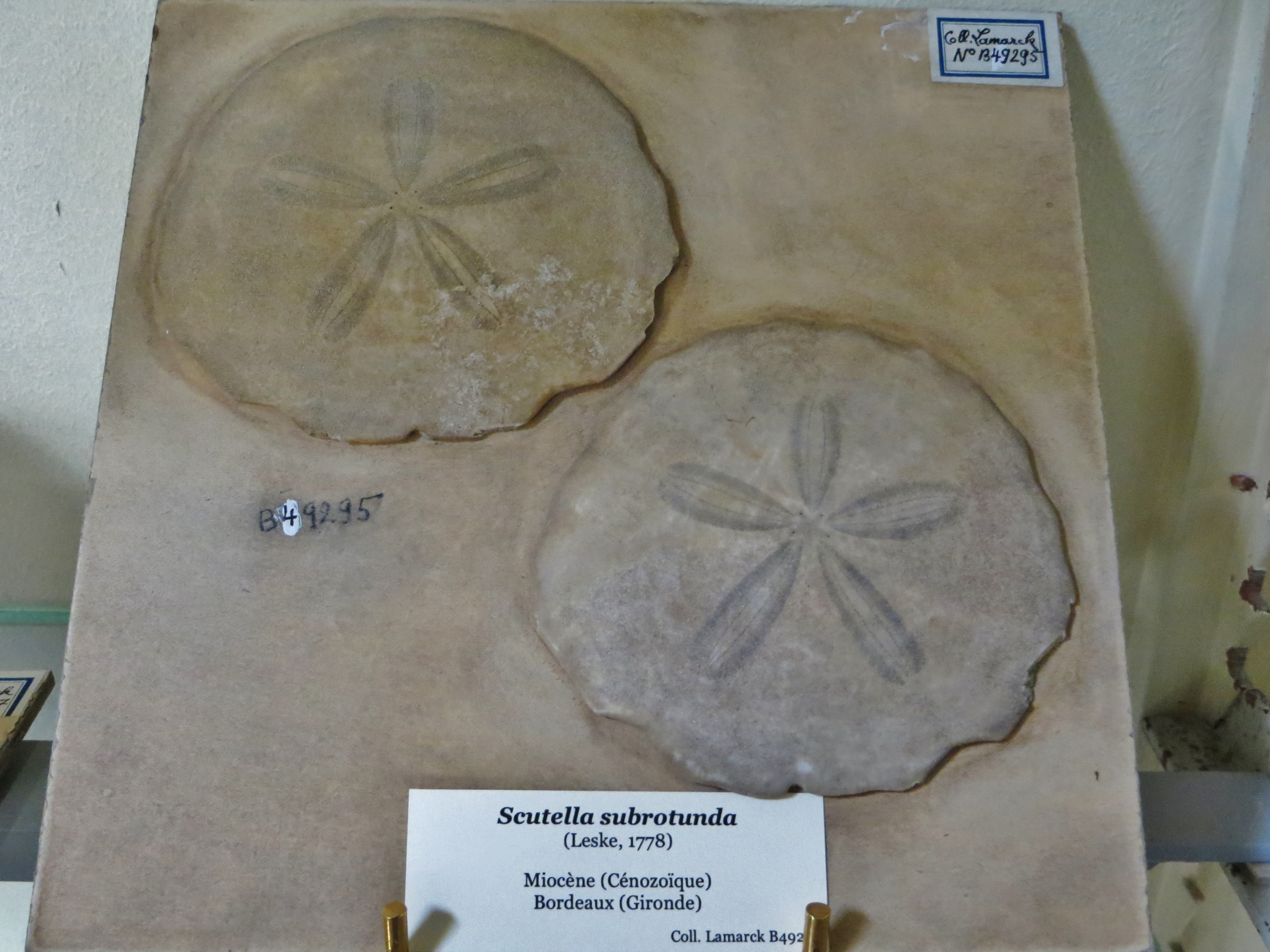
Scutella subrotunda (MNHN)
