= Seichō-ji =

Buddhist temple in Chiba Prefecture, Japan

- 清澄寺
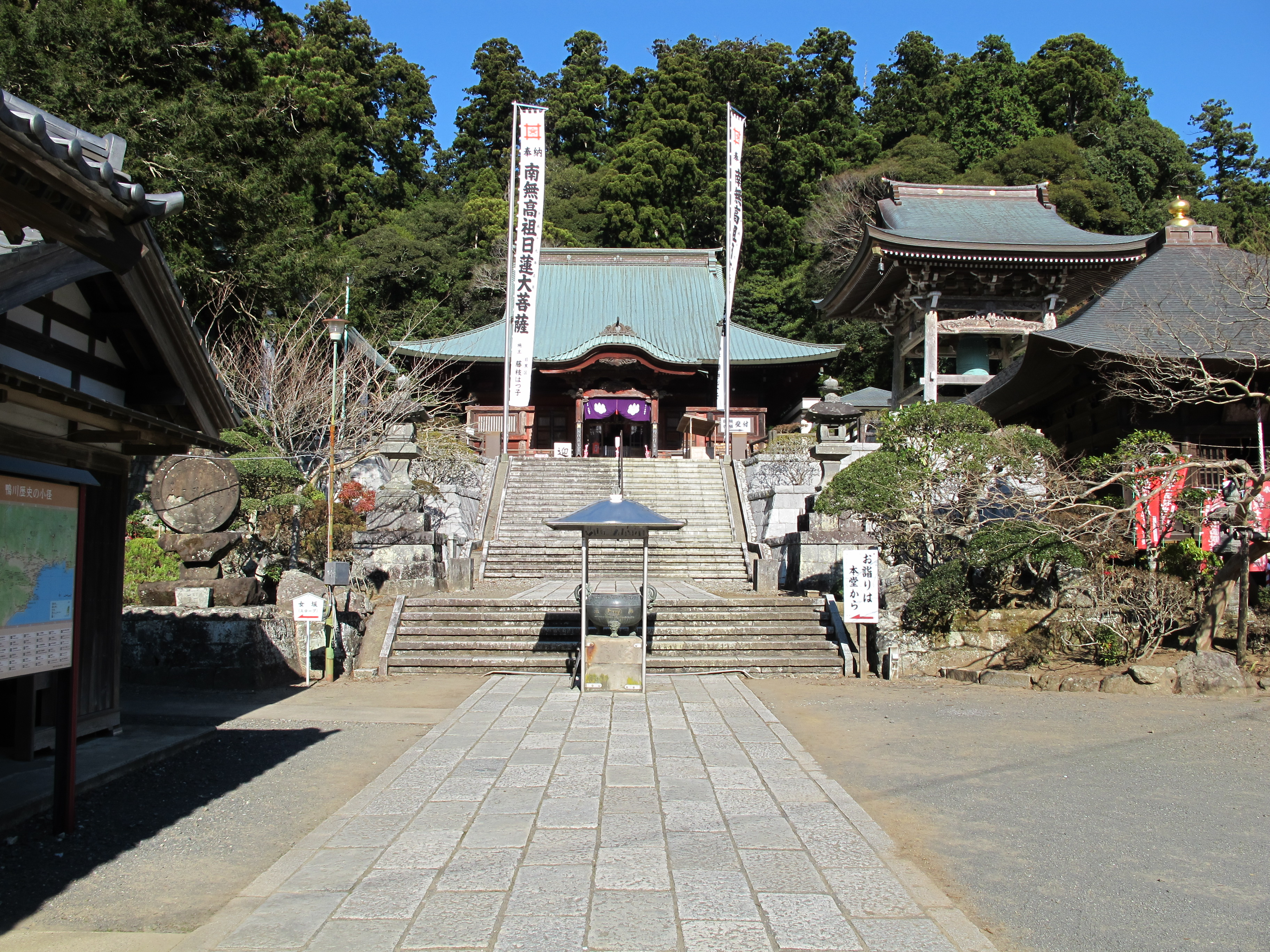
- Great Hall (大堂) of Seichō-ji

- Location within Chiba Prefecture Location within Japan

Religion
- Affiliation: Buddhism
- Deity: Great Mandala of the Ten Spiritual Realms
- Rite: Nichiren Shū

Location
- Location: Kamogawa, Chiba Prefecture
- Country: Japan
- Coordinates: 35°9′39.5″N 140°9′4.8″E

Architecture
- Completed: 771

Seichō-ji (Japanese: 清澄寺), also known as Kiyozumi-dera (清水寺), is a Nichiren Buddhist temple located in the city of Kamogawa in Chiba Prefecture, Japan. Along with Kuon-ji in Yamanashi Prefecture, Ikegami Honmon-ji in the south of Tokyo, and Tanjō-ji also in Kamogawa City, Seichō-ji is one of the "Four Sacred Places of Nichiren Shū."

The Buddhist priest Nichiren was once educated at the temple, and was chosen at one time to be a successor to its priesthood before he began his own ministry which later became Nichiren Buddhism. At the time, the temple was dedicated to the Pure Land sect, prior to being a Tendai temple, then later changed into Shingon, and now designated a Nichiren Shu temple.

== Location ==
Seichō-ji is located on Chiba Prefecture's second highest mountain, the 310-meter high Myōken-san. The temple grounds are within the borders of the Minami Bōsō Quasi-National Park. Myōken-san is the source of two of the Bōsō Peninsula's important rivers, the Yōrō River and the Obitsu River. The translation of the temple's name, meaning "clear, serene" probably originated in these natural features—Water running under the numerous daimyō oaks in the area.

The temple grounds contain the Great Kiyosumi Cypress, a protected natural National Treasure, known as a "thousand year cypress." Additionally, due to its altitude and scenic location, it is known as a prime tourist destination to watch the rising of the sun.

== History ==
=== Early history ===
The priest Fushigi visited the location in 771 AD to worship the Kokūzō Bosatsu, and the mountain became a spot for sangaku shinkō, a form of ancient mountain worship. Priest Ennin visited in 836 and Seichō-ji became a temple of the Tendai sect. The main hall was destroyed by fire caused by lightning in 1096, and was rebuilt by the Provincial Governor Minamoto Chikamoto. During the Kamakura period, Hōjō Masako established a two-story pagoda and a library containing over 4,000 sūtras in 1219.

=== Association with Nichiren ===
Shortly after, under the priest Dōzen, Nichiren entered the temple as a student in 1233 at the age of 11. He was formally ordained at 16 and took the Buddhist name Zeshō-bō Renchō, then left in 1253 to study in Kamakura and elsewhere. Because of its history, the temple is a daihonzan, or important religious center, of the Nichiren sect of Buddhism.

=== Later history ===
In 1618, Tokugawa Hidetada ordered that the temple convert to the Shingon sect to implement a government-sponsored Buddhist liturgy. In 1949, Seichō-ji was converted to a Nichiren temple.

== Important structures and cultural treasures ==
- Central Gate, 1647
- Remains of Asahimori sutra mound, 1276
- Stone treasure pagoda, 1407
- Inscribed hōkyō “stone flag” pagoda, 1424
- Temple bell, 1392
- Standing bronze Kannon statue
- Standing wooden Nyorai statue
