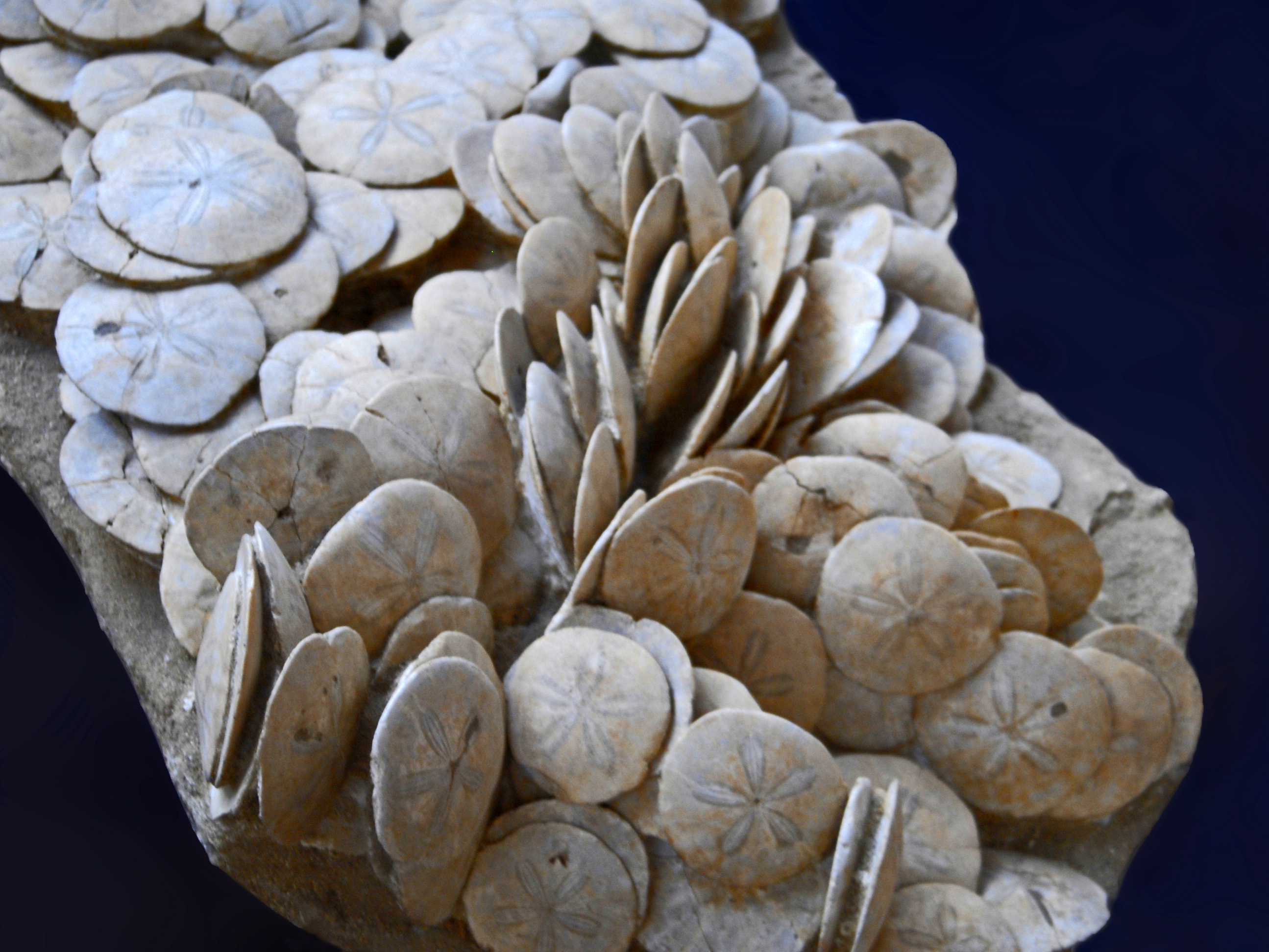
- Fossils of Scutella paulensis from France, on display at Galerie de paléontologie et d'anatomie comparée in Paris

Scientific classification
- Kingdom: Animalia
- Phylum: Echinodermata
- Class: Echinoidea
- Order: Echinolampadacea
- Family: Scutellidae
- Genus: †Scutella; Lamarck, 1816

= Scutella (echinoderm) =

Scutella Temporal range: Oligocene–Quaternary

Genus of echinoderms

Scutella is an extinct genus of sea urchins in the family Scutellidae.

These slow-moving semi-infaunal detritivores lived from the Oligocene to the Quaternary epoch (48.6 to 0.012 Ma).

== Species ==
- Scutella gabbi Raimond 1863
- Scutella paulensis Agassiz 1841
