= Shimaguchi Komao =

Japanese composer and writer (1911–1945)

Shimaguchi Komao 島口駒夫
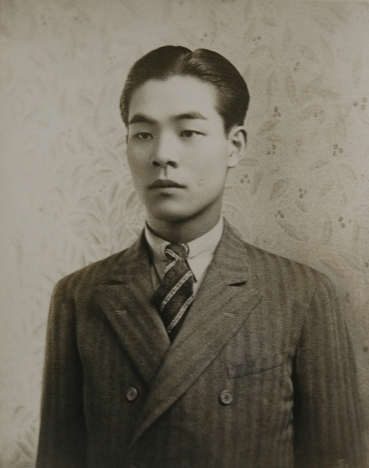
- Shimaguchi Komao during the early Shōwa era

Background information
- Born: April 10, 1911; Kaizuka, Chiba Prefecture, Empire of Japan
- Died: March 17, 1945 (aged 33) Iwo Jima, Empire of Japan
- Years active: early 1930s–1945

Shimaguchi Komao (Japanese: 島口駒夫); April 10, 1911 – March 17, 1945) was a Japanese composer of ryūkōka and gunka.

== Biography ==
Shimaguchi was born in 1911 in the village of Kaizuka (today part of the city of Kamogawa), Chiba Prefecture. He was the third son of a family who ran a fishery. Upon finishing elementary school, Shimaguchi moved to Tokyo where, with the assistance of an older brother, he enrolled at a music school.

During his professional career, Shimaguchi was signed exclusively to Nippon Victor, for whom he composed a number of songs which were popularized by the label's singers such as Fujiyama Ichirō, Haida Katsuhiko, and Nitta Hachirō. Shimaguchi also wrote a primer, Becoming a Popular Music Composer: Easy Methods to Write Popular Songs (流行作曲家になるには : 易しい流行歌の作曲の仕方, Ryūkō sakkyokka ni naruniha: Yasashī ryūkōka no sakkyoku no shikata), which was published by Shinkō Music Publishers in August 1938. His most famous song was "South Seas Voyage" (南洋航路, Nan'yō kōro), which was released in 1940. However, it gained wider popularity postwar as "Rabaul Ditty" (ラバウル小唄, Rabauru kouta), a renamed contrafactum devised by demobilized Japanese military personnel formerly deployed in the Nan'yō region.

After the start of the Pacific War, Shimaguchi was drafted by the Imperial Japanese Navy. He was first deployed to Tateyama Air Base, then later to Iwo Jima. Shimaguchi died on March 17, 1945, during the Battle of Iwo Jima. His remains were never found, but he left behind a pair of incomplete songs, including "Farewell, Wife and Children" (さらば妻子よ, Saraba saishi yo).
