= Tanjō-ji =

Buddhist temple in Chiba Prefecture, Japan

- 誕生寺
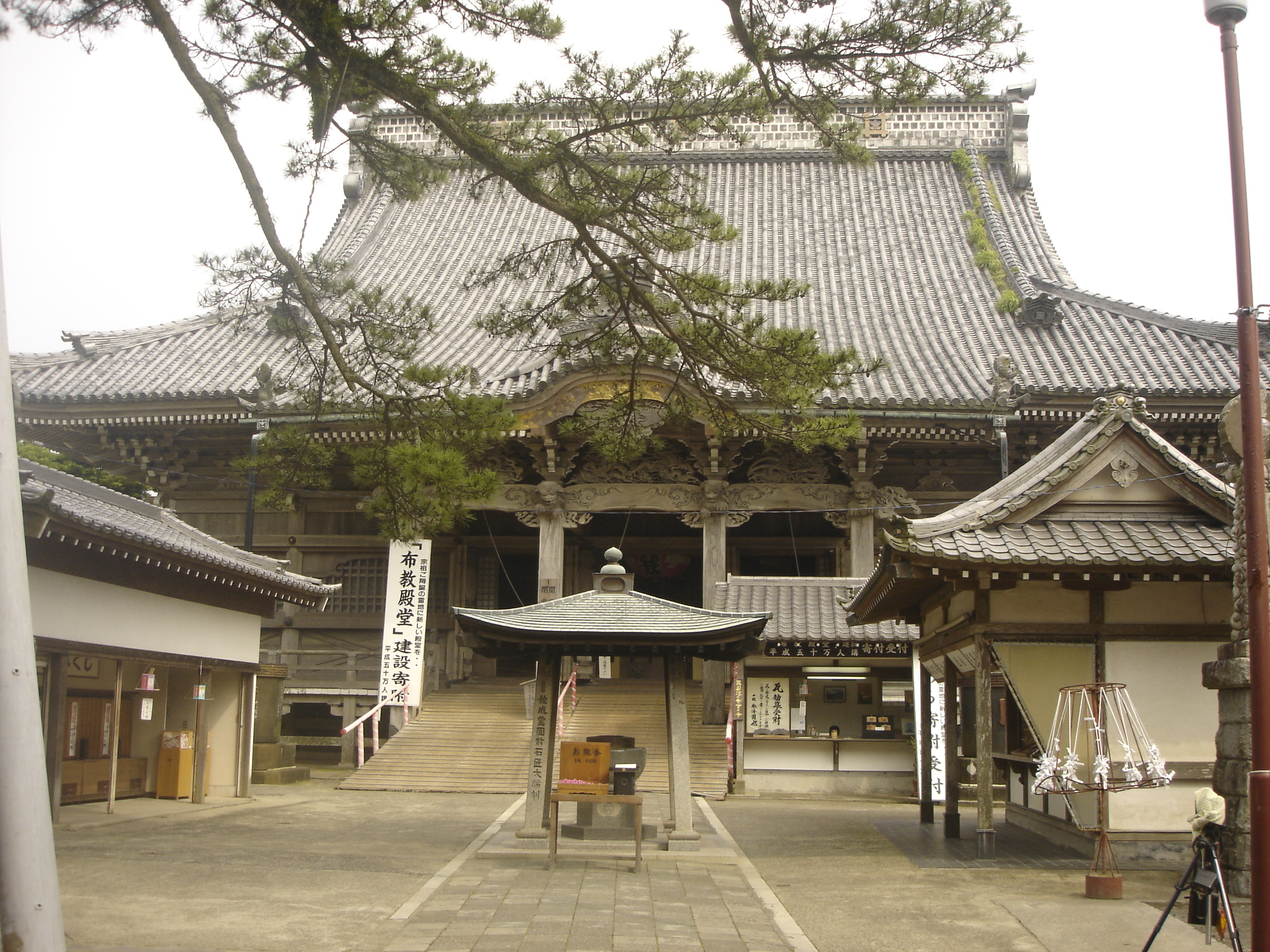
- Soshi-dō of Tanjō-ji

- Location within Chiba Prefecture Location within Japan

Religion
- Affiliation: Buddhist
- Deity: Great Mandala of the Ten Spiritual Realms
- Rite: Nichiren Buddhism

Location
- Location: Kominato 183, Kamogawa, Chiba Prefecture
- Country: Japan
- Interactive map of Tanjō-ji
- Coordinates: 35°7′2.76″N 140°11′54.07″E

Architecture
- Completed: 1276

Website
- http://www.tanjoh-ji.jp/e_index.html

Tanjō-ji (誕生寺) is a Buddhist temple of the Nichiren Shū located in the city of Kamogawa in Chiba Prefecture, Japan. Along with Kuon-ji in Yamanashi Prefecture, Ikegami Honmon-ji in the south of Tokyo, and Seichō-ji also in Kamogawa City, Tanjōji is one of the "Four Sacred Places of Nichiren Shū."

== History ==
A temple was founded on the location of Nichiren's birthplace in October 1276 by one of his disciples, Nichike. However, this early temple was destroyed by an earthquake in 1498, and again by an earthquake and tsunami in 1703, and was subsequently relocated further inland. The original site is now located offshore due to land subsidence. The temple underwent an expansion and reconstruction in the early 1700s under the sponsorship of Tokugawa Mitsukuni. However, with the exception of the Niōmon, all structures in the temple burned down in a fire in 1758. The temple has slowly reconstructed since that time, and has added numerous structures in the late 20th century through the efforts of a vigorous lay organization.

== Important structures and cultural treasures ==
- Niōmon, 1703, Tangible Cultural Property of Chiba Prefecture
- Main Hall, 1991
- Soshi-dō, 1842
- Honshi-den Hoto Pagoda, 1988
- Treasury, 1989
- Kyakuden, 1933
- Seven mandalas inscribed by Nichiren (Kamakura period)

== Gallery ==
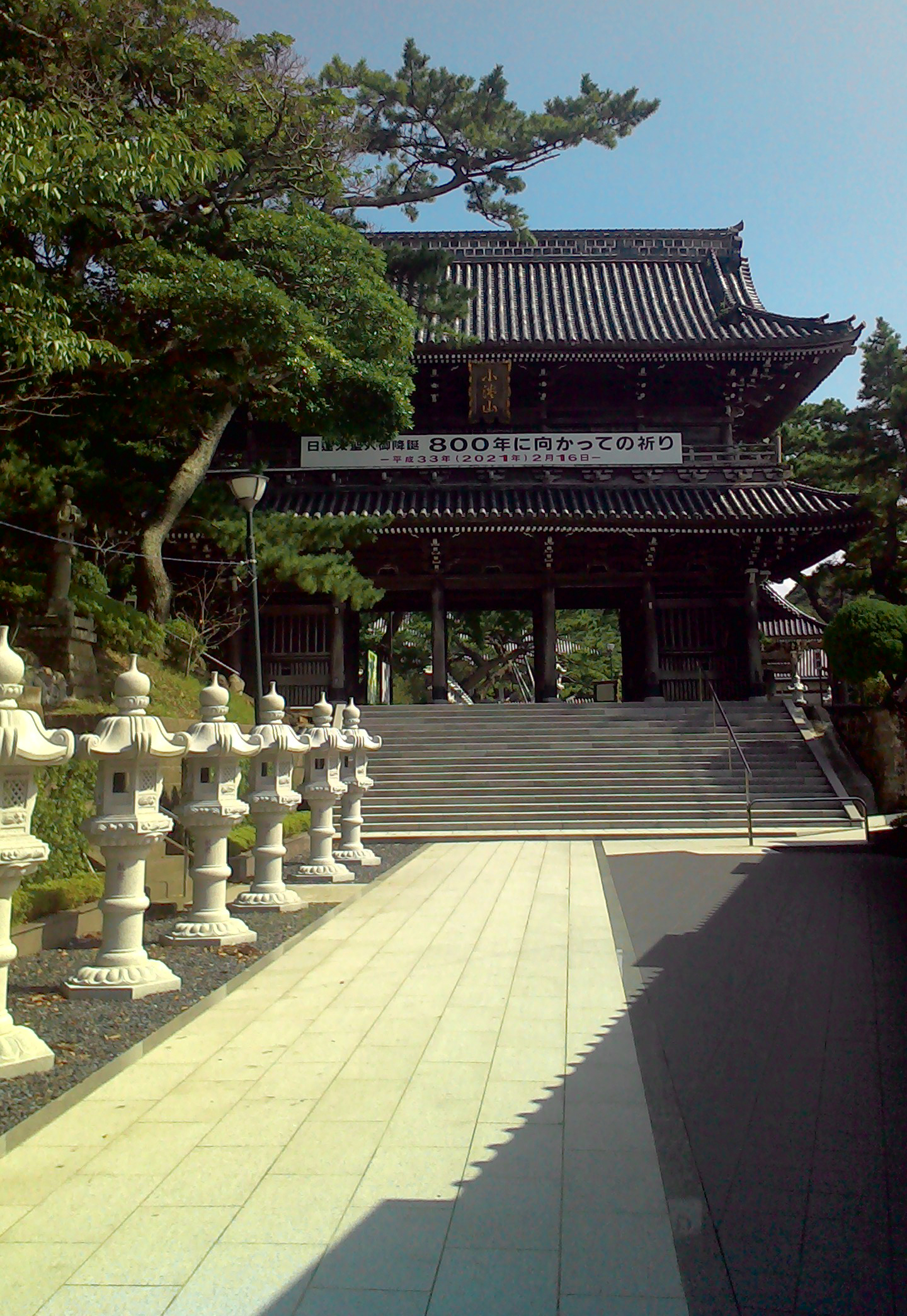
Niōmon

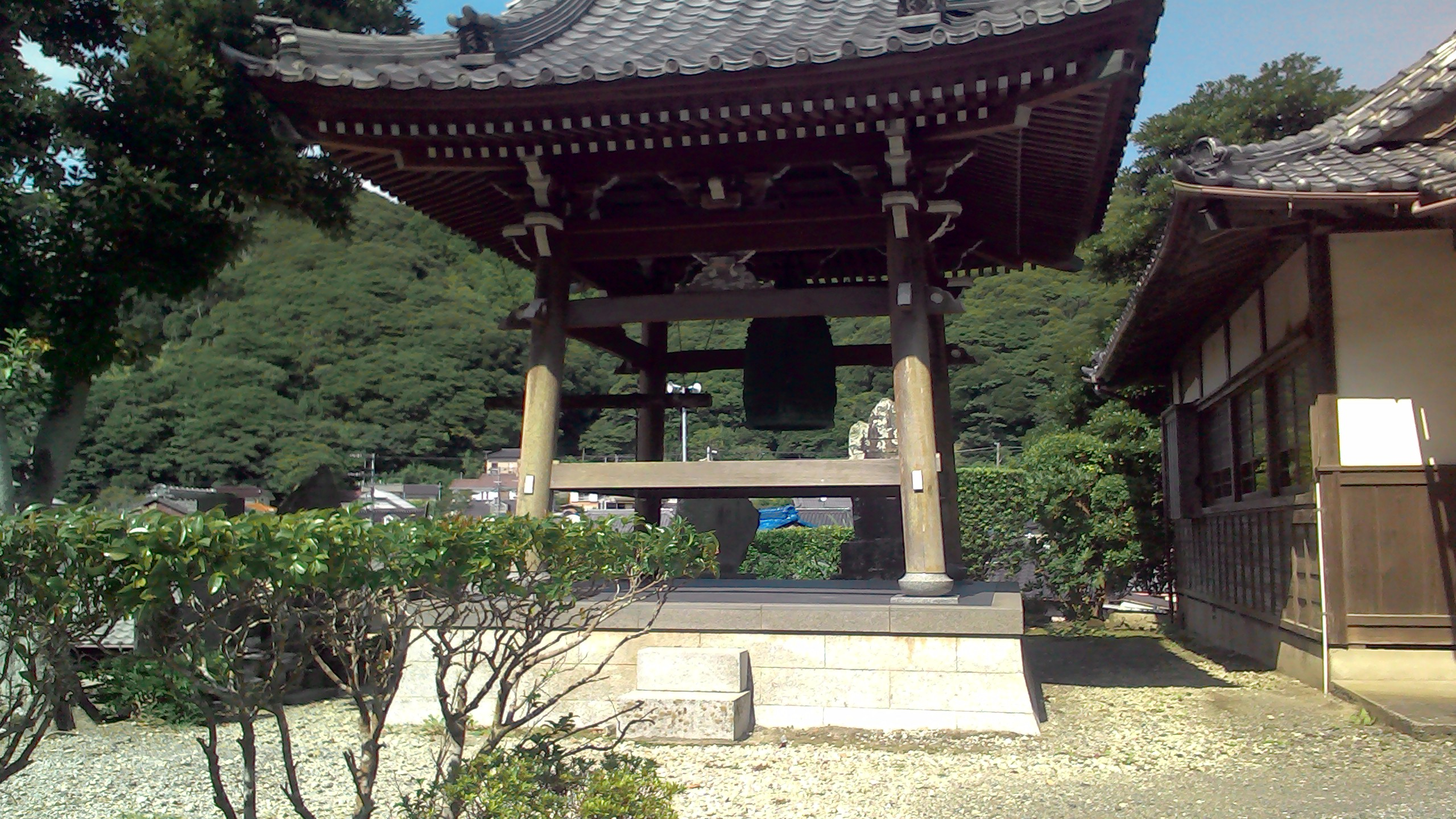
Tanjō-ji bell

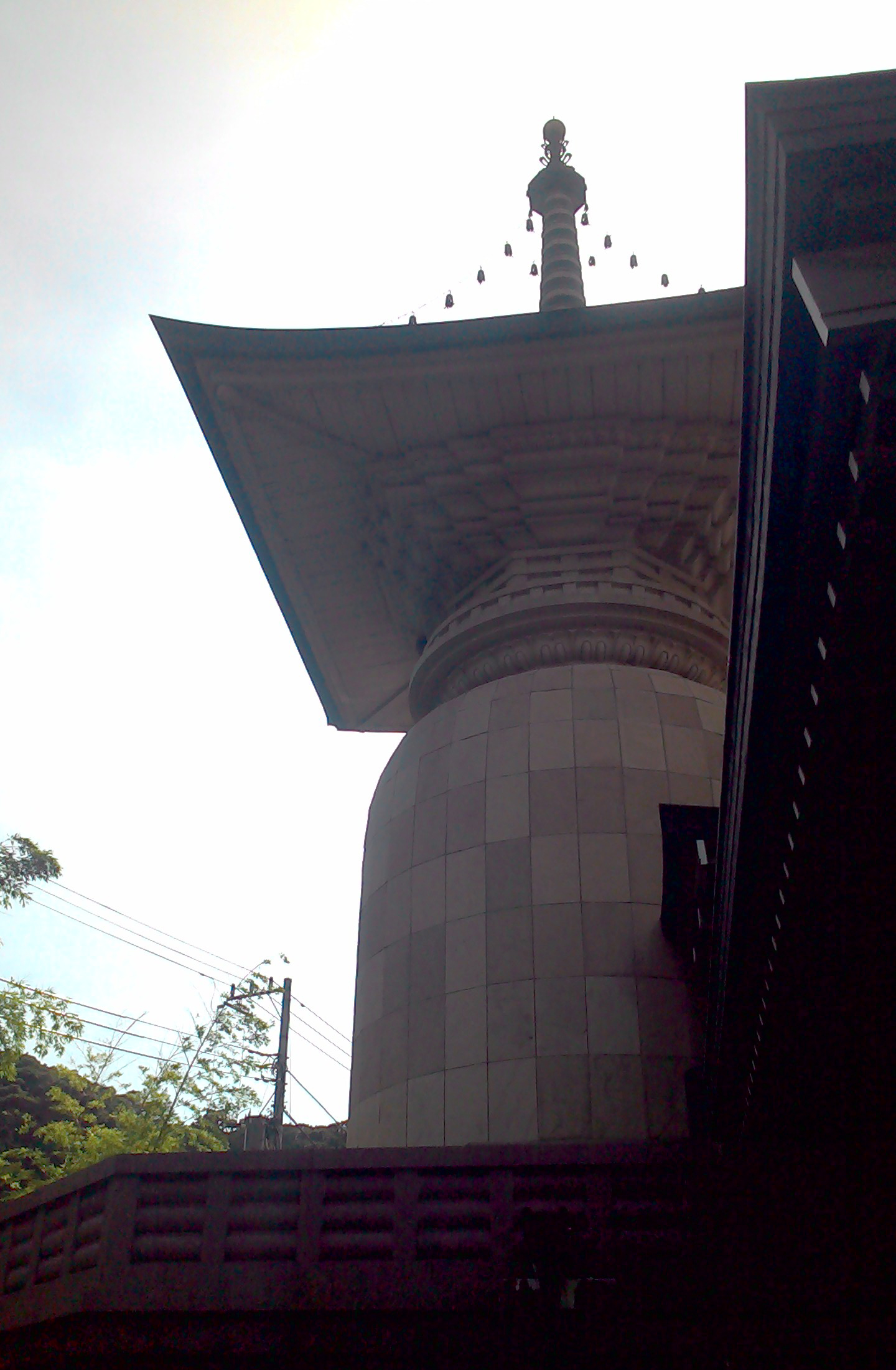
Honshi-den Hoto (Treasure Stupa)

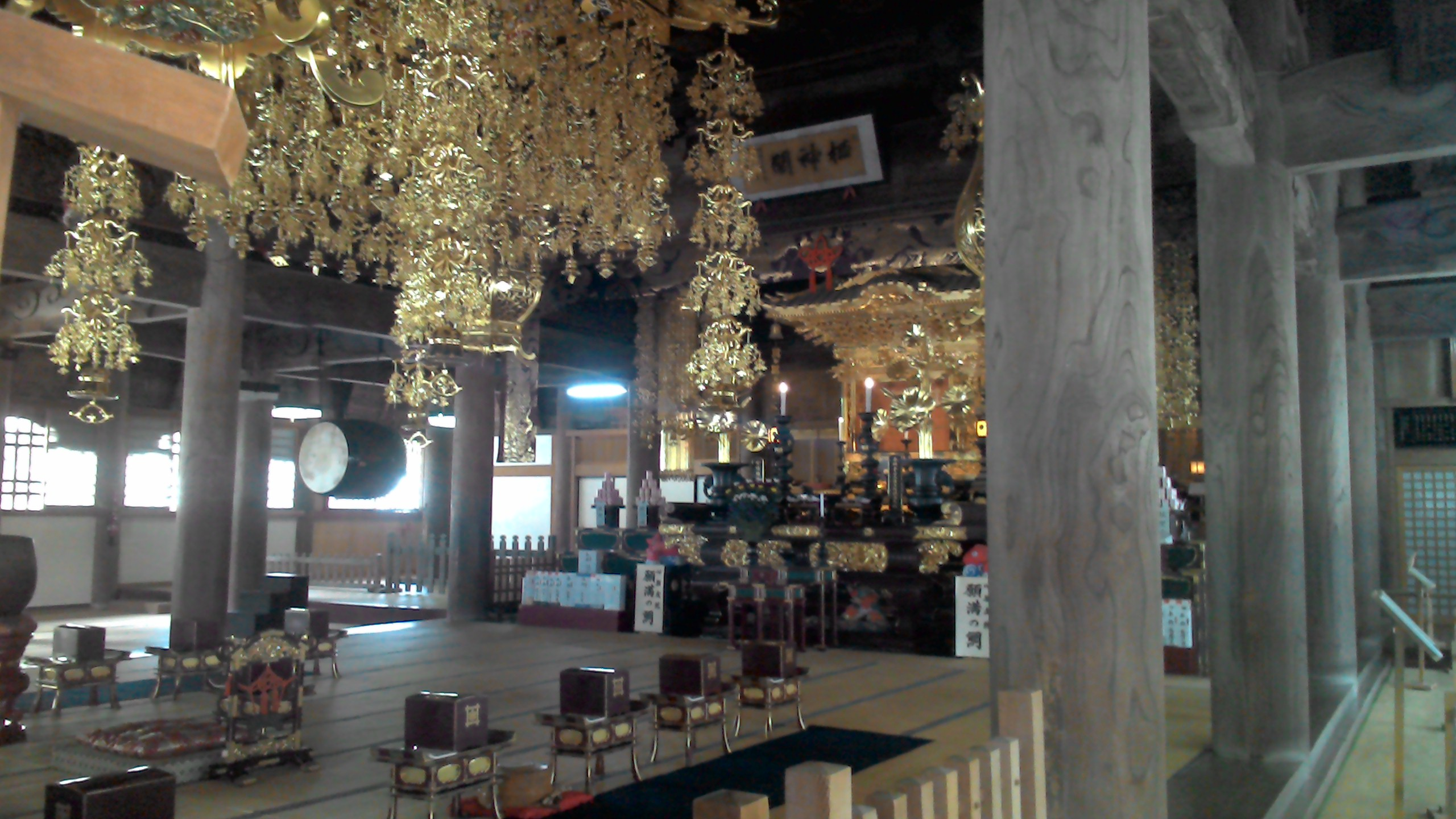
Interior of Hondo

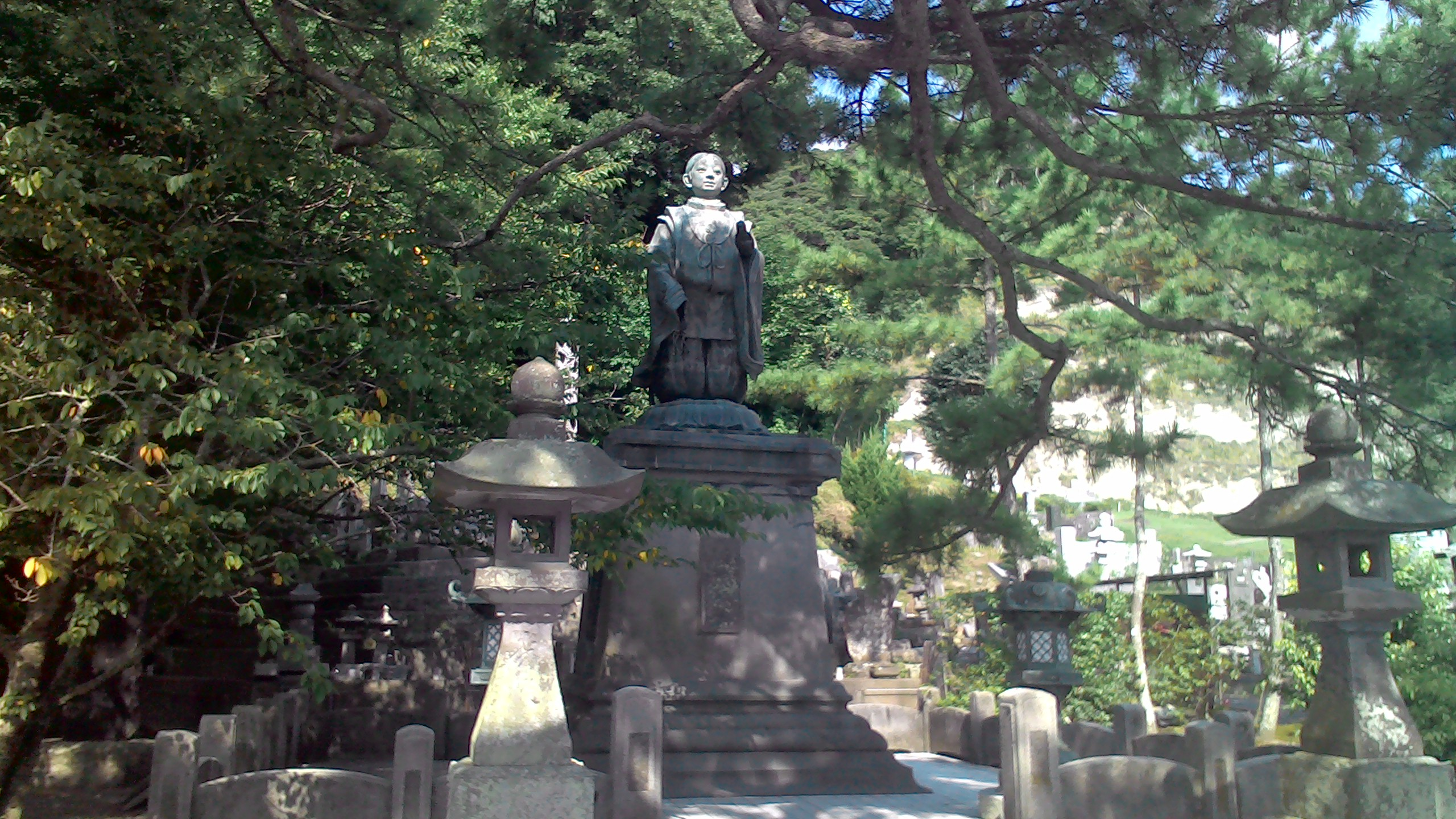
Goyozo

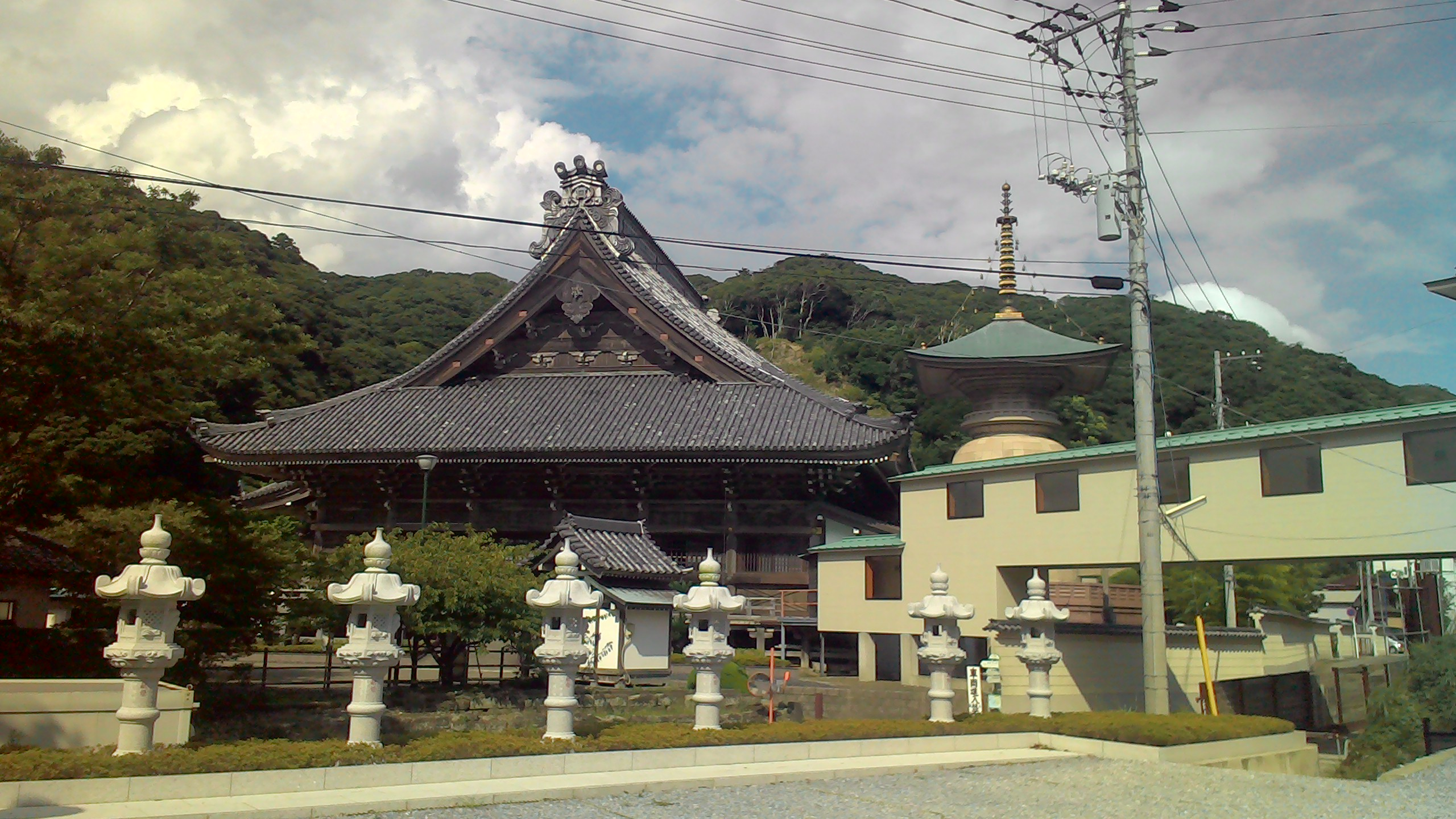
Exterior view
