= Kamogawa Sea World =

Kamogawa Sea World 鴨川シーワールド
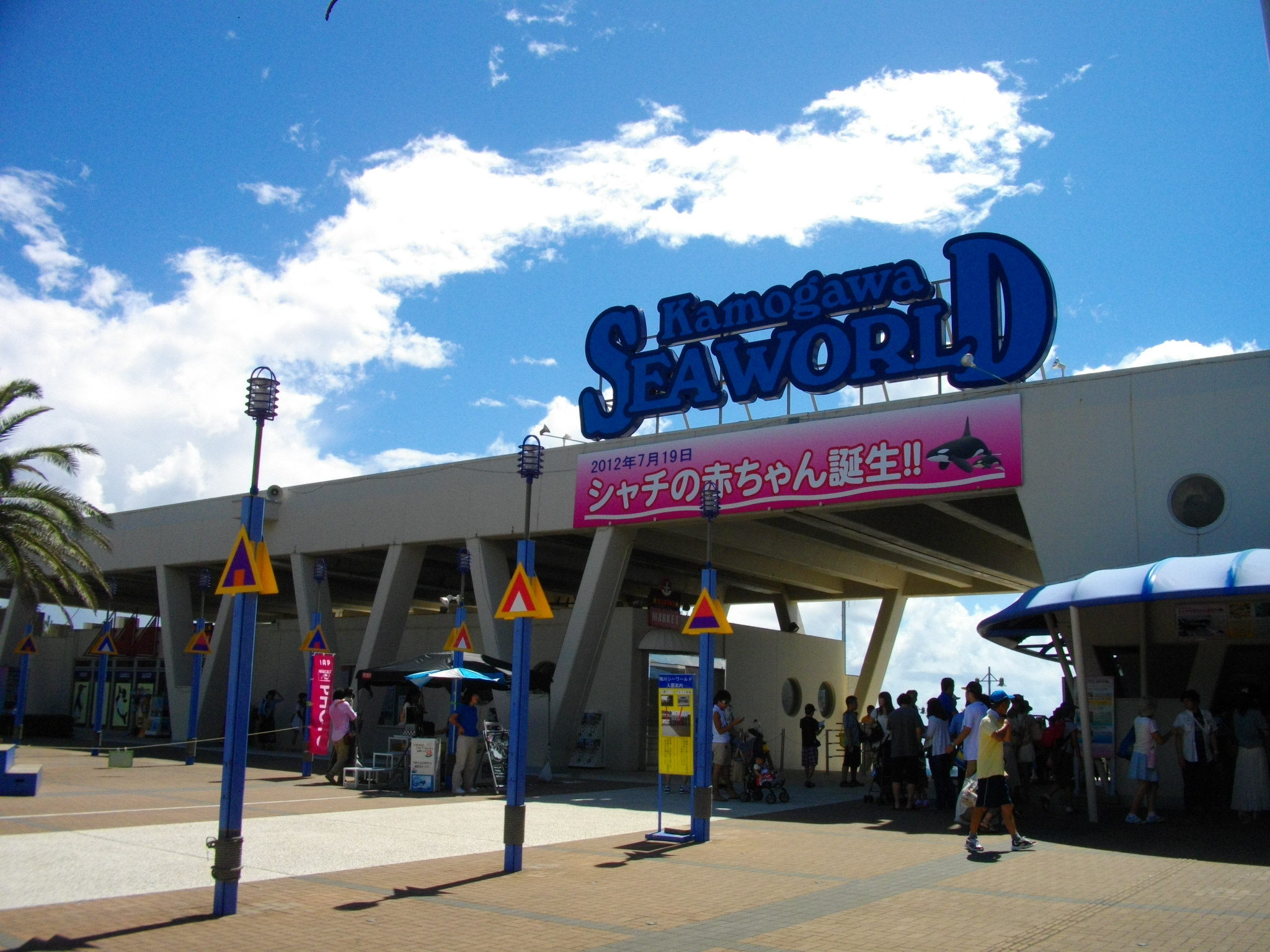
- Entrance
- Interactive map of Kamogawa Sea World 鴨川シーワールド
- Date opened: 1 October 1970
- Location: Kamogawa, Chiba, Japan
- Land area: 22,699 m^{2} (244,330 sq ft)
- Total volume of tanks: 12,000,000 litres (3,170,000 US gal)
- Memberships: JAZA
- Major exhibits: killer whales and Dolphins show etc
- Management: ja:グランビスタ ホテル&リゾート
- Website: www.kamogawa-seaworld.jp/english/

Kamogawa Sea World is a large scale comprehensive marine leisure center/museum equivalent facility located between the Tojo coast and Japan National Route 128 in Kamogawa city, Chiba Prefecture, Japan. It is not affiliated with SeaWorld in any way and is operated by Granvista Hotels & Resorts Co., Ltd. It is a public aquarium and is also a member of the Japanese Association of Zoos and Aquariums (JAZA). In 2021, the park celebrated the 50th anniversary of its opening. The aquarium is accredited as a Museum-equivalent facilities by the Museum Act from Ministry of Education, Culture, Sports, Science and Technology.

== History ==
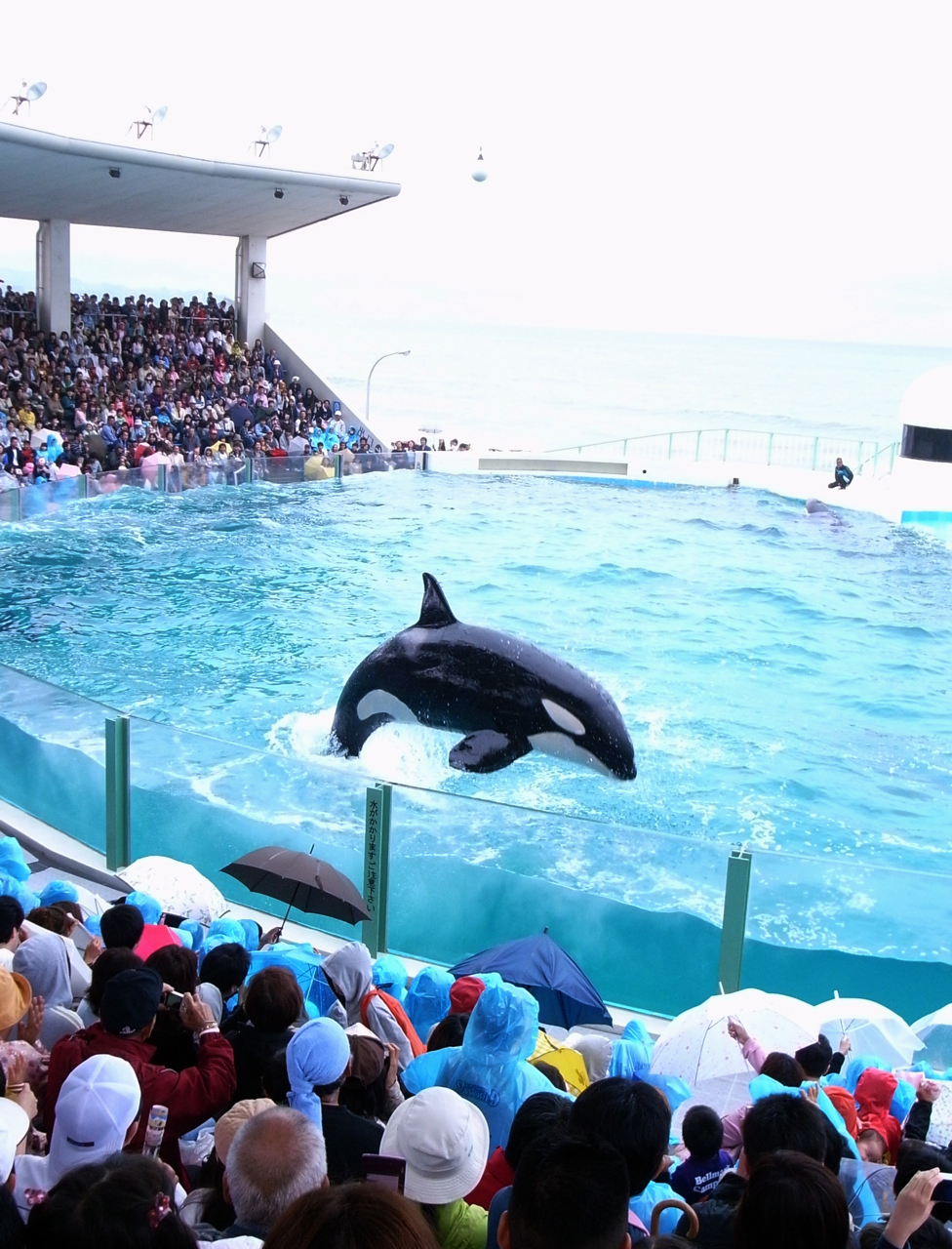
Kamogawa Sea World was the first aquarium in Japan to start breeding killer whales.

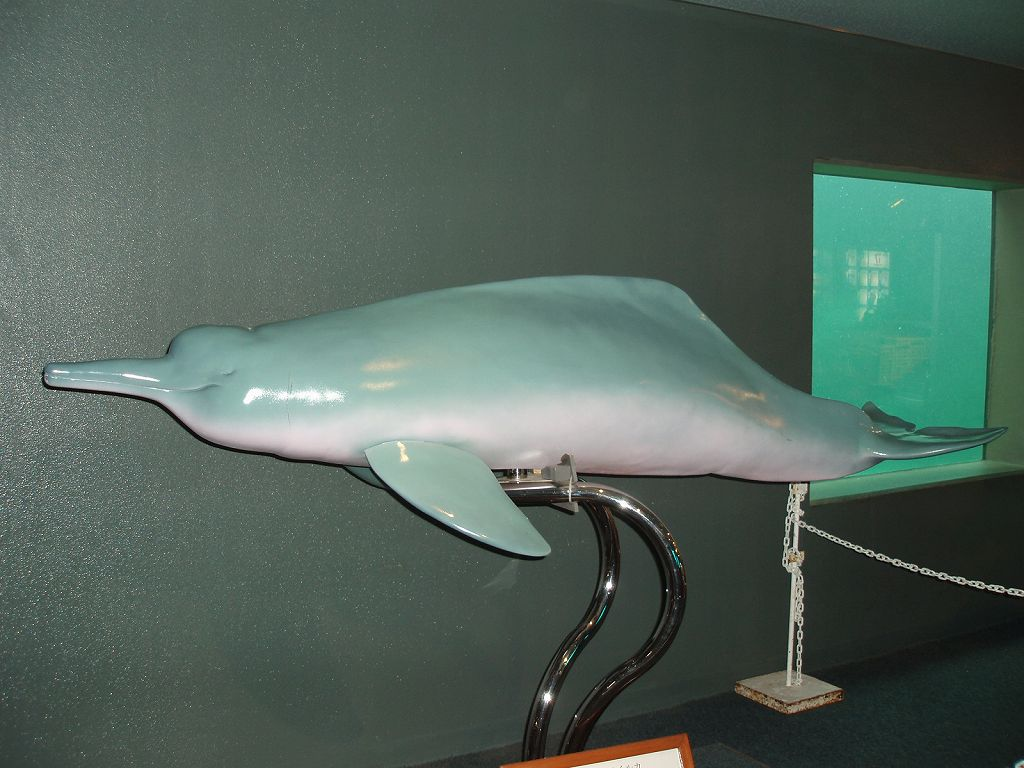
Since October 1970, Kamogawa Sea World has had two Amazon river dolphins named Poco (male) and Deco (female) on public display, and after their deaths, plastic specimens are made and displayed.

In October 1970, Yasushi Tourism Corporation launched a business. The park focused on marine animal exhibitions such as dolphins and sea lions, with breeding and training programs for orcas. There are now performances by marine animals other than killer whales. There are three different zones: the Eco Aquaroam, Tropical Island, and Rocky world, which contains most of the sea creatures, with about 11,000 on display.

By the opening of Sea World, resort hotels such as "Kamogawa Grand Tower" and ryokan / recreation facilities were built in the Kamogawa area, which was a sightseeing area until then, south Boso was transformed into a resort for a whole year. In addition, the hotel "Kamogawa Sea World Hotel" managed directly inside Sea World premises, was founded in 1971.

Since Yasu Tourism was absorbed and merged into Mitsui Kohmura (former North Coast Tourism, now Gran Vista) in 1986, it became the main facility of the company. In 1987, a new establishment of the Ocean Stadium which can accommodate about 2,000 people exclusively for orca performance, Eco Equalome which renewed indoor aquarium panolium in December 1996, Rocky World and Seika Performance only for July 1998 "The Rocky Stadium (about 1,000 people)" has been established, July 2001 has expanded the exhibition facilities, the tropical island to display the fishes in the South Pacific and the sea turtle beach new construction.

As a countermeasure for COVID-19, the number of visitors was restricted from July 23 to August 30, 2020.

== Research and conservation ==
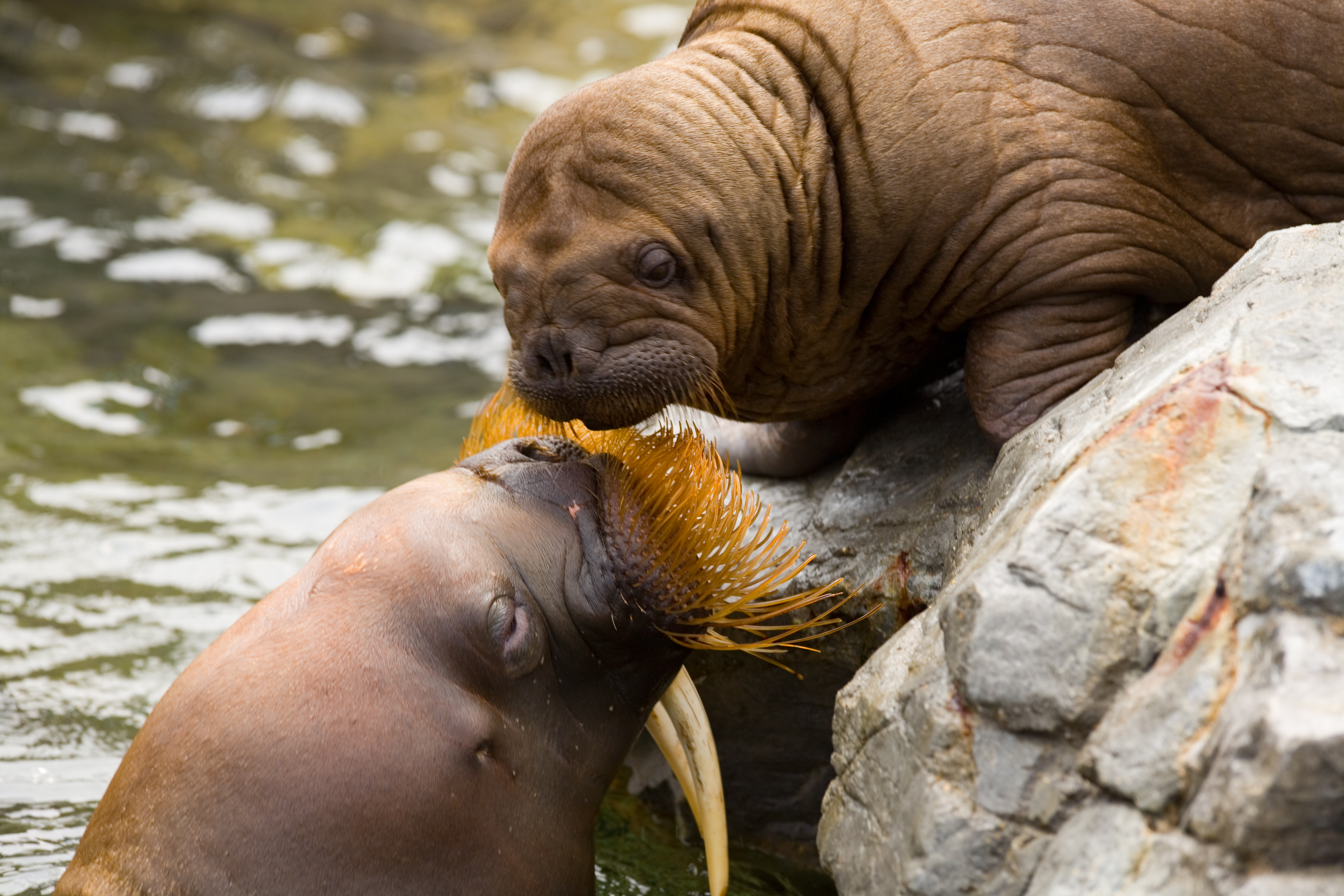
The walrus has been bred "Mook (female)" and "Tuck (male)" since 1983, and succeeded in giving birth to the first child in 1994, and was named "Chucky (male)" and won the breeding award.

So far, aquarium has succeeded in breeding fish and sea turtles. During 2003, a total of nine killer whales, walruses, Caspian seals, steller sea lions (two), California sea lions (two), and bottlenose dolphins (two) were born. In addition, the ocean sunfish named Kukey, who started captivity in 1982, set a world record for captivity for 2,993 days, living for eight years. Kukey was 72 cm (2.36 ft) at the time of delivery, but was 187 cm (6.14 ft) in size at the time of death. About 1-3 California sea lions are born every two years. In the past, steller sea lions gave birth at the same pace as other sea lions, but it seems that there are no plans for a while because the male "Nosa" died in 2007.

The creatures that have received the Japanese Association of Zoos and Aquariums (JAZA) Breeding Award are as follows. Pictures of the plates and the award-winning creatures are on display in the Eco Equalome.

- Thorny seahorse
- Clownfish
- Australian Sea Lion-World's first non-Australian facility
- Walrus
- Northern sea lion
- California sea lion
- Killer whale-"Lovey"
- Caspian Seal-"Kapi"
- Bottlenose dolphin-artificial insemination (5th case in the world)
- Asian sheepshead wrasse
- Banded pipefish

== Killer whales ==
Since December 2015, Kamogawa Sea World houses three killer whales – "Lovey" (female, born January 11, 1998), "Lara" (female, born February 8, 2001), "Ran" (female, born February 25, 2006), "Luna" (Female, born on July 19, 2012). Lovey, Lara, and Ran are sisters, and Luna is Lovey's daughter. In addition, two surviving killer whales Earth, and Lynn) were bred at the Port of Nagoya Public Aquarium, while Stella and Ran were transferred to Kobe Suma Sea World from Port of Nagoya Public Aquarium and Kamogawa Sea World respectively on 29 March 2024 and on 24 April 2024.

=== Killer whale breeding ===
Although killer whales have been bred since the aquarium's opening, it was not until 1995 that they were able to successfully breed in captivity. "Maggie (female)" gave birth on March 3, but died just 30 minutes later due to her breech birth. The second calf, who gave birth on October 5, 1997, died the same day, and Maggie died two days later. This is not well known now because another killer whale gave birth later, but an FRP replica of the bred individual is displayed on the first basement floor of Rocky World as a "newborn killer whale" with a bulleted explanation plate.

Breeding was confirmed between "Stella (female)" and "Bingo (male)" in 1997, and in January 1998, their first calf was successfully born and was named "Lovey", and won the breeding award. It is said that this feat further increased the name recognition of Kamogawa Sea World and the number of visitors remained steady. Later, a total of four children (all females) were born and are the offspring of the same pair, "Lara" in 2001, "Sara" (died in 2006) in 2003, and "Ran" in 2006, and they play an active part in the performance. In October 2008, a third-generation individual, "Earth (male)," was born between a 10-year-old Lovey and an estimated 23-year-old "Oscar (male)." From the same pair, "Luna (female)" was also born in July 2012.

== Facility ==
Since it has a long site in the east and west, it is listed in order from the east side. The total tank water volume of the aquarium is 12,000,000 litres (3,170,000 US gal), and aquariums focusing on breeding whales and pinnipeds.

=== Aquarium ===
- Ocean Stadium
- Surf Stadium
- Marine Theater
- Rocky Stadium
- Eco aquaroam
- Rocky Stadium
- Eco aquaroam
- Tropical Island
- Rocky World
- Polar Adventure
- Pirika Forest
- Sea Turtle Beach
- Pelican Pond
- Steller Sea Lion Sea
- Sea Lion and Seal Sea
- Walrus Sea
- Penguin Sea
- Dolphin Sea

=== Restaurant ===
- Restaurant Ocean
- Food Court Mauri
- Buffet Restaurant Sun Cruise

=== Gift shop ===
- Gift Shop Marine Market
- Bazaar Court Raoi

=== Accommodation ===
- Kamogawa Sea World Hotel

== See also ==
- List of captive orcas
- Captive killer whales
- Gamera vs. Zigra - the 1971 kaiju film tied-in with Kamogawa Sea World, making it the last installment of the Showa Gamera series by Daiei Film shortly before its bankruptcy.
