= Kameda College of Health Sciences =

- 亀田医療大学
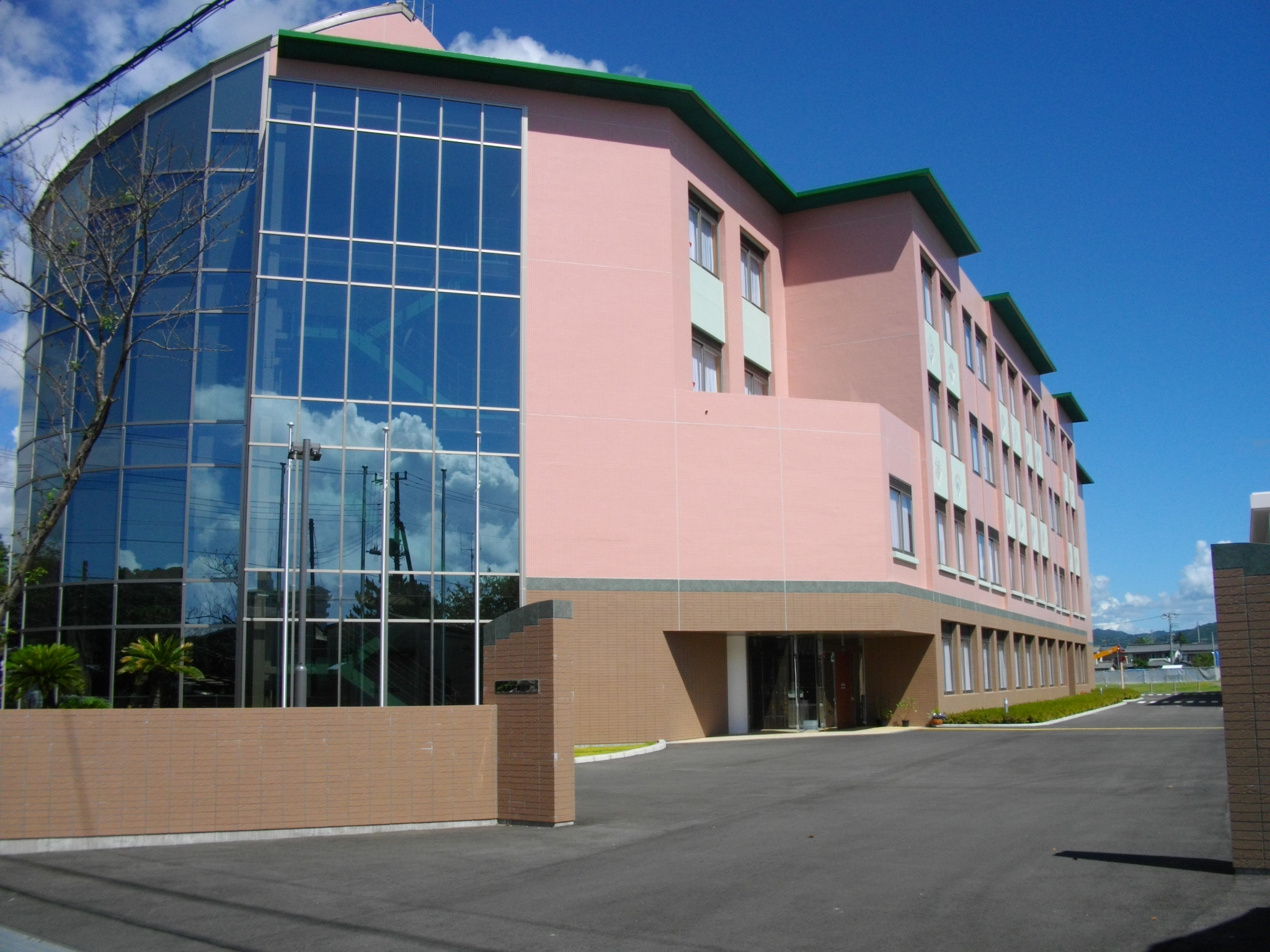
- Type: Private
- Established: Founded 2012; Chartered 1954
- Location: 462 Yokosuka, Kamogawa, Chiba; Japan 296-0001, Kamogawa, Chiba, Japan; 35°40′N 140°36′E
- Campus: Rural
- Website: www.kameda.ac.jp
- Location in Chiba Prefecture, Japan

Kameda College of Health Sciences (亀田医療大学, Kameda Iryou daigaku) is a private university in Japan. The campus is located in Kamogawa, Chiba. It opened to the public in April 2012.
