= Kamogawa, Chiba =

Kamogawa 鴨川市
- City
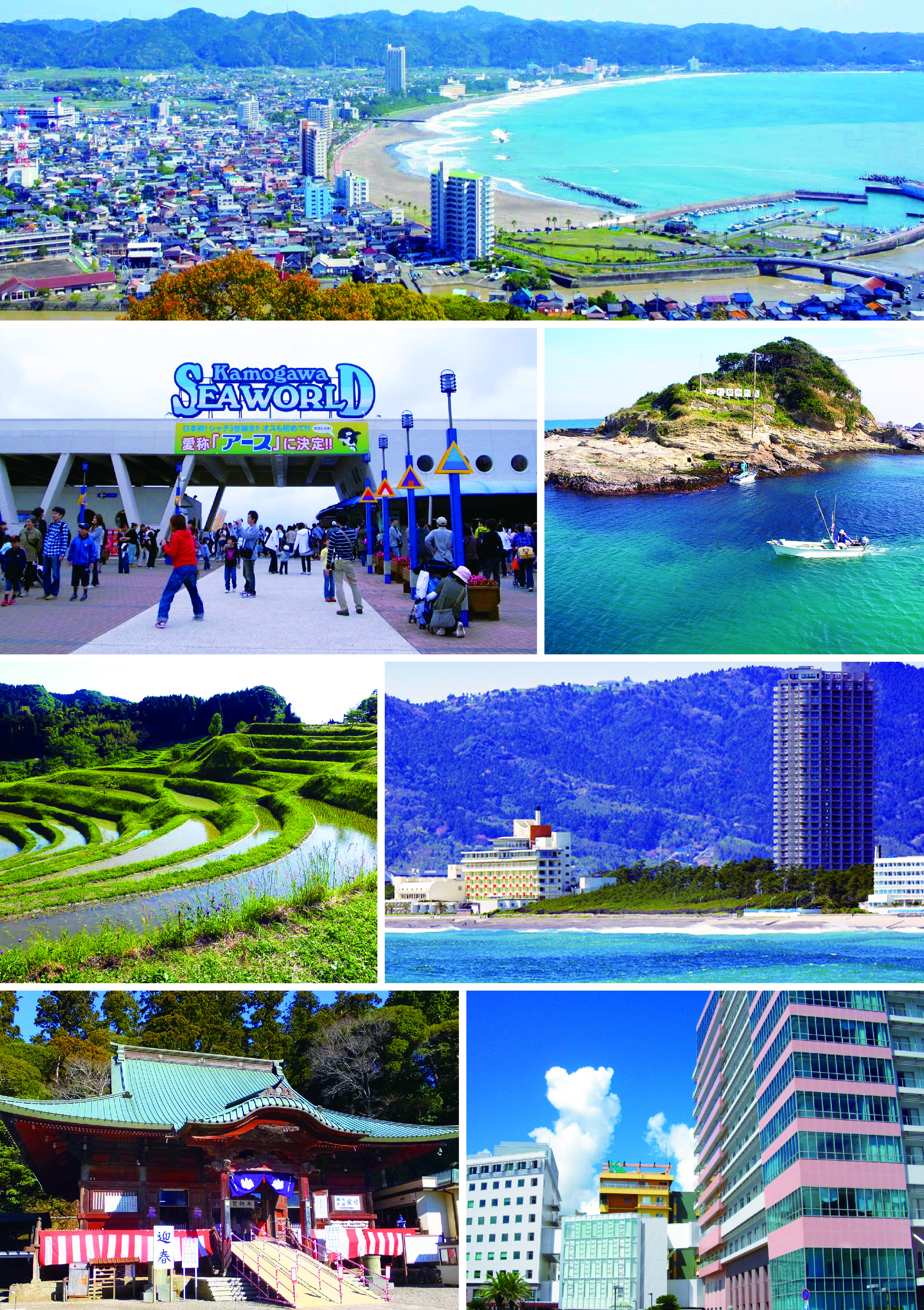
View from Uomizuka Tower
Kamogawa Sea World	Niemonjima
Oyama Rice Terraces	Kamogawa Grand Hotel; Kamogawa Grand Tower
Seichō-ji	Kameda General Hospital]
- Flag Seal

- Location of Kamogawa in Chiba Prefecture

- Coordinates: 35°06′50.5″N 140°05′56″E
- Country: Japan
- Region: Kantō
- Prefecture: Chiba
- First official re: 718 AD
- Town settled: April 1, 1889
- City settled: March 31, 1971

Government
  - Mayor: Hidewa Watanabe (渡辺秀和) - from April 2026

Area
  - Total: 191.30 km^{2} (73.86 sq mi)

Population (December 2020)
  - Total: 31,722
  - Density: 165.82/km^{2} (429.48/sq mi)
- Time zone: UTC+9 (Japan Standard Time)
- Phone number: 04-7092-1111
- Address: 1450 Yokosuka, Kamogawa-shi, Chiba-ken 296-8601
- Climate: Cfa
- Website: Official website
- Symbols
- Fish: Sparidae
- Flower: Rapeseed
- Tree: Pine

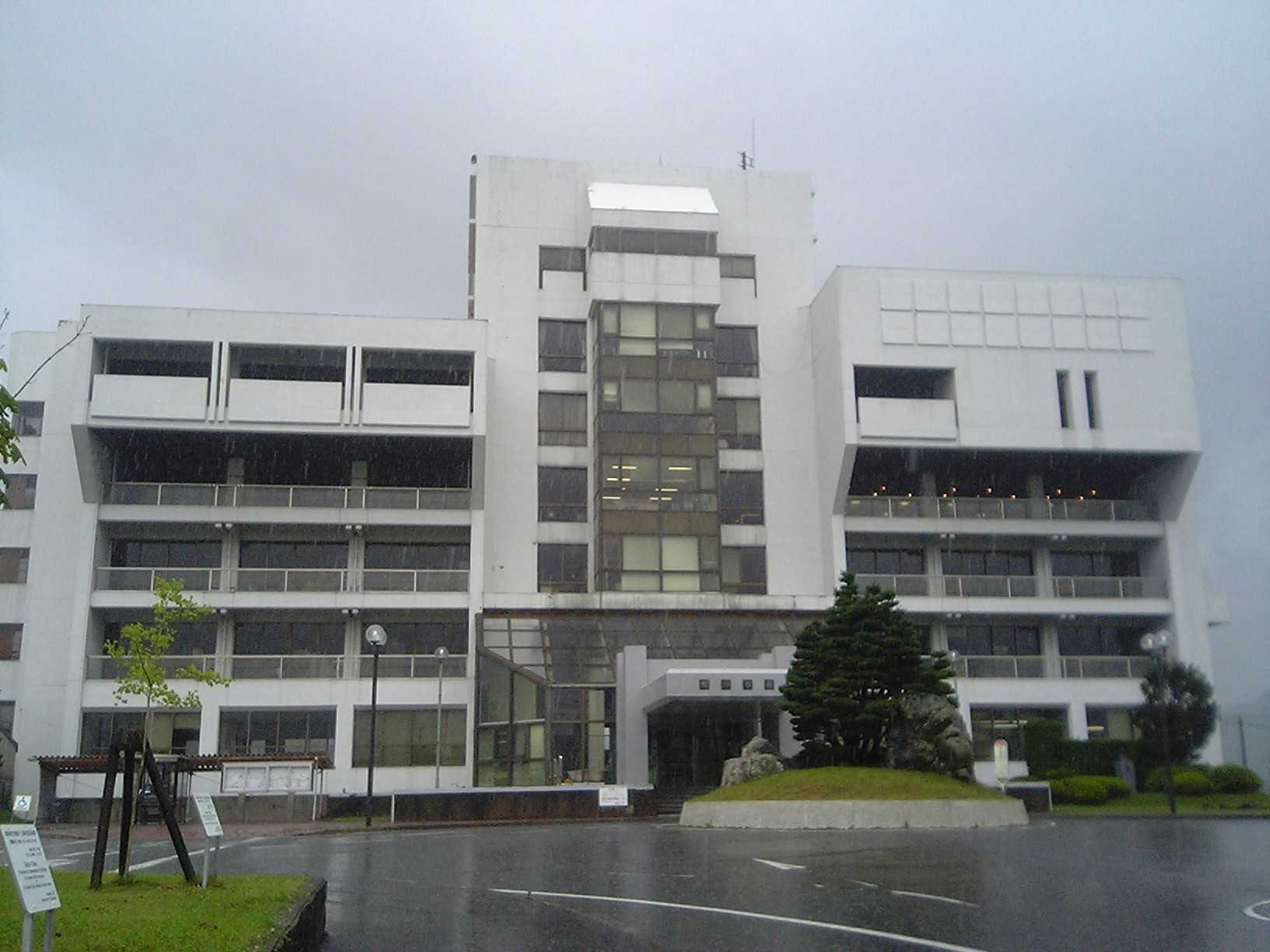
Kamogawa City Office

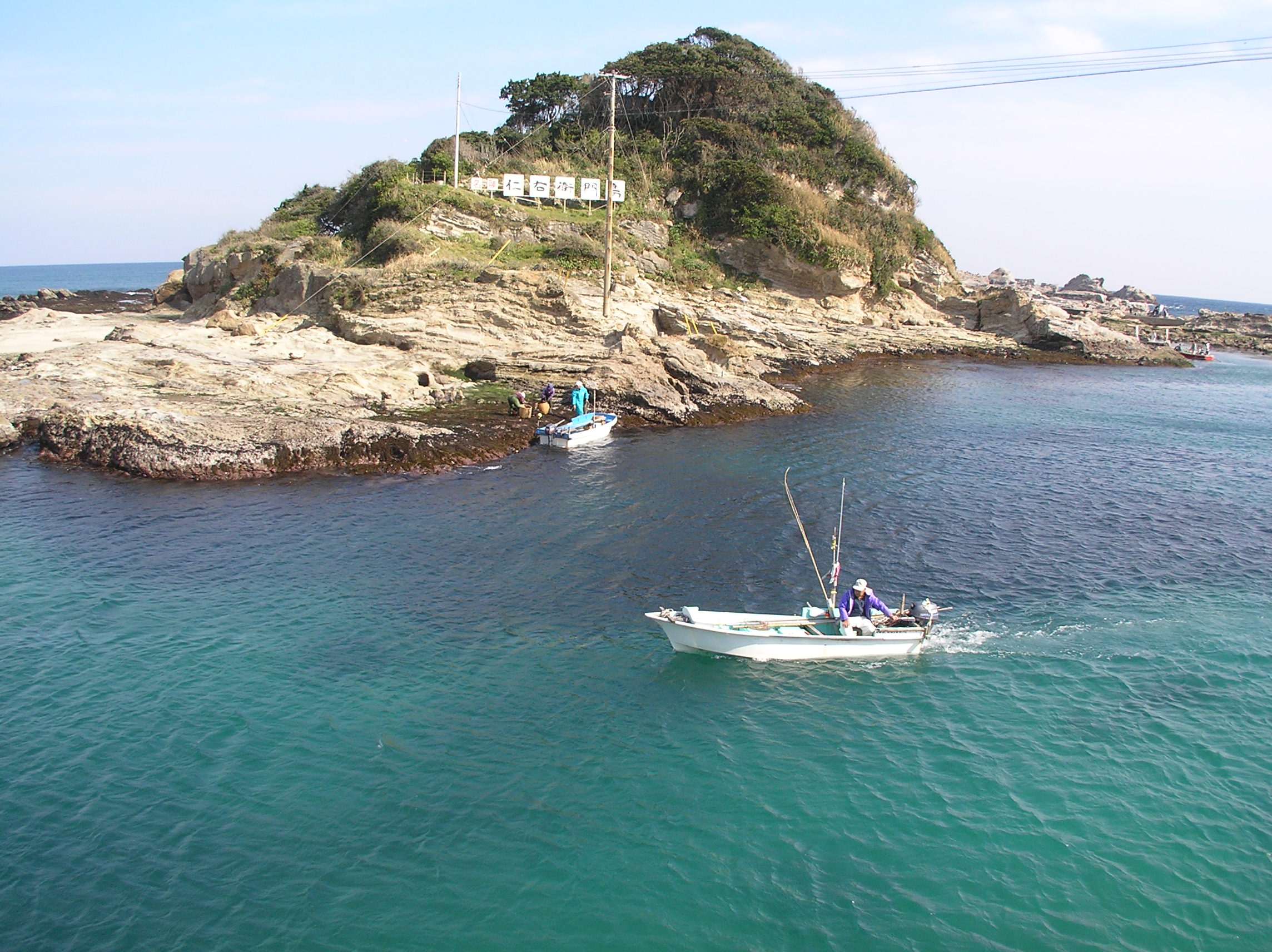
Niemonjima

Kamogawa (鴨川市, Kamogawa-shi) is a city located in Chiba Prefecture, Japan. As of 1 December 2020, the city had an estimated population of 31,722 in 14,558 households and a population density of 170 persons per km^{2}. The total area of the city is 191.14 square kilometers (73.80 sq mi).

The name of the city consists of two kanji characters: the first, kamo (鴨), meaning "duck", and the second, kawa (川), meaning "river".

== Geography ==
Kamogawa is near the southeastern tip of the Bōsō Peninsula, facing the North Pacific Ocean, about 50 km south of the prefectural capital, Chiba, and about 85 km from the capital of Japan, Tokyo. Kamogawa is home to Mount Atago, which at 408.2 m (1,339 ft) is the highest point in Chiba Prefecture. Mount Kiyosumi (337 m (1,106 ft)) is home to Seichō-ji. The Kamo River (22.25 kilometers (13.83 mi)) empties into the Pacific Ocean at Kamogawa.

=== Neighboring municipalities ===
Chiba Prefecture

- Futtsu
- Katsuura
- Kimitsu
- Kyonan
- Minamibōsō
- Ōtaki

=== Climate ===
Kamogawa has a humid subtropical climate (Köppen Cfa) characterized by warm summers and cool winters with light to no snowfall. The average annual temperature in Kamogawa is 15.5 °C. The average annual rainfall is 1833 mm with September as the wettest month. The temperatures are highest on average in August, at around 26.0 °C, and lowest in January, at around 5.9 °C.

Climate data for Kamogawa (1991−2020 normals, extremes 1978−present)
Month	Jan	Feb	Mar	Apr	May	Jun	Jul	Aug	Sep	Oct	Nov	Dec	Year
Record high °C (°F)	20.6 (69.1)	24.8 (76.6)	25.7 (78.3)	27.7 (81.9)	31.2 (88.2)	34.8 (94.6)	36.1 (97.0)	37.3 (99.1)	36.7 (98.1)	32.7 (90.9)	26.4 (79.5)	24.1 (75.4)	37.3 (99.1)
Mean daily maximum °C (°F)	11.1 (52.0)	11.8 (53.2)	14.5 (58.1)	18.8 (65.8)	22.5 (72.5)	25.0 (77.0)	28.7 (83.7)	30.7 (87.3)	27.9 (82.2)	22.9 (73.2)	18.3 (64.9)	13.7 (56.7)	20.5 (68.9)
Daily mean °C (°F)	6.2 (43.2)	6.8 (44.2)	9.8 (49.6)	14.4 (57.9)	18.4 (65.1)	21.3 (70.3)	24.9 (76.8)	26.4 (79.5)	23.5 (74.3)	18.5 (65.3)	13.6 (56.5)	8.8 (47.8)	16.1 (60.9)
Mean daily minimum °C (°F)	1.7 (35.1)	2.2 (36.0)	5.2 (41.4)	9.9 (49.8)	14.6 (58.3)	18.2 (64.8)	22.0 (71.6)	23.2 (73.8)	20.2 (68.4)	14.9 (58.8)	9.4 (48.9)	4.3 (39.7)	12.2 (53.9)
Record low °C (°F)	−6.4 (20.5)	−6.1 (21.0)	−3.3 (26.1)	0.1 (32.2)	6.0 (42.8)	9.8 (49.6)	13.9 (57.0)	16.0 (60.8)	11.6 (52.9)	5.9 (42.6)	0.2 (32.4)	−4.8 (23.4)	−6.4 (20.5)
Average precipitation mm (inches)	90.1 (3.55)	85.4 (3.36)	170.7 (6.72)	155.6 (6.13)	164.4 (6.47)	217.3 (8.56)	171.9 (6.77)	91.2 (3.59)	214.3 (8.44)	239.9 (9.44)	147.4 (5.80)	89.8 (3.54)	1,837.8 (72.35)
Average precipitation days (≥ 1.0 mm)	6.9	7.1	11.4	11.1	10.4	12.0	10.1	6.4	11.3	11.7	9.5	7.2	115.1
Mean monthly sunshine hours	187.9	158.0	166.1	185.6	191.4	140.0	179.0	224.4	155.2	138.8	150.6	174.0	2,053.4
Source: Japan Meteorological Agency

== Demographics ==
Per Japanese census data, the population of Kamogawa has been gradually decreasing over the past 70 years.

Historical population
Year	Pop.	±%
1950	48,958	—
1960	46,054	−5.9%
1970	42,308	−8.1%
1980	41,159	−2.7%
1990	39,866	−3.1%
2000	37,653	−5.6%
2010	35,766	−5.0%
2020	32,116	−10.2%

== History ==
=== Early history ===
The area of present-day Kamogawa was part of ancient Awa Province. Nichiren (1222 – 1282) was born in the Kominato district of Kamogawa, and his birthplace is commemorated at Tanjō-ji. During the Edo period, it was mostly tenryō territory controlled directly by the Tokugawa shogunate, with portions under the control of the feudal domains of Funagata Domain, Tateyama Domain, Iwasuki Domain and Tsurumaki Domain. The short-lived (1638-1690) Tōjō Domain and the Bakumatsu period Hanabusa Domain were also located within the borders of modern Kamogawa.

=== Modern history ===
In 1877, Kamogawa suffered a notable cholera outbreak. At the start of the Meiji period, Kamogawa consisted of all of Nagasa District with two towns and nine villages, and two villages from neighboring Asai District. All of these villages and towns (including Kamogawa Town) became part of Awa District in 1890. In 1927 Awa-Kamogawa Station became the terminus of both the Sotobō Line and the Uchibō Line. The city sustained injuries and fatalities during World War II via aerial bombing by the United States. The city was occupied by American forces after the war. Soon after, land reform and economic reform were carried out in Kamogawa. In 1958 the coastal areas of Kamogawa became a part of Minami Bōsō Quasi-National Park, and the town became a tourist destination as a result of the establishment of the park. Kamogawa was elevated to city status on March 31, 1971. On February 11, 2005, the town of Amatsukominato (from Awa District) was merged into Kamogawa.

== Government ==
Kamogawa has a mayor-council form of government with a directly elected mayor and a unicameral city council of 18 members. Kamogawa contributes one member to the Chiba Prefectural Assembly. In terms of national politics, the city is part of Chiba 12th district of the lower house of the Diet of Japan.

== Economy ==
Kamogawa serves as a commercial center for the surrounding region of south-central Chiba Prefecture. Commercial fishing remains the primary industry in Kamogawa, which has five active fishing ports. The city is noted for its sardine and mackerel production. Rice farming and floriculture are practiced. The tourist industry is a growing component of the local economy, with visitors attracted to the area's beaches, hot spring resorts, Kamogawa Seaworld, and the Futomi Flower Center.

== Transportation ==
=== Railway ===
JR East – Uchibō Line

- Emi – Futomi – Awa-Kamogawa

JR East – Sotobō Line

- Awa-Kamogawa –Awa-Amatsu - Awa-Kominato

=== Highway ===
- National Route 128
- National Route 410

== Education ==
- Josai International University – Kamogawa Campus
- Kameda College of Health Sciences
- Toyo University – Kamogawa Campus
- Waseda University – Kamogawa Campus
- Kamogawa has nine public elementary schools and three public middle schools operated by the city government, and one public high school operated by the Chiba Prefectural Board of Education. There is also one private high school.

== Sister cities ==
- Minobu, Yamanashi, Japan, since 1991
- Manitowoc, Wisconsin, United States, since 1995

== Local attractions ==
- Kamogawa Sea World, noted especially for its captive orcas and numerous other sea creatures
- Seichō-ji – Buddhist temple associated with Nichiren
- Tanjōji – Buddhist temple associated with Nichiren

== Noted people from Kamogawa ==
- Tokiko Kato, singer, composer, lyricist, and actress
- Shimaguchi Komao, composer and writer
- Yuka Murayama, writer
- Nichiren, noted Buddhist prelate

== Cultural references ==
The anime series Lagrange: The Flower of Rin-ne is set in Kamogawa.
