= Nitta Hachirō =

Japanese singer

Nitta Hachirō (新田八郎) (October 14, 1908 – July 3, 1989) was a Japanese singer of ryūkōka, gunka, and opera.

== Biography ==
Nitta was born Takeuchi Shōichi (竹内省一) in the village of Shussei (today part of Tsugaru), Nishitsugaru District, Aomori Prefecture in 1908. His father, an elementary school teacher, encouraged Nitta's academic promise. He later enrolled in the Aomori Prefectural Normal School (today part of Hirosaki University). Although initially determined to become a teacher himself, Nitta's budding interest in music eventually led to his enrollment at the Tokyo School of Music in 1926. The following year, Nitta dropped out and returned to Aomori, where he taught at a girls' school and composed music in his spare time.

In 1935, Nitta returned to Tokyo to continue his musical studies. During this time, he signed onto Taihei Records as a singer and performed in opera, using the stage name "Takeuchi Tatsuo" (竹内龍夫). Three years later, he moved to Nippon Victor as an exclusive artist, whereupon he chose "Nitta Hachirō" as his permanent stage name. Nitta enjoyed the peak of his fame during the late 1930s and early 1940s. His most famous song from this period was "South Seas Voyage" (南洋航路, Nan'yō kōro), composed by Shimaguchi Komao, although it did not become popular until the end of the Pacific War. Japanese servicemen deployed in the Nan'yō region devised a contrafactum of the song called "Rabaul Ditty" (ラバウル小唄, Rabauru kouta), which was popularized throughout Japan after they were demobilized.

Nitta made recordings for Nippon Polydor and King Records after the war. He died at the age of 81 in 1989.
