= Kobe Suma Sea World =

Kobe Suma Sea World (神戸須磨シーワールド)
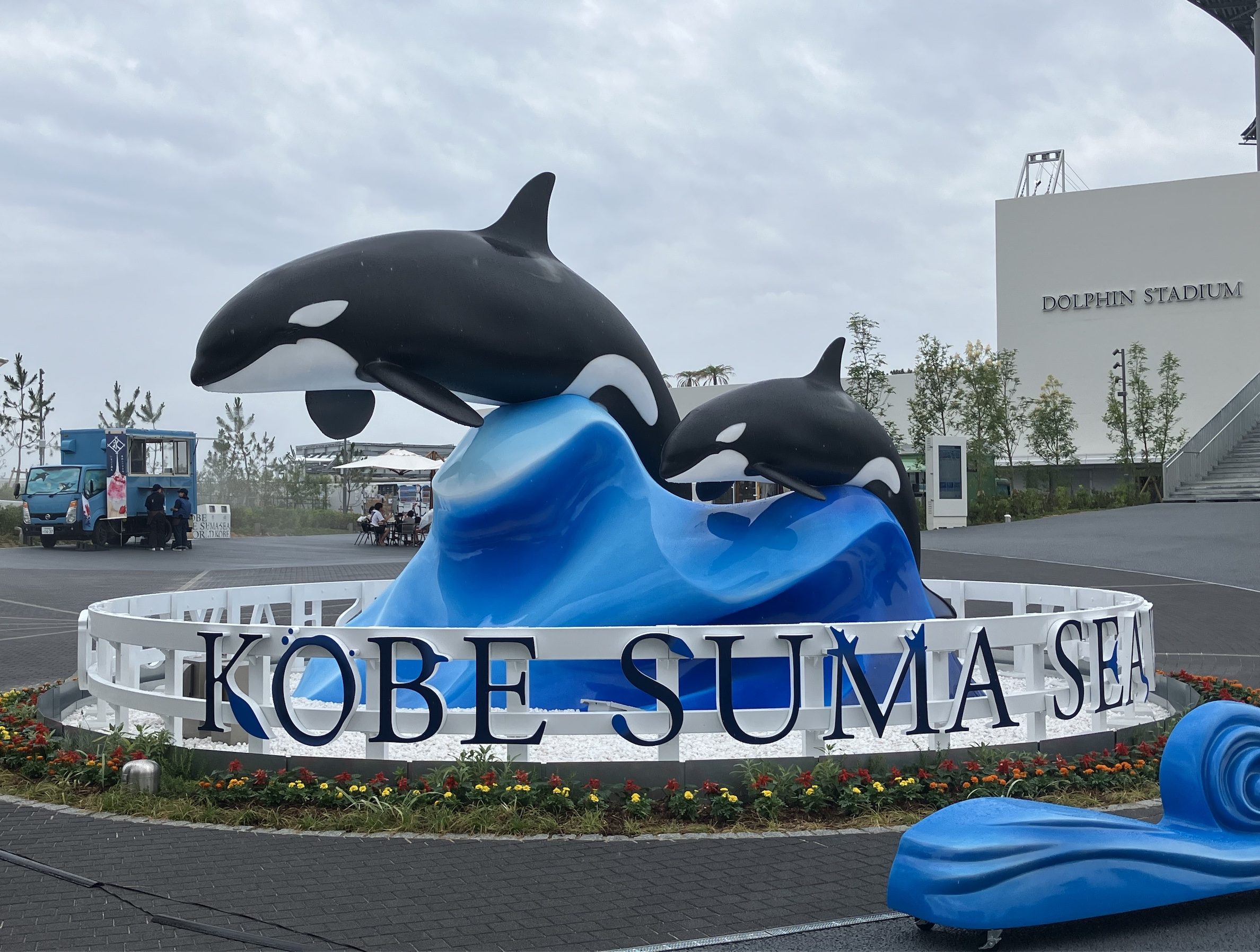
- Interactive map of Kobe Suma Sea World (神戸須磨シーワールド)
- 36.7985°N 137.3881°E
- Date opened: 2024
- Location: Suma-ku, Kobe, Japan
- Land area: 101,900 m^{2} (1,097,000 sq ft)
- Total volume of tanks: 14,000,000 litres (3,698,000 US gal)
- Memberships: JAZA
- Management: Grand Vista Hotel & Resort
- Website: https://www.kobesuma-seaworld.jp/

The Kobe Suma Sea World (神戸須磨シーワールド, Kōbe Suma shīwārudo), formerly known as the Suma Aqualife Park (須磨海浜水族園), is a public aquarium located in Suma-ku, Kobe, Japan. Suma Aqualife Park was closed on May 31, 2023, privatized, and later reopened as Kobe Suma Sea World in June 2024 at its current location. It is a member of the Japanese Association of Zoos and Aquariums (JAZA).

== History ==
=== Warakuen aquarium ===
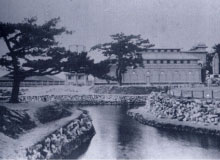
Warakuen aquarium photographed in 1897

In 1895, when the 4th National Industrial Exhibition was held in Kyoto, the city of Kobe, which cooperated with the event, built the Wadamisaki Water Tribe Nursery in the amusement park Warakuen at Cape Wadamasaki as a facility attached to the exhibition. was established. It consists of the Hyogo Aquaria Room and the Aquaria Rearing Pond.

Even after the exposition ended, the aquarium remained, and in 1897, the Warakuen Aquarium (和楽園水族館) was built at the amusement park Warakuen, which was the venue for the 2nd Japan Fisheries Exposition held at Cape Wada in Hyogo Ward, Kobe City.

Warakuen Aquarium was Japan's first aquarium equipped with a full-scale filtration system. It was designed by Kai Iijima, a professor at the University of Tokyo, and was built using Kobe's advanced shipbuilding technology, with a seawater tank equipped with full-scale circulation filtration equipment equipped with pumps, valves, and piping.

After the exposition ended, the aquarium was moved to the grounds of Minatogawa Shrine in April 1902, and closed in February 1910.

=== Minatogawa Aquarium ===
In September 1930, the Minatogawa Aquarium(湊川水族館) was built by the City of Kobe in Minatogawa Park to coincide with the Kobe Seaport Exposition, and was closed in February 1943 due to the intensification of World War II, and was destroyed by fire during the Kobe Air Raid in March 1945.

=== Suma Aquarium ===
In 1957, 12 years after the end of the war, the Suma Aquarium(須磨水族館) was established. The Suma Aquarium was requested to be an aquarium suitable for the international port city of Kobe, and it was opened.

In 1958, the aquarium was designated as a facility equivalent to a museum the Museum Act from then Ministry of Education, Culture, Sports, Science and Technology, and began active social education activities. At that time, the aquarium was calling itself the "Aquarium Science Class" and creating programs in cooperation with elementary schools and other schools.

=== Suma Aqualife Park ===
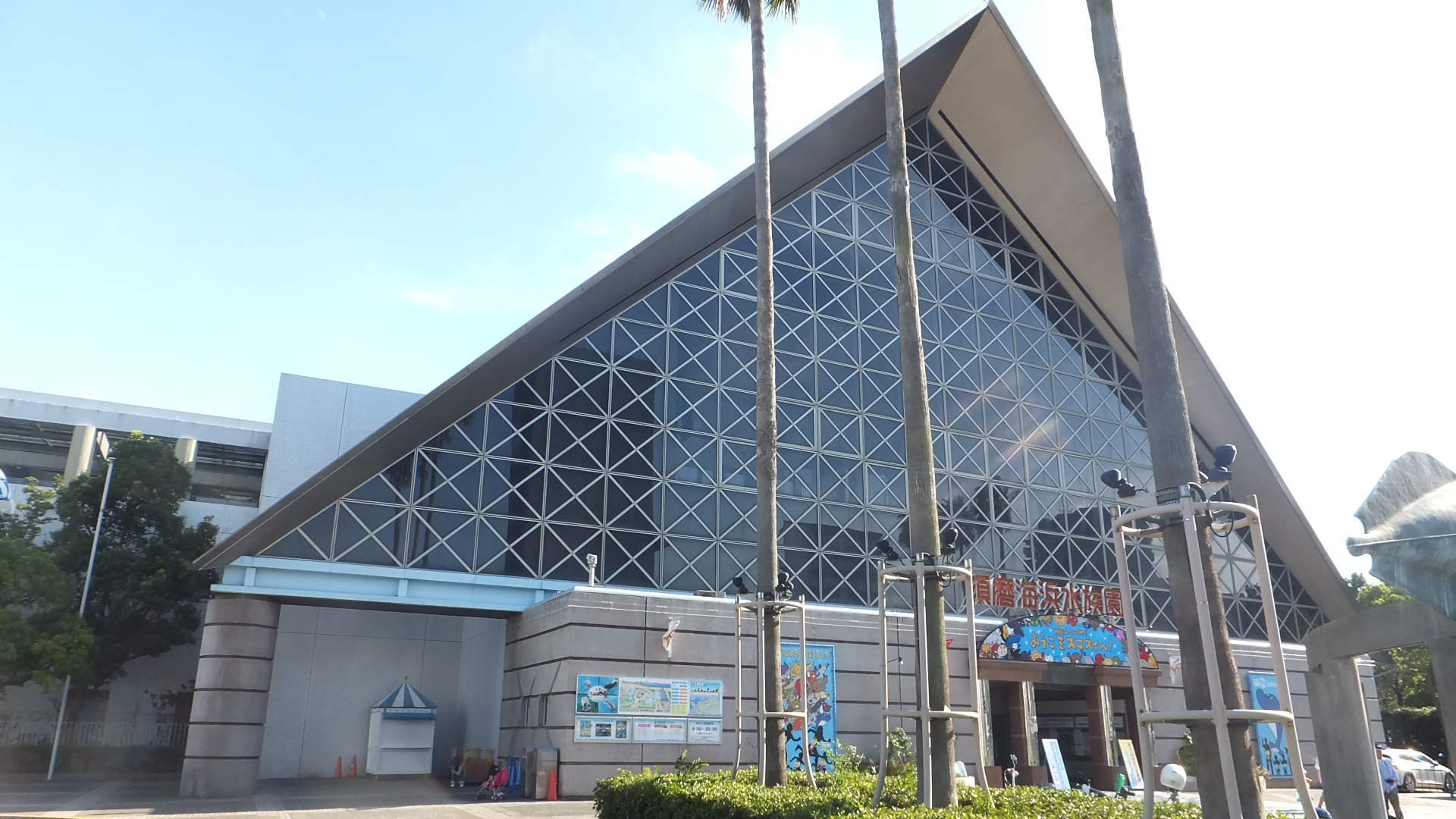
Entrance of Suma Aqualife Park

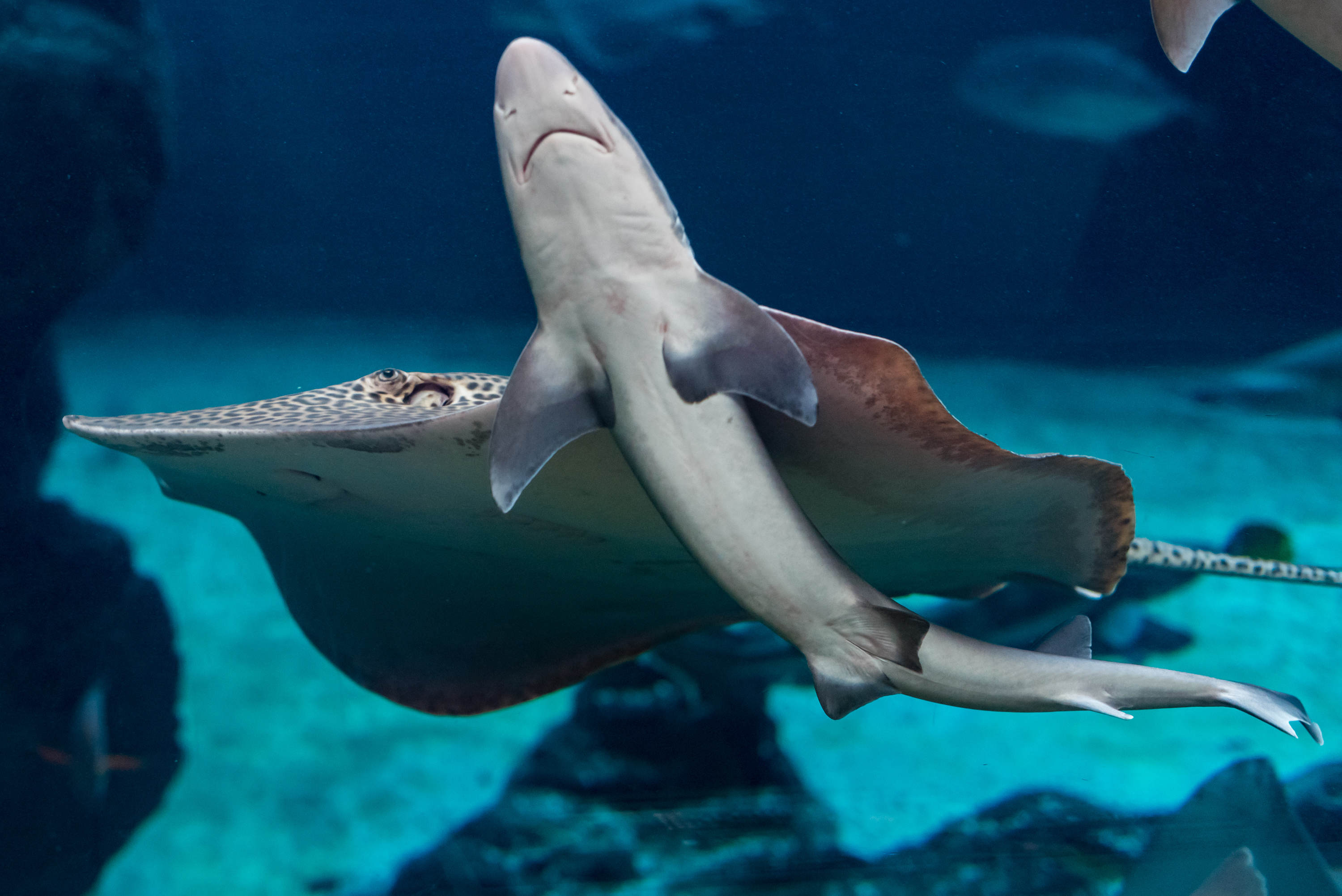
Banded houndshark and a Reticulate whipray at the Wave Tank

In 1987, the Kobe City Suma Aquarium was closed due to aging facilities, and a new building was constructed and renamed Suma Aqualife Park. The current facility was the pioneer of the many large aquariums that were to follow.

In 1987, the aquarium recorded 2.4 million annual visitors, a Japanese record until Tokyo Sea Life Park achieved 3.55 million in 1989.

On January 17, 1995, the Great Hanshin-Awaji Earthquake occurred, and the Aquarium was severely damaged. Although the buildings and aquarium tanks were spared from the damage of the earthquake, more than half of the animals kept in the aquarium were lost due to the severing of lifelines, such as power and water outages. For a while, the aquarium served as a shelter for the victims, but it was restored during that time and reopened on April 20, about three months after the disaster.

In July 2000, five years after the earthquake, the "Amazon Pavilion" was newly opened and the world's first tube-shaped tunnel aquarium was installed.

On January 5, 2022, construction of the Suma Aquarium and Seaside Park Redevelopment Project began. With the construction, only the main building was open for business, and the main building closed on May 31, 2023, closing all facilities.

Kobe City announced that it had decided to privatize Kobe Municipal Suma Seaside Aquarium and announced that it had made an informal offer to a group of seven companies, including Grand Vista Hotel & Resort, which operates Kamogawa Sea World.

== Facilities ==
=== Orca Stadium ===
The Blue Ocean Orca Stadium, a restaurant where visitors can dine while watching orcas through the aquarium windows, and the OrcaLab and Orca Hall, the world's first educational zone for orcas, will also be located in the museum.

=== Dolphin Stadium ===
The Dolphin Stadium introduces visitors to the speedy locomotion of dolphins, and the Dolphin Beach and Dolphin Hall, which are located next door, offer programs that allow visitors to interact directly with the dolphins.

=== Aqua Live ===
Aqua Live is a four-story structure with a fish exhibit area consisting of “Local Life,” which recreates the original landscape of the Rokko water system and the Seto Inland Sea through exhibits such as a giant eelgrass bed, and “Coral Life,” which takes visitors on a journey through the Pacific Ocean and coral reefs. The “Rocky Life” zone is home to California sea lions, sargassum seals, Magellanic penguins, sea turtles, and other creatures, while the “Jellyfish Life” zone allows visitors to appreciate the fantastic spectacle of jellyfish. In the “Suma Collection,” an area open to the general public free of charge, visitors can observe freshwater fish such as longnose gar, pirarucu, Russian sturgeon, paiyu, and Australian pond skaters.

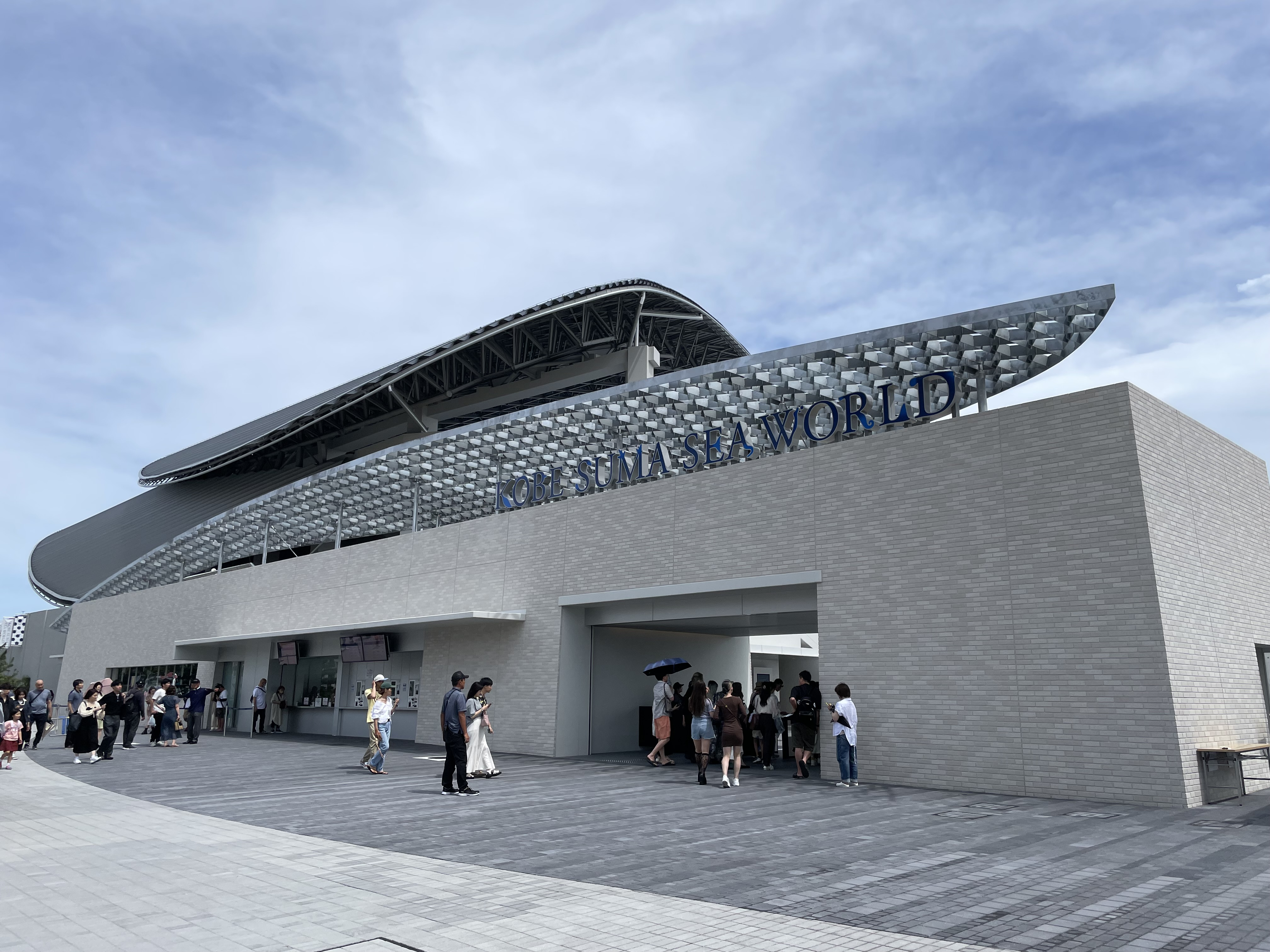
Entrance

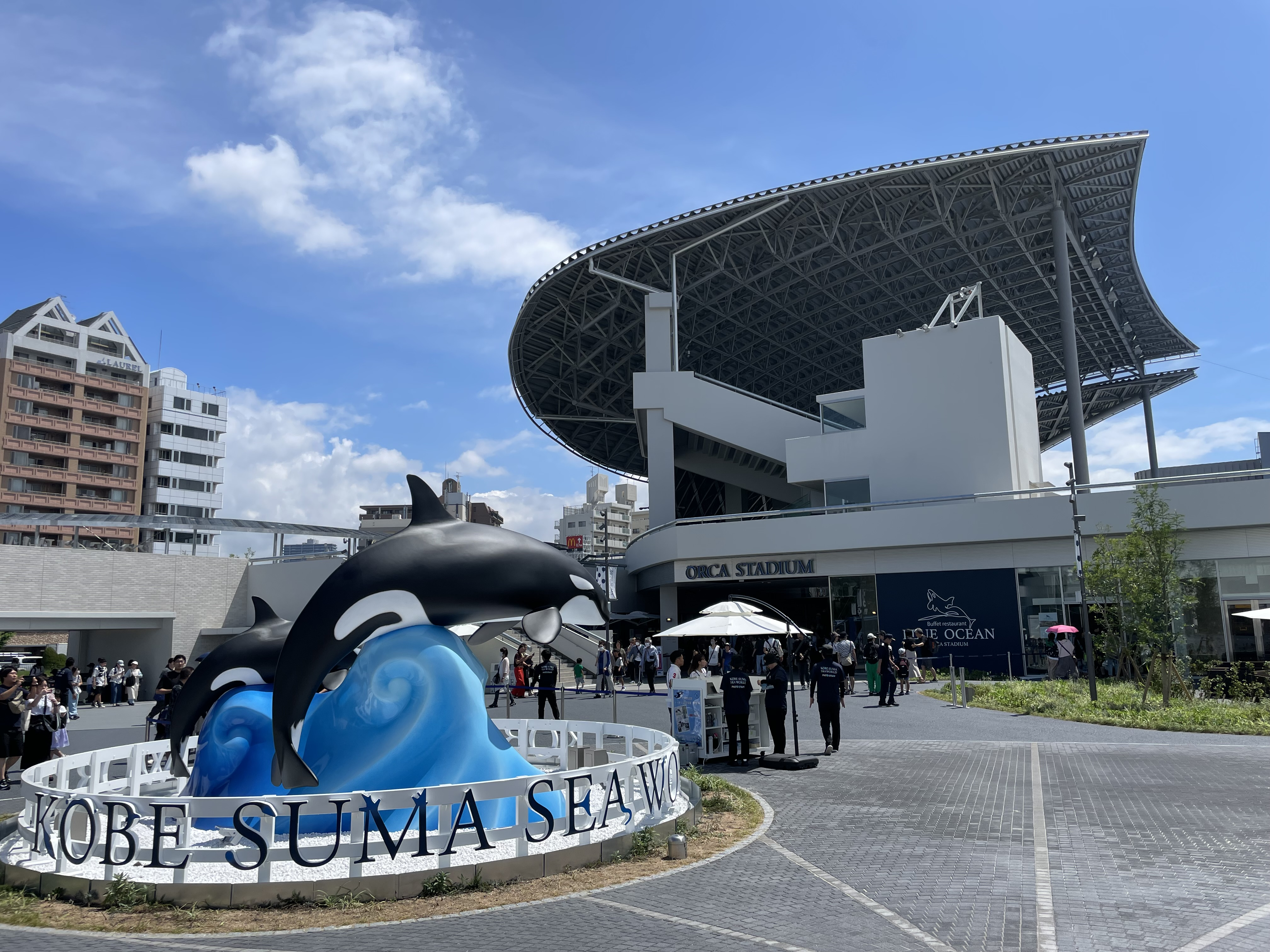
Orca Monument and Orca Studium

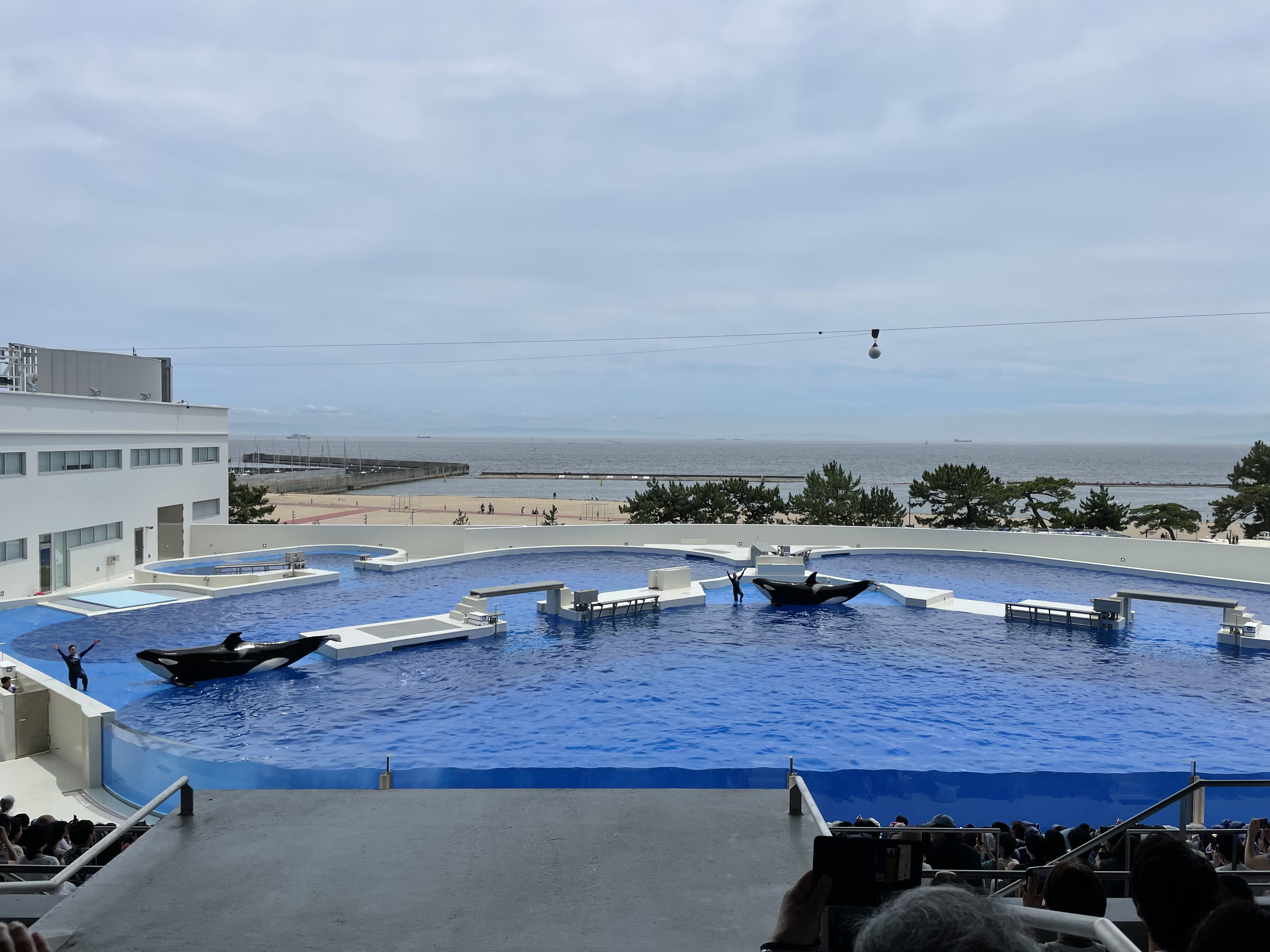
Orca performance at the Orca Stadium

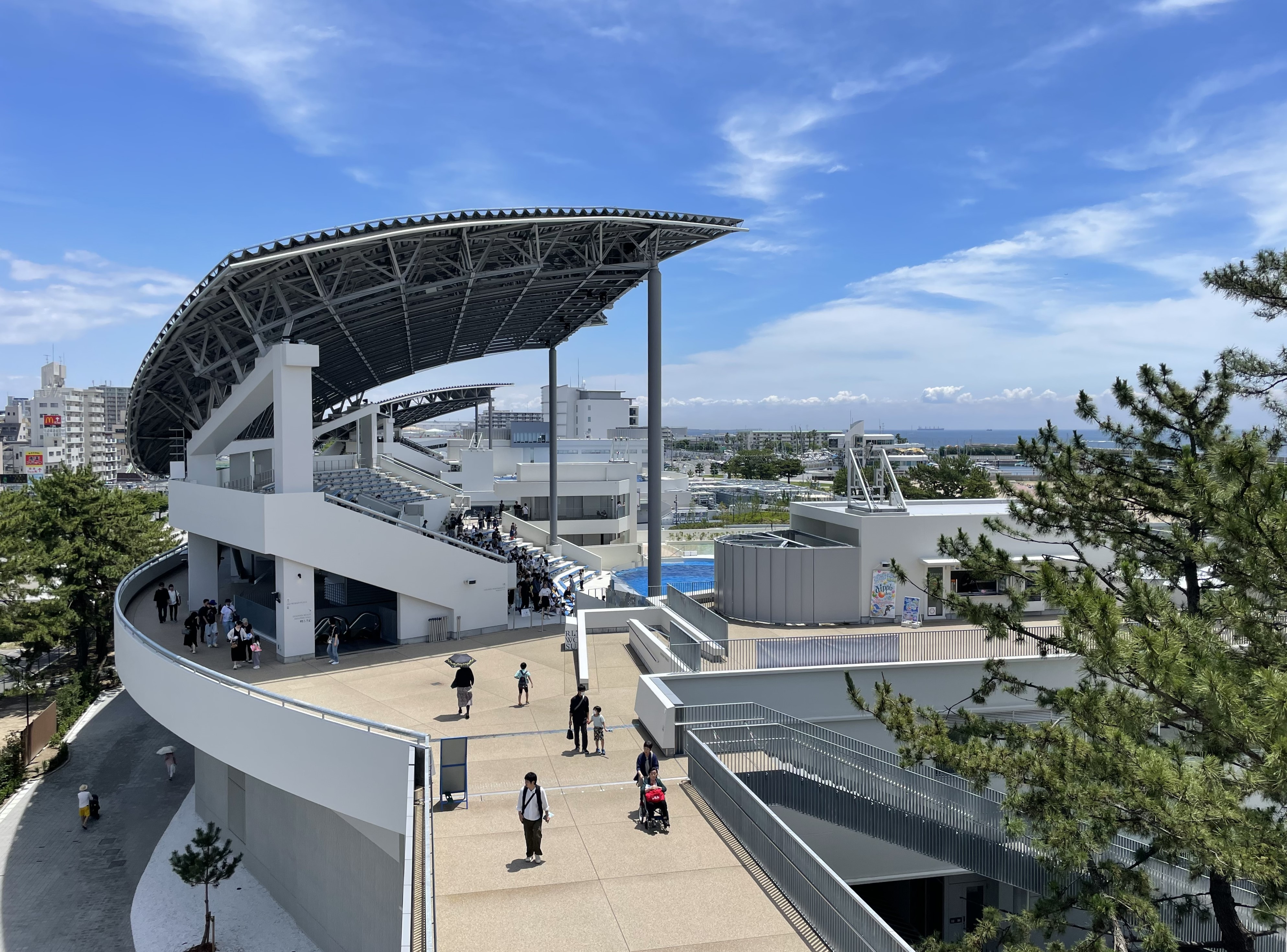
dolphin medium

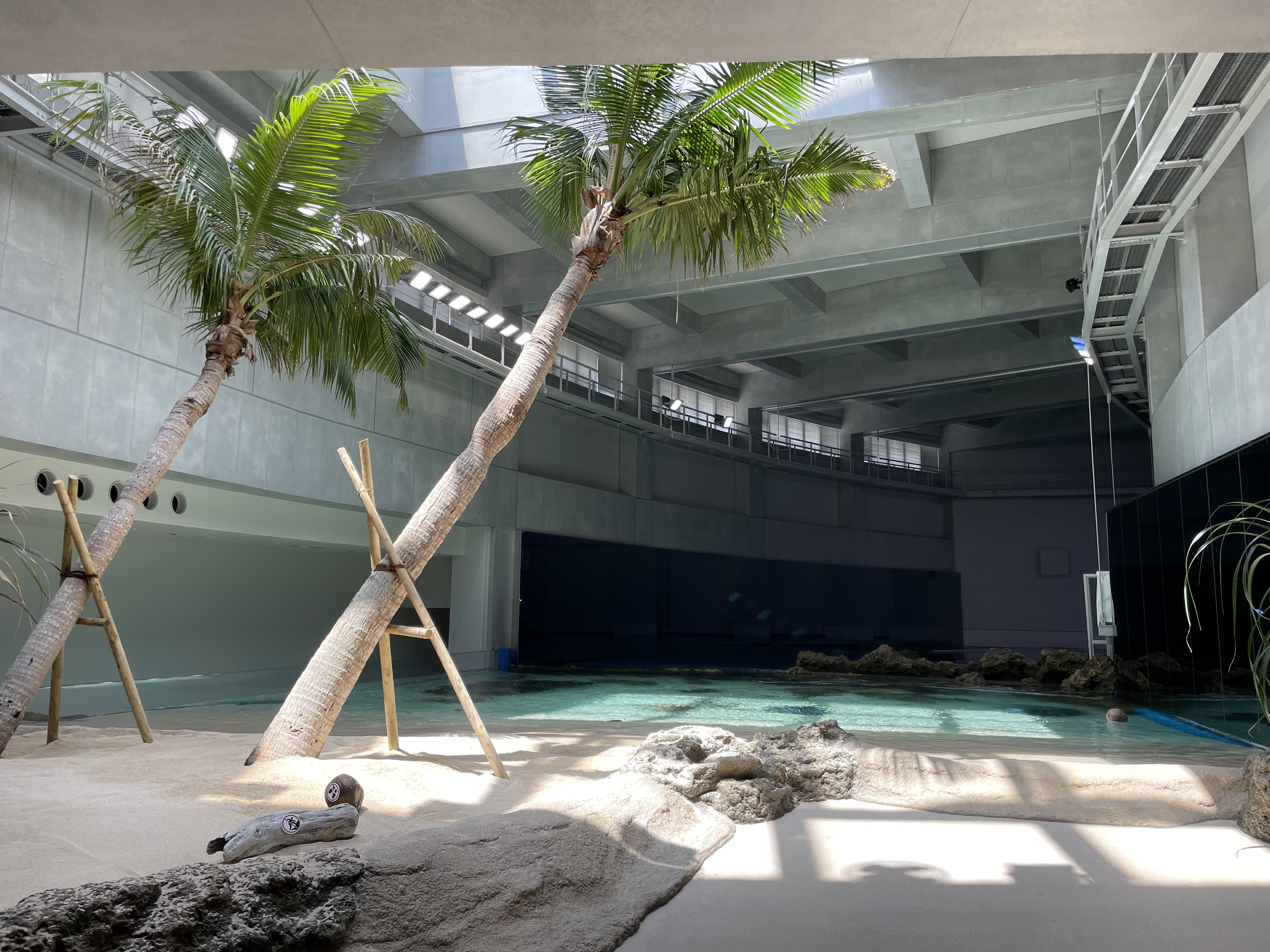
Aqua Live, Tropical Life beach

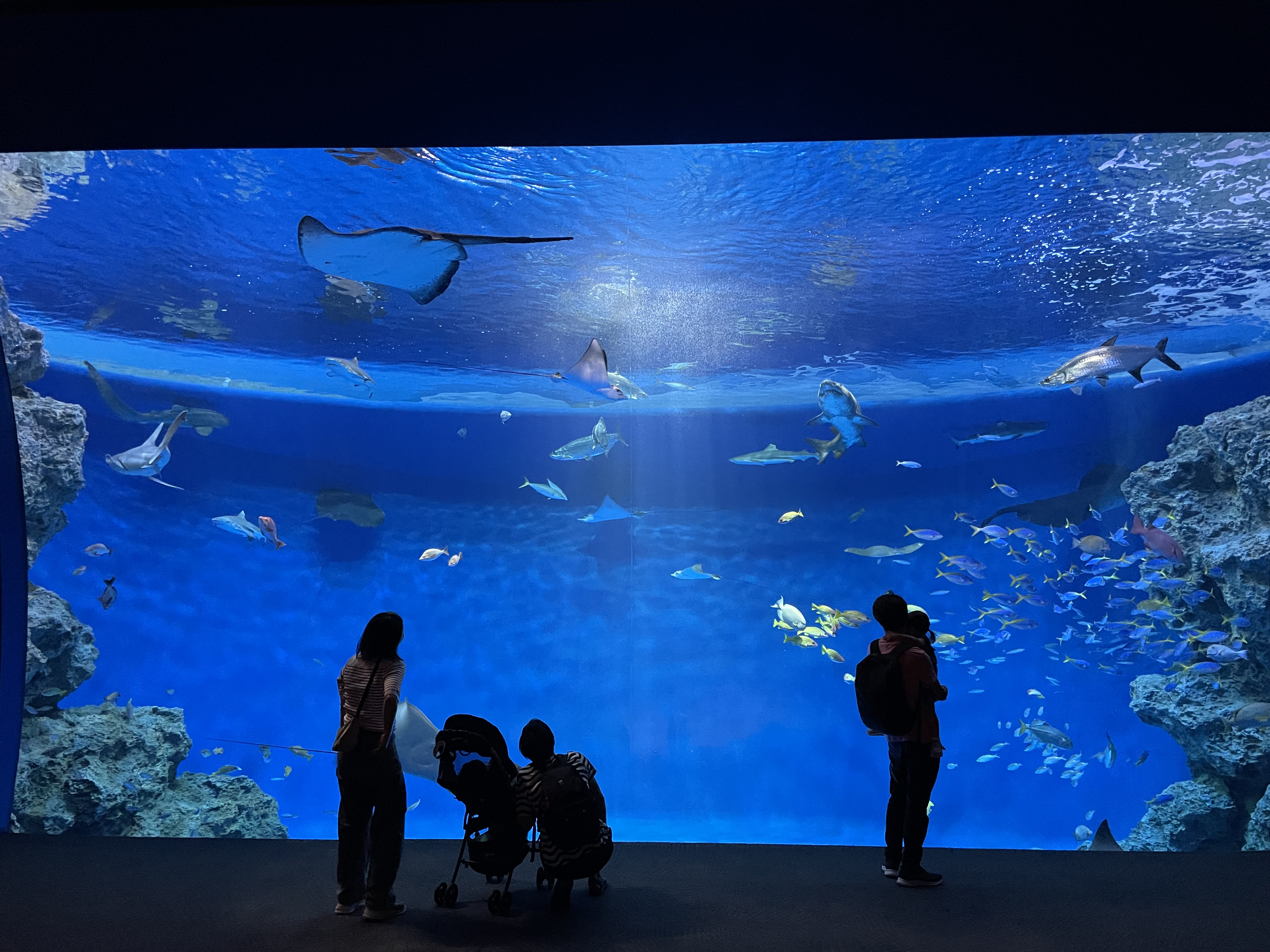
Aqua Live, Tropical Life Tank

== Kobe Suma Sea World Hotel ==
The hotel has a permanent Dolphin Lagoon, as well as premium rooms with a large aquarium tank and special rooms with a view bath overlooking the Seto Inland Sea.

== Orcas ==
On 29 March 2024, the first orca, Stella (F) was transferred to Kobe Suma Sea World from Port of Nagoya Public Aquarium. On 24 April 2024, Ran (F) was transferred to Kobe Suma Sea World from Kamogawa Sea World.

== See also ==
- Kamogawa Sea World
