= Fast =

Fast or FAST may refer to:

== Arts and entertainment ==
- "Fast" (Juice Wrld song), 2019
- "Fast" (Luke Bryan song), 2016
- "Fast" (Sueco song), 2019
- "Fast" (GloToven song), 2019
- Fast, an album by Custom, 2002
- Fast, a 2010 short film starring Charlyne Yi
- "Fast (Motion)", 2021 song by Saweetie
- Fast & Furious, an action franchise
- "Fast" (Demi Lovato song), 2025

== Astronomy and astrophysics ==
- Farpoint Asteroid Search Team, an asteroid search team located at the Farpoint Observatory
- Fast Auroral Snapshot Explorer, one in the series of NASA's Small Explorer spacecraft
- Five-hundred-meter Aperture Spherical Telescope, a large single-dish radio telescope in Guizhou province, China

== Biology ==
- to fast, to abstain from eating food with or not with concurrent abstention from drinking for a predetermined time period
- Fluorescence-activating and absorption-shifting tag, genetically encoded protein tag used in molecular biology

== Computing and software ==
- FAST protocol, an adaptation of the FIX protocol, optimized for streaming
- FAST TCP, a TCP congestion avoidance algorithm
- Facilitated Application Specification Techniques, a team-oriented approach for requirement gathering
- Fatigue Avoidance Scheduling Tool, software to develop work schedules
- Features from accelerated segment test, computer vision method for corner detection
- Feedback arc set in Tournaments, a computational problem in graph theory
- Fast (video game series), a video game series for Nintendo consoles developed by Shin'en Multimedia

== Government ==
- Faʻatuatua i le Atua Samoa ua Tasi (FAST), a political party in Samoa
- Fixing America's Surface Transportation Act, passed by the United States Congress
- Foreign-Deployed Advisory and Support Teams, a former program of the US Drug Enforcement Administration; see Drug Enforcement Administration § Special Response Teams
- Free and Secure Trade, a Canada-United States and Mexico-United States program to facilitate faster cross border trade

== Health and medicine ==
- FAST (stroke) (Face, Arm, Speech, and Time), a mnemonic for the symptoms of a stroke
- FAST (First Aid and Special Training) a first aid training organization founded by Ukrainian entrepreneur Fedir Serdiuk
- Focused assessment with sonography for trauma, an ultrasound used to examine the abdomen of a trauma patient
- Family System Test, or FAST, an evidence-based method for visualizing cohesion and hierarchy in systemic psychotherapy (e.g., Structural Family Therapy)

== Military ==
- Fleet Antiterrorism Security Team, a unit of the United States Marine Corps
- Fuel And Sensor Tactical packs, a type of conformal fuel tank developed for the F-15
- Future Assault Shell Technology helmet, an American combat helmet

== Organizations ==
- FAST Multimedia AG, former company located in Munich; vendor of graphics boards, video frame grabbers and video processing software; later consumed by Pinnacle Systems
- FAST and later as Fast Search & Transfer, a Norwegian company focusing on data search technologies
- Farnborough Air Sciences Trust, an aviation museum
- Federation Against Software Theft, a UK organization that pursues those who illegally distribute software
- Financial Alliance for Sustainable Trade
- Firefighter assist and search team, a team of firefighters dedicated to the rescue of other firefighters
- Fulbright Academy of Science & Technology

== People ==
=== People with the given name ===
- Fast Robinson (born 1994), English actor known professionally as Eddie-Joe Robinson

=== People with the surname ===
- Alexia Fast (born 1992), Canadian actress
- Brad Fast (born 1980), Canadian ice hockey player
- Christian Fast (1762–1841), American soldier and pioneer
- Herman Becker Fast (1887–1945), American businessman, farmer, and politician
- Howard Fast (1914–2003), American novelist and television writer
- Jesper Fast (born 1991), Swedish ice hockey player
- Jonathan Fast (born 1948), American author, son of Howard Fast
- Julius Fast (1919–2008), American author, brother of Howard Fast
- Matt Fast, lead singer of the Canadian punk band The Undecided
- Molly Jong-Fast (born 1978), American author, daughter of Jonathan Fast
- Piotr Fast (born 1951), Polish professor and translator
- Renata Fast (born 1994), Canadian ice hockey player

=== People with the nickname ===
- Brian Leiser (born 1972), nicknamed "Fast", musician, member of the band Fun Lovin' Criminals
- Fast Eddie (disambiguation)

== Other uses ==
- Faceted Application of Subject Terminology, a thesaurus of subject headings
- Fairfield and Suisun Transit
- Fast food, food type with fast service or delivery to the customer
- Fast Action Stunt Team (F.A.S.T.), a fictional organization from the TV show Turbo Fast
- Fourier amplitude sensitivity testing, in mathematics, a variance-based global sensitivity analysis method
- Future Attribute Screening Technology, a method of detection indicating the probability of intent to commit a future crime
- Fast Product, a record label
- Fifteen and Send Time, a type of dog agility competition
- Free ad-supported streaming television
- USENIX Conference on File and Storage Technologies

== See also ==
- Nacional Fast Clube, a Brazilian football club
- Fast bowling, a practice in cricket
- Fast Company (disambiguation)
- Faster (disambiguation)
