= Faster =

Faster or FASTER may refer to:

== Music ==
- "Faster" (George Harrison song)
- "Faster" (Matt Nathanson song)
- "Faster" (Within Temptation song)
- "Faster" (Manic Street Preachers song), a double A-side single by Manic Street Preachers
- "Faster", a song by NCT 127 from 2 Baddies (2022)
- "Faster", a song by Third Eye Blind from the 2003 album Out of the Vein
- "Faster", a song by Janelle Monáe from the album The ArchAndroid

== Film ==
- Faster (2003 film), a 2003 documentary film about MotoGP
- Faster (2010 film), a 2010 feature film

== Other ==
- Someone engaged in fasting
- Isuzu Faster, a model of pick-up truck
- FASTER, stock trading and financial settlement system of New Zealand's Exchange (NZX)
- FASTER (software), a transactional processing system for IBM mainframes
- FASTER (cable system), a trans-Pacific submarine communications cable linking Oregon to Japan and Taiwan
- FASTER (ESA payload), Facility for Adsorption and Surface Tension; see European Drawer Rack
- FASTER, the Food Allergy Safety, Treatment, Education, and Research Act, see Food Allergen Labeling and Consumer Protection Act
- "Faster" (Star Wars: The Bad Batch)

== See also ==
- Fast (disambiguation)
- Fastest
