= Kansas Lake Evangelical Lutheran Church =

Kansas Lake Lutheran Church
- Kansas Lake Evangelical Lutheran Church
- KLLC post 1951 remodeling
- Kansas Lake Lutheran Church
- 43°54′22″N 94°43′31″W
- Location: Butterfield, Minnesota
- Country: United States
- Denomination: Evangelical Lutheran

History
- Former name: Svenska Evangeliskt-Lutherska Kansas Lake Forsamlingen (The Swedish Evangelical Lutheran Kansas Lake Congregation)
- Founded: December 2, 1871

Architecture
- Functional status: closed

Kansas Lake Evangelical Lutheran Church was a small, rural church located near Butterfield, Minnesota, United States. Formed in 1871 by Swedish-Americans settling in the area, the church served the local population for 138 years before closing in 2009.

== History ==
When founded, the church was affiliated with the Swedish Evangelical Lutheran Augustana Synod in North America. It went on to be a member of successive church bodies. These included the Evangelical Lutheran Augustana Synod in North America, the Augustana Evangelical Lutheran Church, the Lutheran Church in America, and finally the Evangelical Lutheran Church in America. Upon the formation of a formal congregation, members adopted the Augustana Synod's constitution for congregations.

== Buildings ==
The Kansas Lake Church was housed in many different buildings throughout its history. The first church was built by Johannes Nelson in 1871 and was approximately 32 x 22 feet. However, after 18 years in the original structure, the congregation outgrew it and in 1889 moved to their new church. The new church was built in the style of churches found in Sweden and much larger than the first. It was "an inspiration to those who worshiped in it." Unfortunately, tragedy came upon the new church, and in 1904, lightning struck the building and burned it to the ground.

== Church groups ==
The Kansas Lake Lutheran Church had many different active church groups throughout its history. Among these were the Junior Missionary Society, Luther League, Willing Workers, Christeens, Ladies Aid, Dorcas Society, Lutheran Church Women, and Family Night.

== Closing ==
In 2008, a vote of council members was taken "on the future of the congregation," and it was determined with a vote of 19-2 to "close with honor."
