= Tim Tebow =

American football and baseball player (born 1987)

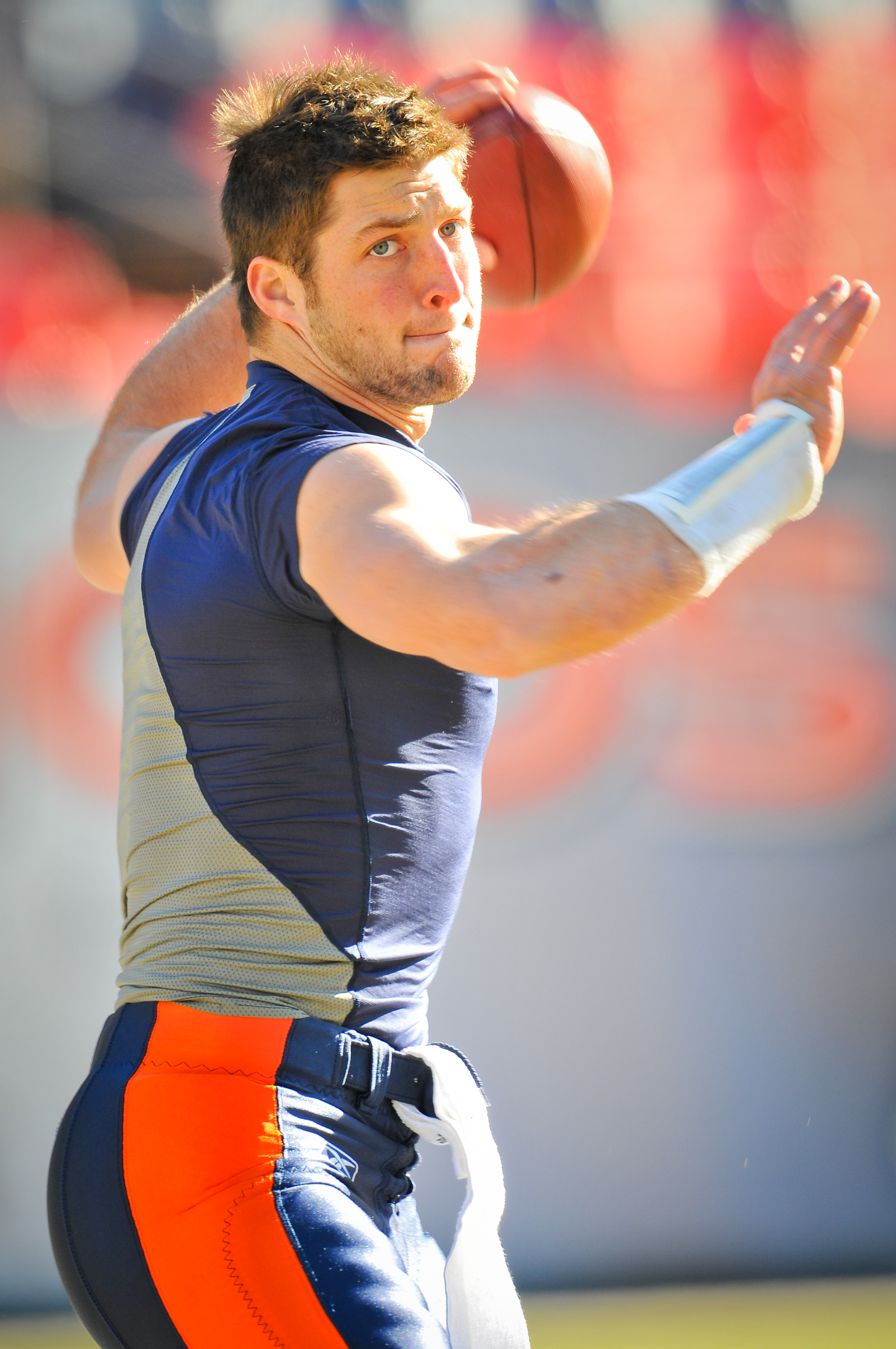
- Tebow with the Denver Broncos in 2012

No. 15
- Position: Quarterback

Personal information
- Born: August 14, 1987 (age 39); Makati, Philippines
- Listed height: 6 ft 3 in (1.91 m)
- Listed weight: 236 lb (107 kg)

Career information
- High school: Nease (Ponte Vedra Beach, Florida, U.S.)
- College: Florida (2006–2009)
- NFL draft: 2010: 1st round, 25th overall pick

Career history
- Denver Broncos (2010–2011); New York Jets (2012); New England Patriots (2013)*; Philadelphia Eagles (2015)*; Jacksonville Jaguars (2021)*
- * Offseason or practice squad member only

Awards and highlights
- 2× BCS national champion (2006, 2008); BCS National Championship Game MVP (2008); Heisman Trophy (2007); Consensus All-American (2007); First-team All-American (2008); Second-team All-American (2009); 2× SEC Male Athlete of the Year (2008, 2009); Florida Football Ring of Honor (2018); First-team AP All-Time All-American (2025)

Career NFL statistics
- Passing attempts: 361
- Passing completions: 173
- Completion percentage: 47.9%
- TD–INT: 17–9
- Passing yards: 2,422
- Passer rating: 75.3
- Rushing yards: 989
- Rushing touchdowns: 12
- Stats at Pro Football Reference
- College Football Hall of Fame

Timothy Richard Tebow (/ˈtiːboʊ/; born August 14, 1987) is an American former professional football quarterback who played in the National Football League (NFL) for three seasons, primarily with the Denver Broncos. Tebow played college football for the Florida Gators, becoming the first underclassman to win the Heisman Trophy and leading the team to two BCS National Championship titles in 2006 and 2008. At the conclusion of his collegiate career, Tebow held the Southeastern Conference's records for career passing efficiency and rushing touchdowns. He was selected by the Broncos in the first round of the 2010 NFL draft.

Tebow became the Broncos' starter during the 2011 season and revitalized a struggling team, bringing them to the franchise's first division title and playoff victory since 2005. His frequent comeback victories and outspoken Christian faith made him a cultural phenomenon, with his habit of dropping to one knee in prayer on the field becoming known as "Tebowing". Due to questions over Tebow's potential as an NFL quarterback, he was traded after the season to the New York Jets, where he spent one year as a backup.

After failing to make the roster of the New England Patriots and Philadelphia Eagles, Tebow pursued a minor league baseball career with the New York Mets organization from 2016 to 2021. The same year he retired from baseball, he returned to the NFL as a tight end for the Jacksonville Jaguars, but was released after one preseason game. Since 2017, he has been a regular contributor and co-host for college football programming on SEC Network and ESPN. Tebow was inducted in the College Football Hall of Fame in 2023.

== Early life ==
Timothy Richard Tebow was born in the Philippines to American parents. In the late 1960s, Tebow's parents – Pamela Elaine (née Pemberton) and Robert Ramsey Tebow II (1948–2026) – met while attending the University of Florida. During that time, his mother was a freshman and his father was a sophomore. The couple married on June 12, 1971, before Pamela's graduation from the university. In 1985, the family moved to the Philippines where they served as Baptist missionaries and built a ministry. During the Tebows' stay, Pamela contracted amoebic dysentery and fell into a coma. While recovering, she discovered that she was pregnant. The medications used to treat Pamela caused a severe placental abruption. Doctors expected a stillbirth and recommended an abortion, which was illegal in the Philippines even in severe cases; the Tebows decided against it. On August 14, 1987, Pamela Tebow gave birth to Tim Tebow in Manila. When Tim was three years old, his family moved from the Philippines to Jacksonville, Florida.

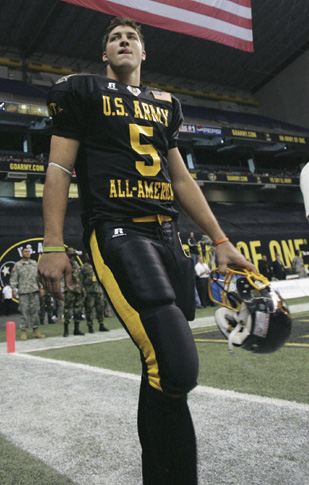
Tebow at the 2006 U.S. Army All-American Bowl

Tebow is the youngest of five children. The Tebow family name is of Belgian (Walloon) origin. He is a descendant of Andries Tebow, who sailed to America from Bruges in the 1680s. He and his siblings were all homeschooled by their parents, who instilled the family's Christian beliefs. Tebow is dyslexic and believes in his uniqueness as a gift from God. He began his high school football career as a tight end for Trinity Christian Academy in Jacksonville. Before the 2003 season, he moved to nearby St. Johns County, making him eligible to play for the struggling football program at Allen D. Nease High School where he could play quarterback. He never enrolled at either school, however: his parents chose to home-school him. Florida law allows homeschooled students to participate on the team of the local high school in the school district in which they live, and private schools such as Trinity Christian Academy are also allowed to let homeschooled students play on their teams.

Tebow came to national prominence as a junior at Nease, known for his running and throwing abilities, as well as an intense competitiveness. Later that year, he suffered an injury to his right leg late in the first half of a game. At first believed to be suffering from a bad cramp, he actually played the entire second half with a broken fibula, at one point rushing for a 29-yard touchdown. After the game the extent of the injury was discovered and he was held out for the remainder of his junior season. Nevertheless, he was named Florida's Player of the Year and became a major college football quarterback prospect.

During his senior season, he led the Nease Panthers to a state title, earned All-State honors, was named Florida's Mr. Football and a Parade magazine high school All-American, and repeated as Florida's Player of the Year. He played in the U.S. Army All-American Bowl in San Antonio, Texas which featured the top 78 senior high school football players in the nation and was shown nationally on NBC television.

Tebow was the subject of an ESPN Faces in Sports documentary. The segment was titled "Tim Tebow: The Chosen One", and focused on Tebow's home schooling and missionary work in the Philippines, his athletic exploits, and the college recruiting process. Tebow was also featured in Sports Illustrated on the "Faces in the Crowd" page. In 2007, he was named to the Florida State Athletic Association's All-Century Team that listed the Top 33 football players in the state of Florida's 100-year history of high school football. Despite family ties to the University of Florida, where his parents met as students, Tebow considered other schools, including the University of Alabama.

=== Homeschooling ===
On January 7, 2007, Tebow was featured prominently in an ESPN Outside The Lines feature on home-schooled athletes seeking equal access to high school athletics in other states. Because a home-schooler's access to public and private school athletic functions varies by state, Tebow and former defensive end Jason Taylor (who was allowed to play at his local high school in Pennsylvania) argued in favor of extending the right to play for local teams to more states. Upon becoming the first home-schooled athlete to be nominated for the Heisman Trophy, he remarked, "That's really cool. A lot of times people have this stereotype of home-schoolers as not very athletic – it's like, go win a spelling bee or something like that – it's an honor for me to be the first one to do that." Tebow received the 2008 Quaqua Protégé Award as outstanding home-education graduate.

== College football career ==
Tebow was heavily recruited by many college programs and almost accepted a scholarship offer from Mike Shula, then coach at Alabama. Instead, he chose to attend the University of Florida and play for coach Urban Meyer's Florida Gators. He was a key backup on Florida's 2006 national championship team, won the starting quarterback job and the Heisman Trophy in 2007, led the Gators to another BCS championship in 2008, and quarterbacked them to a 13–1 season in 2009. He served as team captain in 2008 and 2009, and he is the only three-time recipient of the Florida's most valuable player award, having been chosen by his teammates in 2007, 2008, and 2009.

=== 2006 season ===
Despite a strong showing in his first inter-squad scrimmage, head coach Urban Meyer named Tebow second-string behind Chris Leak. A backup throughout the season, Tebow was a significant contributor to the Gators' 2006 success. He made his college debut coming off the bench in a goal line situation against Southern Miss. He rushed for a touchdown on a designed quarterback scramble on his first play. In his next game, he led the team in rushing yards against UCF.

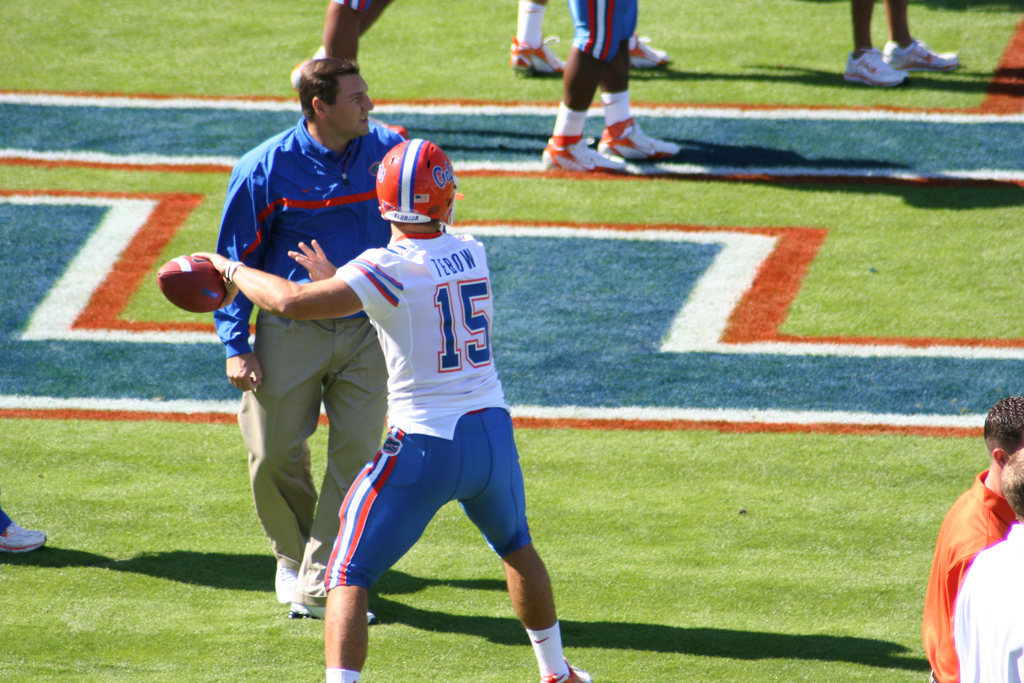
Tebow warming up

Tebow's biggest game in the season came against LSU on October 7, where he accounted for all three of the Gators' touchdowns, passing for two and rushing for another. Tebow played a role in the Gators' victory in the 2007 BCS National Championship Game against Ohio State. He threw for one touchdown and rushed for another, finishing with 39 rushing yards. He finished 2006 with the second-most rushing yards on the Gator team.

=== 2007 season ===
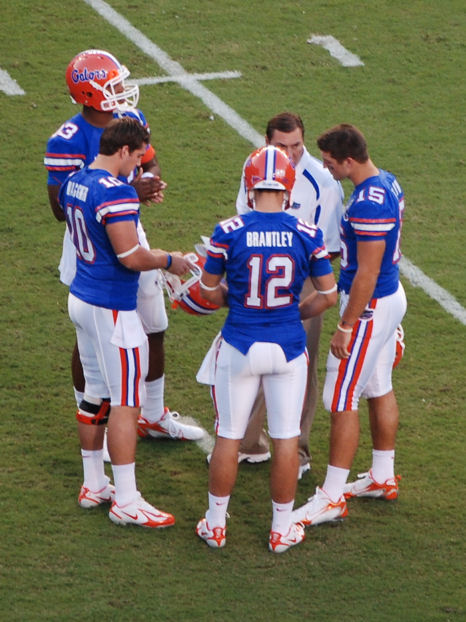
Tebow (on right, #15), Cam Newton (on far left, #13) and other Gator QBs during pre-game warm-ups

Although questions about his passing skill loomed, Tebow was named the Florida Gators starting quarterback for the 2007 season. He opened the year 13-of-17 for 300 yards and three touchdowns in his starting debut against Western Kentucky. Tebow finished the regular season with the second highest passing efficiency in the nation with 177.8. Additionally, he averaged 4.3 yards per carry on the ground.

Tebow set numerous personal, school, and national records in the 2007 season, including:

- University of Florida single-game quarterback rushing yards, 166, week 4
- SEC season rushing touchdown record, 20
- Career high single-game rushing touchdowns, 5, November 10
- SEC season total touchdowns (passing and rushing), 55

On November 24, against Florida State, Tebow threw for three touchdowns and rushed for two in a 45–12 rout of the Seminoles. It was later revealed that Tebow fractured his right hand during the third quarter but played the rest of the game. He had to wear a cast for the next three weeks. He led the SEC in pass completion percentage and rushing touchdowns.

After the 2007 season, Tebow was recognized as a first-team All-SEC selection and a consensus first-team All-American. He won the Heisman Trophy, given to the most outstanding college football player of the year. Tebow also received the Davey O'Brien Award, annually given to the best quarterback in the nation, on February 18 in Fort Worth, Texas. In addition, he won the Maxwell Award and AP Player of the Year.

==== Heisman Trophy ====
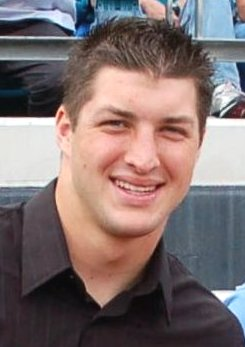
Tebow in 2007

On December 8, 2007, Tebow was awarded the Heisman Trophy, finishing ahead of Arkansas's Darren McFadden, Hawaii's Colt Brennan, and Missouri's Chase Daniel. He was the first sophomore to win the Heisman Trophy. He garnered 462 first-place votes and 1,957 points, 254 points ahead of the runner-up, Arkansas running back Darren McFadden. He finished the regular season as the only player in FBS history to rush and pass for at least 20 touchdowns in both categories in the same season. He had 32 passing touchdowns, 23 rushing touchdowns, and became the third Florida player to win the Heisman Trophy, joining Steve Spurrier and Danny Wuerffel.

2007 Heisman Trophy Finalist Voting
Finalist	First place votes (3 pts. each)	Second place votes (2 pts. each)	Third place votes (1 pt. each)	Total points
Tim Tebow	462	229	113	1,957
Darren McFadden	291	355	120	1,703
Colt Brennan	54	114	242	632

=== 2008 season ===
Before the 2007 season had even come to a close, Florida coach Urban Meyer stated that he would likely use two quarterbacks during the 2008 season to take some of the workload off of Tebow's shoulders. Tebow led the Gators in rushing in 2007 but also had to play through a bruised shoulder and broken non-throwing hand. Before the 2008 season even started, Tebow had his name pulled from consideration for the Playboy Preseason All-American team because it conflicted with his Christian beliefs.

On September 27, 2008, in the fourth week of the season, the undefeated No. 4 Gators lost to unranked Ole Miss at home, despite being 22-point favorites. After the game, Tebow delivered a speech to the media, later known as "The Promise" and later regarded as one of the most iconic speeches in college football history. In this speech, Tebow apologized for the loss and promised he and the team would do better. He would keep good on this promise, as the Gators would not lose another game for the rest of the season.

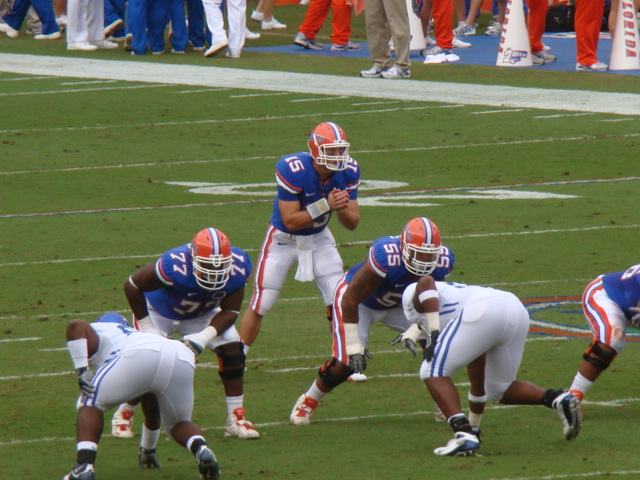
Tebow pictured snapping the ball

On November 1, 2008, playing against Georgia, Tebow ran for his 37th rushing touchdown, breaking the school record previously held by former Florida running back Emmitt Smith. Tebow helped lead the Gators to a 12–1 record in 2008. After clinching the SEC East title, the team played for and won the SEC title in the 2008 SEC Championship Game against Alabama. The win secured the #2 ranking in the final BCS standings, which earned the Gators the chance to play #1 ranked Oklahoma in the 2009 BCS National Championship Game, which they won 24–14. He led the SEC in pass completion percentage and passing touchdowns.

Tebow finished third in the 2008 Heisman Trophy voting, with Oklahoma quarterback Sam Bradford taking the top spot followed by Texas quarterback Colt McCoy, despite Tebow receiving the most first-place votes. He won the Maxwell Award in 2008, only the second player to ever win the award twice. He won the Manning Award, Maxwell Award, and SEC Offensive Player of the Year.

On January 11, 2009, at a national championship celebration held at Ben Hill Griffin Stadium, Tebow announced that he would not make himself eligible for the 2009 NFL draft, but would instead return for his senior season at Florida. A day later, he had surgery on his right shoulder to remove a bone spur in an effort to reduce chronic inflammation.

2008 Heisman Trophy Finalist Voting
Finalist	First place votes (3 pts. each)	Second place votes (2 pts. each)	Third place votes (1 pt. each)	Total points
Sam Bradford	300	315	196	1,726
Colt McCoy	266	288	230	1,604
Tim Tebow	309	207	234	1,575

=== 2009 season ===
Tebow opened the 2009 season continuing a streak of throwing and running for a touchdown in blowout wins over Charleston Southern and Troy. He ran for a touchdown in the third game, a win against Tennessee, but failed to throw for a touchdown for the first time since his freshman season. In answer to an interview question, Tebow stated he was a virgin. The statement was subject to much discussion about whether the question was necessary, including criticism of the reporter who originally asked.

Tebow started against Kentucky despite suffering from a respiratory illness and taking two bags of intravenous fluids before the game. He ran for two touchdowns to put him in 2nd place on the all-time SEC touchdown list and he also threw for a touchdown. Late in the third quarter, he was hit in the chest by Kentucky defensive end Taylor Wyndham, fell backwards, and hit the back of his head on the knee of Florida tackle Marcus Gilbert. He lay motionless for several minutes before being helped to the sidelines, where he appeared to vomit. He was taken by ambulance to the University of Kentucky Chandler Medical Center. A CT scan showed no bleeding in the brain, with the injury described as a mild concussion. Coach Urban Meyer stayed the night in the hospital with Tebow, who was discharged in the morning. Coincidentally, Florida did not have a game scheduled for the following Saturday, and Tebow was cleared to play in the Gators' next contest at LSU on October 10, two weeks after the incident.

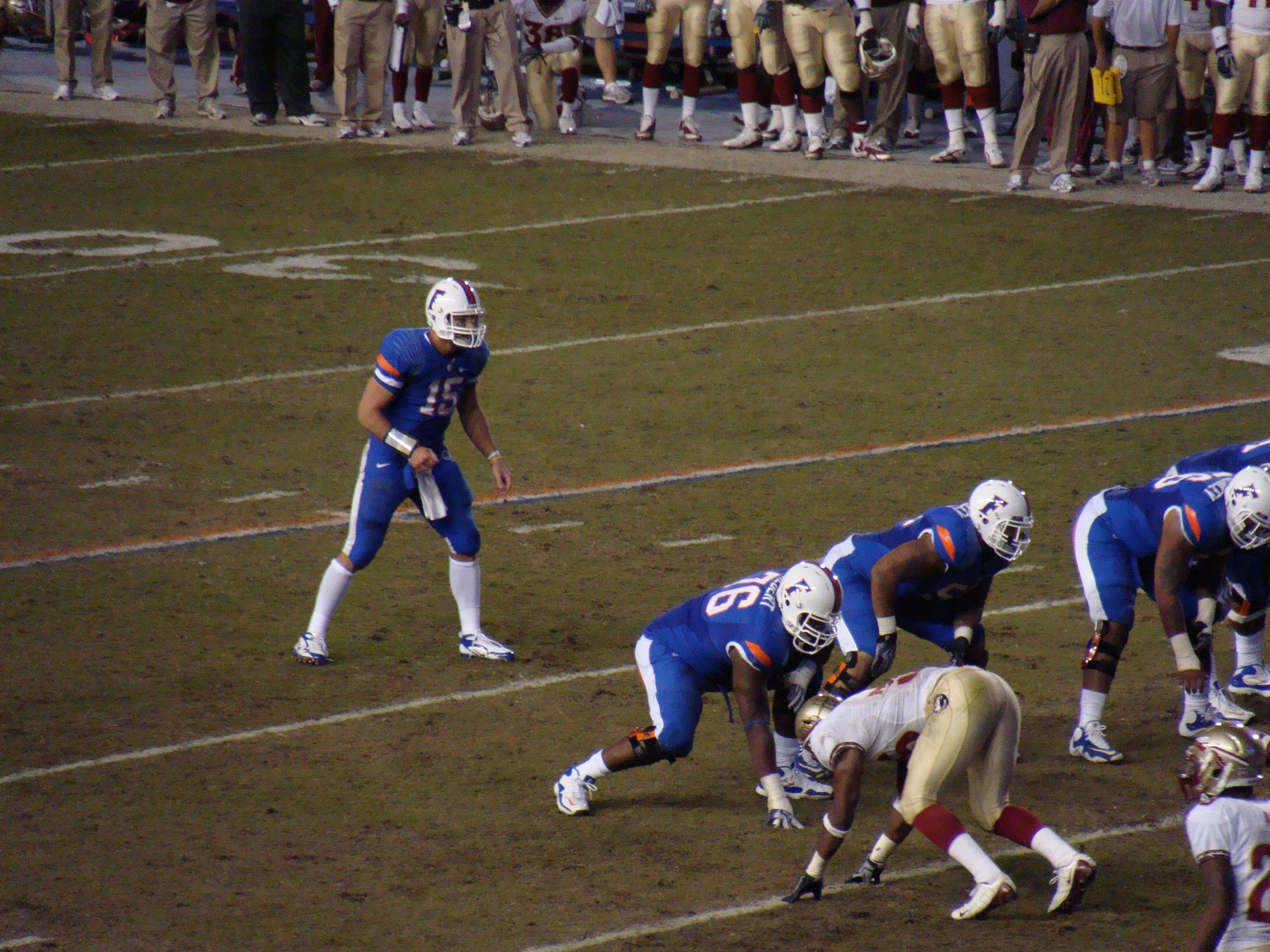
Tebow playing against the Florida State Seminoles in 2009

On October 31, 2009, while playing against Georgia, Tebow ran for his 50th and 51st rushing touchdowns, breaking the SEC career record previously held by former Georgia running back Herschel Walker. His penultimate collegiate game, the 2009 SEC Championship, saw him once again facing the University of Alabama. Tebow threw for 245 yards and a touchdown and led the team with 63 yards rushing, but the Gators fell 32–13 and lost their chance to play for a second consecutive national title. Florida beat Cincinnati 51–24 in the 2010 Sugar Bowl the following January. In what was Tebow's last college game, he completed 31-of-35 passes for 482 yards and three touchdowns and accounted for four total touchdowns and 533 yards of total offense, which set a record for a Bowl Championship Series game. He graduated from the University of Florida in December 2009.

At the end of his college career, Tebow held five National Collegiate Athletic Association (NCAA), 14 Southeastern Conference (SEC), and 28 University of Florida statistical records. He was the SEC's all-time leader in career passing efficiency (170.8), completion percentage (67.1%), passing touchdown to interception ratio (5.5 to 1), rushing yards by a quarterback (2,947), rushing touchdowns (any position) (57), and total touchdowns responsible for (145). Among many mentions in the NCAA Division-I record book, Tebow is ranked second in career passing efficiency, third in career yards per attempt (9.33), 8th in career rushing touchdowns, and also owns the record for most consecutive games in which he both threw at least one touchdown pass and scored at least one rushing touchdown (14).

=== "The Tebow Rule" ===
In 2010, a new rule for the next NCAA football season banned messages on eye paint. This rule was dubbed "The Tebow Rule" by media.

During his college football career, Tebow frequently wore references to biblical verses on his eye black. In the 2009 BCS Championship Game, he wore John 3:16 on his eye black; the verse was the highest-ranked Google search term over the next 24 hours, generating over 90 million searches. Additionally, later, when Tebow switched to another verse, there were 3.43 million searches of "Tim Tebow" and "Proverbs 3:5–6" together. Tebow stated of the searches "It just goes to show you the influence and the platform that you have as a student-athlete and as a quarterback at Florida".

Despite the media labeling it as the Tebow rule, the NCAA denies the rule was influenced by Tebow in particular, since many other notable players (Reggie Bush and Terrelle Pryor for example) wore messages on eye black. An NCAA spokesman said: "When this rule was proposed, the committee did not focus on any one team or student athlete. That measure reinforces what the intended use of eye black is, which is to shade the eyes from the sun."

The NFL already had a rule prohibiting players from wearing messages on eye black dating back to Jim McMahon's time with the Chicago Bears, so Tebow could not have continued the practice in the NFL.

== Professional football career ==
=== Pre-draft ===
After passing on the 2009 NFL draft for his senior season at Florida, Tebow went on to enter the 2010 NFL draft. Despite his college success, Tebow's NFL potential was much debated. At the time, Jon Gruden said Tebow was "the strongest human being that's ever played the position" and "is the kind of guy who could revolutionize the game". Former Indianapolis Colts coach Tony Dungy said he would pick Tebow with a top 10 pick over any quarterback in the 2010 Draft. However, NFL analyst Mel Kiper Jr. believed Tebow did not have the intangibles to play quarterback in the NFL. "I don't think he can be a fulltime quarterback. I don't think he can be the quarterback of the future for you, but I do think in the third round, maybe the second round, he'll be the same as Pat White", said Kiper.

Tebow was particularly mentioned as a potential third-round pick of the Jacksonville Jaguars, his hometown team. Some, including Florida governor Charlie Crist, suggested that Tebow could be the remedy for dwindling Jaguars ticket sales at EverBank Field.

Early in the 2009 season, Jaguars owner Wayne Weaver stated: "He (Tebow) clearly is an outstanding football player and would be an asset to any football organization. Clearly there's going to be a groundswell for Tebow, and we'll have to make that evaluation if we have a draft pick that's going to be anywhere near him." Not everyone in the organization agreed, as Jaguar lineman Uche Nwaneri posted doubts about Tebow's potential NFL success on his team's website message board.

Pre-draft measurables
Height	Weight	Arm length	Hand span	40-yard dash	10-yard split	20-yard split	20-yard shuttle	Three-cone drill	Vertical jump	Broad jump	Wonderlic
6 ft 2 3/4 in (1.90 m)	236 lb (107 kg)	31 3/4 in (0.81 m)	10 1/8 in (0.26 m)	4.72 s	1.55 s	2.66 s	4.17 s	6.66 s	38 1/2 in (0.98 m)	9 ft 7 in (2.92 m)	22
All values from NFL Scouting Combine.

=== Denver Broncos ===
==== 2010 season ====
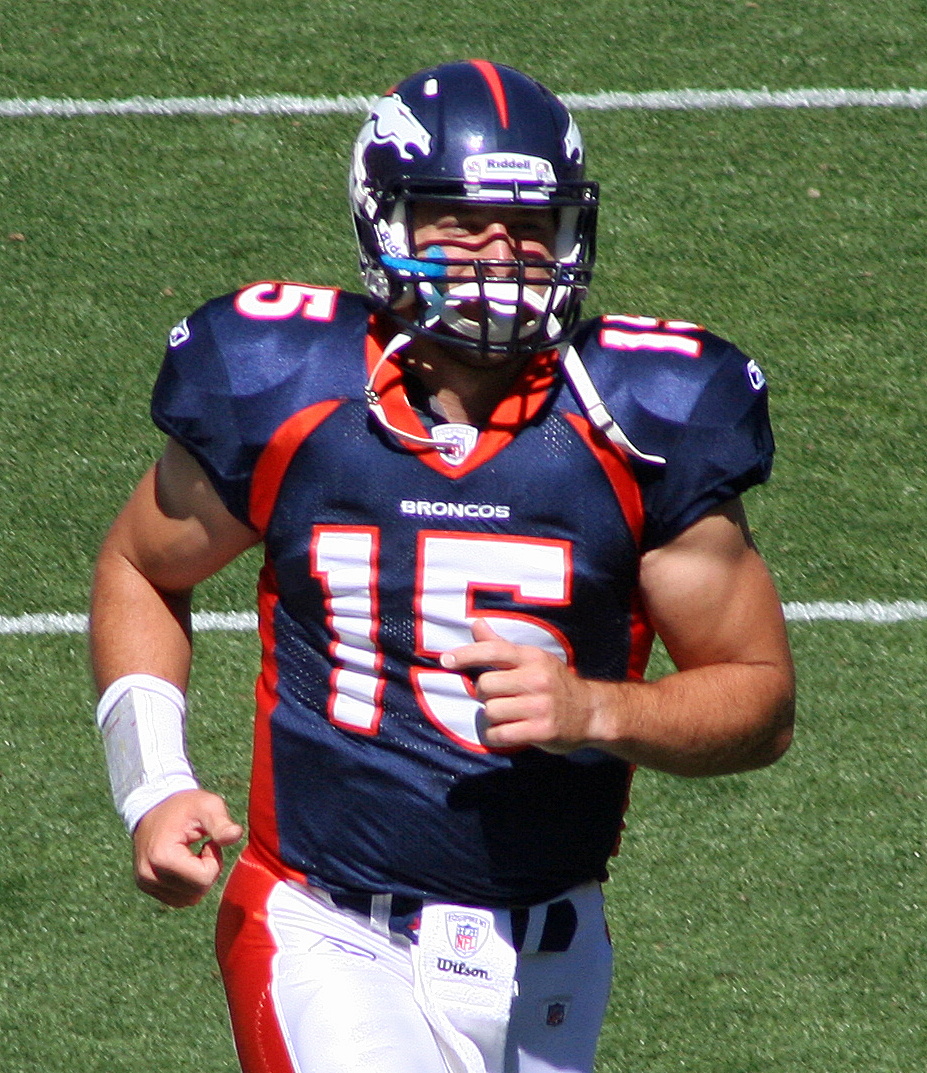
Tebow during warm-ups with the Denver Broncos at Sports Authority Field at Mile High in 2010

Tebow was selected by the Denver Broncos in the first round (25th overall) of the 2010 NFL draft. The Broncos had acquired the pick in a trade with the Baltimore Ravens on the first night of the draft for the Broncos' second, third and fourth round picks. Broncos head coach Josh McDaniels said about drafting Tebow, "He has all the traits you look for. It's a good pick." When asked how Tebow will be used, McDaniels commented that Tebow probably wouldn't start at quarterback as a rookie, and that he'll, "Play when he's ready." The Denver Post columnist Woody Paige praised the pick, saying "Tim Tremendous may be high risk, but he will be a Mile High Reward."

He set an NFL Draft record for jersey sales and continued to have the top selling jersey through the 2010 season.

On July 29, Tebow signed a five-year contract with the Broncos that had a base value of $11.25 million (he could make as much as $33 million through certain performance-based incentives). The contract included $8.7 million guaranteed.

On October 17, Tebow scored his first NFL touchdown, which was a five-yard running play against the New York Jets. On November 14, Tebow threw a three-yard touchdown pass to fullback Spencer Larsen on his first career NFL pass attempt, as part of a 49–29 home victory over the Kansas City Chiefs. He also added a one-yard rushing touchdown in the game.

Tebow started his first NFL game on December 19, which was a 39–23 road loss to the Oakland Raiders. He completed 8-of-16 passes for 138 yards, including a 33-yard touchdown pass. He also rushed for 78 yards, 40 of which came on a touchdown run in the first quarter of the game. It was the longest touchdown run for a quarterback in Broncos history and the longest touchdown run in NFL history for a quarterback in his first start.

Tebow's first career victory came in his second start on December 26. The Broncos defeated the Houston Texans, 24–23, in Denver. He helped rally the Broncos from a 17–0 deficit at halftime, as he finished the game with 308 passing yards and one touchdown pass. He also added a fourth-quarter rushing touchdown, which capped the comeback.

Tebow finished his rookie season playing sparingly in six games as a back-up (primarily on plays involving the wild horse formation, which is Denver's variation of the wildcat formation) before starting the last three games of the Broncos' season. He passed for a total of 654 yards, five touchdowns and three interceptions. He also rushed for 227 yards and six touchdowns. He became the first quarterback in NFL history to rush for a touchdown in each of his first three career starts.

==== 2011 season ====
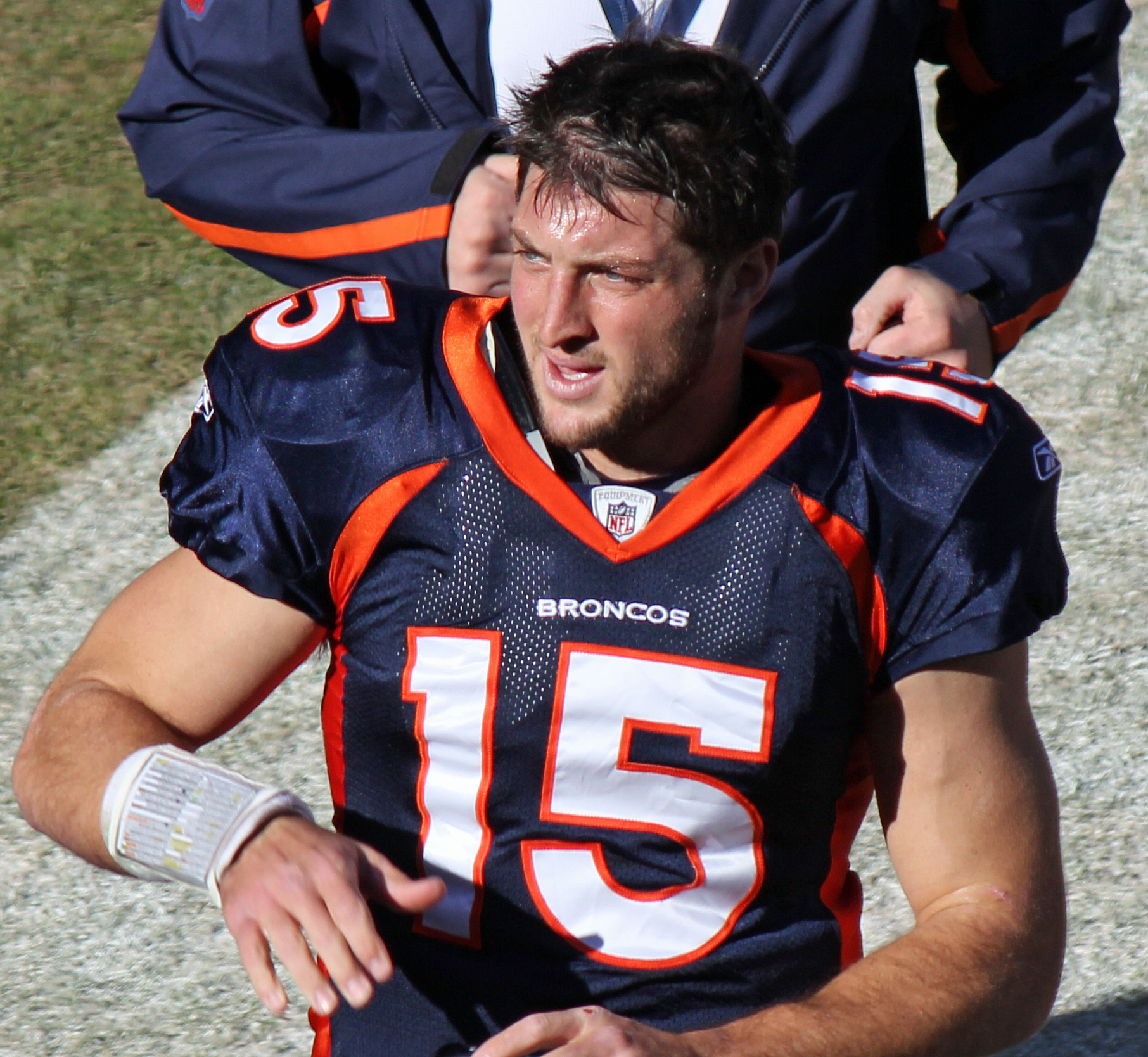
Tebow during the 2011 season

Tebow began the 2011 season as the Denver Broncos' backup quarterback, behind Kyle Orton. After the Broncos started 1–3, Tebow replaced Orton at halftime during a home game against the San Diego Chargers in week five. Tebow passed and ran for a touchdown in the fourth quarter, narrowing a 16-point difference to an ultimate 29–24 loss. Shortly afterward, Broncos' head coach John Fox announced Tebow would start in the following game on the road against the Miami Dolphins. Tebow struggled for three-and-a-half quarters against the Dolphins, taking six sacks, but rallied from a 15–0 deficit in the last three minutes to win the game 18–15 in overtime. The next week, Tebow took seven sacks in a 45–10 loss to the Detroit Lions.

On November 6, Tebow rushed for 118 yards, along with passing for 124 yards and two touchdowns, as part of a 38–24 road victory over the Oakland Raiders, second only to Norris Weese in Broncos history for rushing by a quarterback. The Broncos followed with another road win over the Kansas City Chiefs. Tebow completed two passes on eight attempts for 69 yards and a touchdown. His second completion, a 56-yard touchdown pass in the fourth quarter to wide receiver Eric Decker, sealed the game for Denver. Four days later, Tebow was 9-for-20 with 104 yards in a Thursday Night Football home game against the New York Jets. He led a 95-yard, game-winning touchdown drive with less than six minutes to play, capped by a 20-yard touchdown run on third-and-four with less than one minute remaining. Tebow guided the Broncos to another comeback victory the next week—a 16–13 overtime road win over the San Diego Chargers, where he ran the ball 22 times for 67 yards. In the tenth start of his NFL career, Tebow led the Broncos to their third consecutive come-from-behind win at the Minnesota Vikings, 35–32; followed by a fourth comeback win, this time 13–10 in overtime at home over the Chicago Bears after being shut out for almost 58 minutes.

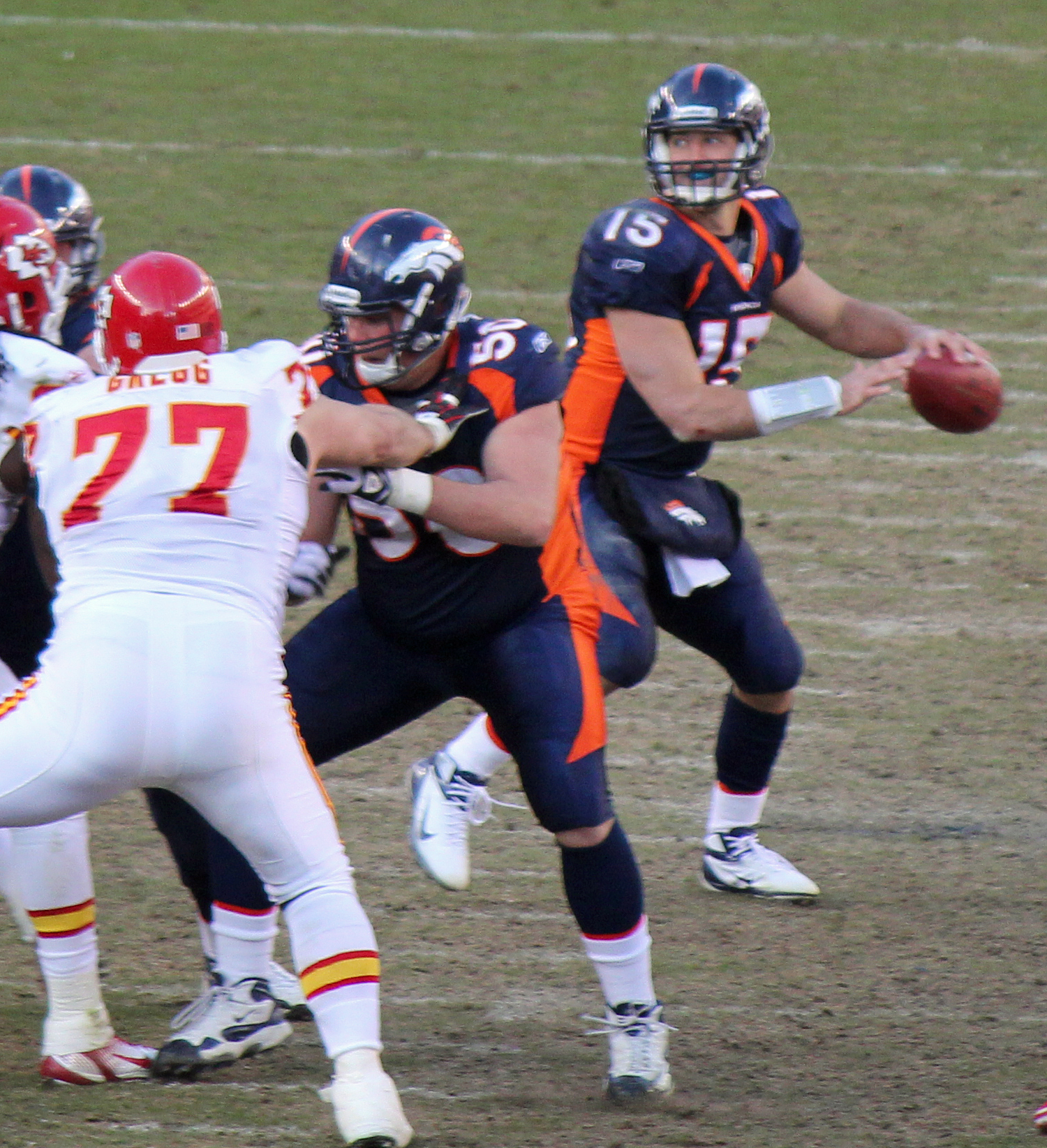
Tebow playing against the Kansas City Chiefs in January 2012

It was the last regular-season win of Tebow's career. In week 15, Tebow rushed for two touchdowns and completed 11-of-22 passes against the New England Patriots in a 41–23 loss. He was sacked four times in the game and had one fumble. In the Broncos' 40–14 loss to the Buffalo Bills the following week, he had one passing and one rushing touchdown but also threw three interceptions, two of which were returned for touchdowns, and two fumbles. He struggled for a third straight game the following week in a 7–3 loss to the Kansas City Chiefs, completing only 6-of-22 passes and finishing with a career-low quarterback rating of 20.6, but a loss by the Oakland Raiders clinched a playoff spot for the Broncos in the AFC West. After the three consecutive losses, Broncos vice president and former quarterback John Elway said Tebow was playing tentatively and needed to "pull the trigger".

On January 8, Denver hosted the Pittsburgh Steelers during the Wild Card Round of the NFL playoffs. Tebow completed 10-of-21 passes for a career-high 316 yards and two touchdowns, including an 80-yard touchdown to Demaryius Thomas on the first play of overtime, as the Broncos won 29–23. Media sources noted Tebow's passing yards (316) and yards per completion (31.6) evoked the Bible's John 3:16. The Nielsen ratings for the game also peaked at 31.6. John 3:16 was the top search item on Google the next morning, followed by Tebow and Tim Tebow. The next week, Tebow completed just nine of 26 passes and took five sacks in a 45–10 defeat at the hands of the New England Patriots in the Divisional Round.

After the season, Elway confirmed that Tebow would be the Broncos' starting quarterback going into training camp in 2012. Despite on-field successes by the Broncos under Tebow, he finished the season with the lowest passing completion rate in the NFL (reaching 50% in just four of his 14 games) which led many to question his potential as a quarterback at the professional level. Tebow's persistent fumbles also created uncertainty about his future as a quarterback.

=== New York Jets ===
After the Broncos signed free agent Peyton Manning, Tebow was traded to the New York Jets on March 21, 2012, along with the Broncos' 2012 seventh round draft pick, in exchange for the Jets' fourth and sixth round picks. Jets special teams coordinator Mike Westhoff stated that Tebow would be used on special teams, while head coach Rex Ryan and offensive coordinator Tony Sparano stated that he would also be used in the wildcat formation on offense. The presence of Tebow throughout the season, in which the Jets struggled, created a controversy as the fans and media called for Ryan to bench the inconsistent Mark Sanchez in favor of Tebow.

Tebow suffered two broken ribs during a road game against the Seattle Seahawks, but his injury was not confirmed until two days before the Jets' Thanksgiving game against the New England Patriots. He was active despite the injury, which was publicly revealed after the game. Tebow was inactive during the Jets' subsequent game against the Arizona Cardinals in which Sanchez was benched in favor of Greg McElroy. Tebow was credited with two starts in 2012, one while lined up at tight end to start the game and another while lined up at fullback.

On April 29, 2013, Tebow was released by the Jets. He had thrown only eight passes and rushed 32 times in his one season with the team.

=== New England Patriots ===
The New England Patriots signed Tebow on June 10, 2013, the day before the team's mandatory minicamp; Tebow signed a two-year contract with no guaranteed money, although it did have playing time-based incentives in 2014. The move reunited him with Josh McDaniels, who had resumed his positions as Patriots offensive coordinator and quarterbacks coach. Tebow played in the first two of New England's preseason games, against the Philadelphia Eagles and the Tampa Bay Buccaneers; he completed just five passes in both games, was sacked several times and intercepted once, intensifying criticism of his football acumen. He went 6-for-11 for 91 yards, throwing a pair of touchdown passes and one interception, and gained 30 yards on six carries against the New York Giants, but he also was sacked four times. He threw a total of two touchdown passes and two interceptions in the preseason and had a passer rating of 47.2 and completed 36.7% of his passes. He was released from the Patriots on August 31, 2013, the day NFL teams were required to cut their rosters to 53. After being cut, he publicly thanked the Patriots organization for the opportunity and stated: "I will remain in relentless pursuit of continuing my lifelong dream of being an NFL quarterback."

Though he began his broadcasting career in December 2013 on the SEC Network, Tebow continued to seek opportunities to resume his career as an NFL quarterback.

=== Philadelphia Eagles ===
Tebow signed a one-year contract with the Philadelphia Eagles on April 20, 2015, and was in competition with Matt Barkley for the Eagles third-string quarterback job. Tebow played all four games in the preseason with no starts, going 21-of-36 for 286 yards, two touchdowns, and one interception, while rushing for 82 yards and a touchdown. He was released by the team on September 5, following the fourth preseason game.

=== Jacksonville Jaguars ===
On May 20, 2021, after spending six years out of football, Tebow contacted his former college coach, Urban Meyer, then coach of the Jacksonville Jaguars, about returning to the sport. The Jaguars signed him as a tight end to a one-year contract for the veteran minimum of $920,000, none of which was guaranteed. The Jaguars released Tebow on August 17, 2021. He had not caught any passes or played on special teams during limited playing time in the preseason.

== Career statistics ==
Legend
**Bold**	Career high

=== NFL ===
==== Regular season ====
Year	Team	Games			Passing								Rushing				Sacks		Fumbles (Note: Fumbles lost data taken from Pro Football Reference career game log)	
Year	Team	GP	GS	Record	Cmp	Att	Pct	Yds	Y/A	TD	Int	Rtg	Att	Yds	Avg	TD	Sck	Yds	Fum	Lost
2010	DEN	9	3	1–2	41	82	50.0	654	**8.0**	5	3	82.1	43	227	5.3	**6**	6	26	1	0
2011	DEN	14	11	**7–4**	**126**	**271**	46.5	**1,729**	6.4	**12**	**6**	72.9	**122**	**660**	**5.4**	**6**	**33**	**225**	**13**	**6**
2012	NYJ	12	2	—	6	8	**75.0**	39	4.9	0	0	**84.9**	32	102	3.2	0	2	7	0	0
Career		35	16	8–6	173	361	47.9	2,422	6.7	17	9	75.3	197	989	5.0	12	41	258	14	6

==== Postseason ====
Year	Team	Games			Passing								Rushing				Sacks		Fumbles	
Year	Team	GP	GS	Record	Cmp	Att	Pct	Yds	Y/A	TD	Int	Rtg	Att	Yds	Avg	TD	Sck	Yds	Fum	Lost
2011	DEN	2	2	1–1	19	47	40.4	452	9.6	2	0	90.0	15	63	4.2	1	5	28	1	1
Career		2	2	1–1	19	47	40.4	452	9.6	2	0	90.0	15	63	4.2	1	5	28	1	1

Legend
Led the NCAA

=== College ===
Season	Team	Games			Passing								Rushing			
Season	Team	GP	GS	Record	Cmp	Att	Pct	Yds	Avg	TD	Int	Rate	Att	Yds	Avg	TD
2006	Florida	14	0	—	22	33	66.7	358	**10.8**	5	1	**201.7**	89	469	**5.3**	8
2007	Florida	13	13	9–4	**234**	**350**	66.9	**3,286**	9.4	**32**	**6**	172.5	210	895	4.3	**23**
2008	Florida	14	14	**13–1**	192	298	64.4	2,747	9.2	30	4	172.4	176	673	3.8	12
2009	Florida	14	14	**13–1**	213	304	**70.1**	2,895	9.2	21	5	164.2	**217**	**910**	4.2	14
Total		55	41	35–6	661	985	67.1	9,286	9.2	88	16	170.8	692	2,947	4.3	57

== Awards and honors ==
NFL

- PFWA Good Guy Award (2012)
- Ranked No. 95 in the Top 100 Players of 2012

2006 season

- SEC All-Freshman Team

2007 season

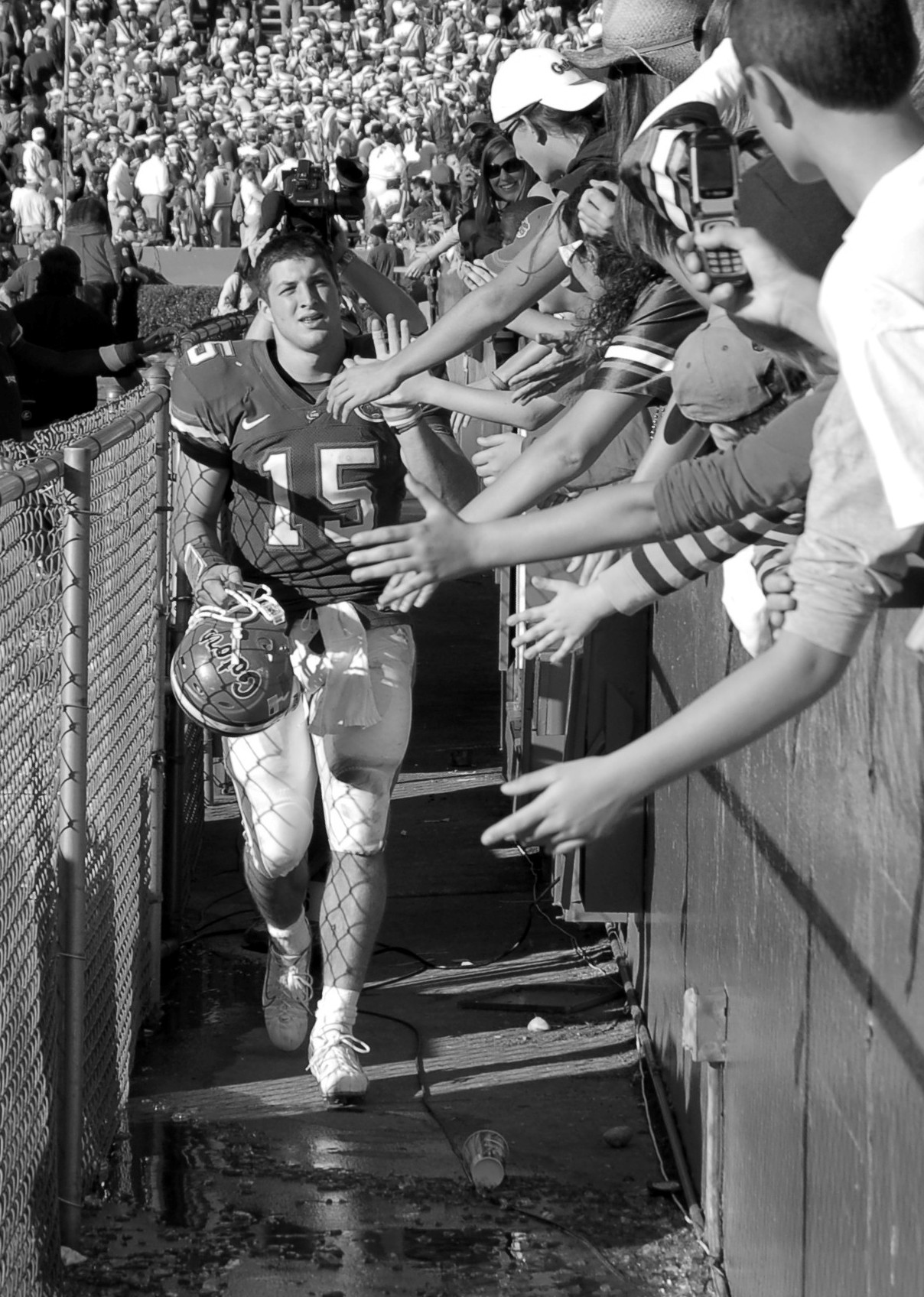
Tebow in 2007

- Walter Camp Award finalist
- Heisman Trophy Winner
- Sporting News Player of the Year
- First-team Academic All-American
- Manning Award finalist
- Rivals.com National Offensive Player of the Year
- Rivals.com SEC Offensive Player of the Year
- First-team All-SEC (Associated Press, Coaches, Rivals.com)
- Associated Press SEC Offensive Player of the Year
- First-team All-American by: Associated Press, Football Writers Association of America, Walter Camp Football Foundation, Sporting News, Sports Illustrated, ESPN, CBS Sports, College Football News, Rivals.com, and Scout.com
- Roy F. Kramer SEC Male Athlete of the Year.
- ESPY for Best Male College Athlete

2008 season

- First-team All-America by College Football News.
- ESPY for Best Male College Athlete
- Heisman Trophy finalist
- Roy F. Kramer SEC Male Athlete of the Year
- Southeastern Conference Offensive Player of the Week
- 2008 SEC Championship Game Most Valuable Player
- First-team All-SEC (AP, Coaches, Rivals.com)
- Southeastern Conference Scholar-Athlete of the Year
- First-team Academic All-American

2009 season

- First-team Academic All-American
- Senior CLASS Award
- Heisman Trophy finalist
- First-team All-SEC (AP, Coaches, Rivals.com)
- Second-team All-America (Walter Camp Foundation)
- Southeastern Conference Offensive Player of the Year
- Sports Illustrated College football Player of the Decade

== Media and culture ==
Tebow's football background combined with his outspoken views on Christianity led some media pundits to label him as a 'cultural phenomenon'.

A nationwide controversy surrounded Tebow's decision to appear in an ad funded by the socially conservative organization Focus on the Family that was broadcast on February 7, 2010, during Super Bowl XLIV on CBS. There were two 30-second commercials which included Tebow's personal story as part of a pro-life stance. The abortion issue was not specifically mentioned in the ad. Pro-choice groups criticized the ad, while pro-life groups supported Tebow.

In 2011, Tebow was the first quarterback to be featured in ESPN's "Year of the Quarterback" series. The documentary, titled Tim Tebow: Everything in Between, followed him from the 2010 Sugar Bowl to the 2010 NFL draft. It premiered on January 6, 2011. On November 8, 2011, the documentary was released on DVD.

On May 31, 2011, HarperCollins released Through My Eyes, an autobiography that Tebow co-wrote with author Nathan Whitaker. Tebow details his early life growing up in Jacksonville and the Philippines, as well as his experiences as a college football quarterback. By March 4, 2012, it had spent 24 weeks on the New York Times best seller list. It was named the #1 sports book of 2011. Tebow followed his memoir with a young readers' edition titled Through My Eyes: A Quarterback's Journey, also co-written with Whitaker.

Tebow was the subject of a 2012 documentary on NFL Network's A Football Life entitled The Faces of Tebow. He is a spokesperson for Nike, Jockey International, FRS Health Energy, and TiVo.

In 2013, Tebow collaborated with headphone maker Soul Electronics to create his own signature line of headphones. He launched a line which he called the 'Jet'.

In an episode that aired on February 4, 2016, Tebow competed against The Vampire Diaries actress Nina Dobrev on Spike's Lip Sync Battle. Tebow won the lip-sync contest with performances of "Take Your Time" by Sam Hunt and "Eye of the Tiger" by Survivor.

== Broadcasting career ==
On December 30, 2013, Tebow was hired by ESPN as a college football analyst. He appears mainly on the SEC Network as co-host of SEC Nation, a travelling pre-game show, and contributed to ESPN's other platforms as well; Tebow made his debut on ESPN during the 2014 BCS National Championship Game. He did not give up on playing in the NFL, however, as his contract allowed him to continue to pursue opportunities as a player.

Tebow signed a multi-year extension of his contract with ESPN in 2017. His new contract allowed him to continue to pursue his pro baseball career.

Tebow was asked to co-host ABC News' Good Morning America on January 31, 2014, two days before Super Bowl XLVIII, and was joined on the morning show by Eli Manning.

Tebow also hosted two television shows, the second season of Home Free, a reality show about home renovation on Fox in 2016, and Million Dollar Mile, an obstacle course competition show in 2019 on CBS.

On September 2, 2021, shortly after his release from the Jaguars, Tebow joined First Take, a talk show run by Stephen A. Smith.

== Filmmaking career ==
Tim Tebow was executive producer along with his older brother Robby Tebow, and actor in his first movie Run the Race which was released on February 22, 2019, in the U.S. This film is an inspirational sports drama with a football theme.

== Professional baseball career ==
Tim Tebow
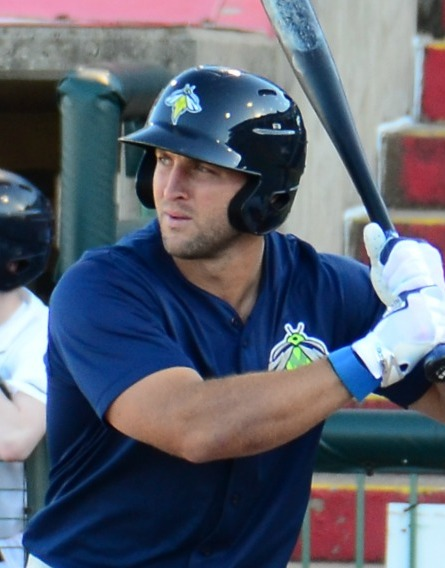
- Tebow batting in 2017
- Left fielder
- Batted: Left Threw: Left

MILB debut
- April 6, 2017, for the Columbia Fireflies

Last MILB appearance
- July 21, 2019, for the Syracuse Mets

MILB statistics
- Batting average: .223
- Hits: 210
- Home runs: 18
- Runs batted in: 107
- Stats at Baseball Reference

Teams
- Columbia Fireflies (2017); St. Lucie Mets (2017); Binghamton Rumble Ponies (2018); Syracuse Mets (2019)

=== Early interest ===
In early August 2016, Tebow made announcements that he was interested in pursuing a career in professional baseball and invited all 30 Major League Baseball teams to his open tryout at the end of August. Tebow had not played baseball full-time since 2005, his junior year in high school, when he was an all-state player and the Los Angeles Angels of Anaheim expressed interest in drafting him had he played his senior year. Additionally, he had a tryout with and received interest from the Los Angeles Dodgers prior to the 2016 Major League Baseball season. On August 9, Tebow received contract offers (without tryouts) from two minor independent professional teams: the Schaumburg Boomers of the Frontier League and the Southern Maryland Blue Crabs of the Atlantic League of Professional Baseball. On the day before his tryout, Tebow was also offered a contract by Águilas del Zulia, a team in the Venezuelan Professional Baseball League that plays winter baseball. Tebow held his tryout on August 30 at Dedeaux Field in front of 40 MLB scouts (from 28 of the 30 MLB teams), Dodgers scouting director Billy Gasparino, and 50 members of the media.

=== New York Mets ===
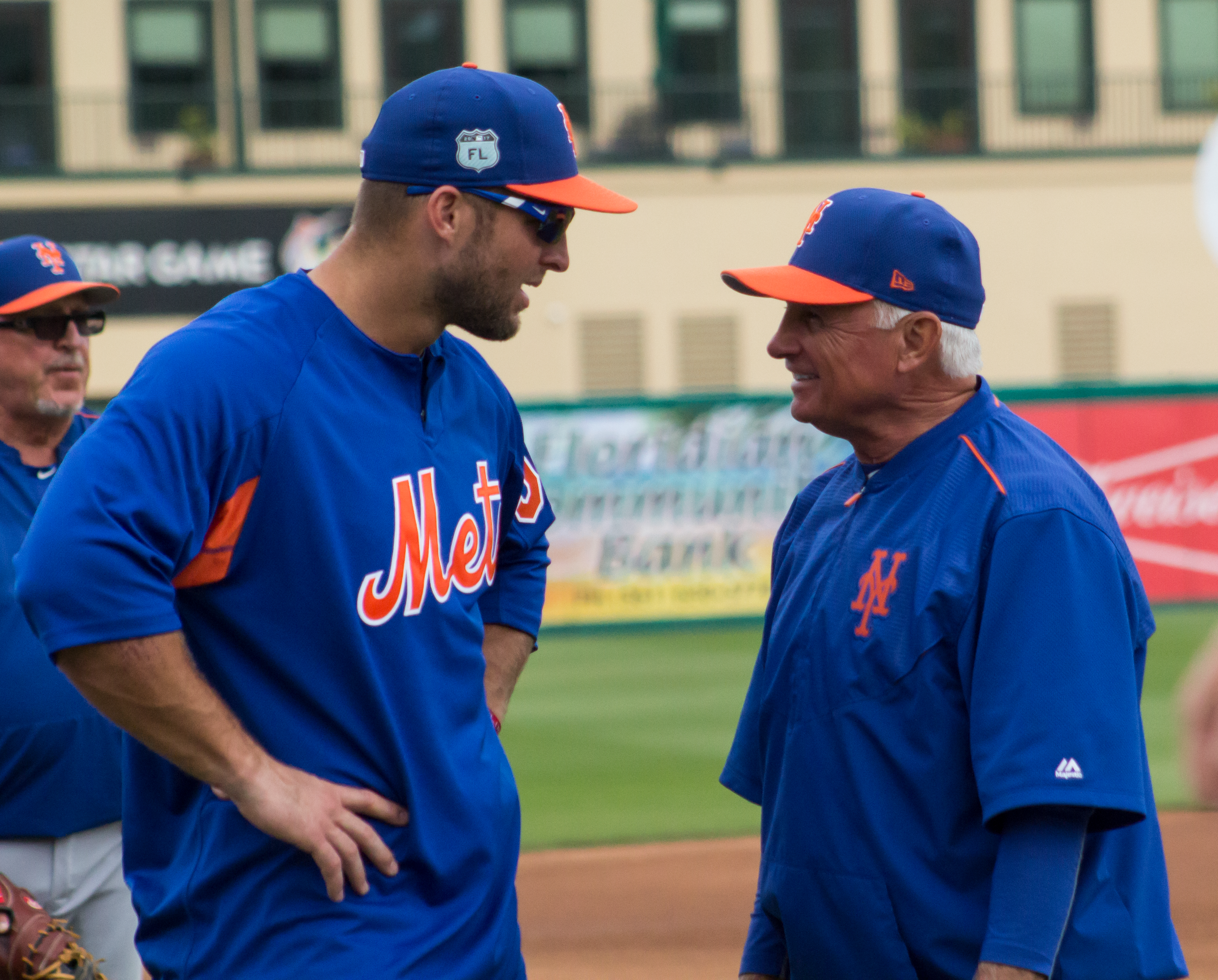
Tebow speaking with Mets manager Terry Collins, March 2017

==== 2016 ====
On September 8, 2016, Tebow signed a minor league contract with the New York Mets and participated in the Mets' instructional league. In his first at bat with the organization, on September 28, 2016, Tebow hit a home run on the first pitch. The Mets assigned him to the Scottsdale Scorpions of the Arizona Fall League, where he batted .194 in 70 plate appearances, with 20 strikeouts in 62 at bats.

==== 2017 ====
Tebow spent most of 2017 spring training in the Mets' minor league camp, with a few appearances in major league camp. He began the 2017 regular season with the Columbia Fireflies of the Class A South Atlantic League. On April 6, 2017, Tebow hit a home run in his first at bat for the Fireflies, playing against the Augusta GreenJackets. He batted .222 with three home runs and 23 runs batted in for Columbia. On June 25, the Mets promoted Tebow to the St. Lucie Mets of the Class A-Advanced Florida State League. Once again he homered in his first day with his new club, St. Lucie, on June 28. Tebow had a 12-game hitting streak between July 3 and 14. Tebow finished the year at St. Lucie hitting .231, with 5 home runs and 57 strikeouts, in 216 at bats. Tebow expressed interest in returning for another season in 2018.

==== 2018 ====
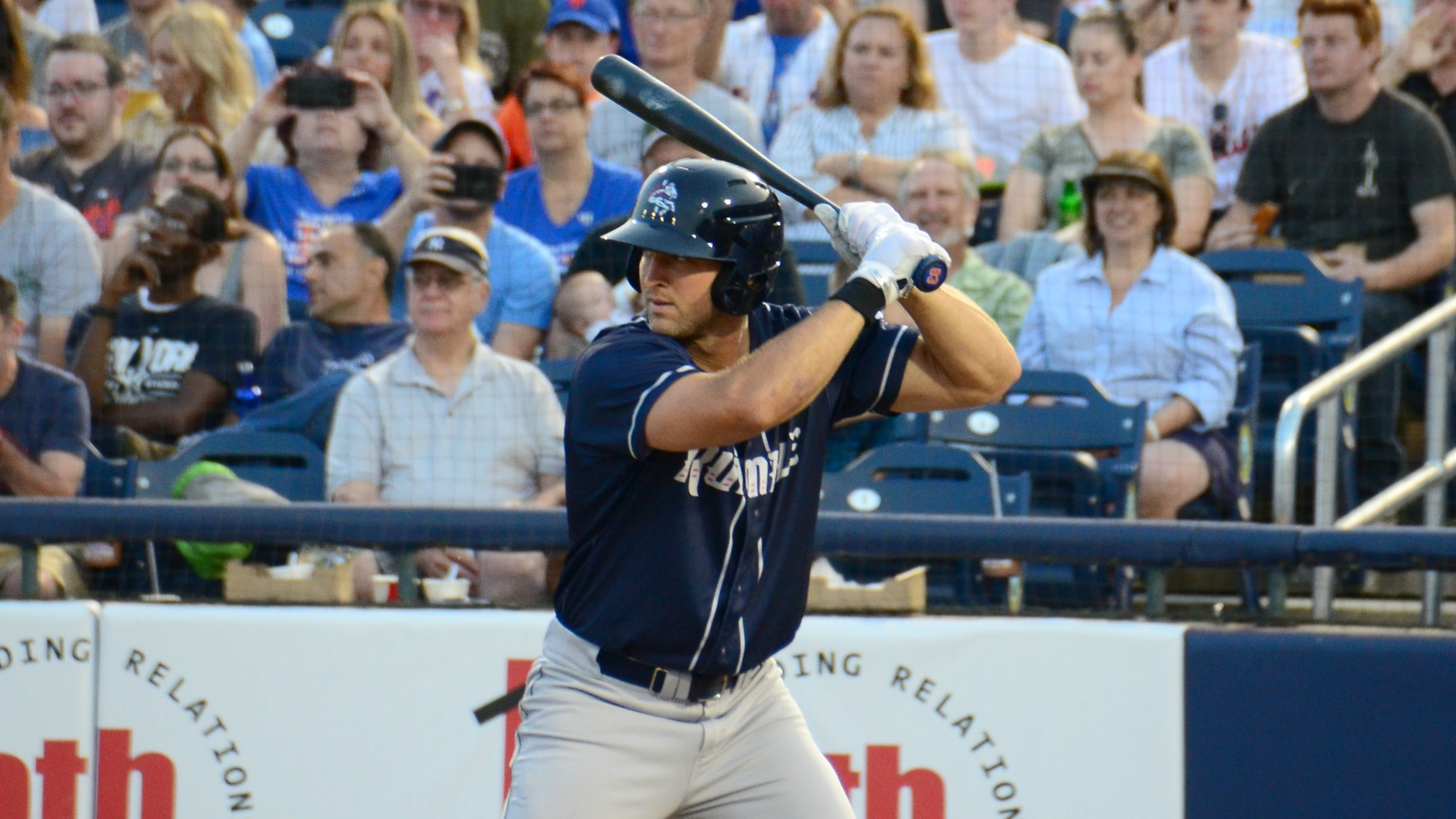
Tebow with Binghamton, June 2018

On January 19, 2018, the Mets announced that they would invite Tebow to major league camp. Despite a poor showing in spring training (1-for-18 with 11 strikeouts), the Mets organization promoted Tebow to their Double-A team, the Binghamton Rumble Ponies of the Eastern League. On April 5, Tebow again hit a home run in his first at bat for a new team; with two men on base, he hit the first pitch over the right-field wall. On June 29, Tebow was named to the Eastern League All-Star Game; at the time, he was batting .261 for the season and .323 in his last 21 games. In the All-Star Game, held on July 11, Tebow went 1-for-4 as the East team's designated hitter.

On July 23, the Mets organization announced that Tebow had broken the hamate bone in his right hand, which required surgery and led him to miss the remainder of the season.

==== 2019 ====
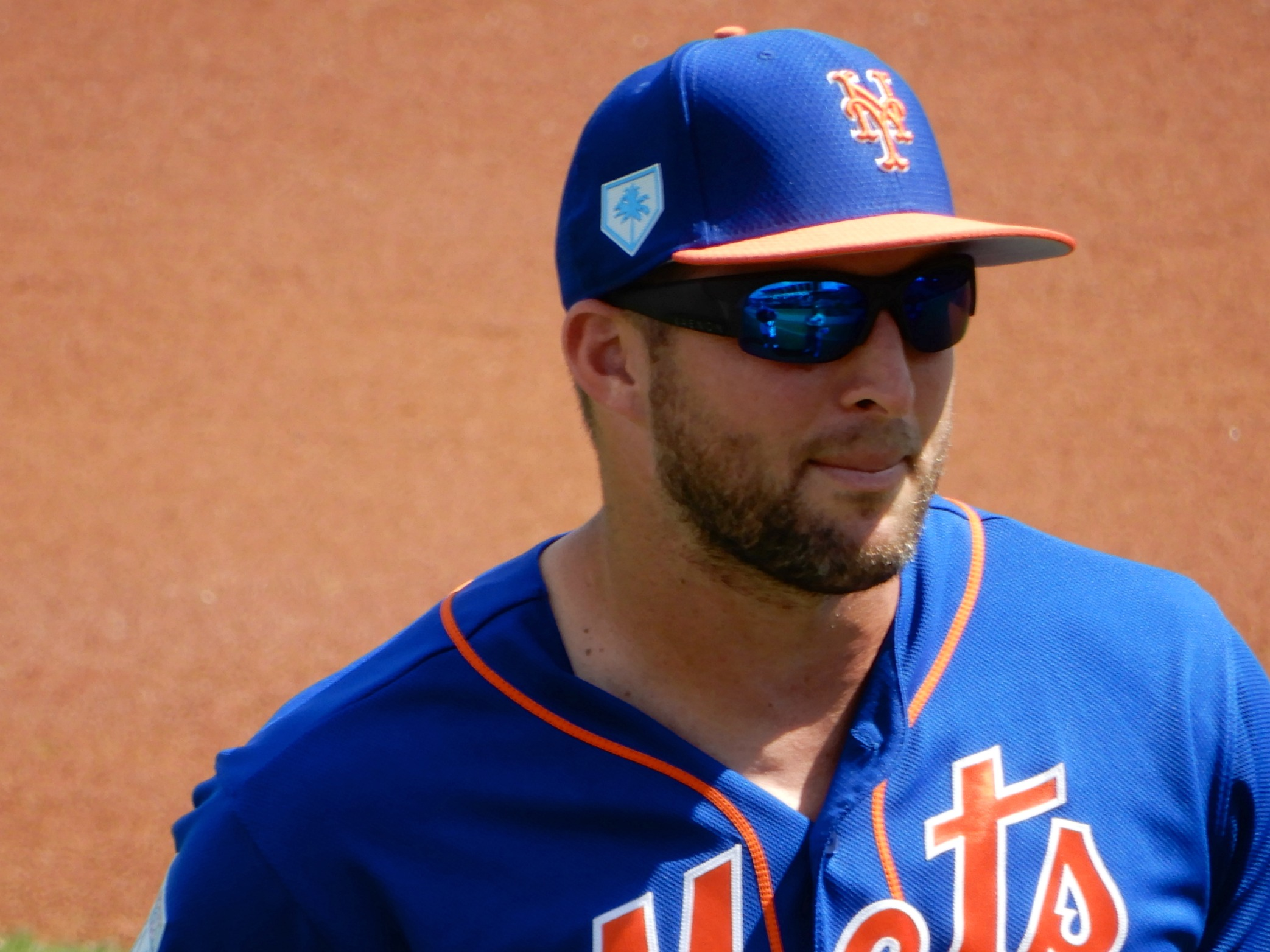
Tebow during spring training with the Mets, February 2019

In November 2018, the Mets assigned Tebow to the Syracuse Mets of the Class AAA International League. He spent spring training in 2019 with the New York Mets, and returned to Syracuse to start the 2019 season. On May 18, 2019, the Syracuse Mets held a Tebow bobblehead giveaway for the first 1,000 fans in attendance.

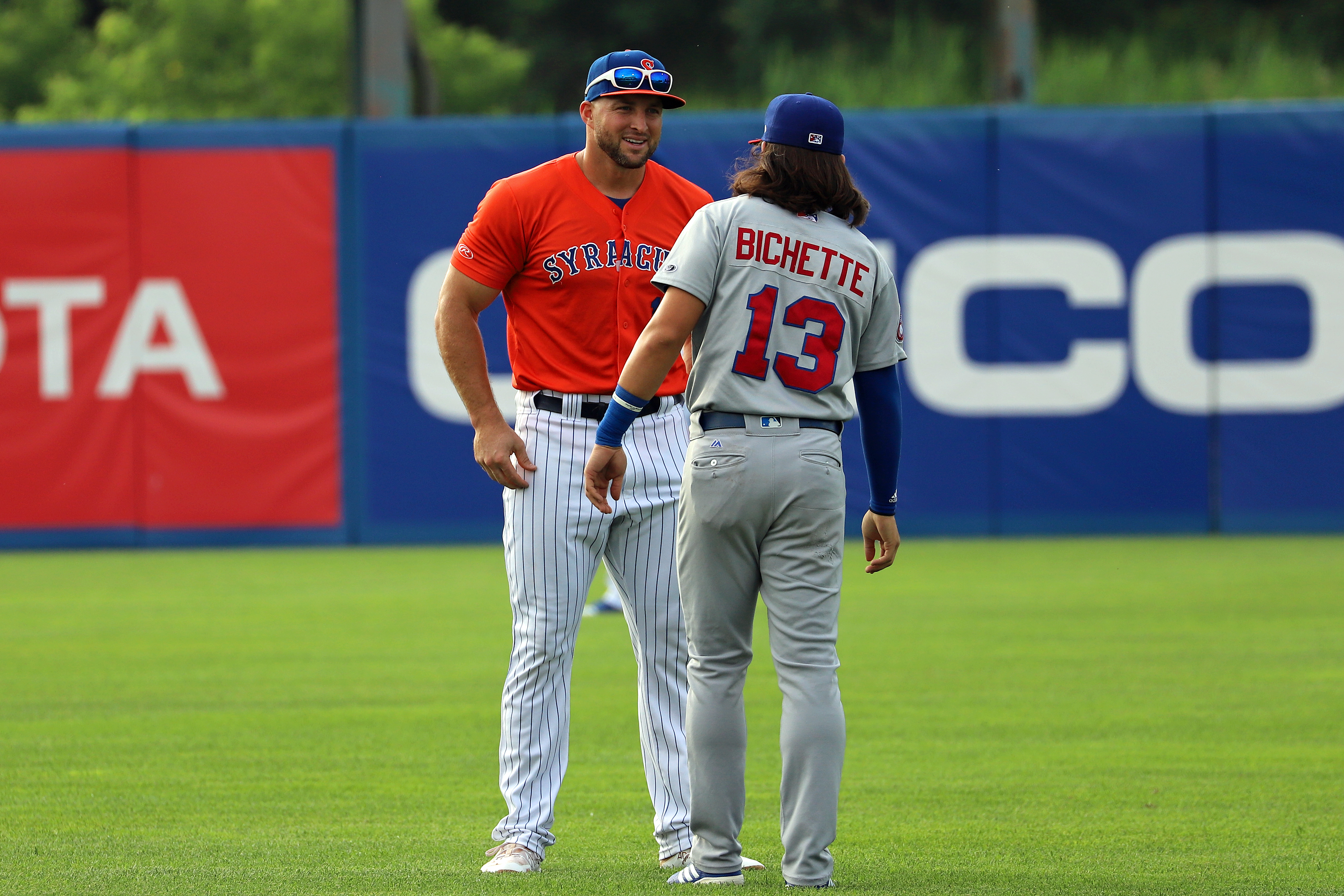
Tebow with future Blue Jays shortstop Bo Bichette, July 2019

Between June 28 and July 5, 2019, Tebow hit three home runs over an AAA six game stretch for the Syracuse Mets, his best performance as a professional baseball player.

On July 21, 2019, Tebow injured his left pinky fielding a ball in the outfield, requiring eight stitches. As a result, he missed the remainder of the 2019 season.

==== 2020 ====
On February 25, Tebow hit his first major league spring training home run, a two-run home run against Detroit Tigers' reliever Alex Wilson.

==== 2021 ====
On February 17, Tebow and the Mets formally announced his retirement from professional baseball.

=== Career statistics ===
					Regular season
Season	Team	League	Level	Affiliate	GP	PA	AB	R	H	2B	3B	HR	RBI	SB	BB	SO	BA
2016	Scottsdale Scorpions	AzFL	Fall	NYM	19	71	62	6	12	3	0	0	2	1	8	20	.194
2017	Columbia Fireflies	SAL	A	NYM	64	244	214	29	47	14	1	3	23	0	24	69	.220
2017	St. Lucie Mets	FLOR	A-Adv.	NYM	62	242	216	21	50	10	1	5	21	2	19	57	.231
2018	Binghamton Rumble Ponies	EL	AA	NYM	84	298	271	32	74	14	1	6	36	1	22	103	.273
2019	Syracuse Mets	IL	AAA	NYM	77	264	239	25	39	10	0	4	19	2	20	98	.163

=== World Baseball Classic ===
Tebow accepted an invitation by the Philippines national team to play on their 2021 World Baseball Classic team. He was eligible to play for the Philippines as he was born there. He was scheduled to play in the qualifying round in March 2020 in Arizona, but the tournament was cancelled due to the COVID-19 pandemic.

== Sports team ownership ==
In July 2023, Tebow was announced as a co-owner of an ECHL expansion team to be based in the Lake Tahoe area, later named the Tahoe Knight Monsters. Tebow was also previously a minor partner in the ECHL's Jacksonville Icemen and Savannah Ghost Pirates. In August 2025, Tebow was also named as a co-owner of a second ECHL expansion team, the Augusta Lynx.

Tebow is also an investor in USL Championship and USL Super League soccer club Sporting Club Jacksonville.

== "Tebowing" ==
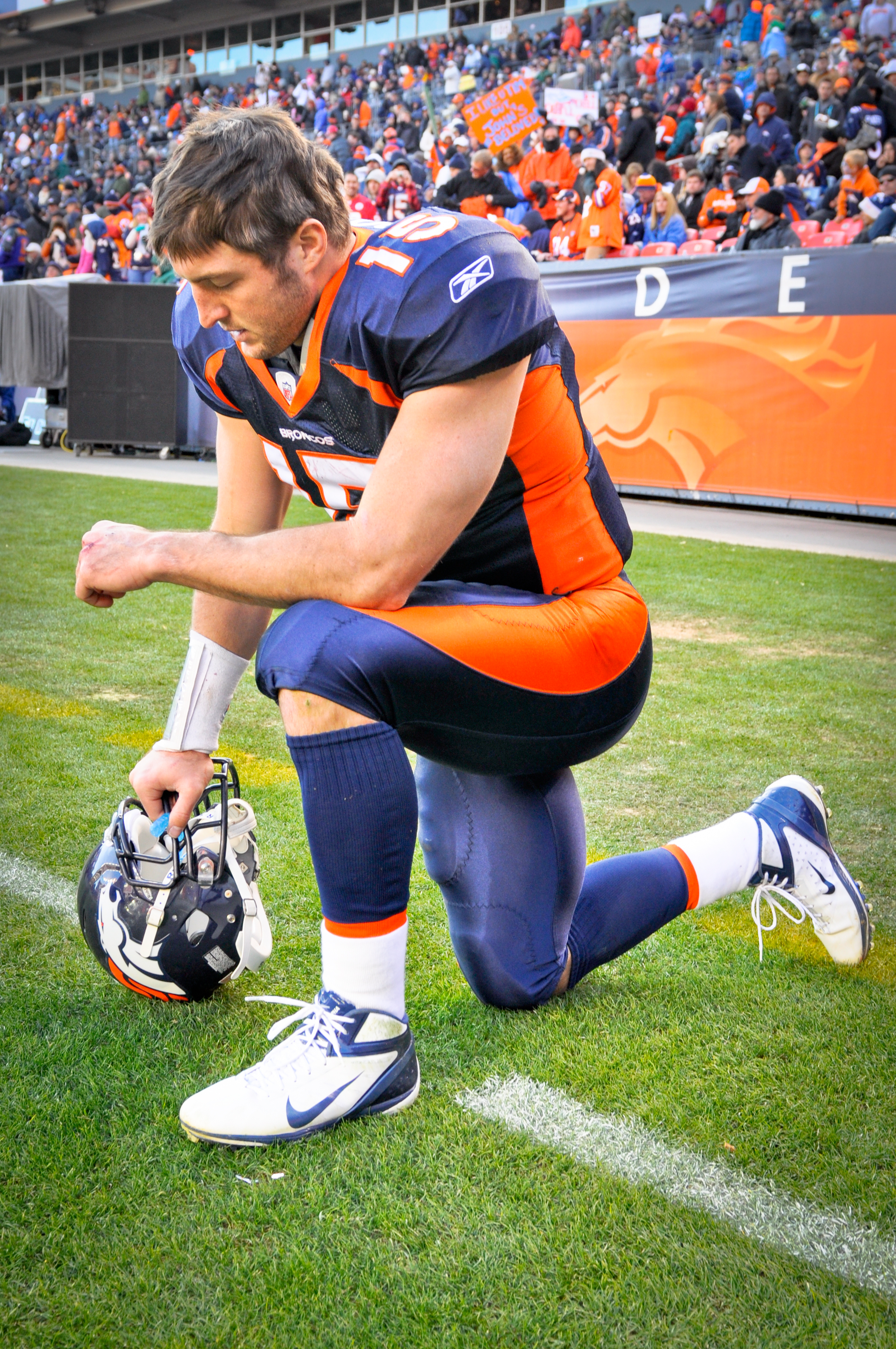
Tebow kneeling in prayer, which has since been referred to as "Tebowing"

"Tebowing" is a neologism for the act of kneeling on one knee in prayer specifically with one's head bowed and an arm resting on the one bent knee, a form of genuflecting. It is derived from Tebow's propensity for kneeling and praying. The origin of the phrase is credited to fan Jared Kleinstein, who posted a picture with friends on Facebook, in which they mimicked a pose of Tebow following the Broncos' comeback overtime victory over the Dolphins on October 23, 2011. The popularity of the picture led Kleinstein to set up a website showing pictures submitted by people depicting various interpretations of "Tebowing" all over the world. After two-and-a-half months, the site received 20,000 photograph submissions and 20 million page views from 2 million unique visitors. The New York Times wrote "it can be hard to tell whether [people Tebowing] are celebrating or mocking [Tebow] for his virtuous ways."

Pittsburgh mayor Luke Ravenstahl Tebowed as part of a bet with the mayor of Denver following the Broncos playoff victory over the Steelers in 2012. On October 9, 2012, Tebow was awarded the trademark to "Tebowing" after winning a legal battle with two fans who had expressed interest in trademarking the name.

"Tebowing" was included as a feature in the Madden NFL 13 video game.

== Personal life ==
On January 10, 2019, Tebow announced his engagement to Miss Universe 2017 and South African model Demi-Leigh Nel-Peters. The couple were married during a 30-minute ceremony in South Africa on January 20, 2020. Their daughter was born in July 2025.

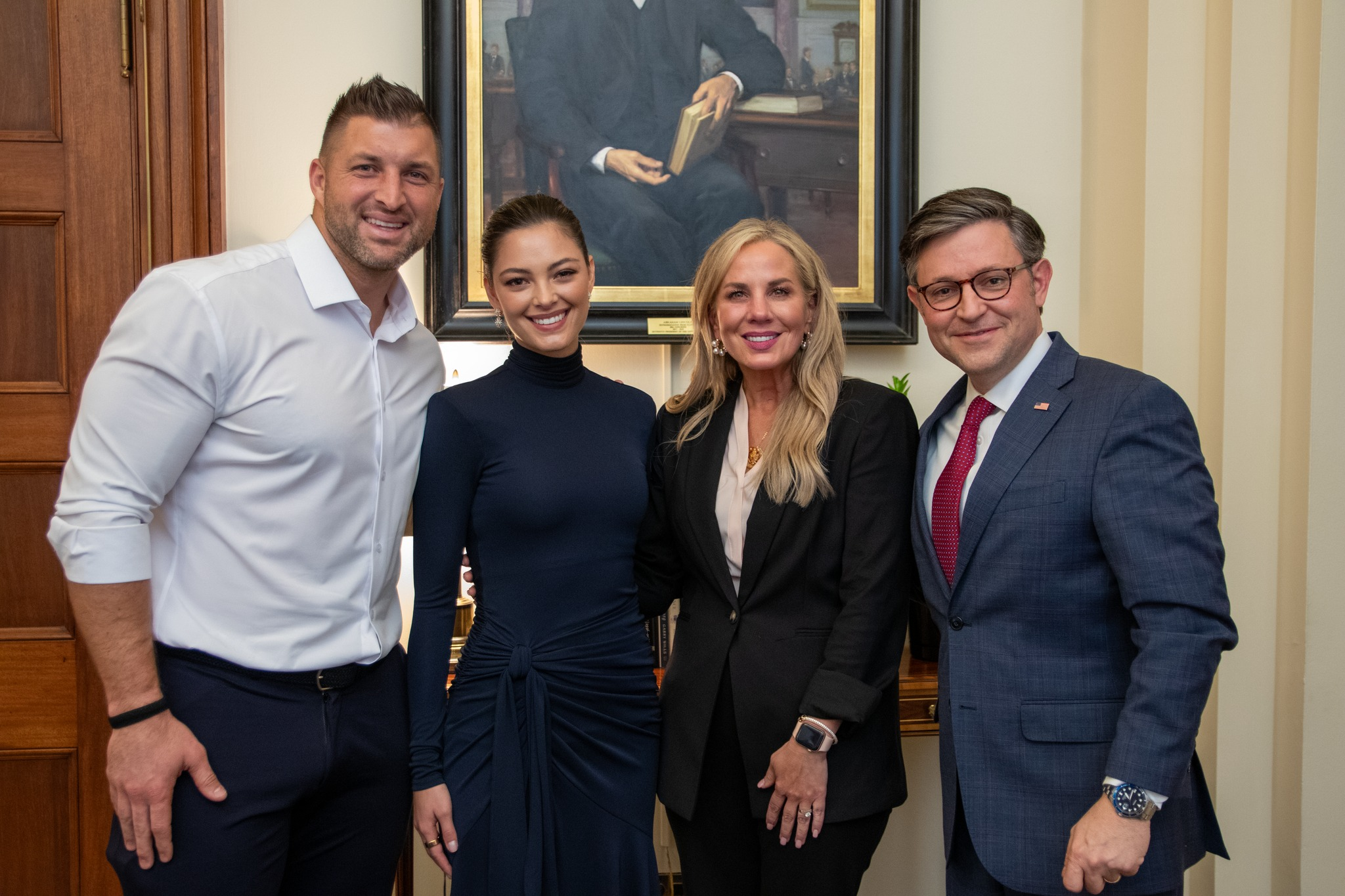
Tebow and his wife with Speaker Mike Johnson and his wife in 2024

Tebow has appeared repeatedly at events in opposition to abortion, including the 2021 March for Life, where he was a featured speaker. He has been described as "staunch pro-life activist", which he in part attributes to his mother's decision to carry him.

Tebow was elected to the College Football Hall of Fame on January 9, 2023, and was inducted on December 5, 2023.

=== Christianity ===
Tebow is known for his outspoken Christian faith. In the Philippines, he preached at schools and villages, and assisted with medical care. Tebow supports more than 40 national evangelists working in that nation. In the United States, Tebow has shared his Christian faith in prisons and schools, to church and youth groups, and at meetings and conferences.

Tebow is a strong advocate for faith-based abstinence, and has publicly stated that he maintained his virginity until marriage. Tebow has spoken multiple times at events presented by the Fellowship of Christian Athletes.

An Easter Sunday crowd of roughly 20,000 in Florida listened to Tebow on April 8, 2012. He only briefly mentioned his move from Denver to New York, saying, "Kind of got traded. I'm on another team—excited to be a Jet. Regardless of what happens, I still honor my Lord and Savior Jesus Christ, because at the end of the day, that's what's important, win or lose. ... We need to get back to one nation under God, and be role models for kids."

=== Philanthropy ===
Tebow envisioned a foundation to give back to others during his college career, and he, along with other University of Florida students, created "First and 15", raising funds for Uncle Dick's Orphanage in the Philippines, founded by his father's nonprofit association, the Bob Tebow Evangelistic Association. He also raised money for Shands Hospital pediatric cancer center in Gainesville and a Disney trip for disadvantaged children. Upon graduation from University of Florida, Tebow launched the Tim Tebow Foundation in January 2010. In 2013, Tebow was designated a Great Floridian by Florida Governor Rick Scott in recognition of his "major contributions to the progress and welfare" of Florida.

CURE and the Tebow Foundation announced plans to build a children's hospital in the fall of 2011 in the Philippines, the country where Tebow was born. The Tebow CURE Hospital in Davao City, on the island of Mindanao, holds 30 beds and specializes in orthopedics. CURE's 12th hospital worldwide, they hoped to heal deformities such as clubfoot, untreated burns, hydrocephalus and other conditions correctable with surgery. The cost of the project, $3 million, came from donations from CURE and the Tebow Foundation. The hospital includes a "Timmy's Playroom".

The Tim Tebow Foundation includes Night to Shine, an event geared towards providing people with developmental and intellectual disabilities a safe space to have a prom.

== See also ==
- 2007 All-America college football team
- 2008 All-America college football team
- List of Florida Gators football All-Americans
- List of Florida Gators in the NFL draft
- List of Heisman Trophy winners
- List of NCAA Division I FBS rushing touchdown leaders
- List of NCAA major college football yearly passing leaders
- List of SEC Most Valuable Players
- List of University of Florida alumni
- List of left-handed quarterbacks

== Bibliography ==
- Carlson, Norm, University of Florida Football Vault: The History of the Florida Gators, Whitman Publishing, LLC, Atlanta, Georgia (2007). ISBN 0-7948-2298-3.
- Lake, Thomas (2013). "The Book of Tebow". Sports Illustrated. New York: Time Inc. Archived from the original on November 26, 2013.
