= In Fast Company =

In Fast Company may refer to:

- In Fast Company (1946 film), a film starring The Bowery Boys
- In Fast Company (1924 film), an American silent action film

== See also ==
- Fast Company (disambiguation)
