= Protestant youth ministry =

A Protestant or Evangelical youth ministry is a Christian ministry aimed towards young people through the lens of Protestant or Evangelical traditions. Focuses may include the instruction of youths in what it means to be a Christian, how to mature as a Christian, and how to evangelize others through apologetics. Youth ministries may vary widely depending on their denomination, size, liberal or conservative outlook and geographic location.

The doctrine of Sunday Sabbatarianism held by many Christian denominations encourages practices such as Sunday School attendance as it teaches that the entirety of the Lord's Day should be devoted to God; as such many children and teenagers often return to church in the late afternoon for youth group before attending an evening service of worship.

== History ==
=== United States ===
==== 19th century ====
Youth ministry in the United States began in the mid-19th century, in the wake of the Industrial Revolution. These changes resulted in young men moving into central urban areas to work in factories. Laypersons who noticed these young adults working six days a week and gallivanting about town on Sundays aspired to educate them. Early youth ministry focused on teaching older children and teenagers to read the Bible. Early ministry was designed for unchurched children with no formal education. A desirable secondary effect was that students would be inspired to become more devoted to their faith through the reading of Biblical passages.

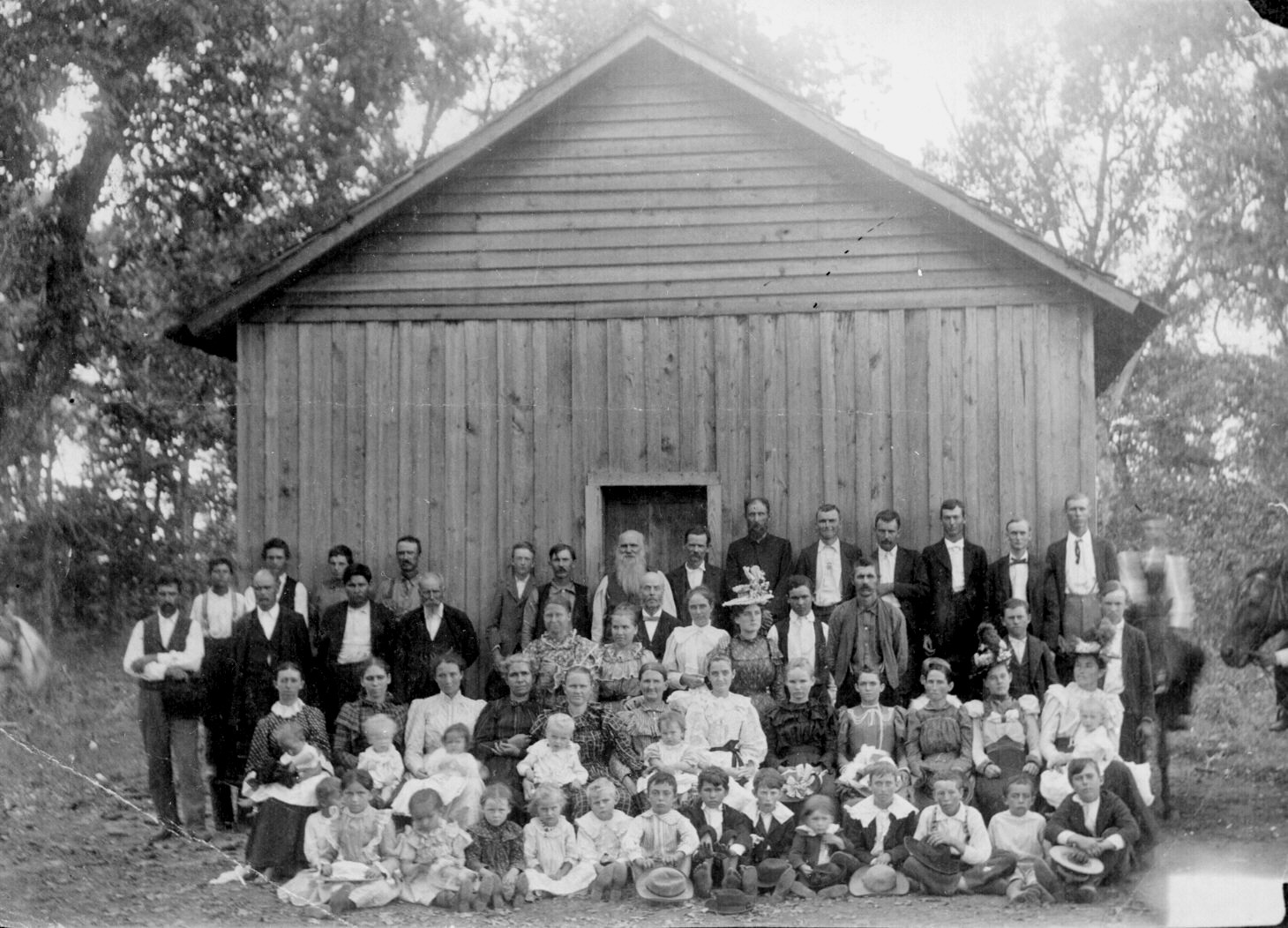
Sunday school class in Oklahoma, 1900

Eventually, churches opened up Sunday school to church members and unchurched children and teens alike. Teachers encouraged students to bring their friends, and the movement gained momentum. Laypersons would often work independently, neither subjecting themselves to congregational scrutiny nor receiving church funding. This fostered the development of interdenominational teaching programs and, eventually, faith-based organizations devoted to youth such as the YMCA and YWCA, whose American branches were founded in the 1850s.

American clergyman Francis Edward Clark founded the Christian Endeavor Society in 1881, which further popularized youth ministry. Clark set the limit for each society at 80 members. By 1887, there were 700 societies with over 50,000 members spread out across 33 states.

In response to the rapid expansion of the Christian Endeavor Society, mainstream denominations began their own youth organizations modeled after it. Some examples are the Methodist church’s Epworth League, and the Lutheran church's Luther League. These new church-based organizations, as well as interdenominational ones already in existence, flourished, increasing in attendance and international outreach involvement as a part of faith-based foreign aid.

==== 20th century ====
After World War I, the focus of many youth ministries began to shift from outreach and conversion to education and understanding of faith. From the 1930s to the 1960s, many churches emphasized fellowship and theological understanding.

Before 1940, youth fellowships were primarily headed by the congregation's pastor. Beginning in the late 1940s, some churches introduced church youth committees, composed of youth who had recently returned from war.

The 1940s also saw the founding of parachurch ministries. Young Life was founded by Jim Rayburn in 1941. The Young Life Parachurch Model proved to be effective at reaching young people, and by the early 1950', Parachurch Youth Ministries with full-time staff flourished. Billy Graham was the first full-time parachurch worker for Youth for Christ (YfC) in the USA. This movement spread quickly around the world. During the 1950s, parachurch ministries grew rapidly in most Christianized countries, and the focus of activity was on large events, known as rallies, and stadium events, known as Crusades. The emphasis was on promoting inter-church activities (between local denominational churches) – mainly in the format of youth rallies – the type of stadium events made popular by Youth for Christ.

The 1960s were characterized by campus ministries. Many college-aged students did not have their theological needs met by these fellowship groups; soon thereafter, even younger adolescents began to see their organizations as institutionalized and irrelevant. Denominations stopped publishing youth group (Sunday School) resources and large group gatherings dwindled down into small meetings and then into nothing. Then specific church-based activities for youth emerged, as Friday night youth groups began.

During the 1970s, many denominations implemented strategies for modernizing existing youth ministry in the hopes of reviving it. Differences in youth ministry started to emerge on a denominational basis instead of organization to organization.

During the early 1980s, counselling became more widespread in church environments, and churches began to hire professional counsellors. This influenced youth groups and the Bible study meetings became "fellowship groups" or "home groups" with an emphasis on caring and meeting people.

More recently, despite Francis Edward Clark's original intent for youth ministry to raise young adults “responsible for larger service in the Church of Christ,” studies indicate significant numbers of young people are not transitioning into the Adult Church from Youth Ministry after graduation from high school. As a result, more churches are scrutinizing their traditional Youth Ministry programming and working to engage parents and the Adult Church more fully with the young people and involve young people more deeply in the work of the church.

== Organization in the United States ==
Youth ministry today is a large part of American Christian culture. In New York City alone there are over 3,500 youth organizations operating today. Despite denominational difference, there are basic practices and goals that most youth groups have in common.

=== Organization ===
Most youth groups tend to follow a similar organizational model. The church that supports them will allocate funds to use for the activities of the group. It also will employ a paid staff member or volunteer to lead the group, known as a youth pastor, youth minister, Pastor of Student Ministries, Youth Leader, or other similar terms. This person may be a layperson, hold a religious degree, or be a member of the ordained clergy, depending on the needs and resources of the church. Their duties may include orchestrating the activities of the group (in particular, the content of the regular meetings below), providing pastoral care for the members of the youth group, managing a budget for the youth group, and serving as a liaison between the youth and adult bodies of the congregation.

Today's youth ministries hold regular meetings, often at the same time as adult functions at the church. Youth group meetings generally feature the same types of activities as a Sunday morning church service; modified to reflect the culture of the age groups involved. Services may include a time for worship, drama, games or other activities as well as fellowship through conversation and/or food, and prayer. Many youth ministers also present a sermon or devotional. It's common for youth groups to attend Christian summer camps each year.

Most denominations arrange their Youth Ministry programs according to related educational levels. American churches tend to separate youth by grade level, creating smaller sub-groups within a youth ministry program. These distinctions usually fall between middle school and high school. Traditionally, elementary age children and below have separate programs altogether, though this, too, may be managed by the same youth pastor. Some youth groups even extend up through college students, creating an additional sub-group often referred to as "college and career".

=== Goals ===
The primary goal of most modern-day Youth Ministries is to teach youth biblical doctrines and to encourage them to regularly pray. This is different from the original education/literacy-centered programs of Sunday schools during the 19th century.

Prior to the 21st century, many denominations placed less emphasis on the role of youth in the church.

Youth groups often teach topics related to Christian apologetics, drawing from books by Christian thinkers such as John Lennox, C. S. Lewis, John Polkinghorne, Francis Collins and William Lane Craig.

== See also ==
- Community youth development
- Community organization
- Parachurch organization
- Sunday School
- Youth activism
- Youth culture
- Youth development
- Youth empowerment
- Youth organizations
- Youth rights
