= Butterfield, Minnesota =

City in Minnesota, United States

Butterfield
- City
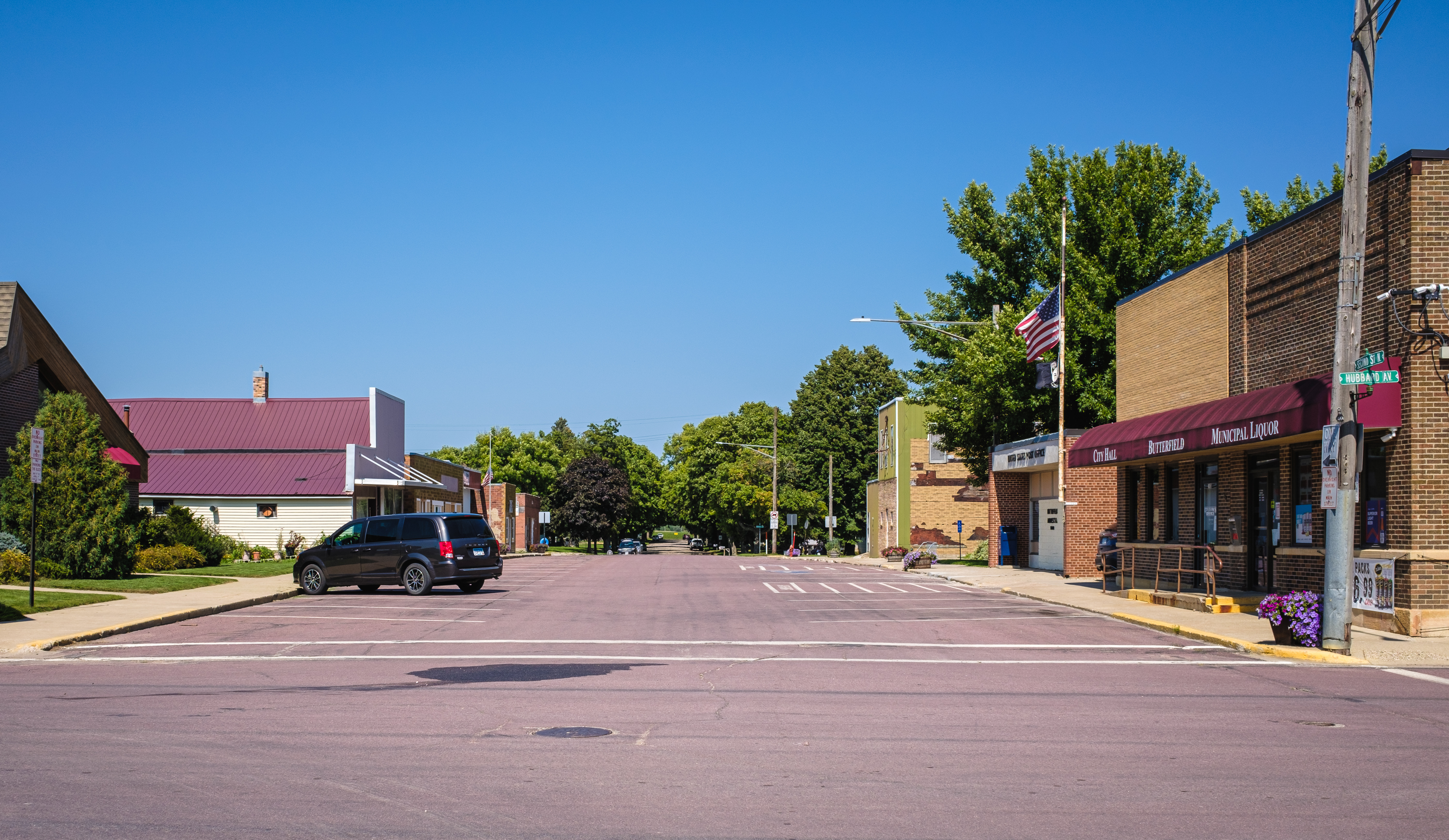
- Motto: "Home Of The Butterfield Steam And Gas Engine Show"
- Location of Butterfield, Minnesota
- Coordinates: 43°57′31″N 94°47′39″W
- Country: United States
- State: Minnesota
- County: Watonwan

Government
  - Type: Mayor-Council
  - Mayor: Phil Buhler

Area
  - Total: 0.41 sq mi (1.05 km^{2})
  - Land: 0.41 sq mi (1.05 km^{2})
  - Water: 0 sq mi (0.00 km^{2})
- Elevation: 1,188 ft (362 m)

Population (2020)
  - Total: 601
  - Density: 1,482.7/sq mi (572.46/km^{2})
- Time zone: UTC-6 (Central (CST))
  - Summer (DST): UTC-5 (CDT)
- ZIP code: 56120
- Area code: 507
- FIPS code: 27-08992
- GNIS feature ID: 2393484
- Website: www.butterfieldmn.com

Butterfield is a city in Watonwan County, Minnesota, United States. The population was 601 at the 2020 census.

== History ==
Butterfield was platted in 1872. It developed as a railroad town and was incorporated on April 5, 1885. The community was named for William Butterfield, the town site's original owner.

== Geography ==
According to the United States Census Bureau, the city has an area of 0.45 square miles (1.17 km^{2}), all land.

== Demographics ==
Historical population
Census	Pop.	Note	%±
1900	332		—
1910	377		13.6%
1920	404		7.2%
1930	412		2.0%
1940	511		24.0%
1950	529		3.5%
1960	601		13.6%
1970	619		3.0%
1980	634		2.4%
1990	509		−19.7%
2000	564		10.8%
2010	586		3.9%
2020	601		2.6%
U.S. Decennial Census

=== 2010 census ===
As of the census of 2010, there were 586 people, 220 households, and 149 families residing in the city. The population density was 1,302.2 inhabitants per square mile (502.8/km^{2}). There were 238 housing units at an average density of 528.9 per square mile (204.2/km^{2}). The racial makeup of the city was 72.7% White, 0.9% African American, 0.2% Native American, 7.3% Asian, 0.3% Pacific Islander, 17.1% from other races, and 1.5% from two or more races. Hispanic or Latino of any race were 25.6% of the population.

There were 220 households, of which 31.8% had children under the age of 18 living with them, 53.6% were married couples living together, 8.2% had a female householder with no husband present, 5.9% had a male householder with no wife present, and 32.3% were non-families. 28.2% of all households were made up of individuals, and 10.9% had someone living alone who was 65 years of age or older. The average household size was 2.66 and the average family size was 3.21.

The median age in the city was 35 years. 24.1% of residents were under the age of 18; 12% were between the ages of 18 and 24; 22.9% were from 25 to 44; 24.3% were from 45 to 64; and 16.7% were 65 years of age or older. The gender makeup of the city was 50.7% male and 49.3% female.

=== 2000 census ===
As of the census of 2000, there were 564 people, 232 households, and 152 families residing in the city. The population density was 1,289.9 inhabitants per square mile (498.0/km^{2}). There were 235 housing units at an average density of 537.5 per square mile (207.5/km^{2}). The racial makeup of the city was 86.17% White, 7.27% Asian, 5.32% from other races, and 1.24% from two or more races. Hispanic or Latino of any race were 15.07% of the population.

There were 232 households, out of which 28.4% had children under the age of 18 living with them, 55.6% were married couples living together, 6.0% had a female householder with no husband present, and 34.1% were non-families. 30.6% of all households were made up of individuals, and 16.4% had someone living alone who was 65 years of age or older. The average household size was 2.43 and the average family size was 3.03.

In the city, the population was spread out, with 24.5% under the age of 18, 10.5% from 18 to 24, 22.9% from 25 to 44, 23.6% from 45 to 64, and 18.6% who were 65 years of age or older. The median age was 40 years. For every 100 females, there were 103.6 males. For every 100 females age 18 and over, there were 102.9 males.

The median income for a household in the city was $29,904, and the median income for a family was $38,482. Males had a median income of $27,212 versus $17,813 for females. The per capita income for the city was $15,177. About 6.1% of families and 8.6% of the population were below the poverty line, including 8.1% of those under age 18 and 11.2% of those age 65 or over.

== Arts and culture ==
=== Annual cultural events ===
The Butterfield Steam and Gas Engine Show is held on the third full weekend in August. The event made its debut in 1967, and attracts an estimated 15,000 people each year.

== Infrastructure ==
=== Transportation ===
Minnesota State Highway 60 serves as a main route in the community.

The junction of Union Pacific Railroad's Worthington Subdivision and Fairmont Subdivision is east of the city limits in Butterfield Township.

== Government ==
Butterfield is in Minnesota's 1st congressional district, represented by Republican Brad Finstad.

== Notable people ==
- Herman Becker Fast (1887-1938), Minnesota state legislator, farmer, and businessman, lived in Butterfield.
- Bruce Laingen (1922-2019), diplomat, born in Butterfield.

== See also ==
- Kansas Lake Evangelical Lutheran Church
