= Fast Company (disambiguation) =

Fast Company is a business publication.

Fast Company may also refer to:

- Fast Company (1918 film), a film starring Lon Chaney Sr.
- Fast Company (1924 film), an Our Gang short
- Fast Company (1929 film), a film starring Evelyn Brent
- Fast Company (1938 film), a film featuring Melvyn Douglas and Florence Rice
- Fast Company (1953 film), a film by John Sturges
- Fast Company (1979 film), a film by David Cronenberg
- "Fast Company", a 2007 song by the Eagles from Long Road Out of Eden

== See also ==
- Fleet Antiterrorism Security Team or FAST, part of the U.S. Marine Corps Security Force Regiment
- In Fast Company (disambiguation)
- Fast (disambiguation), for companies named "Fast"
