= Herman Becker Fast =

American politician (1887–1938)

Herman Becker Fast (May 19, 1887 – December 20, 1938) was an American farmer, businessman, and politician.

Fast was born in a Mennonite farming family in Mountain Lake, Cottonwood County, Minnesota. He lived with his wife and family in Butterfield, Watonwan County, Minnesota. Fast was a farmer and was involved with the creamery cooperative and the telephone business. He served as the justice of the peace for Butterfield, Minnesota and also served on the Butterfield School Board and was the school board clerk. Fast served in the Minnesota House of Representatives in 1931 and 1932 and in 1935 and 1936.
