= Piotr Fast =

Polish literary historian

- Born: 1 November 1951 (age 74); Warsaw, Poland
- Education: Adam Mickiewicz University in Poznań
- Occupations: Professor, specialist in Russian Studies, Literary Studies scholar, Translation Studies scholar, translator
- Title: Professor

Piotr Fast (born 1 November 1951, in Warsaw) is a Polish professor, historian of Russian literature, Translation Studies scholar and translator. He graduated in Russian Studies from the Adam Mickiewicz University in Poznan in 1975. For many years he was associated with the University of Silesia in Katowice where he was hired in 1975, obtained doctor's degree in 1980, habilitated doctor’s degree in 1987), academic title of professor (1995) and performed various executive functions (including deputy rector for Student Affairs – 1990-1993). In the years 2005-2010 he acted as the rector of the College of Linguistics in Czestochowa. After that he was employed at the Tischner European University in Cracow and at the Faculty of Humanities and Social Sciences of the University of Technology and Humanities in Bielsko-Biala (2012-2014). In academic year 2014/15 he returned to the Institute of East Slavic Philology at the University of Silesia in Katowice.

He is the author of a dozen books on the history of Russian literature, co-author of the academic textbook Historia literatury rosyjskiej XX wieku (History of 20th Century Russian Literature) edited by Andrzej Drawicz and an editor of several dozen of collective works. He has published over 200 scientific and popular science articles, reviews, translations of scholarly texts and translations of Russian prose and poetry, including Iosif Brodsky, Yevgeny Rein, Nikolay Rubtsov, Yuri Druzhnikov, Ilya Ehrenburg, Alexander Woronski, and Grigory Danilevsky. Piotr Fast is the author of the volume of poetry Na Linie. Wiersze (On the Line. Poems) (2002), executive editor of the book series Studia o przekładzie (Studies on Translation), the quarterly Przegląd Rusycystyczny (Russian Studies Review) and the series Biblioteka Przeglądu Rusycystycznego (Library of Russian Studies Review).

He is a member of the Slavic Studies Committee at the Polish Academy of Sciences, the International Comparative Literature Association and the Literary Translators Association, the chairman of the Translation Committee of the International Committee of Slavists. Piotr Fast has received the award of the Minister of National Education and has been decorated with Bronze, Silver and Gold Crosses of Merit, KEN Medal, Medal of Alexander Pushkin and the Gold Badge of Merit of the University of Silesia.

Publications:

- Poetyka rosyjskiej powieści produkcyjnej (1929–1941) (Poetics of Russian Production Novel (1929–1941)) (1981)
- Nurt paraboliczny w prozie Ilji Erenburga. Między poetyką a interpretacją (Parabolic Current in Ilya Erenburg's prose. Between Poetics and Interpretation) (1987)
- "Mistrz i Małgorzata" Bułhakowa. Pisarz, epoka, powieść ("Master and Margarita" by Bulgakov. Writer, Epoch, Novel) (1991)
- Erenburg i konteksty. Studia z poetyki i historii literatury rosyjskiej (Erenburg and Contexts. Studies in the Poetics and History of Russian Literature) (1992)
- Od odwilży do pieriestrojki. Studia i szkice o najnowszej literaturze rosyjskiej (From Thaw to Perestroika. Studies and Sketches on the Latest Russian Literature) (1992)
- Spotkania z Brodskim (Meetings with Brodsky) (1996)
- Ideology, Aesthetics, Literary History. The Socialist Realism and its Others (1999)
- Spotkania z Brodskim (dawne i nowe) (Meetings with Brodsky (the Old and the New)) (2000)
- Realizm socjalistyczny w literaturze rosyjskiej. Doktryna, poetyka, konteksty (Socialist Realism in Russian Literature. Doctrine, Poetics, Contexts) (2003)
- Wczesna twórczość Anatolija Kima. Wybrane zagadnienia poetyki i interpretacji (Early Works of Anatoly Kim. Selected Issues of Poetics and Interpretation) (with Katarzyna Jastrzebska, 2006)
- Rozumem Rosji nie ogarniesz... Szkice o książkach (You Can't Understand Russia... Sketches about Books) (2010)
- Translatologiczne wyprawy i przechadzki (Translatological Expeditions and Walks) (with Alina Swiesciak, 2010)
