= FASTER (cable system) =

Trans-Pacific submarine communications cable

- Cable type: Fibre-optic
- Fate: Active
- Construction beginning: 2014
- Construction finished: 2016
- First traffic: 2016
- Design capacity: 60 Tbit/s
- Built by: NEC (supplier)
- Landing points: Oregon USA, Japan, Taiwan

FASTER is a trans-Pacific submarine communications cable that went live during the last week of June 2016. The cable has a total length of approximately 11,629 km and a capacity of 60Tb/s.

The companies involved in the project include:

- Google
- KDDI
- SingTel
- China Telecom Global
- China Mobile International
- Global Transit Communications

FASTER has landings in:

- Bandon, Oregon, USA
- Chikura, Chiba, Japan
- Shima, Mie, Japan
- Tamsui, New Taipei City, Taiwan

== See also ==
- List of international submarine communications cables
- Unity (cable system)
