= Fast Eddie =

Fast Eddie or Fast Eddy may refer to:

- Fast Eddie (nickname), the nickname of several people and fictional characters
- Fast Eddys, an Australian fast food chain
- Fast Eddie (video game), 1982
- Fast Eddie (producer), an American house producer and hip hop musician
