= Fulbright Academy =

The Fulbright Academy, also known as the Fulbright Academy of Science & Technology, was an international non-profit organization established by alumni of the Fulbright Exchange Program and others interested in science and technology innovation. It operated from 2002-2013, and Eric S. Howard served as its executive director. At the end of 2013, it merged with the Fulbright Association.

== Organisation ==
The Fulbright Academy was a virtual research institute and network, with board members and volunteers based in many countries. It had individual and institutional members worldwide. Individual members were in the natural sciences, life sciences, social sciences, and related fields. Institutional members included universities, corporations, foundations and government agencies. In 2011 it partnered with HarrisConnect and published the first ever multi-year directory of Fulbright alumni and their hosts.

== Funding ==
The Fulbright Academy raised funds from public agencies, corporations, and individuals worldwide to carry out its programs. Major support come from the German-American Fulbright Commission, the Alfred P. Sloan Foundation, the Qatar Foundation, Accenture, Monsanto, Singapore's Agency for Science Technology & Research, Panama's National Secretariat for Science Technology & Innovation, Morocco's Ministry of Higher Education & Scientific Research, and the US National Science Foundation, among others. More than two dozen public agencies in the US and abroad provided support, including government ministries and agencies in Ecuador, El Salvador, Germany, Hungary, Libya, Macedonia, Morocco, Panama, Qatar, Singapore, and United Arab Emirates, plus the UN, UNEP, and UNESCO.

== Annual Conferences ==
The Fulbright Academy facilitated dialogue among scholars and scientists by hosting annual conferences.

- First Annual Conference (2006) - Berlin, Germany
- Second Annual Conference (2007) - Panama City, Panama
- Third Annual Conference (2008) - Boston, Massachusetts, USA
- Fourth Annual Conference (2009) - Skopje, Macedonia
- Fifth Annual Conference (2010) - San Francisco, California, USA
- Sixth Annual Conference (2011) - Heidelberg, Germany
- Seventh Annual Conference (2012) - Abu Dhabi, United Arab Emirates
- Eighth Annual Conference (2013) - Montego Bay, Jamaica

== Special Programs and Workshops ==
Building on a grant from the Sloan Foundation relating to the history of science, in 2006-07, the Academy provided financial support for the publication of three anthologies of essays written by Fulbright scholars on the impact of their Fulbright experiences on their personal and professional lives. In 2008, the Academy received a Certificate of Appreciation from the US Department of State for its work on science diplomacy with North Africa. In 2010, the Academy partnered with Harris Connect on the publication of the first-ever directory of alumni and hosts of visiting scholars. In 2012, it launched the TEDxFulbright series. In 2012, the Fulbright Academy created and launched "Thank You Fulbright", a global initiative the recognize the positive impact of the Fulbright Exchange Program via an annual celebration on the birthday of Senator Fulbright and sending thank you letters to the government programs worldwide that fund the Fulbright Exchange Program.

The Fulbright Academy produced specialist conferences and workshops that led to changes in public policy.

- Fulbright Scholars in STEM (2005) - Berlin, Germany
- Digital Libraries & Digital Access for North Africa (2007) - Rabat, Morocco
- Nursing Education in the Middle East (2008) - Doha, Qatar
- Futuropolis 2058: Future of Cities (2008) - Singapore
- Corporate Sustainability (2010) - Madison, New Jersey, USA
- Digital Libraries & Digital Access for North Africa (2011) - Washington, DC, USA
- TEDxFulbright #1 (2012) - Cambridge, Massachusetts, USA
- TEDxFulbright #2 (2012) - Frankfurt, Germany

The Fulbright Academy served the needs of the alumni. It was not involved in the selection of Fulbright scholars or in the administration of the Fulbright Exchange program.
