= Luther League =

American Lutheran religious association

The Luther League was a Lutheran religious association for young people in the United States. It began with a local society founded by delegates of six Lutheran church societies in New York City in 1888. The first national convention was held in Pittsburgh, Pennsylvania, on 30 and 31 October 1895.

The basis of the league was the Augsburg Confession. Its membership was open to any society of whatever name connected with a Lutheran congregation or a Lutheran institution of learning. According to the constitution, its objects were to encourage the formation of the young people's societies in all Lutheran congregations in America, to urge their affiliation with their respective state or territorial leagues, and with this league to stimulate the various young people's societies to greater Christian activity and to foster the spirit of loyalty to the church. The league published a monthly paper, The Luther League Review, in Washington,D.C. According to its official report, it had 70,000 members in 1906, which had increased to more than 100,000 in 1910.

The League was active in the development of intersynodical friendships and creation of the United Lutheran Church in America in 1920. It then became the official youth organization of the united Church.

The association was disbanded in 1918, a few years after reaching its 100,000 member milestone.

== See also ==
- Catholic Youth Organization
