= List of lighthouses in Japan =

This is a list of Japanese lighthouses.

The use of lighting for marine navigation in Japan dates back to 664 CE when it has been recorded that fires were built on the Iki Islands facing the Tsushima Strait to guide a diplomatic envoy arriving from China.

Modern Japanese lighthouse history dates back to 1854 when U.S. Commodore Matthew C. Perry arrived in Edo Harbor and signed the Convention of Kanagawa with the Tokugawa Shogunate, opening Japan to western trade, and precipitated similar agreements with other western countries stipulating the construction of 8 permanent lighthouses for safe navigation. French naval engineer Léonce Verny was engaged by the Meiji government to build the first lighthouse, completing the Kannonzaki Lighthouse in 1869. Noted Scottish civil engineer and lighthouse builder Richard Henry Brunton was brought in to take over the project in 1868, and is today known as the "Father of Japanese lighthouses" for his 26 lighthouses built over a 7 and a half year period.

Japanese engineer Fujikura Kentatsu trained under Brunton to build the first Japanese designed lighthouse in 1884 at Nangō in Miyazaki. Today, there are 67 Meiji-era lighthouses still active, many which have been designated as important cultural assets.

According to the Japan Coast Guard, the agency responsible for the maintenance and operation of official Japanese lighthouses, there are currently 3,118 active lighthouses in Japan as of March 2022.

== Active lighthouses ==
Name	Image	Built	Location	Characteristic	NGA number	Admiralty number
Anorisaki Lighthouse		1948	Agochō-Anori	Fl W 15s	112-6356	M6042
Iyo-aoshima Lighthouse		24 Mar 1970	Ōzu-shi	Fl(2) W 8s	112-9144	M5644.4
Arasaki Lighthouse		1 Jan 1903	Tsuruoka	Fl W 5s	112-3464	M7087
Eboshijima Lighthouse		1 Aug 1875	Itoshima	Fl W 15s	112-12276	M5262
Enoshima Sea Candle		31 Dec 2002	Samuel Cocking Garden	Fl W 10s	112-5404	M6332
Esaki Lighthouse		14 Jun 1871	Awaji	Al W R 10s	112-7648	M5796
Fukura Lighthouse		1952	Ishikawa Prefecture	Fl W 12s	112-2792	M7220
Hesaki Lighthouse		1871	Fukuoka Prefecture, Kitakyūshū-shi	F Fl W 15s	112-9766	M5312
Inubōsaki Lighthouse		15 Nov 1874	Suigō-Tsukuba Quasi-National Park	Fl W 15s	112-4780	M6478
Iojimazaki Lighthouse		1954	Nagasaki	Fl(4) W 20s	112-11792	M5194
Irago Lighthouse		1929	Tahara	Iso W 6s	112-5812	M6052
Irōzaki Lighthouse		1871	Minamiizu	Al Fl W R 16s	112-5572	M6270
Jōgashima Lighthouse		1870	Miura	Fl W 15s	112-5368	M6343
Kakezuka Lighthouse		1880	Iwata	Iso W 6s	112-5792	M6224
Kannonsaki Lighthouse		11 Feb 1869	Kannonzaki Park	Fl(2) W 15s	112-5076	M6360
Kashinosaki Lighthouse		8 Jul 1870	Kushimoto	Gp Fl (2) 20s	112-6756	M5998
Kinkasan Lighthouse		May 1876	Ayukawahama	Al Fl W R 20s	112-4344	M6546
Kurasaki Lighthouse		1884	Miyazaki Prefecture	Fl (2) W 20s	112-10868	M4864
Mikomotoshima Lighthouse		1 Jan 1871	Mikomoto Island	Fl(2) W 16s	112-5548	M6290
Mitarai-kō Lighthouse		1830	Ōsakishimojima	Iso G 6s	112-8848	M5697
Mizunokojima Lighthouse		1904	Saiki	Fl W 10s	112-10464	M4912
Mutsurejima Lighthouse		1871	Yamaguchi Prefecture, Shimonoseki	Fl W 10s	112-9944	M5334
Nojimasaki Lighthouse		1869	Minami Bōsō Quasi-National Park	Fl W 15s	112-4992	M6456
Nomazaki Lighthouse		3 Oct 1921	Mihama	Iso W 6s	112-6108	M6144
Nosappumisaki Lighthouse		1872	Nemuro	Iso WR 4s	112-0448	M6840
Nyudozaki Lighthouse		1951	Oga	Fl W 15s	112-3604	M7058
Ōbaehana Lighthouse		1958	Hirado	Iso W 6s	112-12012	M5239.5
Ogami Lighthouse		1966	Hirado, Nagasaki Prefecture	Fl W 4s	112-11984	M5240
Omaesaki Lighthouse		1874	Omaezaki	Fl W 4s	112-5770	M6234.5
Ōmazaki Lighthouse		1921	Ōma-machi	Fl(3) W 30s	112-3832	M6634
Rokkōsaki Lighthouse		1883	Suzu	Iso W 6s	112-2888	M7196
Satamisaki Lighthouse		18 Oct 1871	Minamiōsumi-chō	Fl(2) W 16s	112-10912	M4836
Shionomisaki Lighthouse		1870	Kushimoto	Fl W 15s	112-6776	M5994
Shirasu Lighthouse		1873	Kokurakita-ku	Fl W 4s	112-9960	M5328
Shiriyazaki Lighthouse		1876	Higashidōri-mura	Fl W 10s	112-3860	M6628
Sugashima Lighthouse		1873	Toba	Fl W 4s	112-6328	M6048
Sunosaki Lighthouse		1919	Tateyama	Al Fl W R 30s	112-5004	M6452
Tappisaki Lighthouse		1932	Sotogahama, Aomori Prefecture	Fl W 20s	112-3704	M6662
Tomogashima Lighthouse		1872	Wakayama	Alt RW 10s	112-7200	M5960
Tsunoshima Lighthouse		1876	Shimonoseki	Fl W 5s	112-1568	M7397
Tsurugisaki Lighthouse		1871	Miura	Al Fl(2+1) WG 30s	112-5044	M6354
Tsurushima Lighthouse		1873	Matsuyama	Al Fl W R 16s	112-9128	M5436
Wakkanai Lighthouse		1900	Wakkanai	Fl(2) W 20s fl 6s, ec 14s	112-1476	M6109
Yokohama Marine Tower		15 Jan 1961	Yamashitachō	Al Fl R G 20s	112-5196	M6400

== Preserved historic lighthouses ==
Name	Image	Built	Location	Characteristic	NGA number	Admiralty number
Akashi Port Old Lighthouse		1657	Akashi			
Former Anorisaki Lighthouse		1 Apr 1873	Museum of Maritime Science			
Former Fukura Lighthouse		1876	Ishikawa Prefecture			
Funabashi Daijingū Lighthouse		1880	Ōhi Shrine			
Meiji Maru Lightship		24 Nov 1874	Etchūjima			
Old Sakai Lighthouse		1877	Sakai-ku	F G		
Former Sakata Lighthouse		20 Oct 1895	Hiyoriyama Park			
Shinagawa Lighthouse		5 Apr 1870	Museum Meiji-mura	F R		

== Japanese lighthouses in former territories ==
Name	Image	Built	Location	Characteristic	NGA number	Admiralty number
Garapan Lighthouse		1934	Saipan			
Nakashiretoko Lighthouse		1939	Sakhalin Oblast	Fl(2) W	112-168	M7842
Poluwat Lighthouse		1938	Poluwat			

== See also ==
- Lists of lighthouses and lightvessels
- List of tallest structures in Japan
- Fifty lighthouses in Japan — Lighthouses poll by Japan Coast Guard (in Japanese)
- Big Joys, Small Sorrows Keisuke Kinoshita's 1986 film about Japanese lighthouses
