= Sunosaki Lighthouse =

Sunosaki Lighthouse Suno Saki 洲崎灯台
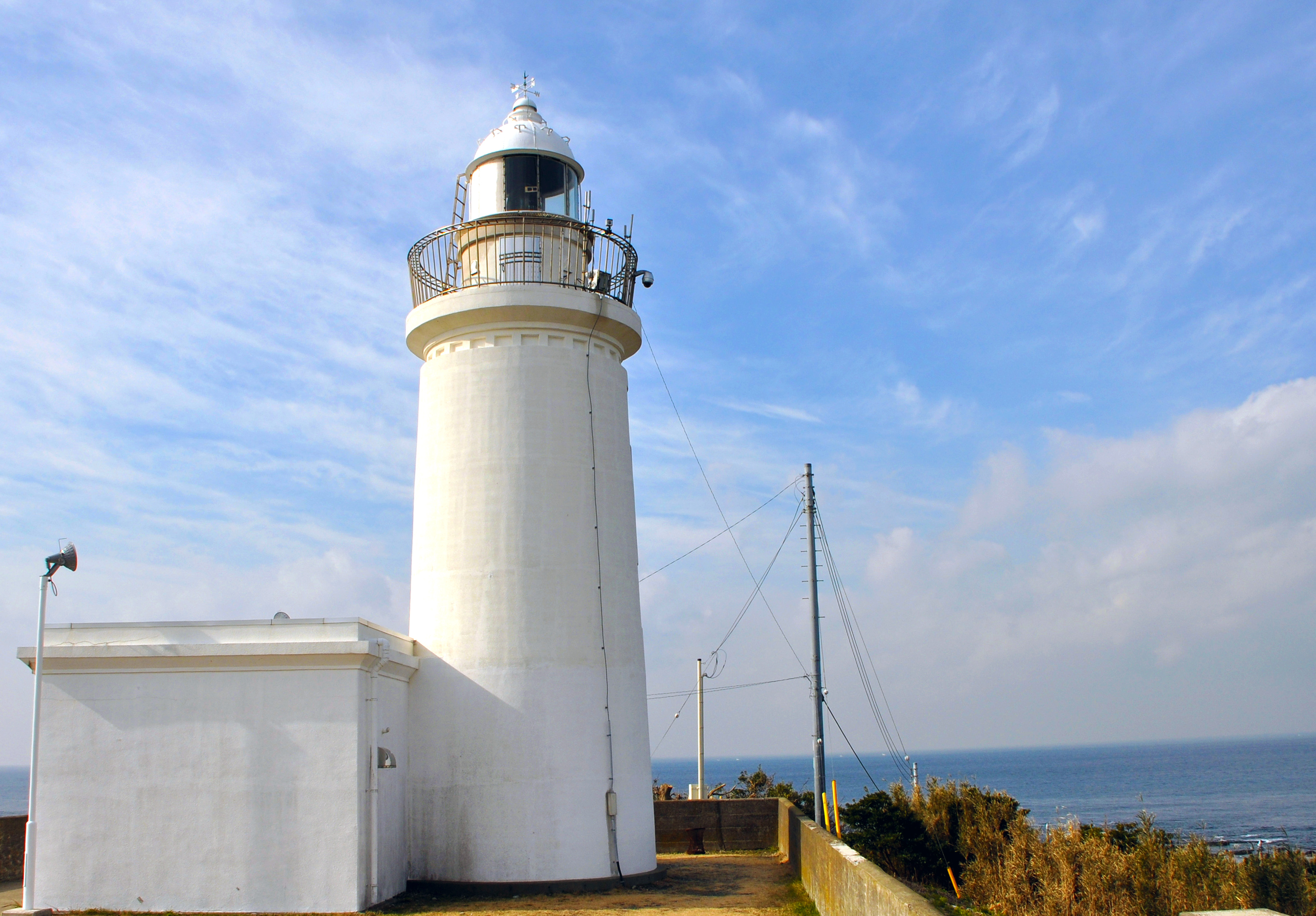
- Sunosaki Lighthouse
- Location: Tateyama; Chiba Prefecture; Japan
- Coordinates: 34°58′31.3″N 139°45′27.4″E

Tower
- Constructed: 1919
- Foundation: concrete base
- Construction: concrete tower
- Height: 14.8 metres (49 ft)
- Shape: cylindrical tower with balcony and lantern
- Heritage: Registered Tangible Cultural Property of Japan

Light
- First lit: 15 December 1919
- Focal height: 45.1 metres (148 ft)
- Lens: Fresnel
- Intensity: 97,000 candela
- Range: 18.5 kilometres (10.0 nmi)
- Characteristic: Al Fl W R 30s.
- Japan no.: JCG-2003

Sunosaki Lighthouse (洲崎灯台, Sunosaki tōdai) is a lighthouse located in the city of Tateyama, Chiba Prefecture, Japan at the southern tip of the Bōsō Peninsula.

== History ==
Sunosaki Lighthouse was first lit on December 15, 1919, and completes the navigational aid systems for all vessels entering Uraga Channel and Tokyo Bay, with Kannonzaki Lighthouse and Tsurugisaki Lighthouse on the western side of Miura Peninsula, and the Nojimazaki Lighthouse and the Sunosaki Lighthouse on the eastern side of the Bōsō Peninsula.

The building is a cylindrical white structure with a height of 15 meters. The building and its supporting base are made from concrete. The focal height of the light is 45 meters above sea level.

The music video for the AKB48 song "Aitakatta" was filmed here.

== See also ==
- List of lighthouses in Japan
