= Uraga Channel =

Waterway connecting Tokyo Bay and Sagami Gulf

Coordinates: 35.20187°N 139.79279°E

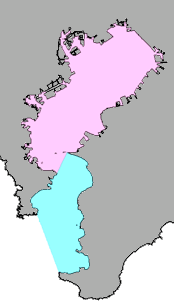
The Uraga Channel is the zone marked in blue. Tokyo Bay, in a narrow sense, is the zone marked in pink; and Tokyo Bay, in a broad sense, is the larger zone of pink plus blue together.

The Uraga Channel (浦賀水道, Uraga-suidō) is a waterway connecting Tokyo Bay to the Sagami Gulf. It is an important channel for ships headed from Tokyo, Yokohama, and Chiba to the Pacific Ocean and beyond.

== Geography ==
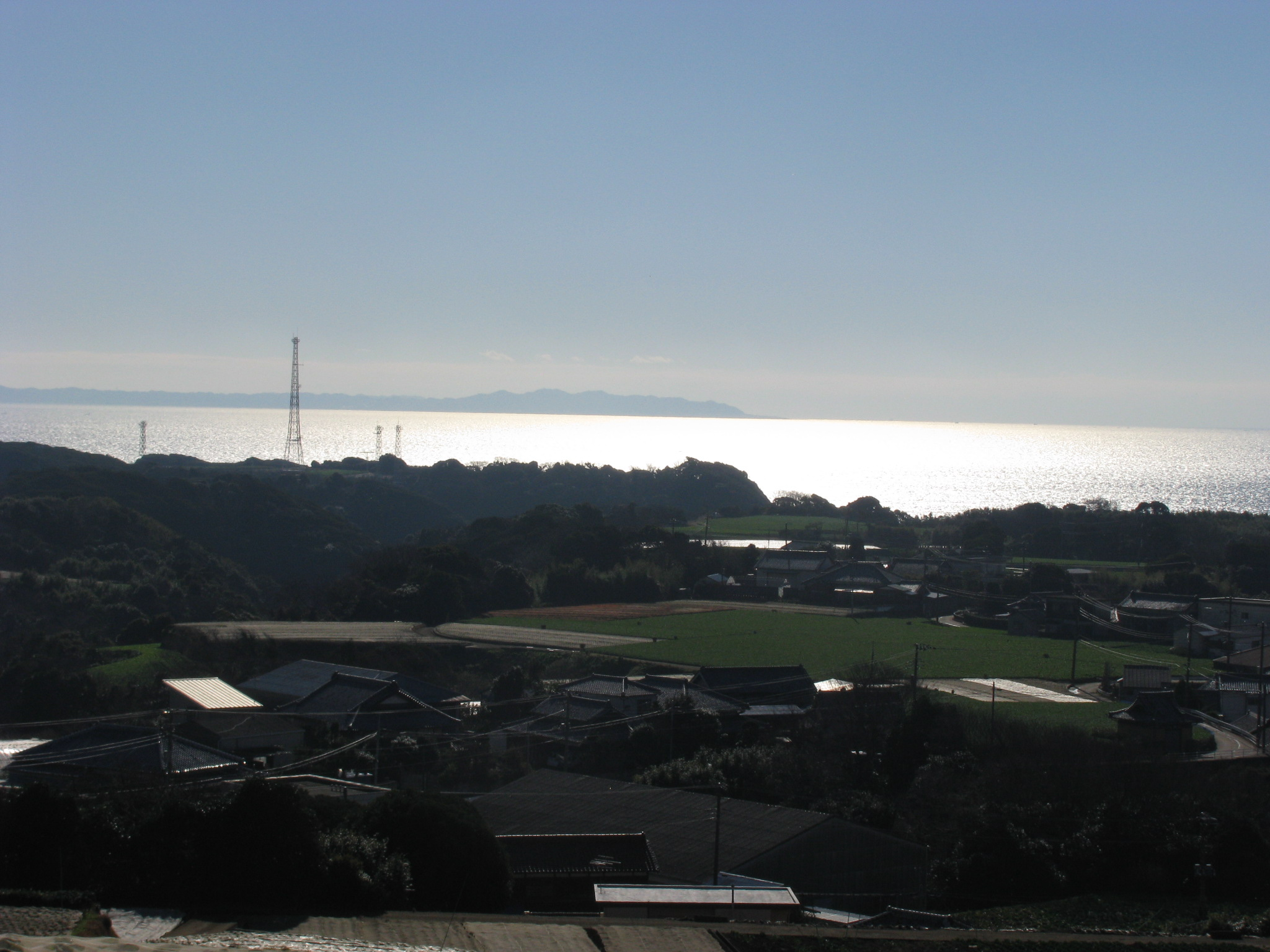
Uraga Channel. Looking at the Boso Peninsula from the Miura Peninsula.

The Uraga channel is at the southern end of Tokyo Bay (formerly known as Edo Bay, prior to 1868).

Tokyo Bay is surrounded by the Bōsō Peninsula (Chiba Prefecture) to the east and the Miura Peninsula (Kanagawa Prefecture) to the west. In a narrow sense, Tokyo Bay is the area north of the straight line formed by the Cape Kannon (観音崎, Kannon-zaki) on the Miura Peninsula on one end and Cape Futtsu (富津岬, Futtsu-misaki) on the Boso Peninsula on the other end. This area covers about 922 km². Tokyo Bay, in a broader sense, would be understood to include the Uraga Channel as well (its southwestern demarcation being the straight line between the Tsurugisaki Lighthouse and Sunosaki Lighthouse); and the total area of the bay would then be 1320 km².

The city of Uraga is located at the northern end of the channel on the Miura Peninsula. Due to its strategic location at the entrance of Edo Bay, Uraga has often been the first point of contact between visiting foreign ships and Japan.

At its narrowest, between Cape Kannon and Futtsu Point, the channel is 6 km wide. During the late Edo period, it was defended against foreign ships by twelve artillery batteries on both the Bōsō Peninsula and Miura Peninsula.

== History ==
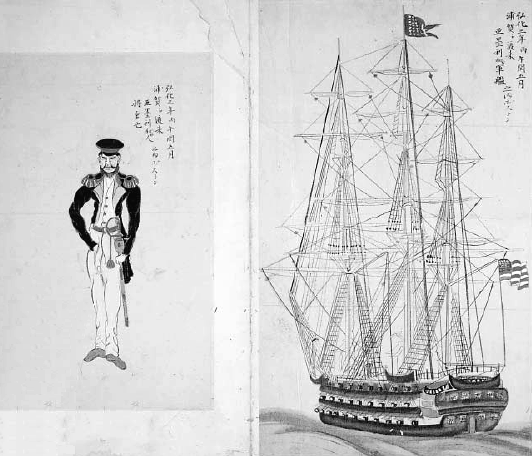
The USS Vincennes and an unidentified American crewman in Tokyo Bay (then known as Edo Bay). The work was created by a Japanese artist of the period.

In 1846, Captain James Biddle of the U.S. Navy anchored two warships, the USS Columbus and the USS Vincennes in Uraga Channel at the mouth to Tokyo Bay. This was a step in what turned out to be an unsuccessful effort to open Japan to trade with the United States.

On July 14, 1853, Commodore Matthew Perry lowered the anchor of the squadron the Japanese called the Black Ships near Uraga at Kurihama (in present-day Yokosuka in Kanagawa Prefecture) at the mouth of the channel. On the return of the Commodore's squadron in 1854, the ships by-passed Uraga to anchor closer to Edo at Kanagawa, which is where the city of Yokohama now stands.
