= Ogami (disambiguation) =

Ogami is a dialect spoken on Ogami Island

Ogami may also refer to:

- Ogami Daigoro, a protagonist in the manga series Lone Wolf and Cub
- Ogami Ichiro, a protagonist in the video game series Sakura Wars
- Ogami Ittō, a protagonist in the manga series Lone Wolf and Cub
- Ogami Island, one of the islands of the Miyako Islands
- Ogami Lighthouse, a lighthouse located on (a different) Ogami Island
- Reiji Oogami, a character in the video game series The King of Fighters

== See also ==
- Megami (disambiguation)
