= Kinkasan Lighthouse =

Kinkasan Lighthouse 金華山灯台
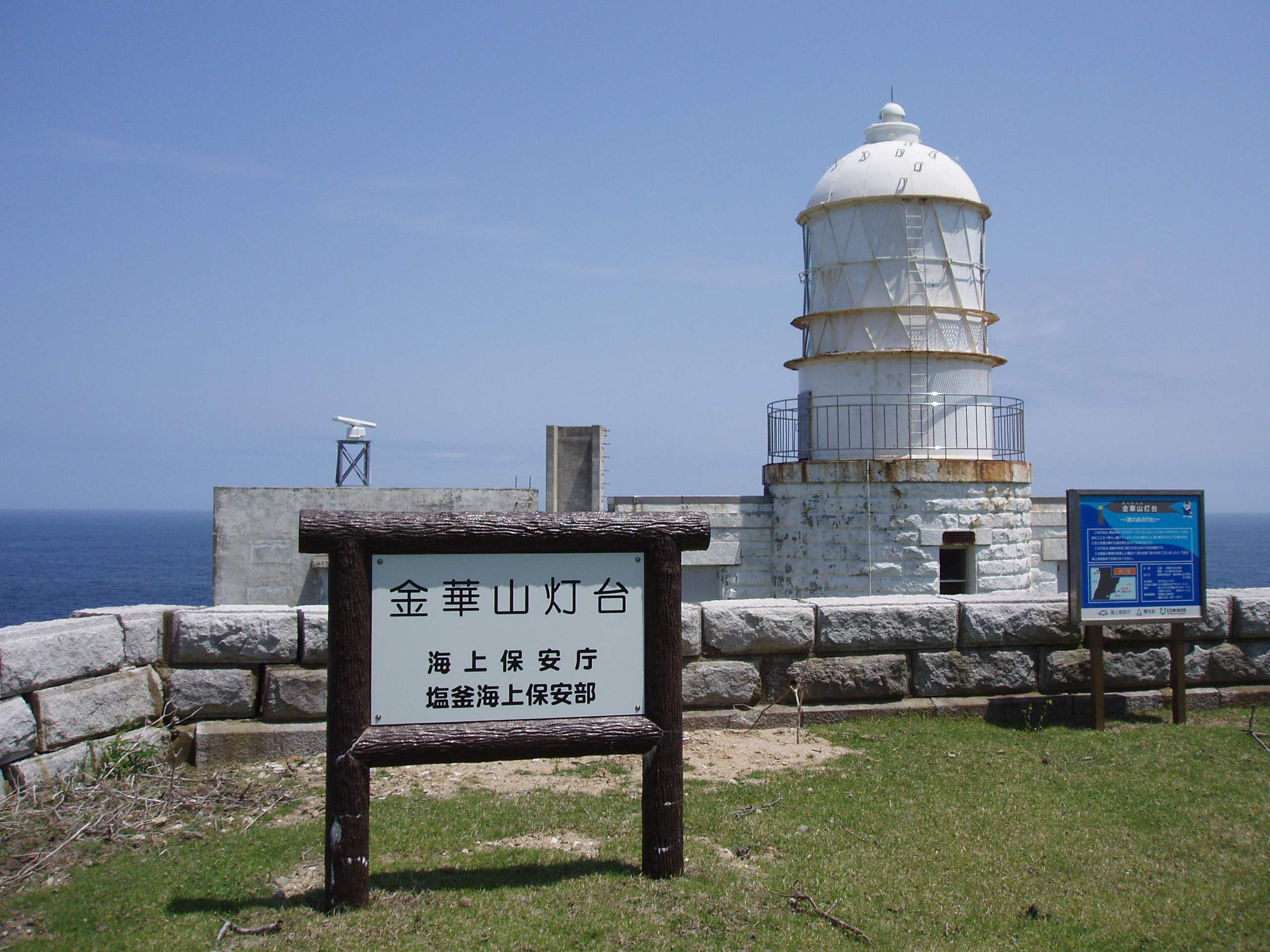
- Kinkasan Lighthouse
- Location: Kinkasan; Oshika Peninsula; Ishinomaki, Miyagi; Japan
- Coordinates: 38°16′36″N 141°35′03″E

Tower
- Constructed: 1876
- Construction: granite tower
- Automated: 2005
- Height: 54.6 metres (179 ft)
- Shape: cylindrical tower with balcony and lantern
- Markings: white tower and lantern
- Heritage: Registered Tangible Cultural Property of Japan

Light
- First lit: November 1, 1876
- Focal height: 12.82 metres (42.1 ft)
- Lens: Second order Fresnel
- Intensity: 320,000 cd
- Range: 20 nautical miles (37 km; 23 mi)
- Characteristic: Al Fl W R 20s.
- Japan no.: JCG-1728

Kinkasan Lighthouse (金華山灯台, Kinkasan tōdai) is a lighthouse on Kinkasan, an island off the Oshika Peninsula in Ishinomaki, Miyagi, Japan.

The Kinkasan Lighthouse was one of 26 lighthouses designed and built in Meiji period Japan by the British engineer Richard Henry Brunton. Work began in March 1874. It was completed and lit on November 1, 1876, eight months after Brunton left Japan.

The lighthouse was destroyed from July to August 1945 by the United States Navy during World War II, but was rebuilt in February 1946. It was completely automated on April 1, 2005.

== See also ==
- List of lighthouses in Japan
