= Old Sakai Lighthouse =

Old Sakai Lighthouse 旧堺燈台
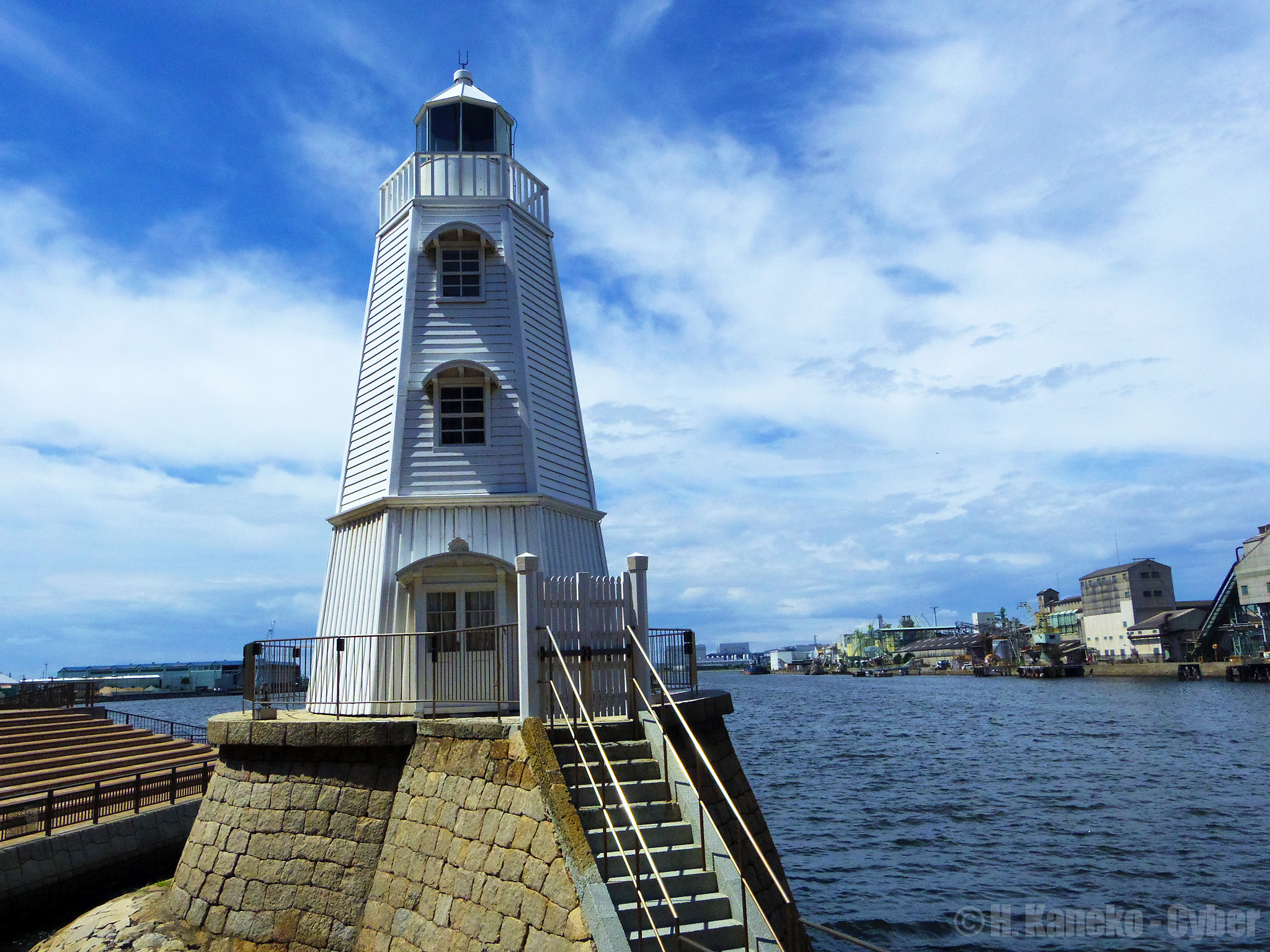
- Location: Sakai-ku, Japan
- Coordinates: 34°35′01″N 135°27′32″E

Tower
- Constructed: 1877
- Construction: wood (tower), rubble masonry (foundation)
- Height: 11.3 m (37 ft)
- Shape: hexagon
- Heritage: Historic Site of Japan

Light
- First lit: 15 September 1877
- Deactivated: 29 January 1968
- Characteristic: F G

Sakai Lighthouse (堺燈台, Sakai tōdai) is a wooden lighthouse located in Sakai-ku, Sakai Osaka Prefecture, Japan. It claims to be the oldest wooden lighthouse in Japan, and was designated a National Monument in 1972.

== History ==
Sakai has been a major port city since the Sengoku period, and Edo Period records state that a lighthouse was first built at Sakai in 1689 as a donation by a city merchant. The lighthouse was rebuilt or relocated seven times during the Edo Period, due to changes in the geography of Sakai port due to sedimentation and urban development. After the Meiji restoration, the need for a new and more modern lighthouse was realized with increased commerce and due to the demands of western merchants. This was highlighted in January 1868, when US Admiral Henry H. Bell drowned in Osaka Bay while on a mission to force the Japanese government to open Hyōgo port to foreign trade.

The lighthouse at Sakai was completed in 1877 for use as a navigational sign for ships entering and leaving Sakai Port. The lighthouse was constructed with private funds raised by a Sakai merchant named Takayama Yasujiro and other local notables. The hexagonal wooden four-story structure is 11.3 meters tall and was designed by a British architect named Biggleston, with local masons and carpenters. The lamp was green and was fixed, with an oil lamp as the light source, and was imported from France. The lighthouse remained in use until January 29, 1968. It was preserved as one of the symbols of the city of Sakai.

The lighthouse is about a 15-minute walk from Sakai Station on the Nankai Electric Railway Nankai Main Line.

== See also ==
- List of Historic Sites of Japan (Osaka)
- List of lighthouses in Japan
