= Tsurushima Lighthouse =

Tsurishima Lighthouse Turu Sima 釣島灯台
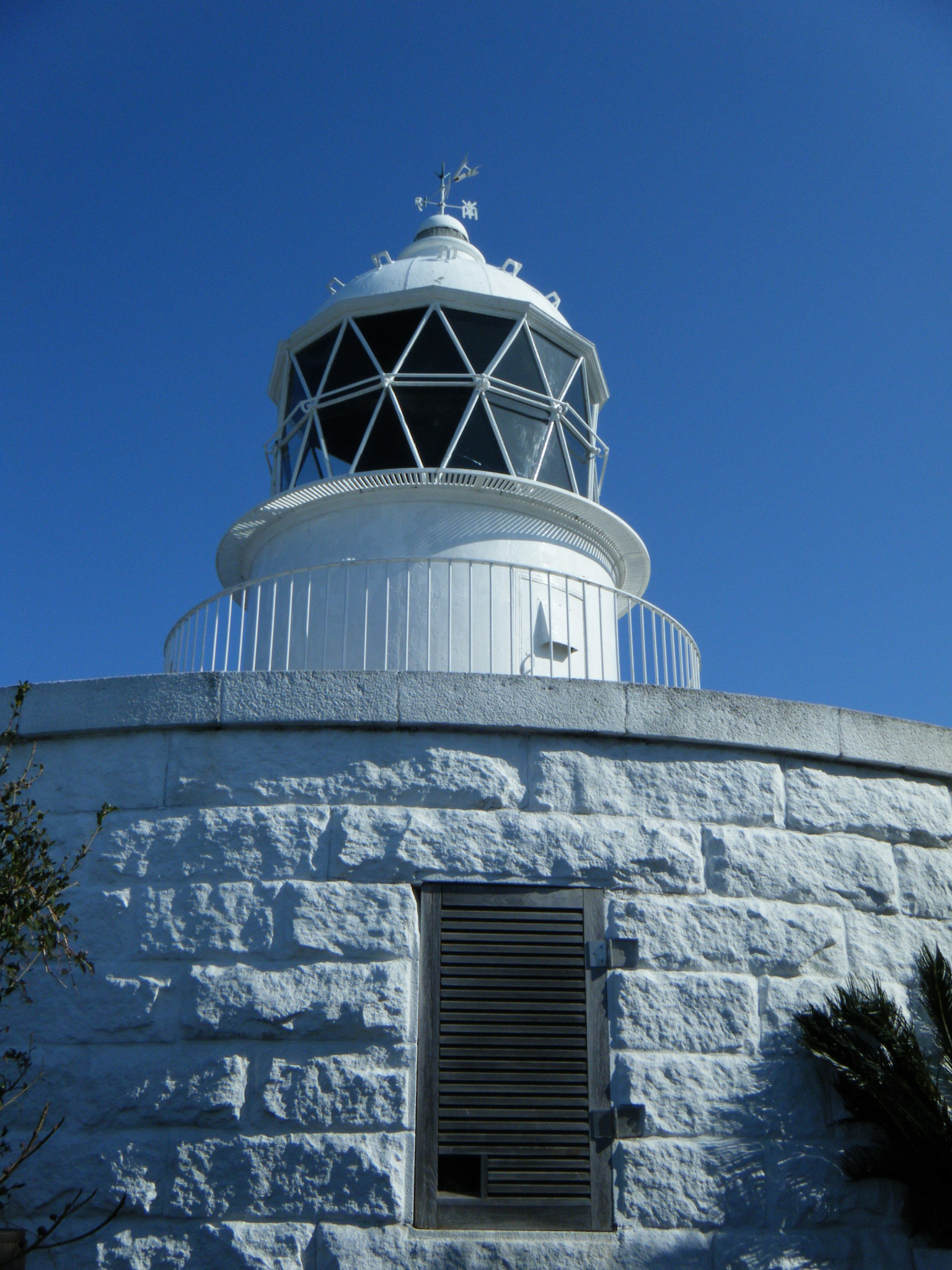
- Location: Tsurushima; Matsuyama, Ehime; Japan
- Coordinates: 33°53′34.9″N 132°38′19.5″E

Tower
- Constructed: June 15, 1873
- Construction: stone tower
- Height: 10.3 metres (34 ft)
- Shape: cylindrical tower with balcony and lantern
- Markings: white tower and lantern
- Heritage: Important Cultural Property

Light
- Focal height: 58.2 metres (191 ft)
- Intensity: white: 310,000 Candela red: 120,000 Candela
- Range: 20.5 nautical miles (38.0 km; 23.6 mi)
- Characteristic: Al Fl W R 16s.
- Japan no.: 4901

Tsurishima Lighthouse (釣島灯台, tsurushima tōdai) is a lighthouse on the island of Tsurushima, which is administered by Matsuyama, Ehime, Japan.

== History ==
This lighthouse was one of those designed by Richard Henry Brunton, who worked for the government of Japan in the Meiji period to help them construct lighthouses to allow foreign ships to come to Japan safely. It was made of stone. Work began in October 1871. It was first lit on June 15, 1873. The lighthouse became unmanned in April 1963.

== See also ==
- List of lighthouses in Japan
