= Tomogashima Lighthouse =

Tomogashima Lighthouse Tomoga Sima 友ヶ島灯台
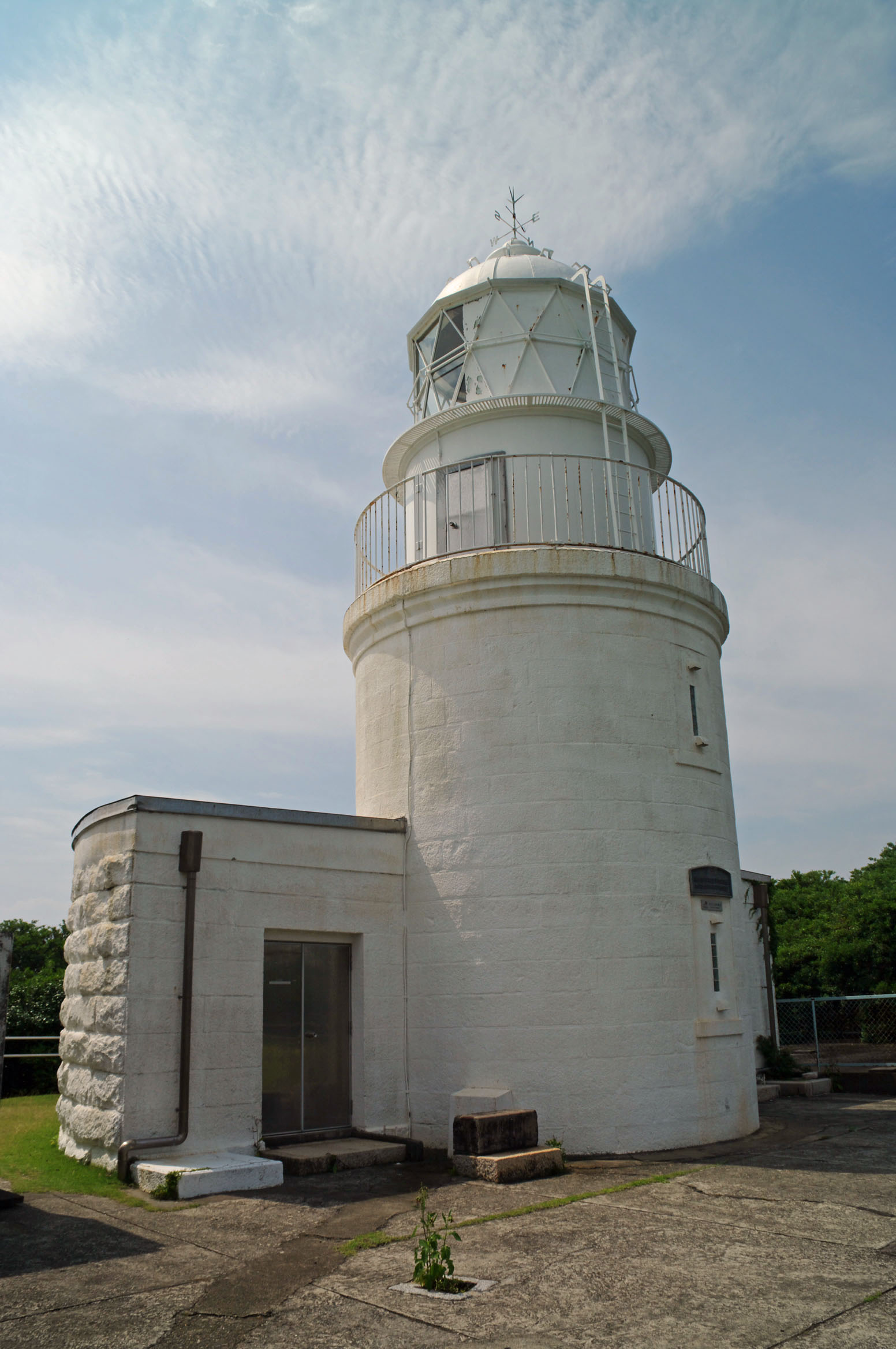
- Location: Tomogashima; Wakayama, Wakayama; Japan
- Coordinates: 34°16′51.6″N 135°00′01.3″E

Tower
- Constructed: August 1, 1872
- Construction: stone tower
- Height: 12.2 metres (40 ft)
- Shape: cylindrical tower with balcony and lantern
- Markings: white tower and lantern
- Heritage: Registered Tangible Cultural Property of Japan

Light
- First lit: 1 August 1872
- Focal height: 60 metres (200 ft)
- Intensity: white: 1,900,000 Candela red: 760,000
- Range: 20.5 nautical miles (23.6 mi; 38.0 km)
- Characteristic: Alt R W 10s.
- Japan no.: JCG-3501

Tomogashima Lighthouse (友ヶ島灯台, tomogashima tōdai) is a lighthouse on the island of Tomogashima in Wakayama, Wakayama, Japan.

== History ==
Work began in May 1870. The lighthouse was first lit on August 1, 1872. It was one of the lighthouses designed by Richard Henry Brunton, who was hired by the government of Japan at the start of the Meiji period to help construct lighthouses in Japan to make it safe for foreign ships.

== See also ==
- List of lighthouses in Japan
