= Mikomotoshima Lighthouse =

Mikomotoshima Lighthouse 神子元島灯台
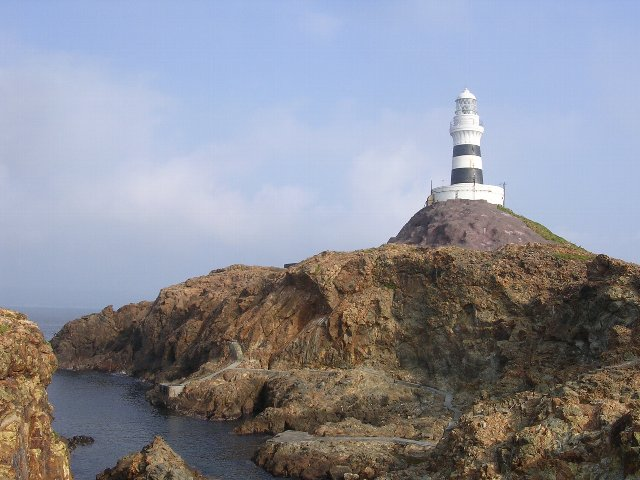
- Mikomotojima Lighthouse
- Location: Mikomoto Island, Mikomoto Island, Shimoda, Japan
- Coordinates: 34°34′31″N 138°56′29″E

Tower
- Constructed: 1 January 1871
- Construction: Izu stone, brick, concrete
- Height: 23.31 m (76.5 ft)
- Shape: truncated cone
- Markings: Stripe (black and white)
- Heritage: Historic Site of Japan

Light
- First lit: 1 January 1871
- Focal height: 50.79 m (166.6 ft)
- Lens: third order Fresnel lens
- Intensity: 400,000 candela
- Range: 19.5 nmi (36.1 km; 22.4 mi)
- Characteristic: Fl(2) W 16s
- Japan no.: JCG-2447

Mikomotojima Lighthouse (神子元島灯台, Mikomotojima tōdai) is a lighthouse located on Mikomotojima, a small (0.1 km^{2}) uninhabited islet located 11 kilometres (5.9 nmi) south of Shimoda port, Shizuoka Prefecture, Japan.The site was designated a National Historic Site in 1937.

== History ==
The Mikomotojima Lighthouse was one of eight lighthouses to be built in Meiji period Japan under the provisions of the Anglo-Japanese Treaty of Amity and Commerce of 1858, signed by the Bakumatsu period Tokugawa Shogunate. The lighthouse was designed and constructed by British engineer Richard Henry Brunton, and is noteworthy in that it is the first concrete structure to have been built in Japan. Brunton went on to construct another 25 lighthouses from far northern Hokkaidō to southern Kyūshū during his career in Japan.

This lighthouse was one of the first that Brunton designed and was also one of the most difficult to design. The island is situated in a turbulent part of the sea, and the sides of the island are very steep. Brunton wrote in an 1871 essay that:

The lighthouse is of stone, 58 feet high to the sole-plate of the lantern. It is in the shape of a truncated cone and is surmounted by a capital having twenty-four Gothic arched recesses round it. The diameter at the base is 22 feet and at the top 16 feet. The thickness of the walls at the base is 6 feet and at the top 3 feet. It is fitted with a spiral staircase of keyaki. The light shows all-round the horizon, and a red ray of 55" is inserted, which covers all dangers between it and the shore. The work of cutting away the rock to prepare for the foundations of the tower was commenced in April 1869, and the lighthouse was first illuminated on 1 January 1871.

The lighthouse is white with two black horizontal lines. The stone structure sands on a rocky islet with an elevation of 39 meters. The tower is accompanied by structures for the lighthouse keeper, and two warehouses, and there are stone walls to serve as windbreaks and for protection against waves. The stone blocks were cut from the Ebisuzaki quarry in Shimoda and are connected by iron bars, with lead poured into the gaps to secure the reinforcing bars. The lighthouse was first lit on January 1, 1871, in a ceremony attended by British consul-general Sir Harry Smith Parkes, and Japanese officials Prince Sanjō Sanetomi, Ōkubo Toshimichi and Ōkuma Shigenobu.

The Mikomotojima Lighthouse is currently the oldest lighthouse still in use in Japan, and is the only one of the eight designated by the 1858 treaty to survive. It is registered with the International Association of Lighthouse Authorities as one of the “One Hundred Most Important Lighthouses in the World” and by the Japanese government as a National Historic Monument. It can be reached in about 35 minutes by boat from Shimoda Port.

== Important Bird Area ==
The island has been recognised as an Important Bird Area (IBA) by BirdLife International because it supports a seabird colony of Japanese murrelets.

== See also ==
- List of lighthouses in Japan
- List of Historic Sites of Japan (Shizuoka)
