= Rokkosaki Lighthouse =

Rokkōsaki Lighthouse
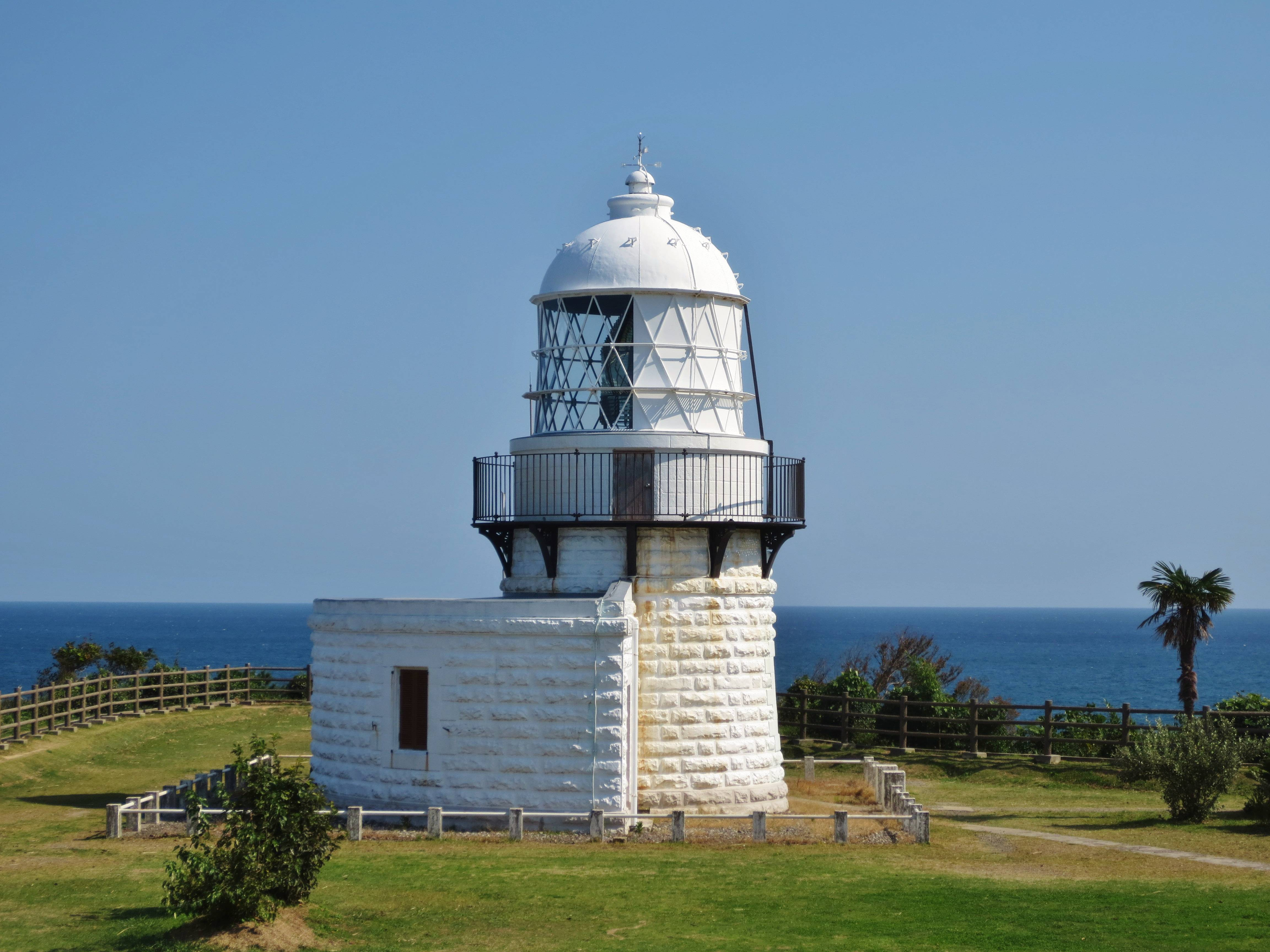
- Location: Suzu, Ishikawa, Japan
- Coordinates: 37°31′44″N 137°19′35″E

Tower
- Constructed: 1883
- Construction: stone
- Automated: 1963
- Shape: cylindrical

Light
- Lens: Fresnel Lens
- Intensity: 55,000 cd
- Range: 33 km

The Rokkosaki Lighthouse is a lighthouse located in Suzu, Ishikawa, Japan. Because of its location in the Noroshi neighborhood of Suzu, it is also called the Noroshi Lighthouse. The lighthouse's important cultural history has led it to be named as an A Rank on the "Lighthouse Preservation" list of lighthouses built during the Meiji Period. It has also been selected as one of "Japan's 50 Lighthouse," a survey conducted in 1998 asking respondents around Japan for their favorite lighthouse. In 2017, the lighthouse was selected as a "Lighthouse of Love".

The Rokkosaki Lighthouse is also unusual because, unlike many lighthouses that flash via a rotating lens, it has a fixed lens with a shielding that rotates around it.

The lighthouse is located in the Noto Hantō Quasi-National Park and atop 50-meter-tall (160 ft) sheer cliffs that rise above the Sea of Japan. At the base of the cliffs extend "senjoujiki" wave-cut platforms formed by the erosive effect of strong waves.

== History ==
The Rokkosaki Lighthouse was completed in 1883. The design of the lighthouse is often accredited to Richard Henry Brunton, the "Father of Japanese lighthouse" due to its remarkable similarity to other lighthouses Brunton designed. This is sometimes contested, however, due to the fact that Brunton returned to Scotland in 1876, seven years before the completion of the Rokkosaki Lighthouse.

The white stones used to build the lighthouse were quarried in Anamizu, transported to Noroshi on ships, then lifted to the top of the cliffs via a cable system. The time-consuming process took about two years to complete.
