= Shirasu Lighthouse =

Shirasu Lighthouse Sira Su 白州灯台
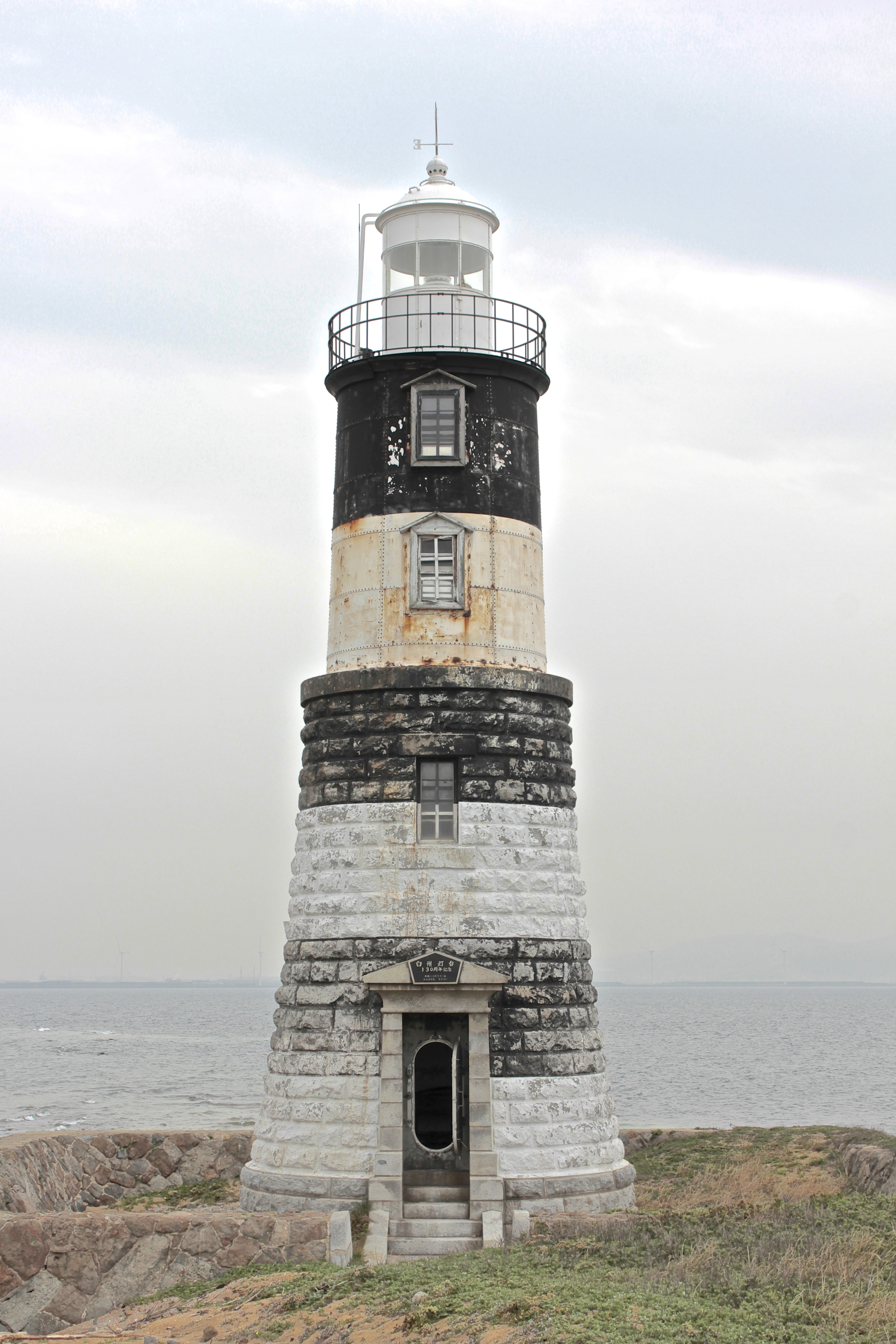
- Shirasu Lighthouse
- Location: Ainoshima; Kokurakita-ku, Kitakyūshū; Japan
- Coordinates: 33°59′01.2″N 130°47′30.4″E

Tower
- Constructed: September 1, 1873 (first)
- Construction: stone tower
- Height: 16.7 metres (55 ft)
- Shape: 2-stage cylindrical tower with gallery and lantern
- Markings: black and white bands tower, white lantern

Light
- First lit: 1900 (current)
- Focal height: 16 metres (52 ft)
- Intensity: 800 cd
- Range: 12.5 nautical miles (23.2 km; 14.4 mi)
- Characteristic: Fl W 4s.
- Japan no.: JCG-5544

Shirasu Lighthouse (白州灯台, shirasu tōdai) is a lighthouse on the island of Ainoshima, which is administered by Kokurakita-ku, Kitakyūshū, Japan. Work began in March 1872. The permanent light was lit 1 September 1873. It was one of the lighthouses designed by Richard Henry Brunton, who was hired by the government of Japan to help construct lighthouses to make coastal waters safe for foreign ships to approach, after Japan opened up to the West.

== See also ==
- List of lighthouses in Japan
