= Iojimazaki Lighthouse =

Iojimazaki Lighthouse Iō Sima 伊王島灯台
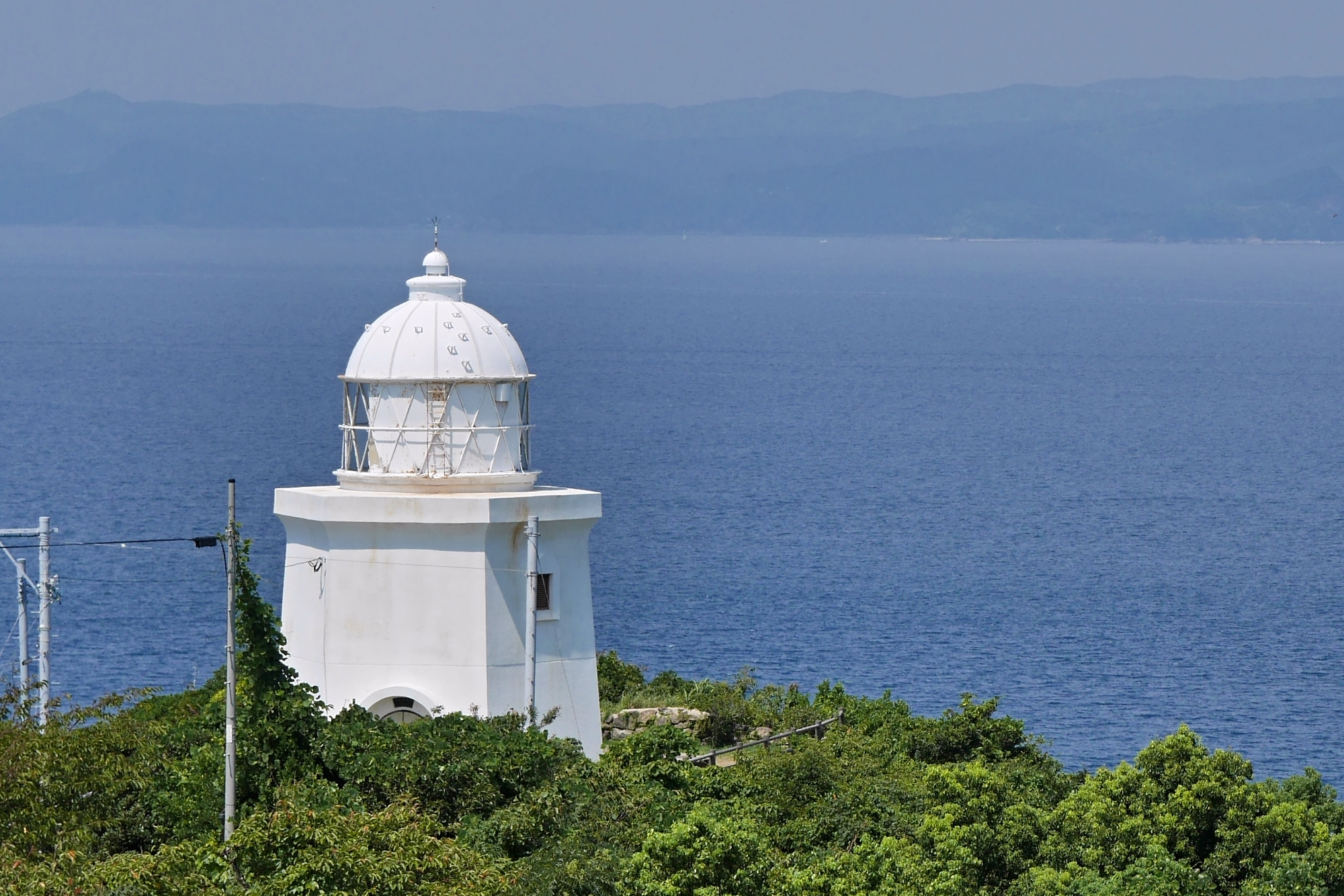
- Location: Iōjima, Nagasaki; Japan
- Coordinates: 32°42′50.7″N 129°45′40.5″E

Tower
- Constructed: September 14, 1871 (first); 1954 (second)
- Construction: concrete tower
- Height: 11.5 metres (38 ft)
- Shape: hexagonal tower with lantern
- Markings: white tower and lantern

Light
- First lit: 2003 (current)
- Focal height: 64.4 metres (211 ft)
- Intensity: 210,000 cd
- Range: 21 nautical miles (39 km; 24 mi)
- Characteristic: Fl (4) W 30s.
- Japan no.: JCG-6330

Iojimazaki Lighthouse (伊王島灯台, iōjima tōdai) is a lighthouse in Iōjima, Nagasaki, Japan.

== History ==
Iojimazaki Lighthouse was one of those designed by Richard Henry Brunton, who was hired by the government of Japan at the start of the Meiji period to help construct lighthouses to make it safe for foreign ships to come to Japan.

== See also ==
- List of lighthouses in Japan
