= Mutsurejima Lighthouse =

Mutsurejima Lighthouse Muture Sima 六連島灯台
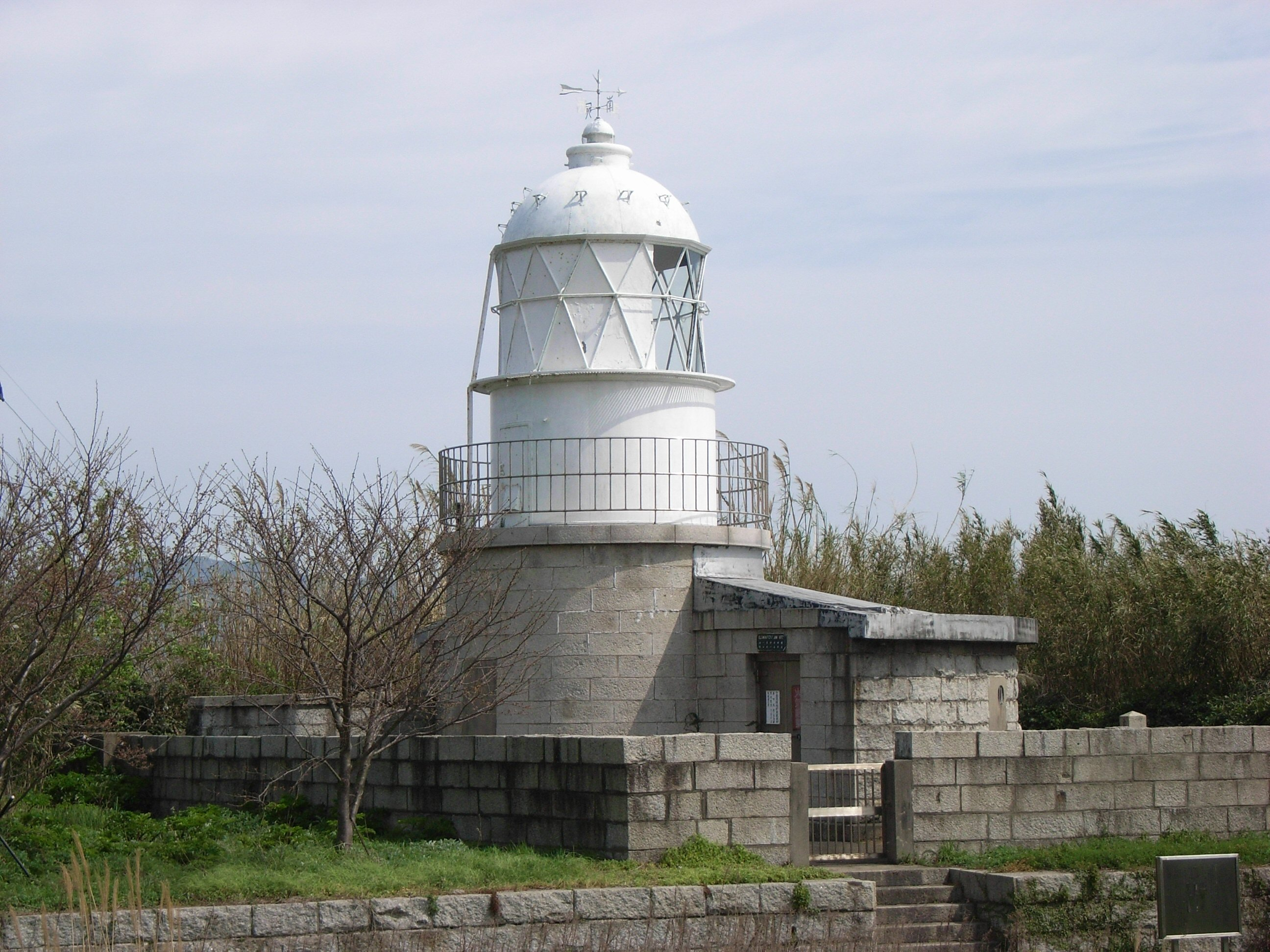
- Mutsurejima Lighthouse
- Location: Mutsurejima; Shimonoseki, Yamaguchi; Japan
- Coordinates: 33°58′41″N 130°52′4.5″E

Tower
- Constructed: 1871
- Construction: granite tower
- Automated: 1969
- Height: 10.6 metres (35 ft)
- Shape: cylindrical tower with balcony and lantern
- Markings: white tower and lantern

Light
- Focal height: 27.9 metres (92 ft)
- Intensity: 310,000 cd
- Range: 15.5 nautical miles (28.7 km; 17.8 mi)
- Characteristic: Fl W 10s.
- Japan no.: JCG-5537

Mutsurejima Lighthouse (六連島灯台, mutsurejima tōdai) is a lighthouse on the island of Mutsurejima, which is administered by Shimonoseki, Yamaguchi, Japan.

== History ==
Work began in late 1870. The lighthouse was first lit in 1872, and was designed by Richard Henry Brunton, who was hired by the government of Japan at the beginning of the Meiji period to help construct lighthouses to make it safe for foreign ships.

== See also ==
- List of lighthouses in Japan
