= Megami (disambiguation) =

Megami is a Japanese anime, bishōjo, and video game magazine which is known for its centerfolds.

Megami may also refer to:

- Megami (drag queen)
- Megami Tensei, a Japanese role-playing video game series
- Oh My Goddess!, a manga and anime series known in Japanese as Aa! Megami-sama (ああっ女神さまっ)

== See also ==
- Ogami (disambiguation)
