= Ogami Lighthouse =

Ogami Lighthouse 尾上島灯台
- Location: Ogami Island, Hirado, Nagasaki Prefecture, Japan
- Coordinates: 33°10′44″N 129°19′56″E

Tower
- Construction: concrete (tower)
- Height: 12 m (39 ft)
- Shape: cylinder
- Markings: white
- Power source: solar power

Light
- Focal height: 76 m (249 ft)
- Range: 12 nmi (22 km; 14 mi)
- Characteristic: Fl W 4s
- Japan no.: JP- 6219

Ogami Lighthouse is a lighthouse located on Ogami Island off the coast of Nagasaki Prefecture in southern Japan. It is notably the first photovoltaically powered lighthouse in the world and was instrumental in demonstrating the viability of photovoltaics in 1966.

== See also ==
- List of lighthouses in Japan
