= Hesaki Lighthouse =

Lighthouse in Japan

Hesaki Lighthouse He Saki 部埼灯台
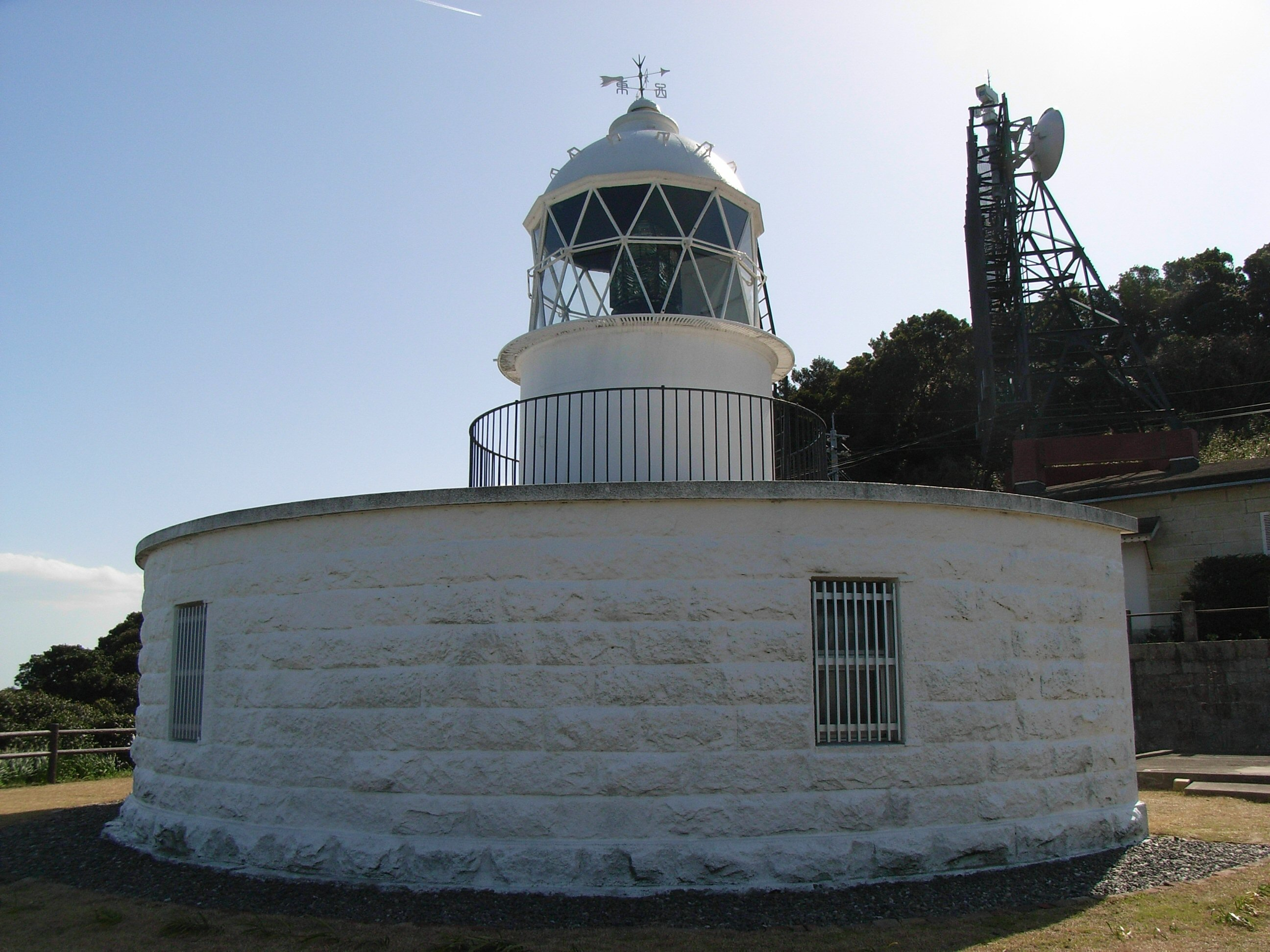
- Hesaki Lighthouse
- Location: Moji-ku, Kitakyūshū; Japan
- Coordinates: 33°57′33.8″N 131°01′22.7″E

Tower
- Constructed: 1871
- Construction: granite tower
- Height: 9.7 metres (32 ft)
- Shape: cylindrical tower with balcony and lantern
- Markings: white tower and lantern

Light
- First lit: 22 January 1871
- Focal height: 39.1 metres (128 ft)
- Lens: Third order Fresnel
- Intensity: flash: 180,000 candela fixed light: 7,000 candela
- Range: 17 nautical miles (31 km; 20 mi)
- Characteristic: F Fl W 15s.
- Japan no.: 5409 [F5312]

Hesaki Lighthouse (部埼灯台, hesaki tōdai) is a lighthouse on the Kiku Peninsula in Moji-ku, Kitakyūshū in Fukuoka Prefecture, Japan. It was constructed in December 1870; the lighthouse was lit on 22 January 1871. It was one of the lighthouses designed by Richard Henry Brunton, who was hired by the government of Japan to help construct lighthouses to make coastal waters safe for foreign ships to approach, after Japan opened up to the West.

== See also ==
- List of lighthouses in Japan
