= Richard Henry Brunton =

British engineer (1841–1901)

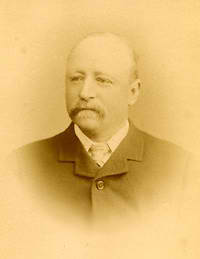
- Born: 26 December 1841; Muchalls, Kincardineshire, Scotland
- Died: 23 April 1901 (aged 59); London, England
- Occupations: Civil engineer, railway engineer, foreign advisor to Japan
- Known for: Lighthouses

Richard Henry Brunton FRGS MICE (26 December 1841 – 24 April 1901) was a British engineer known as the "Father of Japanese lighthouses". Brunton was born in Muchalls, Kincardineshire, Scotland. He was employed by the government of Meiji period Japan as a foreign advisor (o-yatoi gaikokujin), primarily to build lighthouses.

Over a period of seven and a half years he designed and supervised the building of 26 Japanese lighthouses in the Western style, which became known as Brunton's "children". To operate the lighthouses he established a system of lighthouse keepers, based on the one used in Scotland. He also helped found Japan's first school of civil engineering. In 1871, he was received by Emperor Meiji in recognition of his efforts.

== Early life ==
Brunton was born on 26 December 1841 in the Coastguard House (now 11 Marine Terrace) at Muchalls, Fetteresso in The Mearns. His father Richard was an officer in the Coastguard Service who had married Margaret Telfor in January 1841. After training as a railway engineer he joined the Stevenson brothers (David and Thomas Stevenson) who were engaged by the British government to build lighthouses.

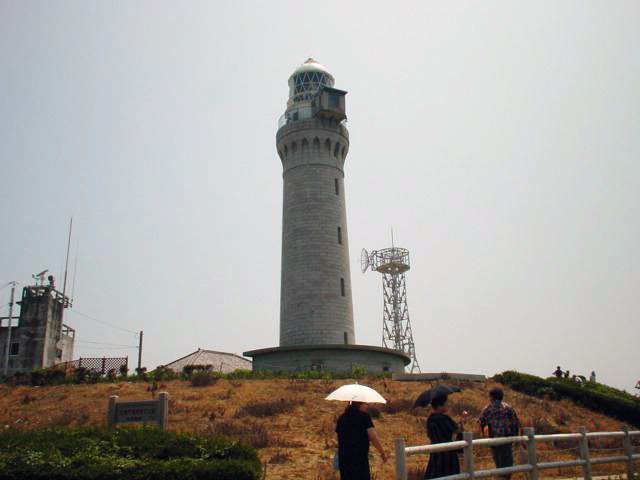
The last of Brunton's 26 "children" - the lighthouse at Tsunoshima island, Hohoku, Shimonoseki, Yamaguchi prefecture

== Career ==
=== Life in Japan ===
Under pressure from British minister Sir Harry Parkes to fulfil its obligations to make the waters and harbors of Japan safe for shipping, the Tokugawa shogunate hired the Edinburgh-based firm of D. and T. Stevenson to chart coastal waters and to build lighthouses where appropriate. The project had already begun under French foreign advisor Léonce Verny, but was not proceeding fast enough for the British.

Brunton was sent from Edinburgh in August 1868 to head the project after being recommended to the Japanese government by the Stevensons, despite the fact that he had no experience in lighthouse building at all. He was accompanied by his wife, sister-in-law and two assistants. The party received word while docked at Aden of the fall of the Tokugawa shogunate and its replacement by the Meiji government, and decided to continue on to Japan, reasoning that the new government was still bound by the international commitments of its predecessor. Over the next seven and a half years he designed and supervised the building of 26 Japanese lighthouses in the Western style, along with two lightvessels. An obituary published in the journal of the Institution of Civil Engineers states "in ten years he had executed 50 lighthouses".

There had been Japanese lighthouses before then, but they were short and squat buildings, such as the old Shirasu lighthouse now in the grounds of Kokura Castle in Kitakyushu.

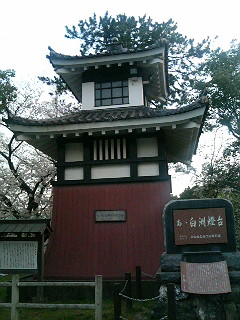
The old pre-Brunton Shirasu lighthouse in the grounds of Kokura Castle

Brunton also established a system of lighthouse keepers, modeled on the Northern Lighthouse Board in Scotland.

Aside from his work on lighthouses around Japan, Brunton also surveyed and drew the first detailed maps of Yokohama, planned its sewage system, street paving and gas lights, established a telegraph system, and designed and built the settlement's first iron bridge. He also helped found Japan's first school of civil engineering. In recognition of his efforts, he was received by Emperor Meiji in an audience in 1871.

Brunton returned to London on a leave of absence in July 1872, and was enlisted to assist the Iwakura Mission during its visit. In September, Brunton took Itō Hirobumi and a group of his assistants to visit 28 factories around London making a variety of manufactured goods, and continued on to Birmingham (notably Chance Brothers the lighthouse engineers), Manchester and Liverpool before rejoining the main group of the Iwakura Mission in Edinburgh in early October.

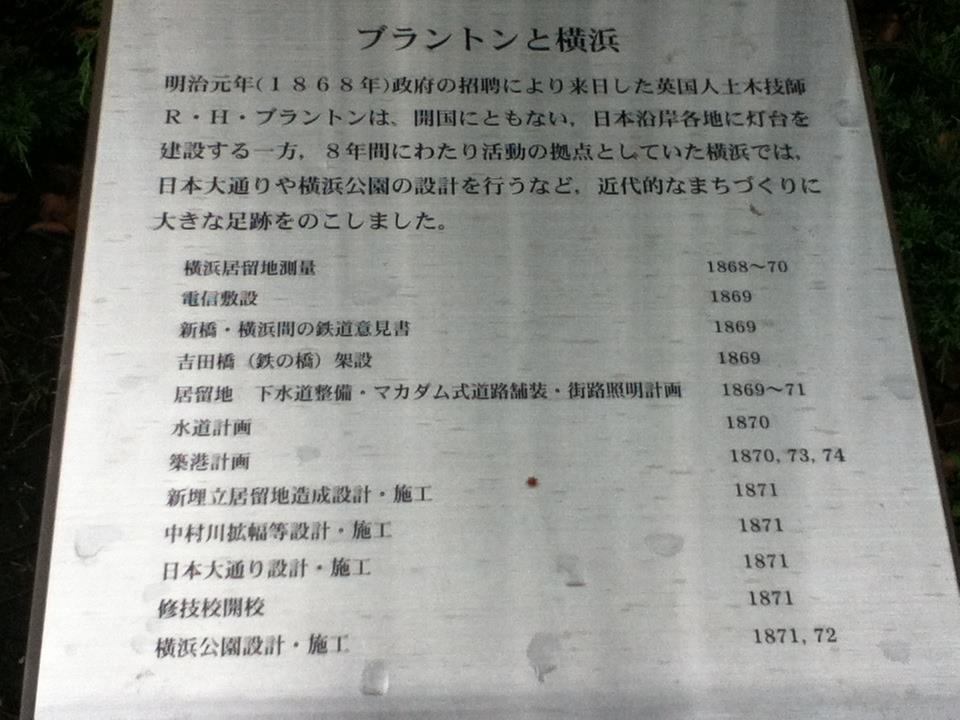
Brunton and Yokohama – the plaque next to his statue in Yokohama records all he did for the city.

=== Return to Britain ===
After disagreeing with Japanese officials he left Japan in March 1876, later receiving a prize for his paper "Japan Lights".

On his return he first set up in Glasgow for Young's Paraffin Oil, before moving to south London in 1881 making architectural plasterwork, where he remained until his death. He is buried in West Norwood Cemetery, where his marble memorial there was restored by the Yokohama Chamber of Commerce in 1991.

== List of Brunton's Japanese Lighthouses ==
The names of the 26 lighthouses (Brunton's "children") constructed by Brunton, in order of north to south, and the names of their present locations after mergers of towns etc.

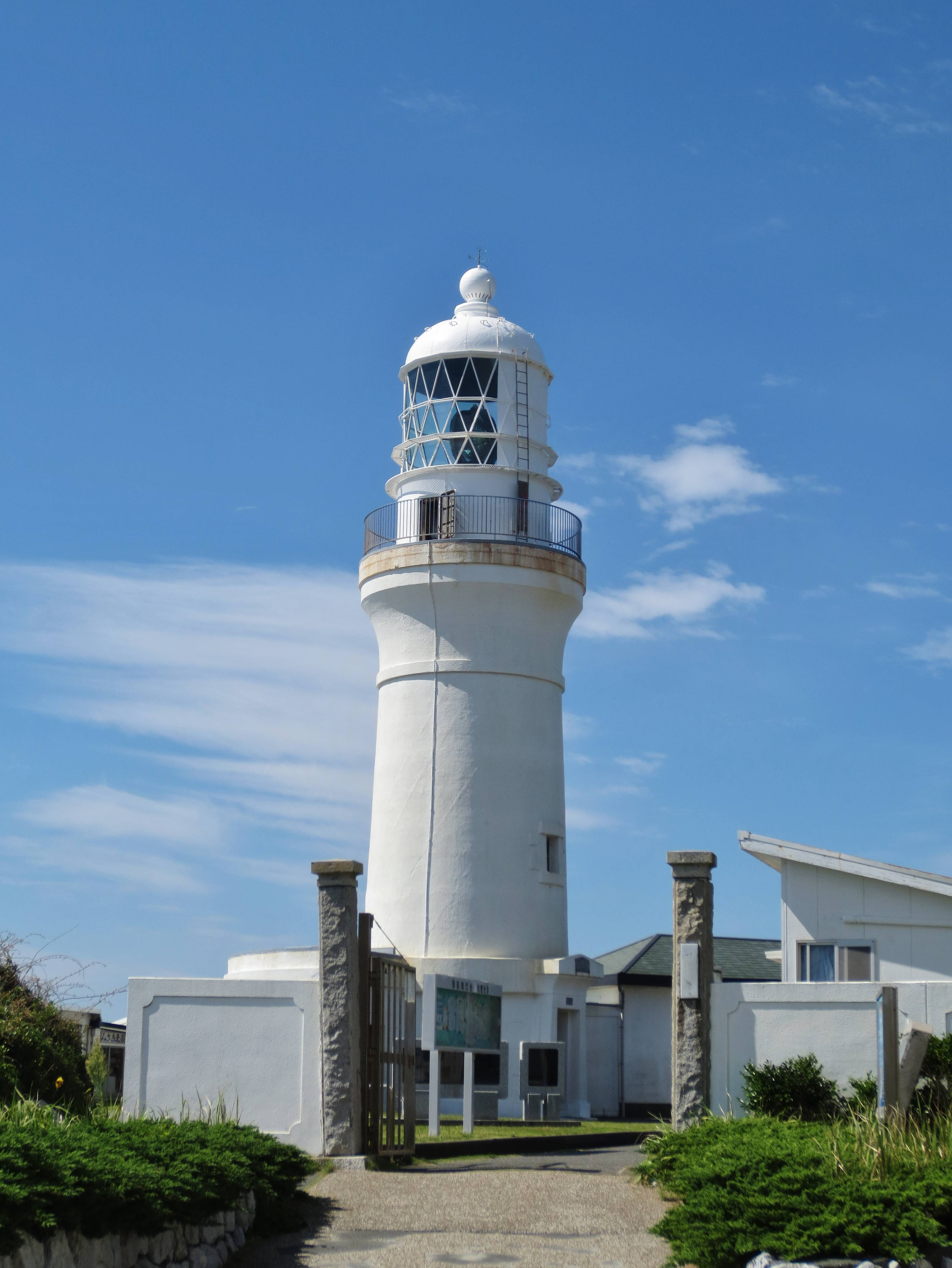
Omaesaki lighthouse

English	Japanese	Location	Illuminated
Nosappumisaki Lighthouse	納沙布岬灯台	Nemuro, Hokkaidō	15 August 1872
Shiriyazaki Lighthouse	尻屋埼灯台	Higashidōri, Aomori	20 October 1876
Kinkasan Lighthouse	金華山灯台	Ishinomaki, Miyagi	1 November 1876
Inubōsaki Lighthouse	犬吠埼燈台	Chōshi, Chiba	15 November 1874
Haneda Lighthouse	羽田灯台	Ōta, Tokyo	15 March 1875 (now extinguished)
Tsurugisaki Lighthouse	剱埼灯台	Miura, Kanagawa	1 March 1871
Mikomotoshima Lighthouse	神子元島灯台	Shimoda, Shizuoka	1 January 1870
Irōzaki Lighthouse	石廊埼灯台	Minamiizu, Shizuoka	5 October 1871
Omaesaki Lighthouse	御前埼灯台	Omaezaki, Shizuoka	1 May 1874
Sugashima Lighthouse	菅島灯台	Toba, Mie	1 July 1873
Anorisaki Lighthouse	安乗埼灯台	Ago, Mie	1 April 1873
Tenpōzan Lighthouse	天保山灯台	Minato-ku, Osaka	1 October 1872 (now extinguished)
Wadamisaki Lighthouse	和田岬灯台	Suma-ku, Kobe	1 October 1872 (now extinguished)
Esaki Lighthouse	江埼燈台	Awaji, Hyōgo	27 April 1871
Kashinosaki Lighthouse	樫野埼灯台	Kushimoto, Wakayama	8 July 1870
Shionomisaki Lighthouse	潮岬灯台	Kushimoto, Wakayama	15 September 1873
Tomogashima Lighthouse	友ヶ島灯台	Wakayama, Wakayama	1 August 1872
Mutsurejima Lighthouse	六連島灯台	Shimonoseki, Yamaguchi	1 January 1872
Tsunoshima Lighthouse	角島灯台	Shimonoseki, Yamaguchi	1 March 1876
Tsurushima Lighthouse	釣島灯台	Matsuyama, Ehime	15 June 1873
Nabeshima Lighthouse	鍋島灯台	Sakaide, Kagawa	15 December 1872 (now extinguished)
Hesaki Lighthouse	部埼灯台	Kitakyūshū, Fukuoka	1 March 1872
Shirasu Lighthouse	白州灯台	Kitakyūshū, Fukuoka	1 September 1873
Eboshijima Lighthouse	烏帽子島灯台	Shima, Fukuoka	1 August 1875
Iojimazaki Lighthouse	伊王島灯台	Nagasaki, Nagasaki	14 September 1871
Satamisaki Lighthouse	佐多岬灯台	Minamiōsumi, Kagoshima	20 November 1871

== Memoir ==
Brunton wrote a memoir of his time in Japan, titled Pioneer Engineering in Japan: A Record of Work in helping to Re-Lay the Foundations of Japanese Empire (1868–1876). However, it was not published until the 1990s, when it was printed by separate publishers under two different names: Building Japan 1868–1876 and Schoolmaster to an Empire: Richard Henry Brunton in Meiji Japan, 1868–1876. (See below.)

The former, containing the text (with some modified spellings) as edited by William Elliot Griffis at the turn of the twentieth century, contains plates with photos and illustrations. The latter however, purports to be based on a manuscript predating the heavy editing of Griffis, while retaining updated versions of Griffis's footnotes.

- Building Japan 1868–1876 by Richard Henry Brunton with an introduction by Hugh Cortazzi, Japan Library Limited, 1991, ISBN 1-873410-05-0
- Schoolmaster to an Empire by R. Henry Brunton, edited by Edward R. Beauchamp, Greenwood Press, 1991, ISBN 0-313-27795-8

In his memoir, Brunton describes in some detail the burial of Frank Toovey Lake, a midshipman who was sailing with him on HMS Manilla when he was making his first survey of locations to erect the lighthouses. The grave is located on the island of Hiroshima in the Seto Inland Sea; a memorial alongside the grave also records the association with Brunton, and in 2018, the Japanese Coast Guard undertook a ceremony at the grave to celebrate both Lake and Brunton. His high regard for the care that the islanders gave to the grave was, as he admitted in his book, in contrast to his general impression of the Japanese.

== See also ==
- Anglo-Japanese relations
- Thomas Blake Glover
- Alexander Cameron Sim
- James MacRitchie—Lighthouse Engineer in Japan c. 1870s
