= Aniva Lighthouse =

Lighthouse on Sakhalin Island, Russia

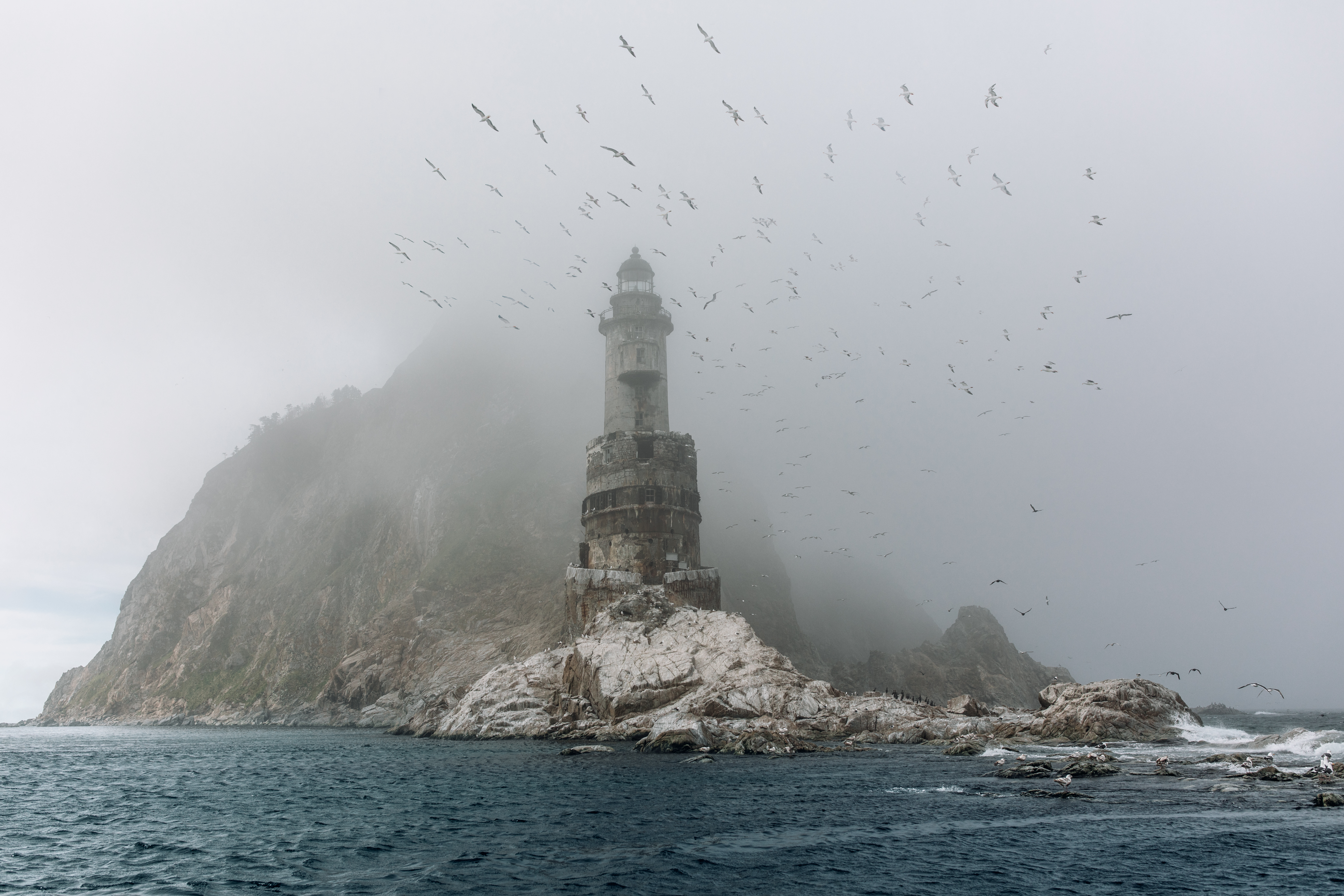
- Location: Cape Aniva, Sakhalin Oblast, Russia
- Coordinates: 46°01′08″N 143°24′51″E

Tower
- Constructed: 1937-1939
- Construction: Concrete
- Automated: 1990
- Height: 31.2 m (102 ft)
- Heritage: candidate heritage site in Russia

Light
- First lit: 1939
- Deactivated: 2006
- Focal height: 40m
- Lens: fresnel
- Range: 15.2nm
- Characteristic: Fl(2) W

The Aniva Lighthouse (Russian: маяк Анива) also known as Nakashiretoko is located on the South East of Sakhalin island, in the North Pacific Ocean. It is located on a difficult to access rock off the tip of Cape Aniva at the entrance of Aniva Bay, on the eastern entrance to the La Pérouse Strait.

== History ==
Construction of a lighthouse at Cape Aniva was first discussed in 1898 following the sinking of a steamship, however these plans were not carried out due to the difficulty in accessing the location.

The lighthouse, was built between 1937 and 1939 when the southern part of the island was controlled by Japan and was a strategic maritime location and was used to guide ships through the perilous waters of the channel. The construction was led by Japanese engineer Shinobu Miura. The lighthouse passed to Soviet control following World War II and remained in operation throughout the Cold War.

In 1990 the lighthouse was automated by installing a Strontium-90 nuclear battery. It was one of 132 Soviet lighthouses automated this way with batteries allowing it to operate for extended periods without human intervention.

In 2006 the battery ceased providing power and due to the improvement of GPS systems it was decided not to install a new one, the site was abandoned; the lighthouse has become derelict.

== Description ==
The lighthouse consists of a circular tower made of concrete, topped by a light room that used to contain a lightsource, the tower is painted in horizontal white and black bands. Attached to the tower is a nine floor building that was designed to house up to 12 lighthouse operators before its operation was automated.

== Popular culture ==
Despite its remote location (a 1.5 hour ride from the closest settlement, followed by a two-hour boat trip) the lighthouse today is a tourist destination.

A lighthouse prominently featured in the videogame Escape from Tarkov is based on Aniva lighthouse.
