= Ōhi Shrine =

Ōhi Shrine (Funabashi Daijingū) 意富比神社 (船橋大神宮)
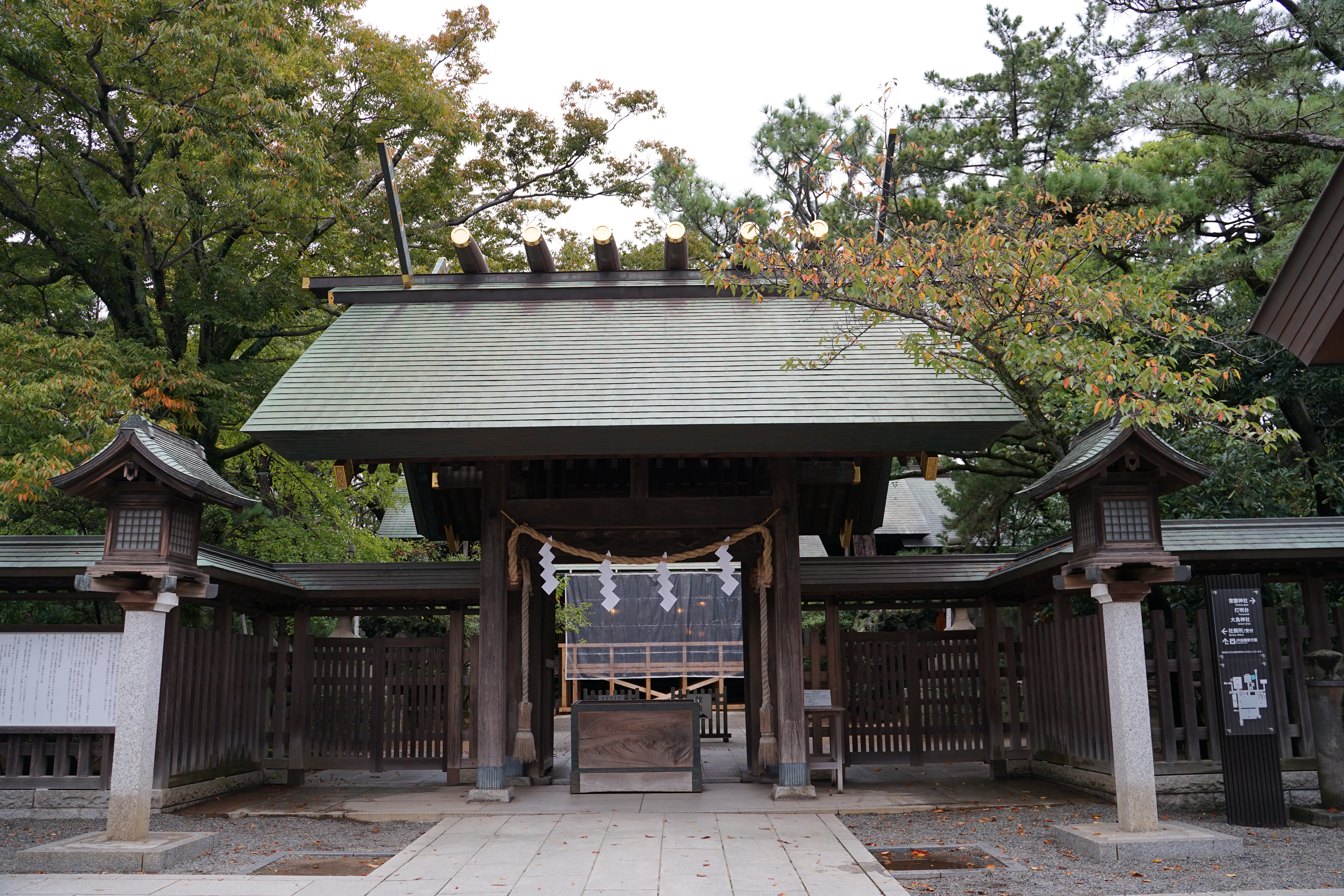
- The prayer area (haisho) before the shrine's haiden

- Location within Japan

Religion
- Affiliation: Shinto
- Deity: Amaterasu
- Festival: 20 October

Location
- Location: 5-2-1, Miyamoto, Funabashi; Chiba 273-0003
- Coordinates: 35°41′46.17″N 139°59′34.58″E

Architecture
- Style: Shinmei-zukuri
- Founder: Yamato Takeru (legendary)
- Established: 40th year of the reign of Emperor Keikō (legendary)

Website
- http://oohijinja.jp/index.html

Ōhi Shrine (意富比神社, Ōhi-jinja; historical orthography: Ohohi-jinja), also known as Funabashi Daijingū (船橋大神宮), is a Shinto shrine dedicated to the sun goddess Amaterasu located in the city of Funabashi in Chiba Prefecture, Japan.

== History ==
Legend claims that Ōhi Shrine was founded by the mythical hero Yamato Takeru during his campaign in eastern Japan in the 40th year of the reign of his father, Emperor Keikō, to pray for the end of a drought that afflicted the area.

The shrine first appears in the historical record as "Ōhi-no-Kami (意富比神) of Shimōsa Province" in the Nihon Sandai Jitsuroku (901), which records its promotion to higher ranks (神階, shinkai) by the imperial court in the mid-9th century, starting from 863 (Jōgan 5) when it was raised from the rank of junior fifth, lower grade (従五位下) to senior fifth, lower grade (正五位下). It was promoted again in 871 (Jōgan 13) to senior fifth rank, upper grade (正五位上), and finally in 874 (Jōgan 16) to junior fourth, lower grade (従四位下). It is listed as a "minor shrine" (小社, shōsha) in the Jinmyōchō ("Register of Deities") section of the Engishiki (927 CE).

While the shrine is currently dedicated to the imperial sun goddess Amaterasu, one theory suggests that it may have originally venerated a local solar deity (the name Ōhi may be interpreted as meaning "great sun") who became conflated with Amaterasu during the medieval era.

Minamoto no Yoriyoshi and his son Yoshiie is said to have rebuilt the shrine somewhere during the Tengi era (1053-1058). In 1138 (Hōen 4), the area in which the shrine was located became a tribute estate or mikuriya (御厨) of the Grand Shrine of Ise known as 'Natsumi Mikuriya' (夏見御厨). The shrine became widely known as 'Funabashi Shinmei' (船橋神明) or 'Funabashi Ise Daijingū' (船橋伊勢大神宮) from the medieval period onwards, suggesting that the branch of Ise Shrine (神明社, shinmeisha) established within the estate was merged with it at some point.

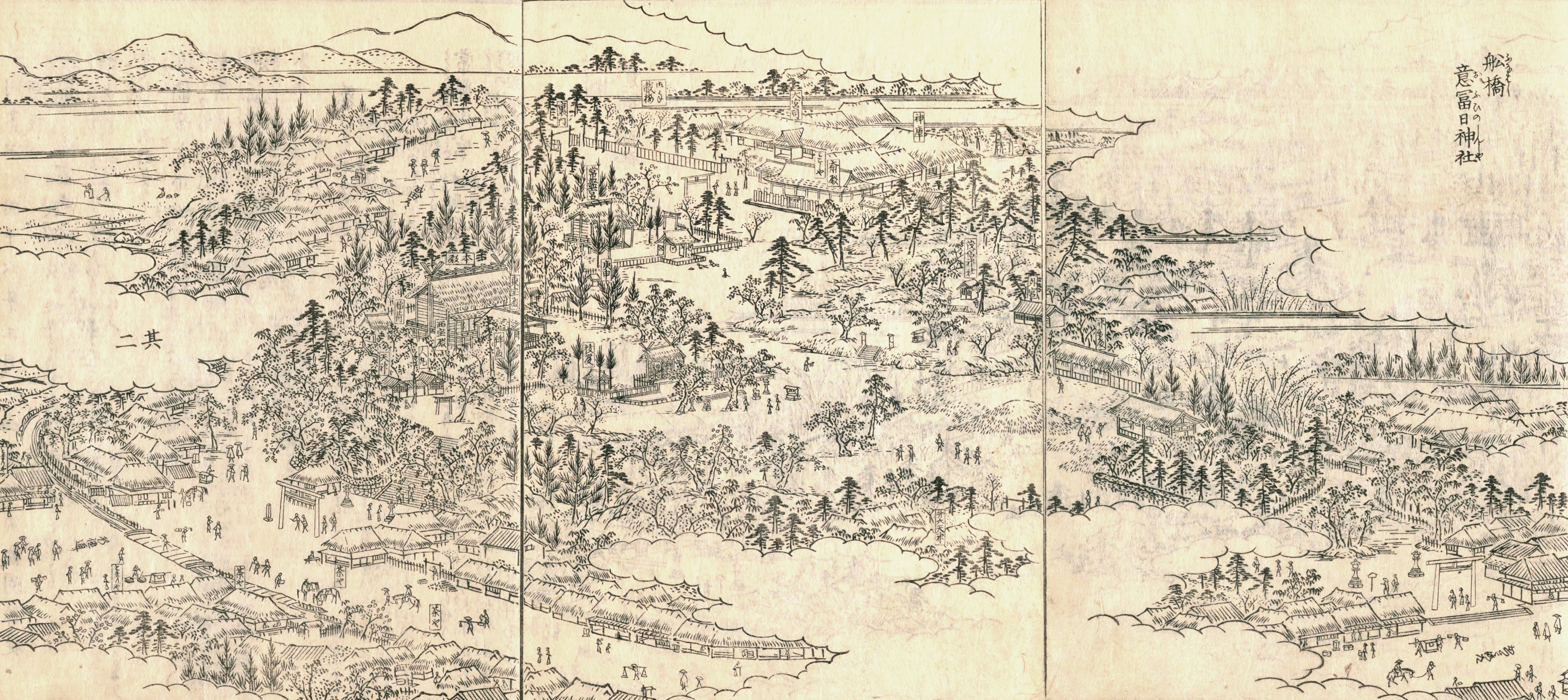
Ōhi Shrine during the Edo period (from the Edo meisho zue)

Nichiren, the founder of Nichiren Buddhism, is said to have performed a ritual fast at the shrine and offered a Gohonzon and a sword to it. At the beginning of the Edo period, Tokugawa Ieyasu donated land worth fifty koku to the shrine. He is also said to have presented a wooden statue of Yamato Takeru to it in 1608 (Keichō 13). The statue was installed by Ieyasu's son and successor, Hidetada, in a newly-constructed auxiliary shrine in 1622 (Genna 8), in which he also enshrined the deified spirit of his late father. Hidetada himself would later be enshrined there by his son Iemitsu, the third shōgun of the Tokugawa dynasty.

The shrine was destroyed during the Battle of Funabashi (part of the Boshin War) in 1868 (Keiō 4). The main sanctuary (honden) was rebuilt in 1873 (Meiji 6), with the haiden and other shrine buildings being rebuilt in 1923 (Taishō 12), 1963 (Shōwa 38), 1975 (Shōwa 50), and 1985 (Shōwa 60), respectively.

== Structures ==
=== Auxiliary shrines ===
The shrine contains a number of auxiliary shrines (setsumatsusha) within its precincts, some of which are:

- Toyoukehime Shrine (豊受姫神社, Toyoukehime-jinja), a.k.a. Gekū (外宮)

An auxiliary shrine dedicated to Toyoukehime (Toyouke-no-Ōkami), the goddess of the Outer Shrine (Gekū) of Ise. The shrine was renovated in 2015 using wood formerly used in the Inner Ise Shrine (Naikū).

- Tokiwa Shrine (常盤神社)

Dedicated to Yamato Takeru, Tokugawa Ieyasu, and Tokugawa Hidetada. Originally established by Hidetada in 1622 (Genna 8) to enshrine Yamato Takeru and his father Ieyasu, he was also eventually enshrined alongside them as a deity by his son and successor Iemitsu. The current shrine building, replacing the previous one constructed during the Meiji period, was built in 2015 to commemorate the upcoming 400th anniversary of Ieyasu's death the following year.

- Yakumo Shrine (八雲神社, Yakumo-jinja)

This shrine, located beside the Gekū, enshrines Susanoo, Kushinadahime, and Ōnamuchi (Ōkuninushi).

- Ōtori Shrine (大鳥神社, Ōtori-jinja)

Dedicated to Yamato Takeru.

- Ame-no-Mihashira Shrine (天之御柱宮, Ame-no-Mihashira-no-miya)

Dedicated to the eirei (英霊, "heroic spirits") or war dead who lost their lives in service of Japan.

- Yatsurugi Shrine (八劔神社, Yatsurugi-jinja) and Yasaka Shrine (八坂神社, Yasaka-jinja)

The two shrines, both dedicated to Susanoo, are in the form of two mikoshi housed within a single building.

- Kotohira Shrine (金刀比羅社, Kotohira-sha)
- Funatama Shrine (船玉神社)

This boat-shaped shrine is currently dedicated to Ame-no-Torifune and the Sumiyoshi deities, though the shrine's name suggests it may have originally venerated the funadama ("boat spirit"), a folk deity worshiped by fishermen and sailors as a protector of ships.

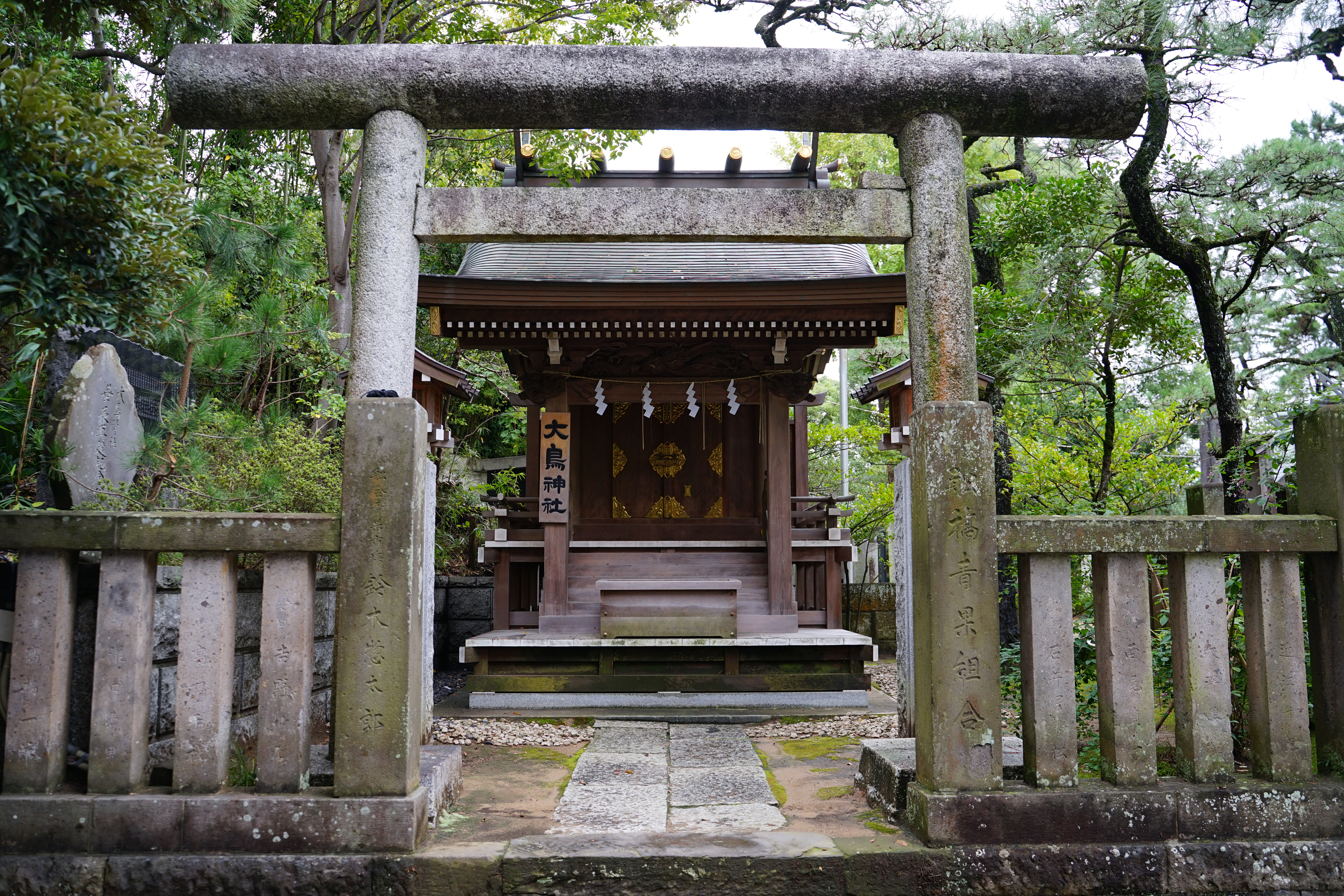
Ōtori Shrine (大鳥神社)

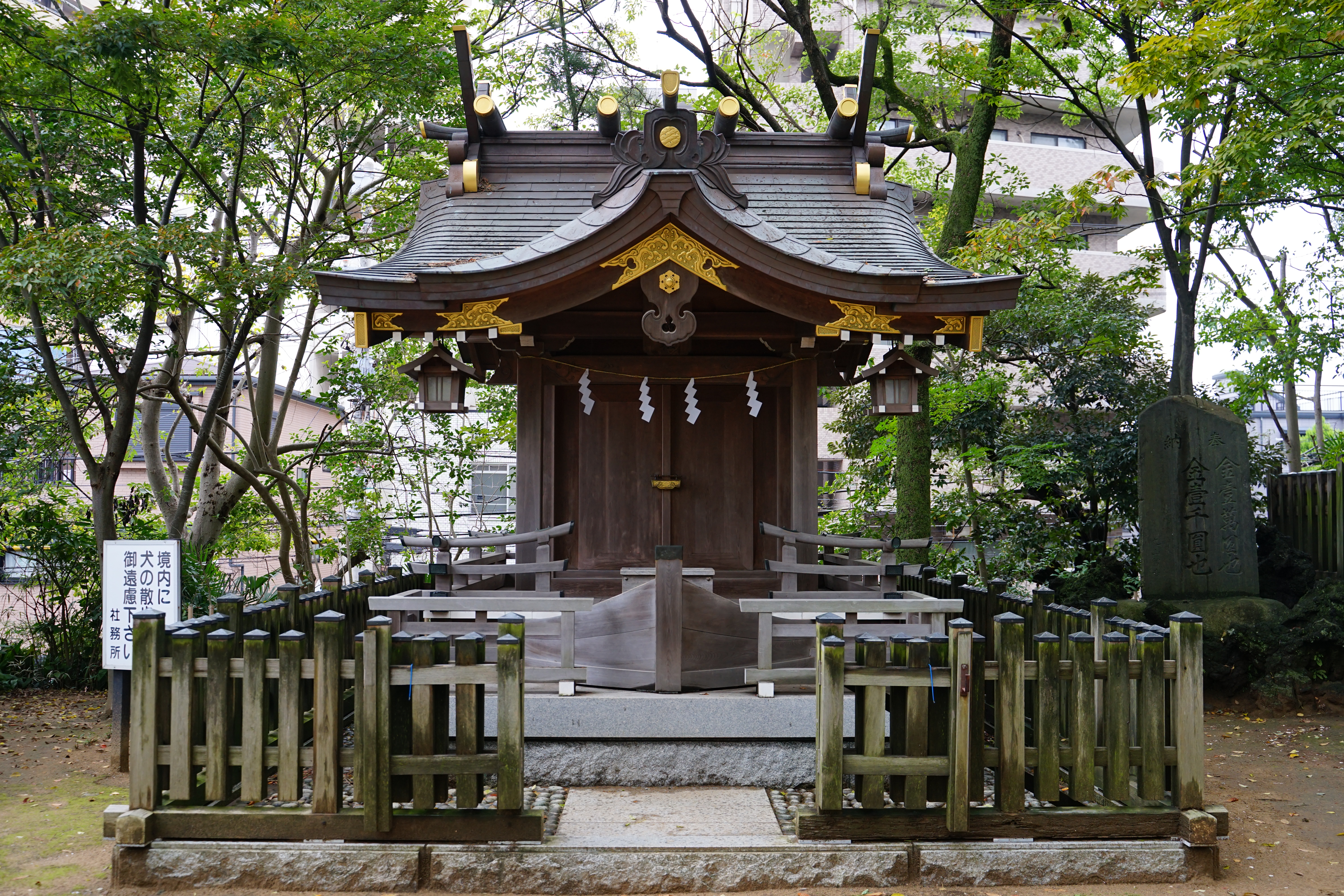
Funatama Shrine (船玉神社)

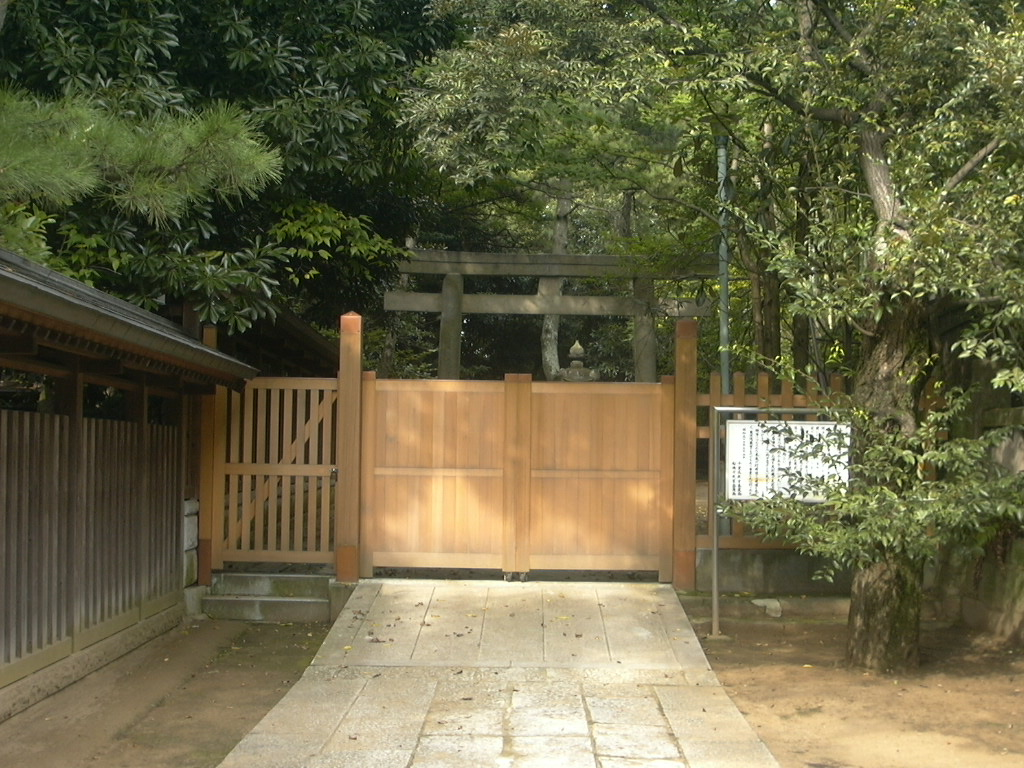
The exterior of Tokiwa Shrine before its 2015 renovation

== See also ==
- Amaterasu
- Yamato Takeru
- Ise Grand Shrine
- Tōshō-gū
- Shimōsa Province
