= Nojimazaki Lighthouse =

Nojimazaki Lighthouse Nozima Saki 野島埼灯台
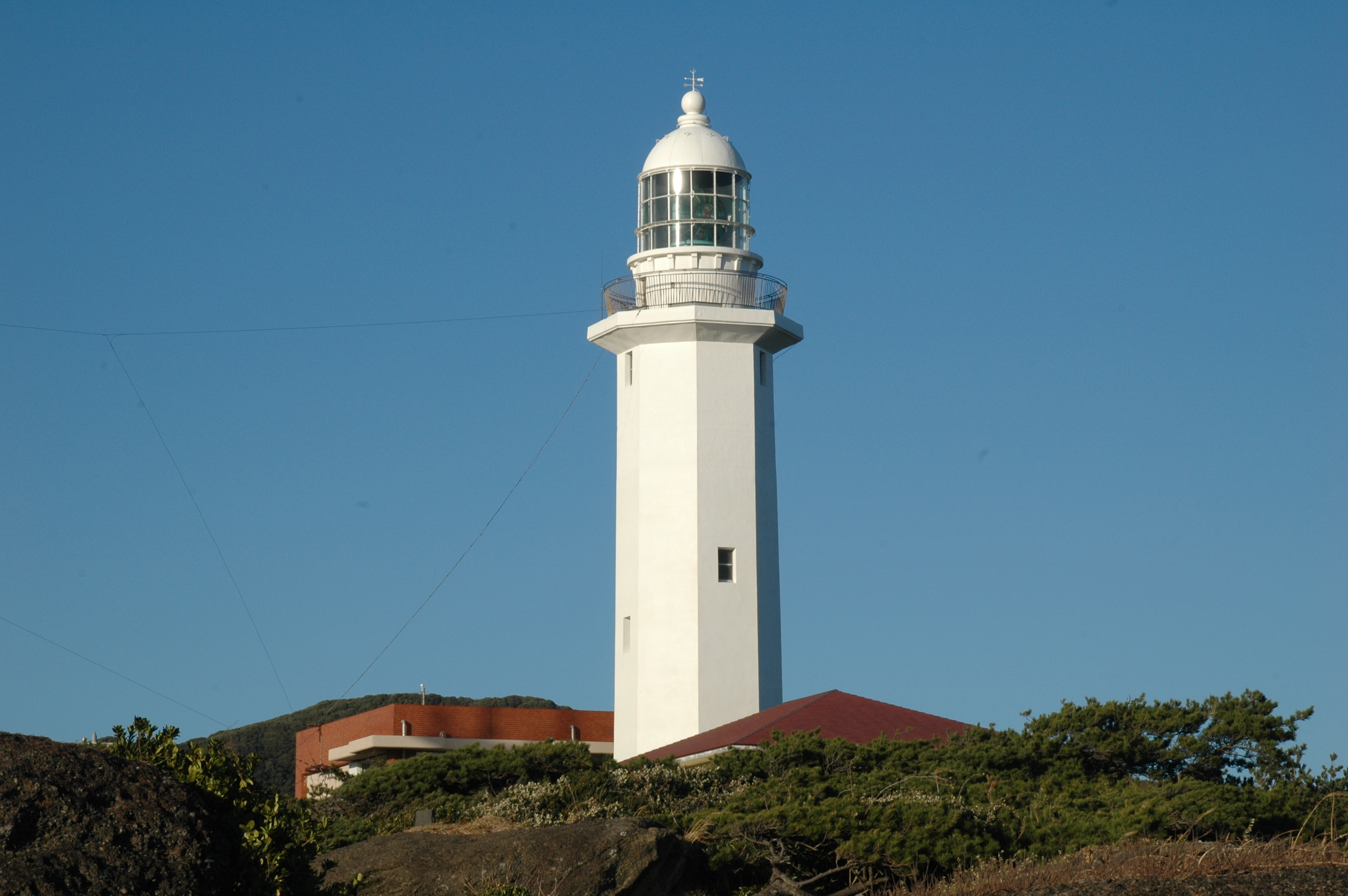
- Nojimasaki Lighthouse
- Location: Minamibōsō; Chiba Prefecture; Japan
- Coordinates: 34°54′06.4″N 139°53′17.8″E

Tower
- Constructed: 1869 (first)
- Foundation: brick and concrete
- Construction: concrete tower
- Height: 29 metres (95 ft)
- Shape: octagonal tower with balcony and lantern
- Markings: white tower and lantern
- Heritage: Registered Tangible Cultural Property of Japan

Light
- First lit: 1925
- Focal height: 38 metres (125 ft)
- Lens: Second Order Fresnel
- Intensity: 1,200,000 candela
- Range: 32 kilometres (17 nmi)
- Characteristic: Fl W R 20s
- Japan no.: JCG-1910

Nojimazaki Lighthouse (野島埼灯台, Nojimazaki tōdai) is a lighthouse located at the southern tip of the Bōsō Peninsula, in the city of Minamibōsō, Chiba Prefecture Japan.

== History ==
The Nojimazaki Lighthouse was one of eight lighthouses to be built in Meiji period Japan under the provisions of the Anglo-Japanese Treaty of Amity and Commerce of 1858, signed by the Bakumatsu period Tokugawa Shogunate. The lighthouse was designed and constructed by French engineer Léonce Verny, and is noteworthy in that it is the second lighthouse to be completed in Japan, after the Kannonzaki Lighthouse on the opposing entrance to Tokyo Bay. As completed, the whitewashed octagonal brick structure stood 30 metres (98 ft) high, and had a first-order Fresnel lens, with a kerosene light source. The lighthouse was first lit on January 19, 1869.

During the 1923 Great Kantō earthquake, the top eight meters of the structure collapsed. It was rebuilt in concrete, and recommissioned on August 15, 1925. The structure was again damaged in 1945 by bombardment by the United States Navy. It was repaired after the war with a second-order Fresnel lens, and was subsequently electrified.

== Current status ==
The Nojimazaki Lighthouse is currently open to the public, who may visit a small museum at its base, and climb to the top for a panoramic view over the Pacific Ocean. It is registered with the International Association of Lighthouse Authorities as one of the “One Hundred Most Important Lighthouses in the World” and by the Japanese government as a Historic Monument.

== Gallery ==
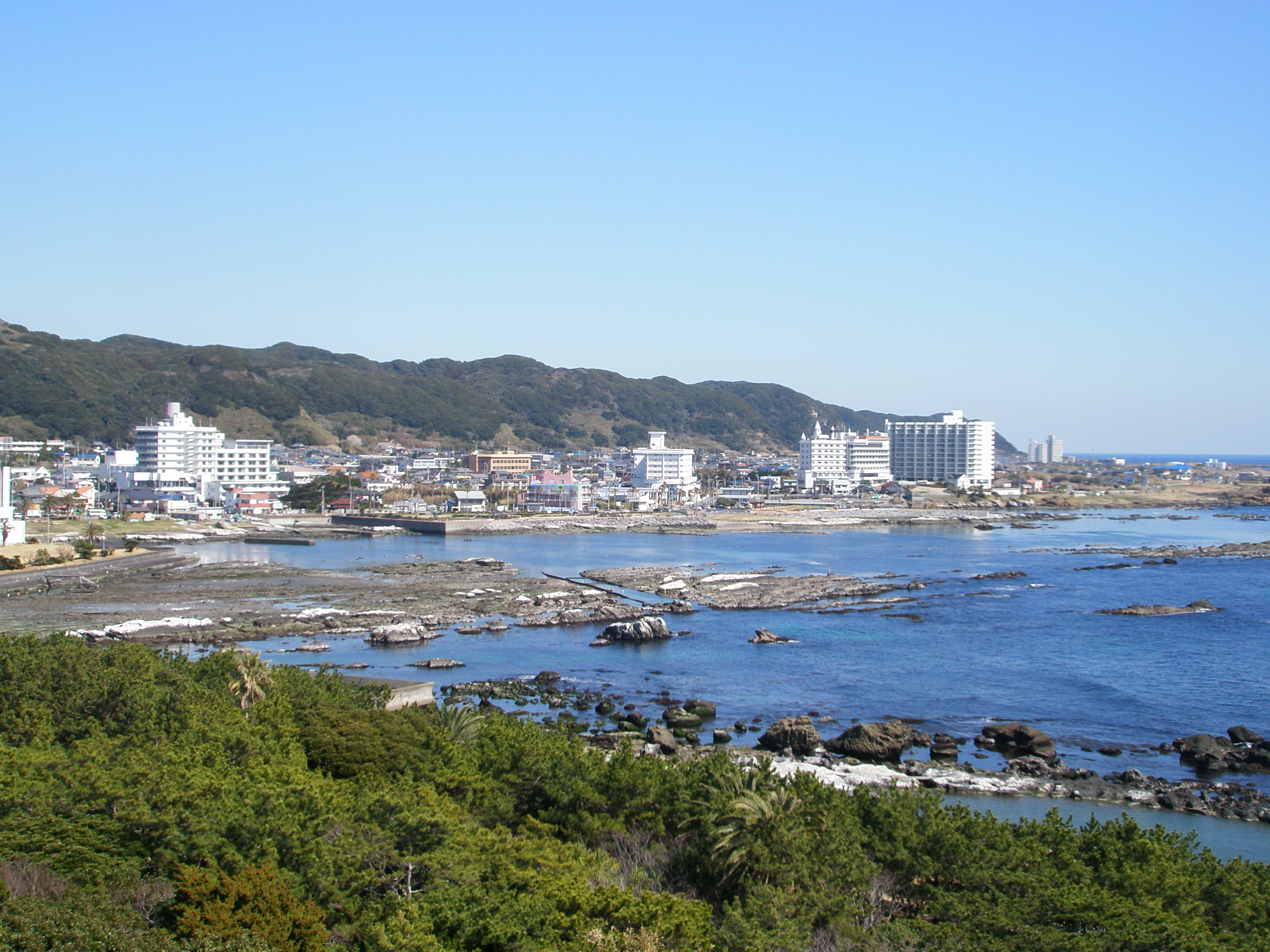
View of Nojimazaki-Lighthouse

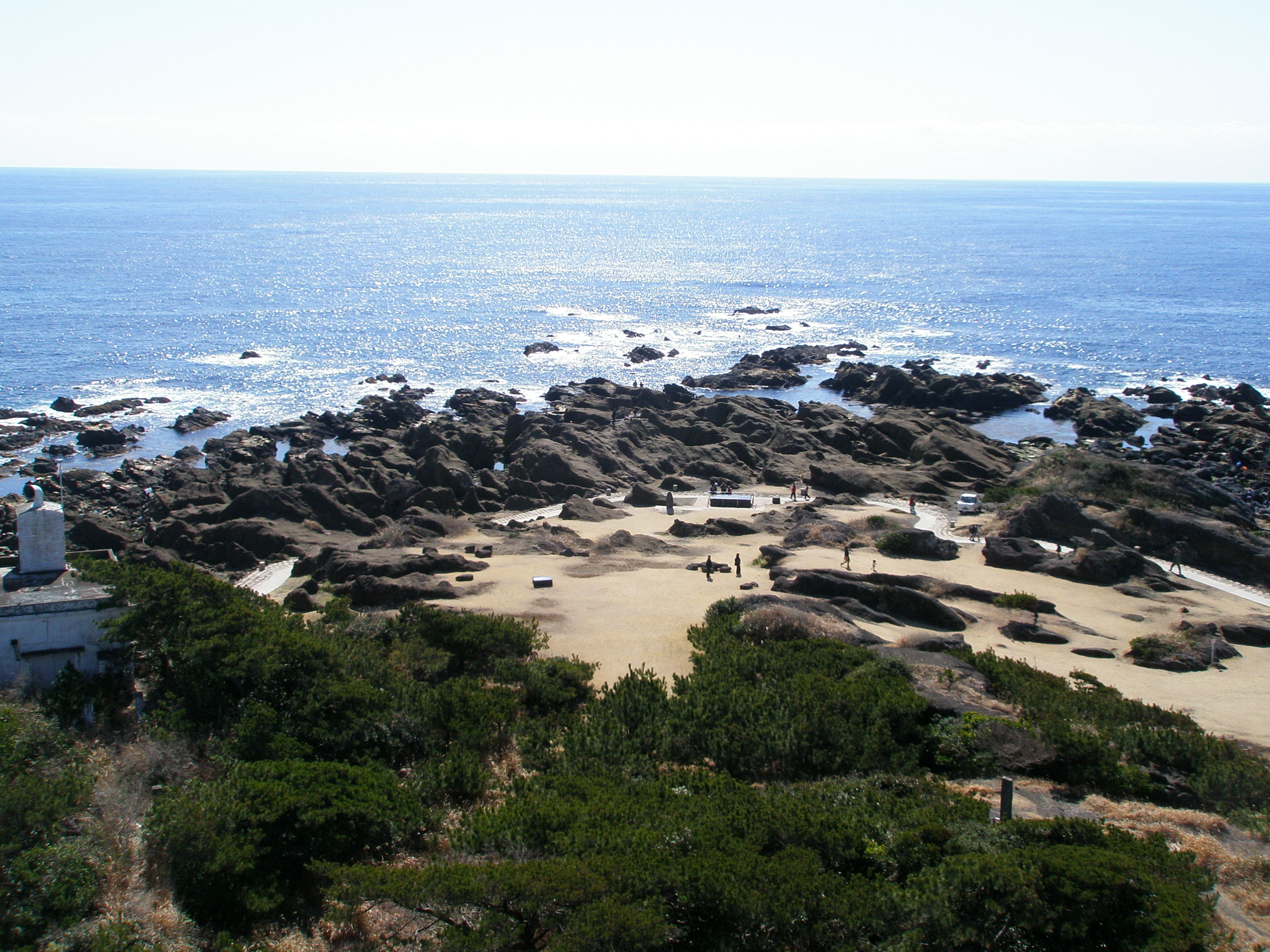

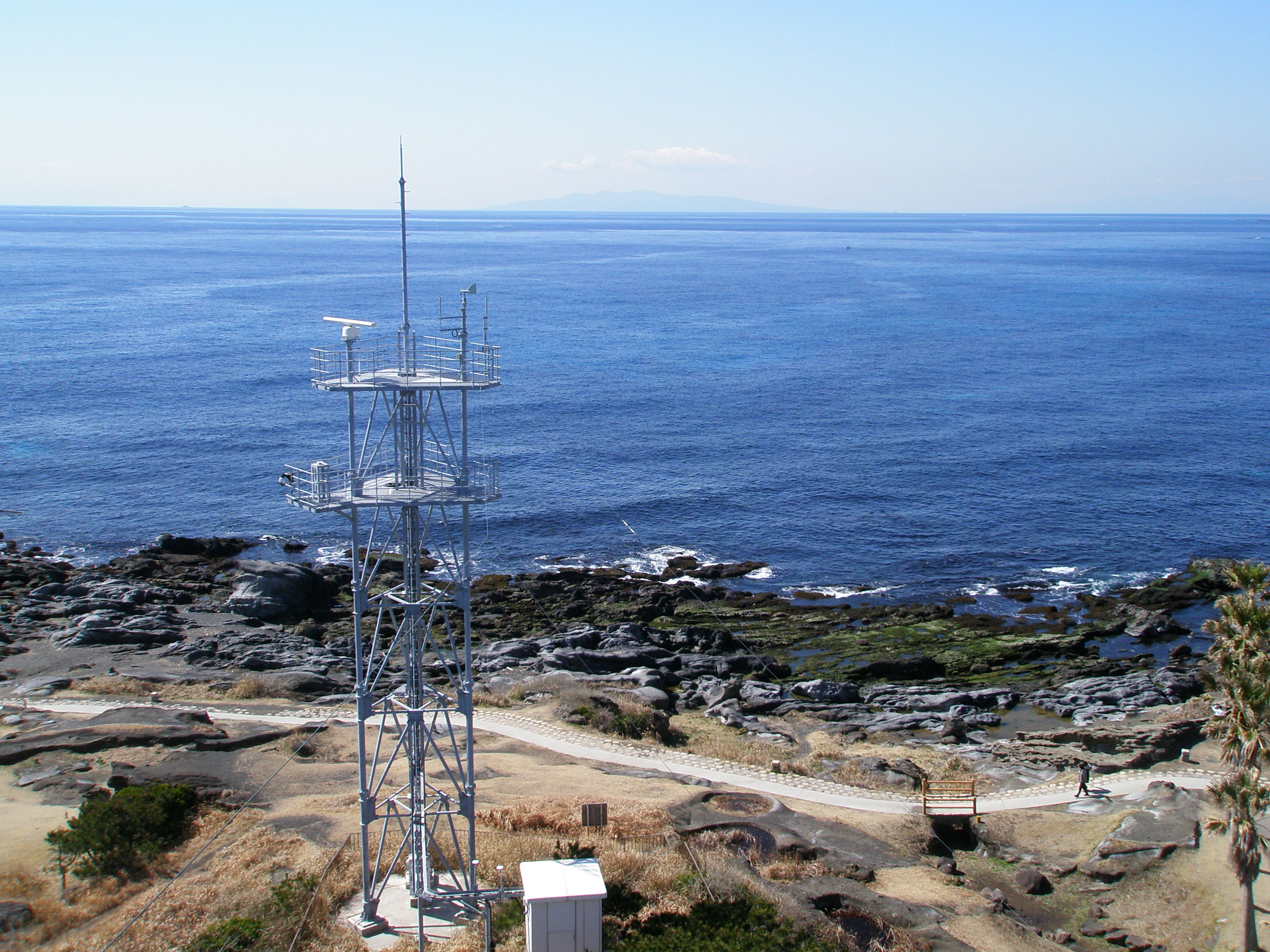

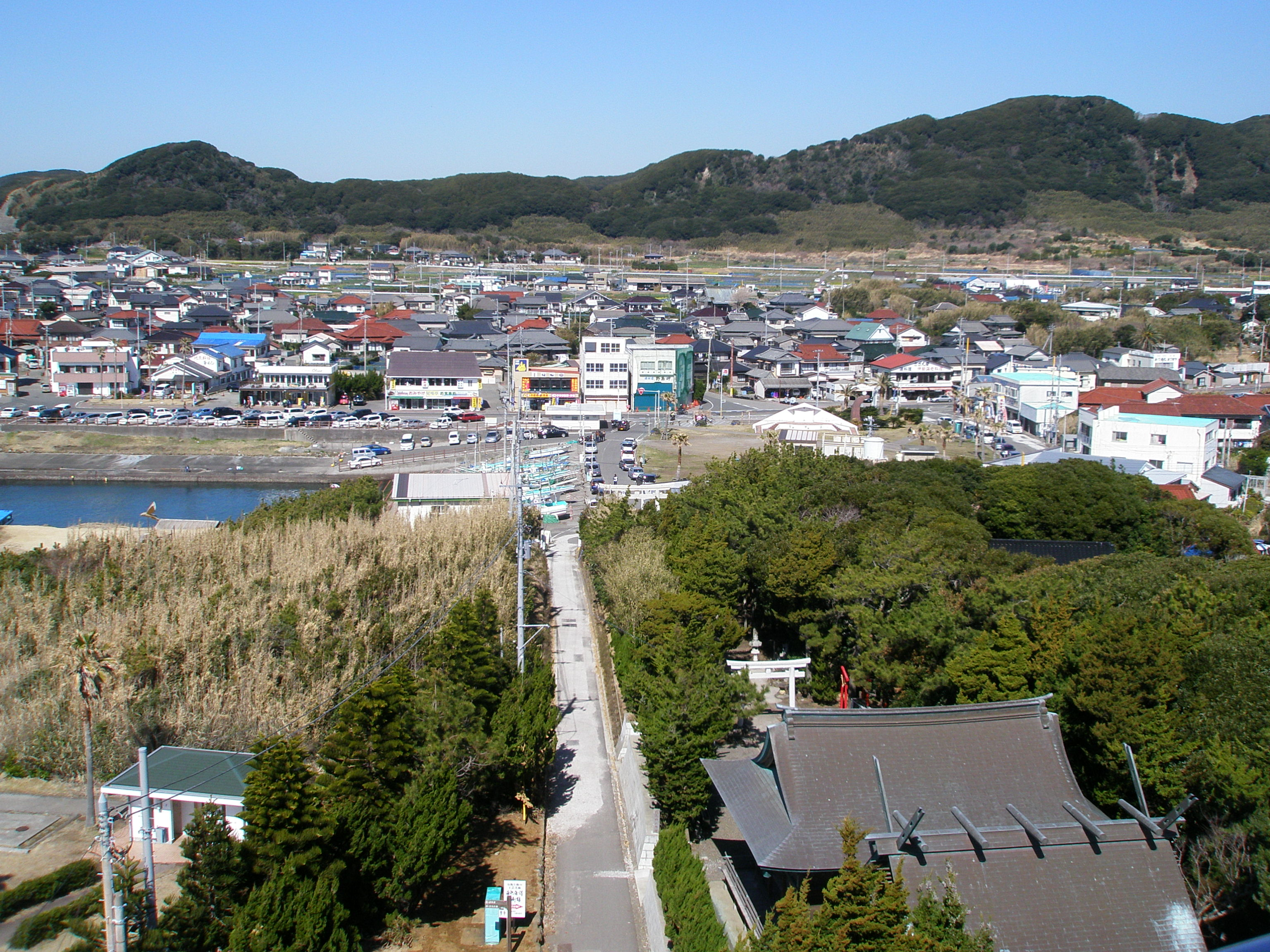

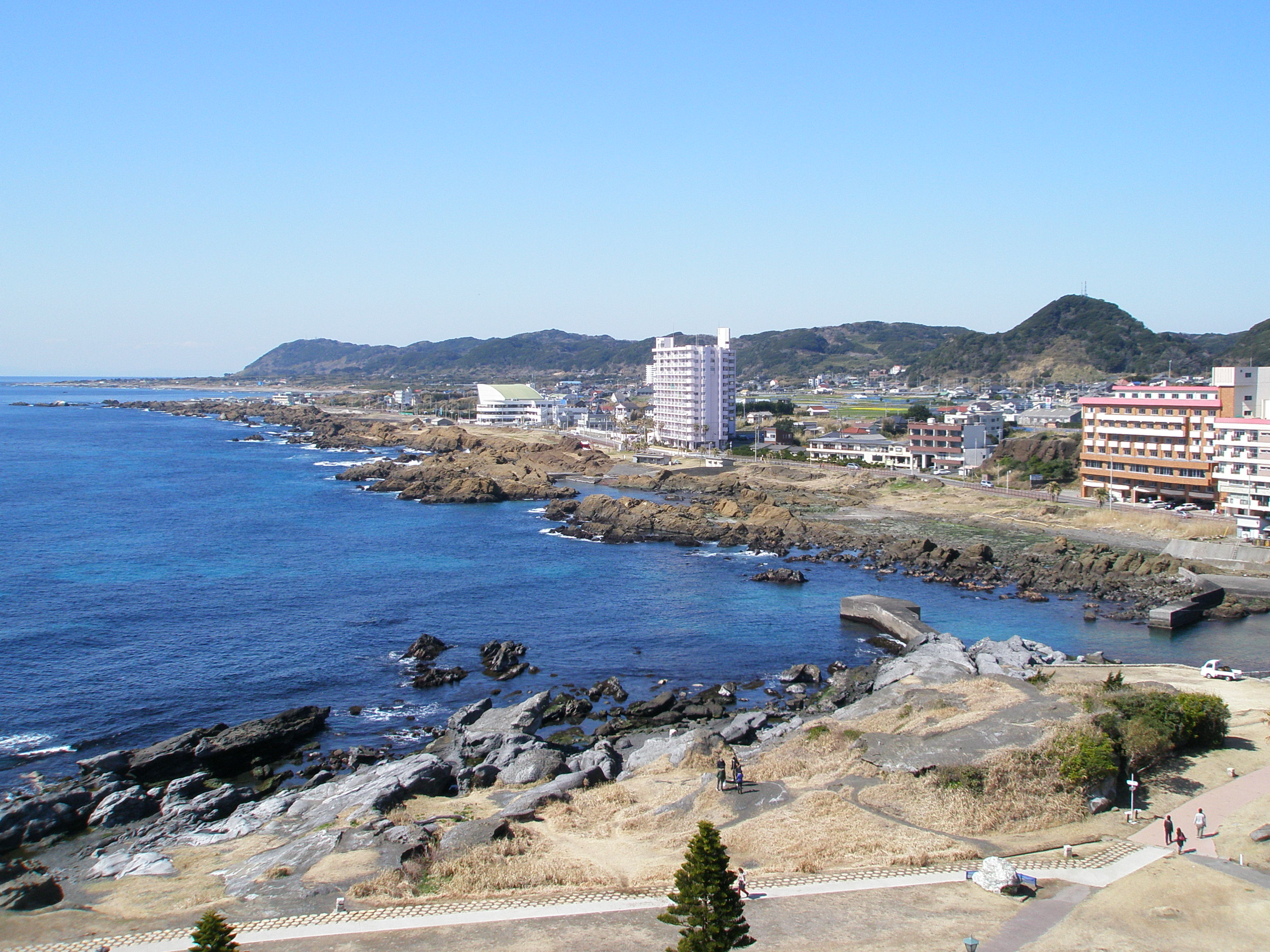

== See also ==
- List of lighthouses in Japan
