= Tsurugisaki Lighthouse =

Tsurigisaki Lighthouse Turugi Saki 剱埼灯台
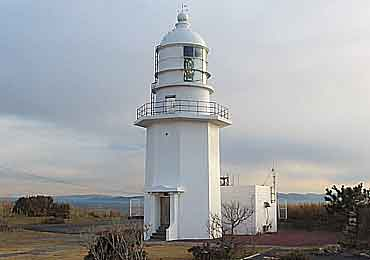
- Location: Miura, Japan
- Coordinates: 35°08′25″N 139°40′38″E

Tower
- Constructed: 1871 (first)
- Construction: concrete (foundation), concrete (tower)
- Height: 16.9 m (55 ft)
- Shape: octagonal tower with balcony and lantern

Light
- First lit: 1925 (current)
- Focal height: 41 m (135 ft)
- Lens: second order Fresnel lens
- Intensity: 520,000 candela
- Range: 18 nmi (33 km; 21 mi)
- Characteristic: Al Fl(2+1) WG 30s
- Japan no.: JCG-2018

Tsurugisaki Lighthouse (剱埼灯台, Tsurugisaki tōdai) is a lighthouse located on Cape Tsurugi on the southeastern extremity of the city of Miura, Kanagawa Prefecture, Japan on the southernmost and eastern tip of Miura Peninsula. (On the southernmost western tip of Miura Peninsula stands the Jōgashima Lighthouse.)

The Tsurugisaki Lighthouse was one of eight lighthouses to be built in Meiji period Japan under the provisions of the Anglo-Japanese Treaty of Amity and Commerce of 1858, signed by the Bakumatsu period Tokugawa Shogunate. The lighthouse was designed and constructed by British engineer Richard Henry Brunton. Brunton constructed another 25 lighthouses from far northern Hokkaidō to southern Kyūshū during his career in Japan.

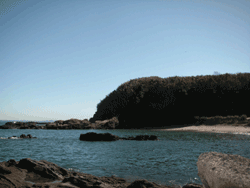
Cape Tsurugi.

Work began in March 1870. The Tsurugisaki Lighthouse was completed on March 1, 1871, and was designed to protect shipping entering Tokyo Bay via the Uraga Channel, with its light visible as far as the Bōsō Peninsula on the eastern shore of the bay. The original structure was destroyed during the Great Kantō earthquake on September 1, 1923, and was replaced with the current reinforced-concrete structure on July 4, 1925. The lighthouse has been unmanned since 1991.

It is currently maintained by the Japan Coast Guard.

== See also ==
- List of lighthouses in Japan
