= Miura Peninsula =

Prominence in Kanagawa Prefecture, separating Tokyo Bay from Sagami Bay

Coordinates: 35°14′N 139°40′E

Location of Miura Peninsula

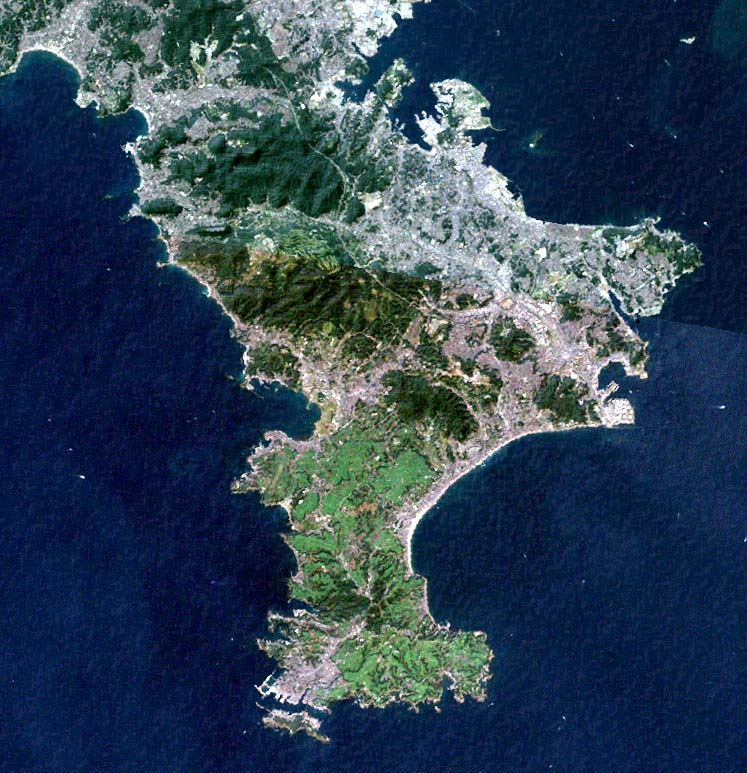
Landsat image with high-resolution data from Space Shuttle.

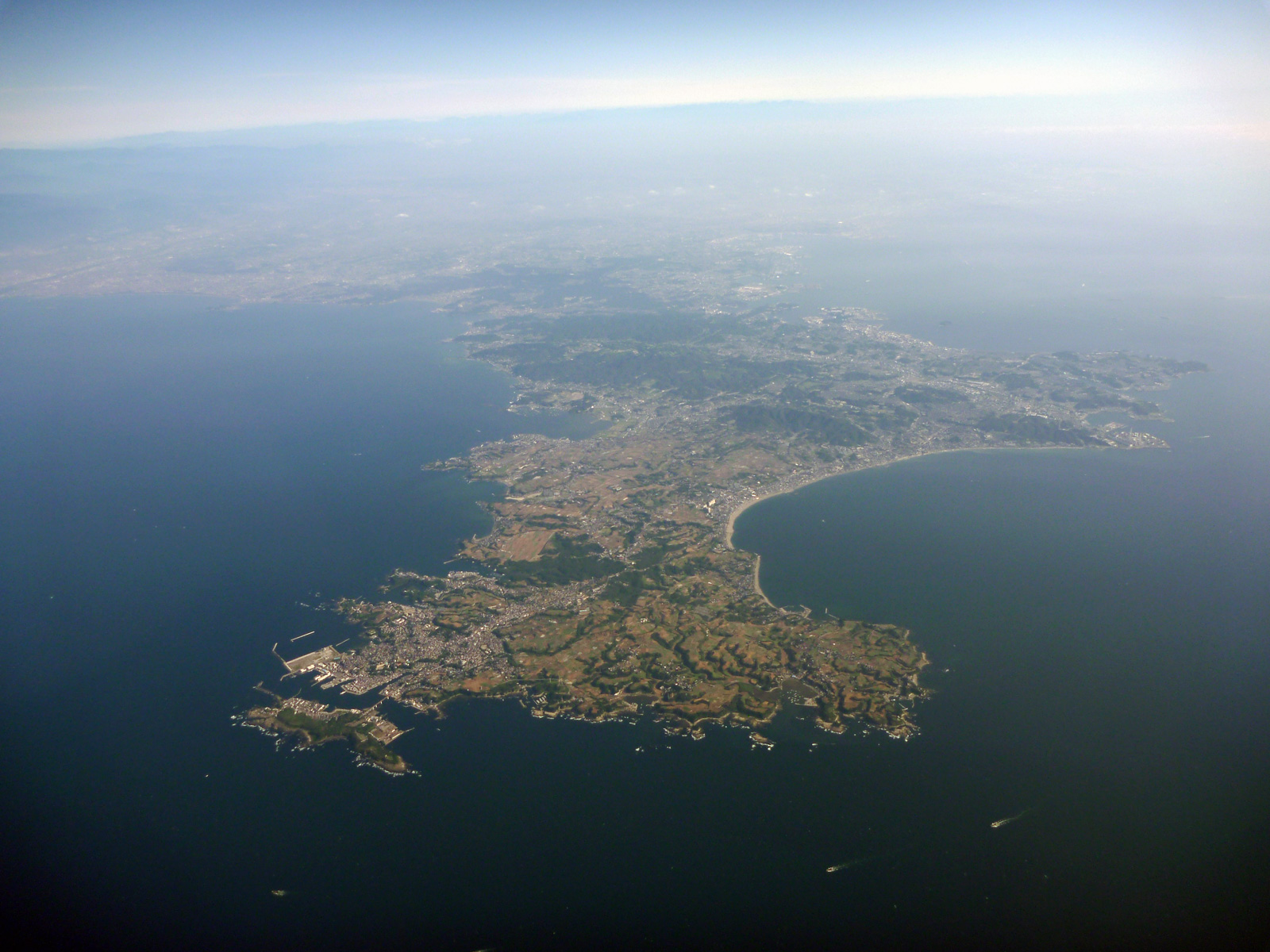
Aerial photo of Miura Peninsula

The Miura Peninsula (三浦半島, Miura-hantō) is a peninsula located in Kanagawa, Japan. It lies south of Yokohama and Tokyo and divides Tokyo Bay, to the east, from Sagami Bay, to the west. Cities and towns on the Miura Peninsula include Yokosuka, Miura, Hayama, Zushi, and Kamakura. The northern limit of the peninsula runs from Koshigoe, Kamakura in the west, across to Mt. Enkai, in the southern wards of Yokohama in the east, overlooking Tokyo Bay.

== Overview ==
The peninsula is a bedroom community for those who work in Tokyo and a popular tourist destination for people from Tokyo. It is also an important area for Japan's self-defense, with the eastern side hosting the National Defense Academy of Japan and the Yokosuka Naval Base, serving both the Japanese Maritime Self Defence Force and the United States Seventh Fleet.

A significant portion of Tokyo's electricity is generated at Tokyo Electric's power station at Kurihama, and important R&D activity on next-generation mobile phones is done at Yokosuka Research Park.

== Three lighthouses ==
There are three important lighthouses on Miura Peninsula. Kannonzaki Lighthouse stands at the easternmost tip of the peninsula, facing Cape Futtsu across the bay. At Cape Tsurugi on the eastern side of the southernmost tip of the peninsula is the Tsurugisaki Lighthouse, one of Japan's oldest western style lighthouses, first illuminated in 1871. On the island of Jōgashima, off the southernmost and western tip of the peninsula, stands the Jōgashima Lighthouse.
