= Meiji-mura =

Open-air museum in Inuyama, Aichi, Japan

Coordinates: 35°20′26″N 136°59′19″E

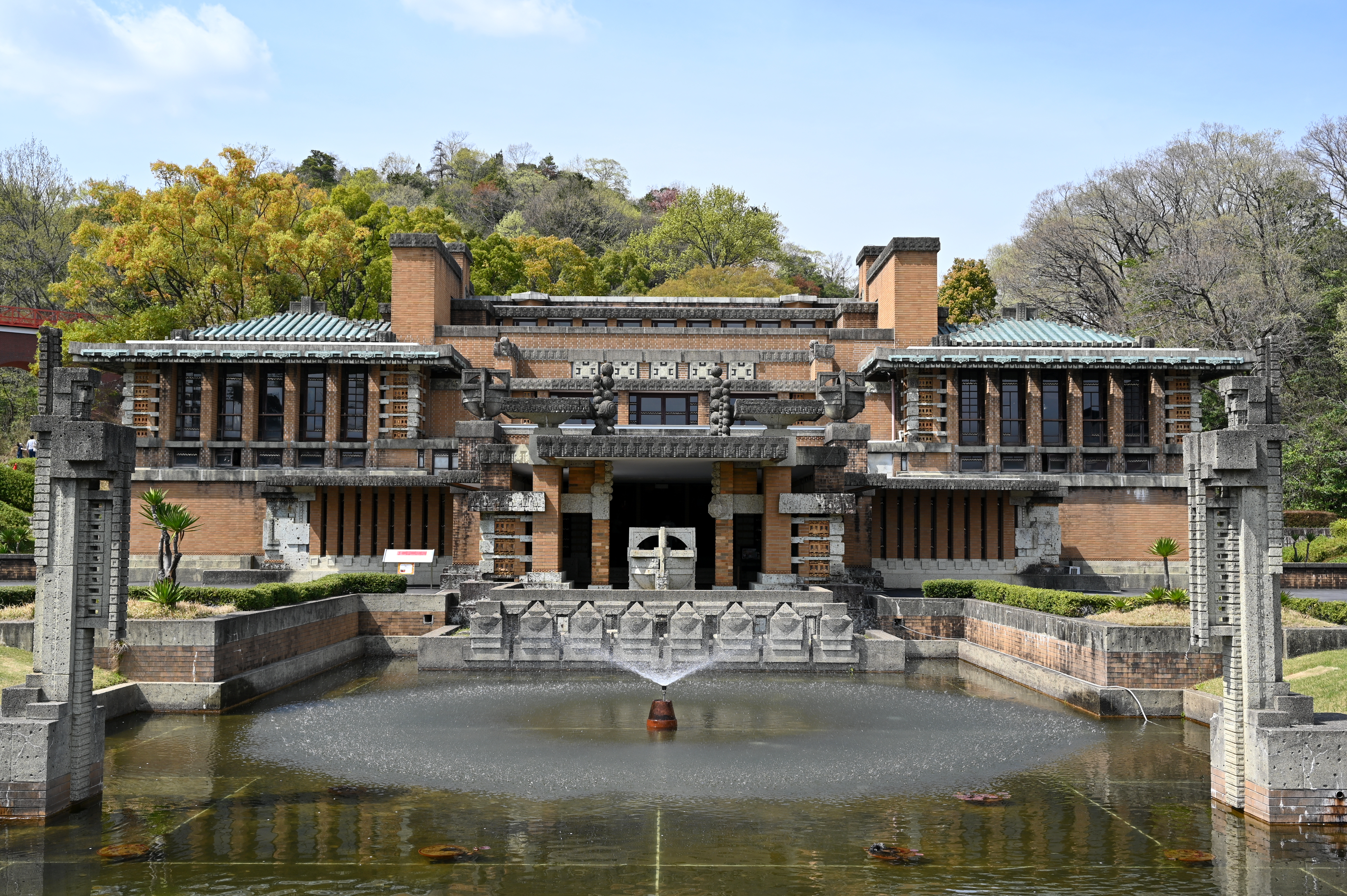
The main lobby of the Imperial Hotel, preserved in Meiji-mura

Meiji-mura (博物館明治村, Hakubutsukan Meiji-mura; "Meiji Village Museum") is an open-air architectural museum and theme park in Inuyama, near Nagoya in Aichi prefecture, Japan. It was opened on March 18, 1965. The museum preserves historic buildings from Japan's Meiji (1867–1912), Taishō (1912–1926), and early Shōwa (1926–1945) periods.

Over 60 historical buildings have been moved and reconstructed onto 1 square kilometre (250 acres) of rolling hills alongside Lake Iruka. The most noteworthy building there is the reconstructed main entrance and lobby of Frank Lloyd Wright's landmark Imperial Hotel, which originally stood in Tokyo from 1923 to 1967, when the main structure was demolished to make way for a new, larger version of the hotel.

== History ==
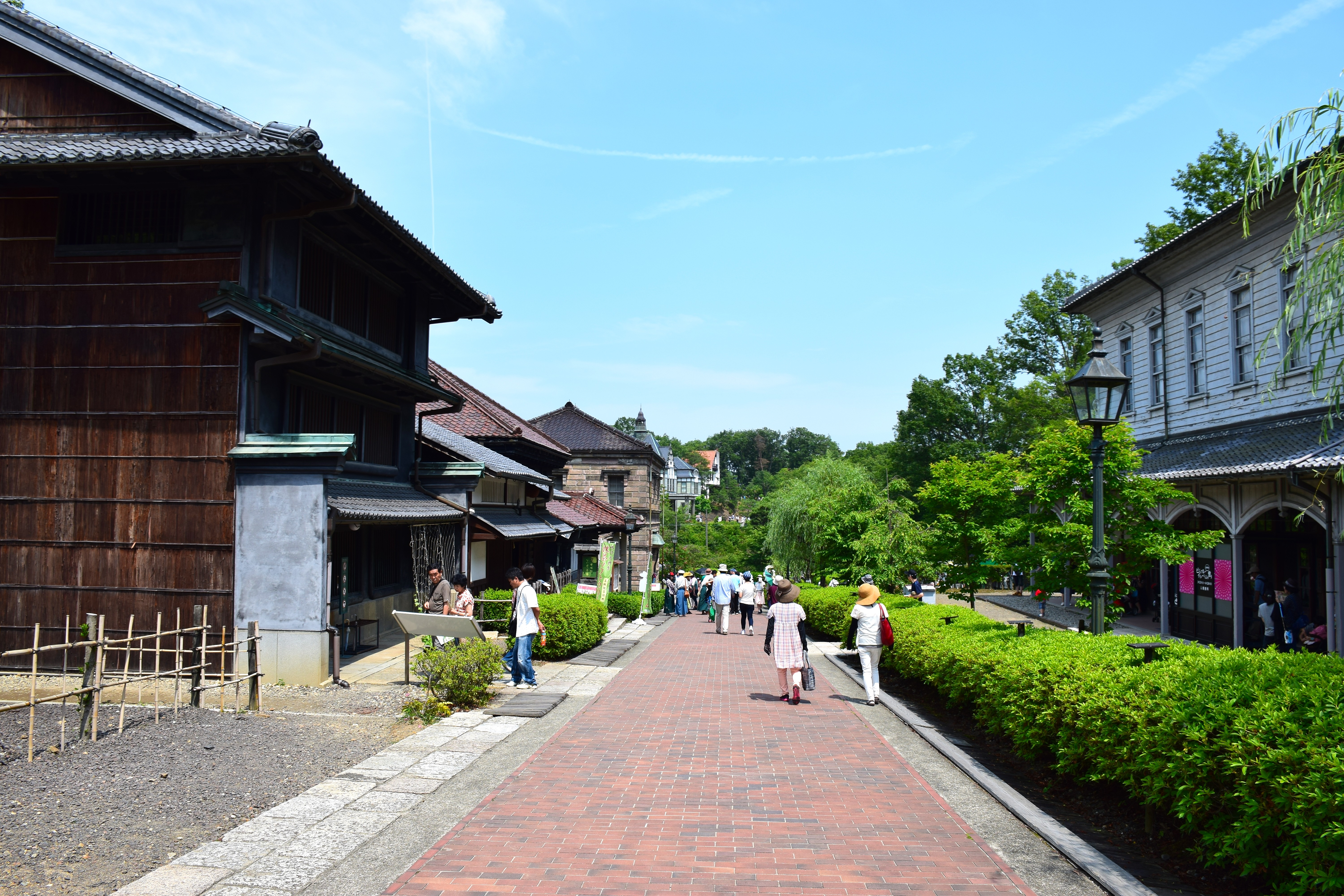
Main street of the village

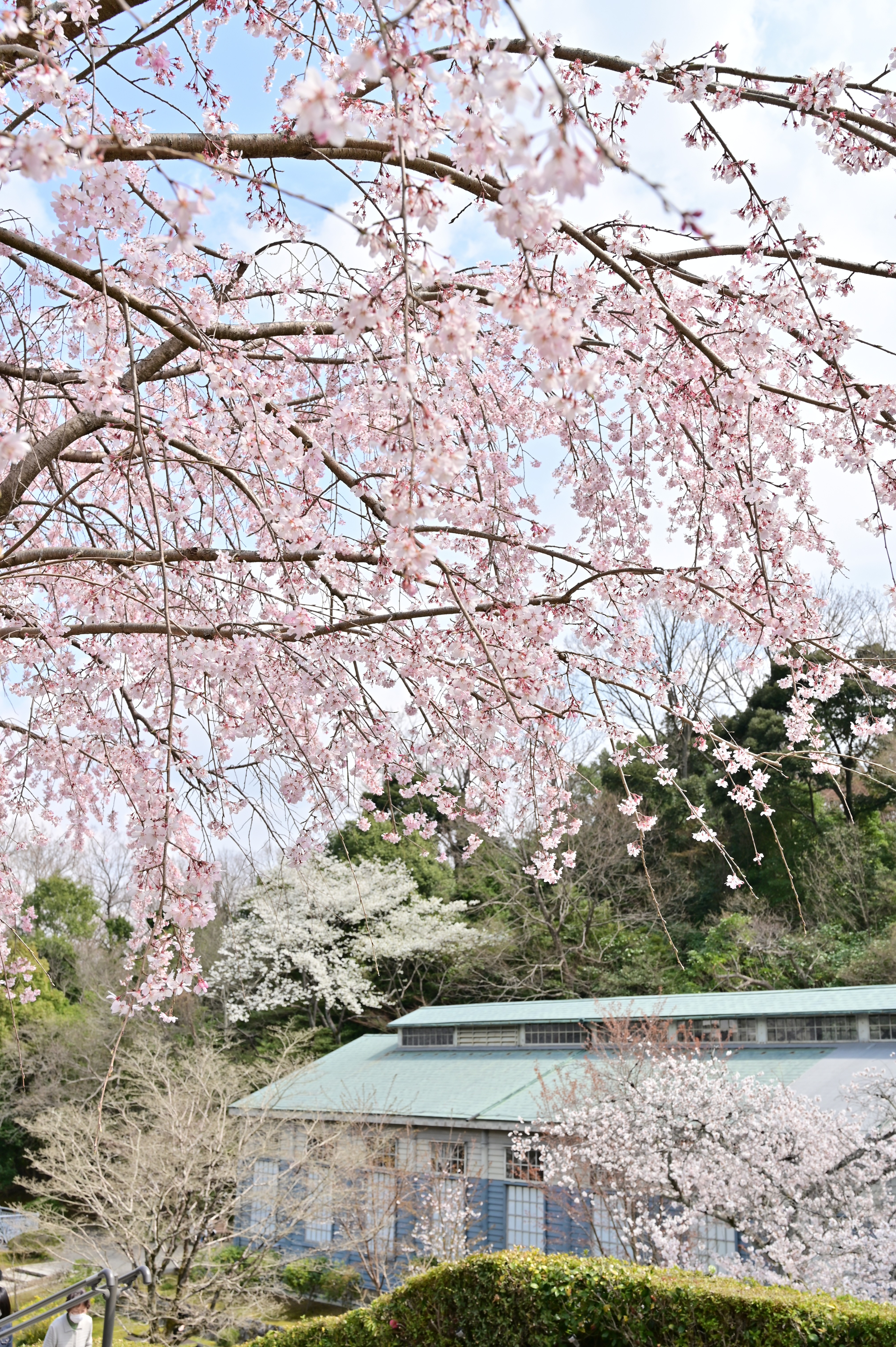
Approximately 1,000 cherry blossoms bloom in the village during the spring. Pictured is the Shimbashi Factory of the Japan Railway Bureau.

The Meiji era was a period of rapid change in Japan. After centuries of isolation, Japan began to incorporate ideas from the west, including building styles and construction techniques.

Meiji-mura was the brainchild of Yoshirō Taniguchi (谷口 吉郎 Taniguchi Yoshirō 1904–79), an architect, and Motoo Tsuchikawa (土川元夫 Tsuchikawa Moto-o, 1903–74), then-vice president and later president of Nagoya Railroad (Meitetsu). While riding the Yamanote line in Tokyo, Taniguchi lamented the sight of the Rokumeikan, a symbol of Meiji-era architecture, being demolished. He appealed to his college classmate Tsuchikawa to join him in working to preserve Western-style Meiji-era buildings of cultural and historical importance. On July 16, 1962, they formed a foundation for this purpose, with Nagoya Railroad providing the funding. Meiji-mura was opened on March 18, 1965 on the banks of the Lake Iruka reservoir, operated under Nagoya Railroad with Taniguchi as museum director, with 15 buildings.

Meiji-mura's goal is to preserve these historic early examples of western architecture mixed with Japanese construction techniques and materials. Incidentally, many of the buildings were saved from demolition during the post-World War II period, another time of transition and rapid progress in Japanese history.

Though it is still operated by Nagoya Railroad, a subsidiary company was created in 2003 to oversee it and nearby Little World. Due to the recent financial declines with Nagoya Railroad, the future of the park is in question. While renovations had been put on hold for a time, work on moving the Shibakawa Mataemon Residence (built 1911, heavily damaged in the 1995 Kobe earthquake) from Nishinomiya, Hyōgo Prefecture began in January 2005 and was completed in 2007.

== Buildings ==
Notable structures of historical or cultural importance, including both older Japanese-style buildings and later Japanese-Western architecture, are preserved. Eleven of the buildings are designated as Important Cultural Properties, and nearly all the rest are registered as Tangible Cultural Properties. The museum includes buildings from Hawaii and Seattle in the United States, as well as Brazil. A steam locomotive and vintage Kyoto streetcar, along with shuttle buses and horse-drawn carriages, provide transportation within the grounds. An operational historic post office is included among the 67 buildings (as of 2005). Though some buildings have somewhat empty interiors, others have displays showing the building's history, period furniture, and other displays.

The entrance and lobby of the Imperial Hotel was saved and moved from Tokyo between 1967 and 1985. Though only the entrance and lobby remain, it is the largest structure in Meiji-mura.

Other structures preserved at Meiji Mura include Lafcadio Hearn's summer house from Shizuoka (1868), St. John's Church from Kyoto (1907) designed by James McDonald Gardiner, and Kyoto's old St. Francis Xavier Catholic Cathedral (1890). The former cathedral is available to rent for weddings.

One of the traditional merchant houses that survived from Nagoya is the Tōmatsu House (東松家住宅, Tōmatsu-ka jūtaku), which was constructed in 1901 in Funairi-chō, Nagoya. It survived the bombing of Nagoya in World War II and was relocated to the museum in the 1970s. It has been designated by the government as an Important Cultural Property.

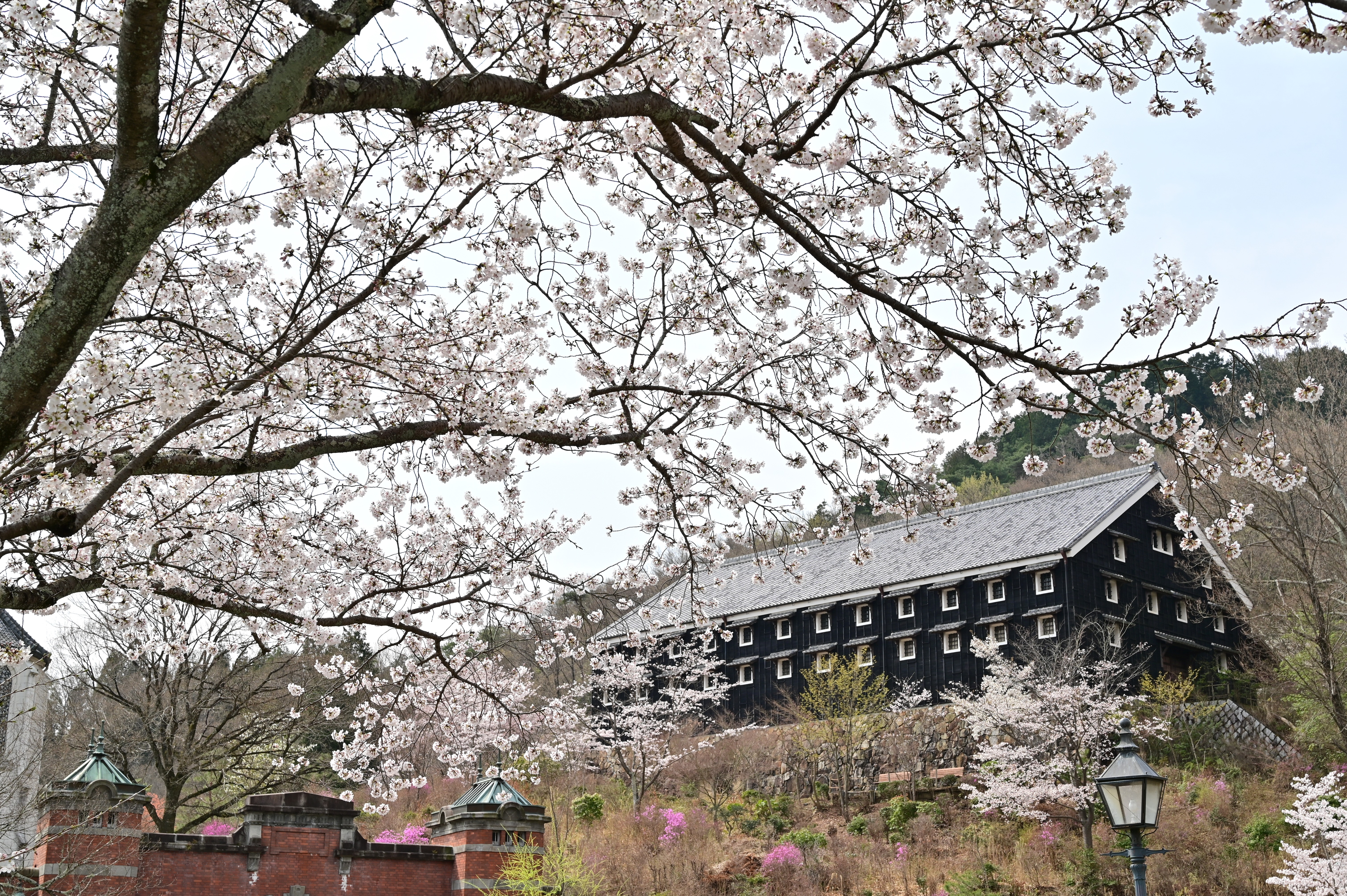
Kikunoyo Brewery, from Hekinan

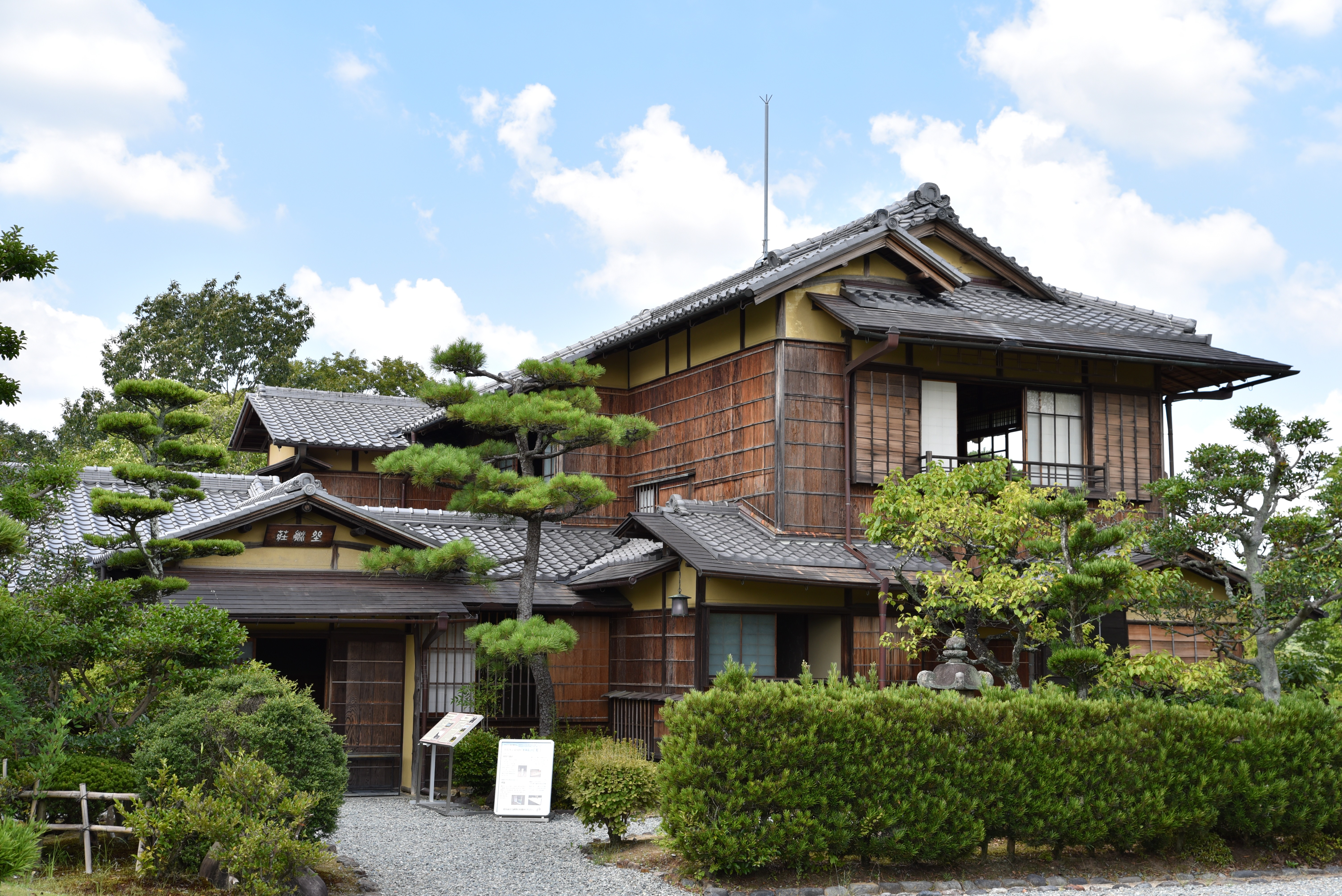
"Zagyo-so," Villa of Prince Kimmochi Saionji, from Shimizu-ku, Shizuoka

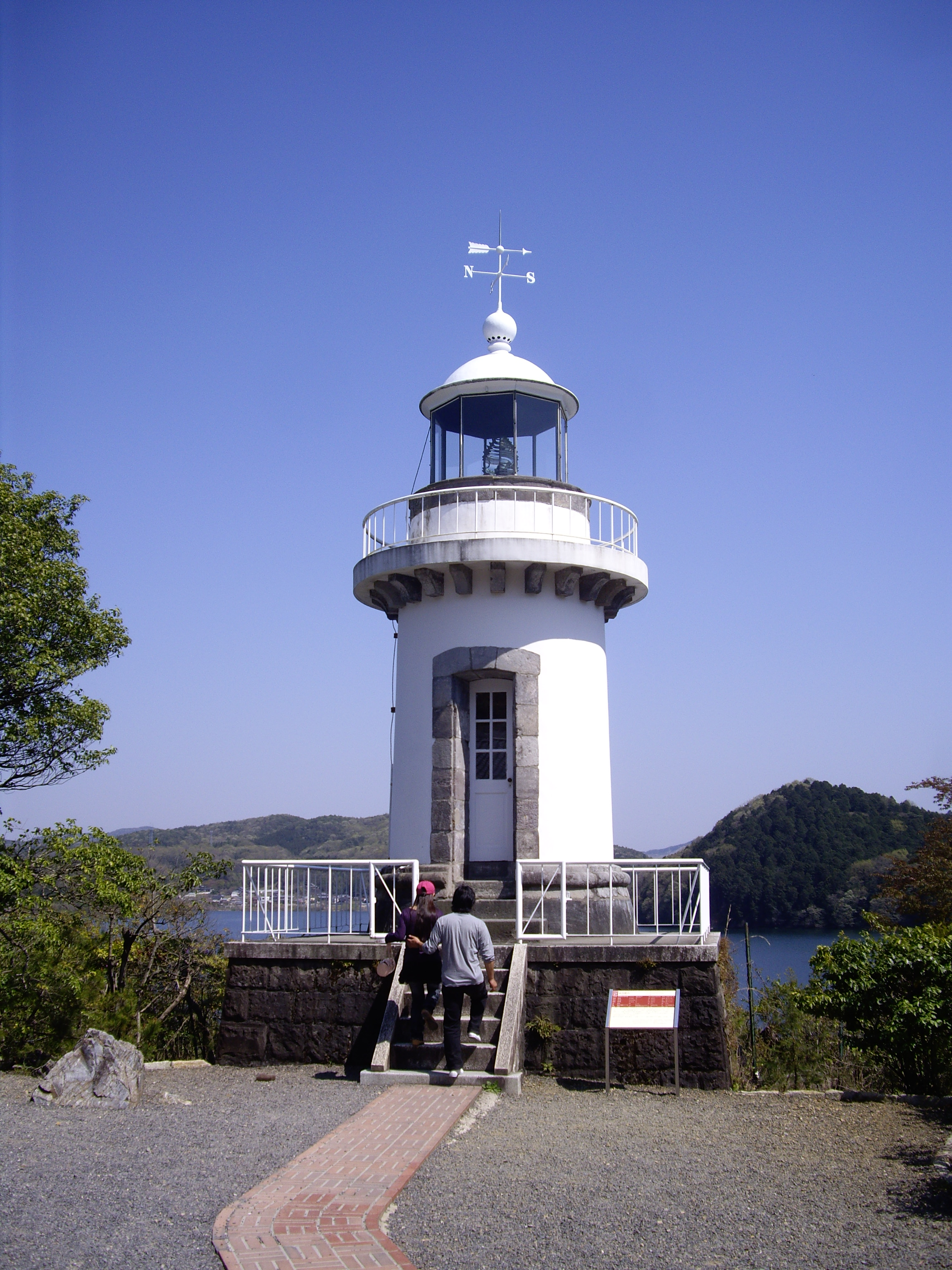
Shinagawa Lighthouse, from Shinagawa, Tokyo, built 1870

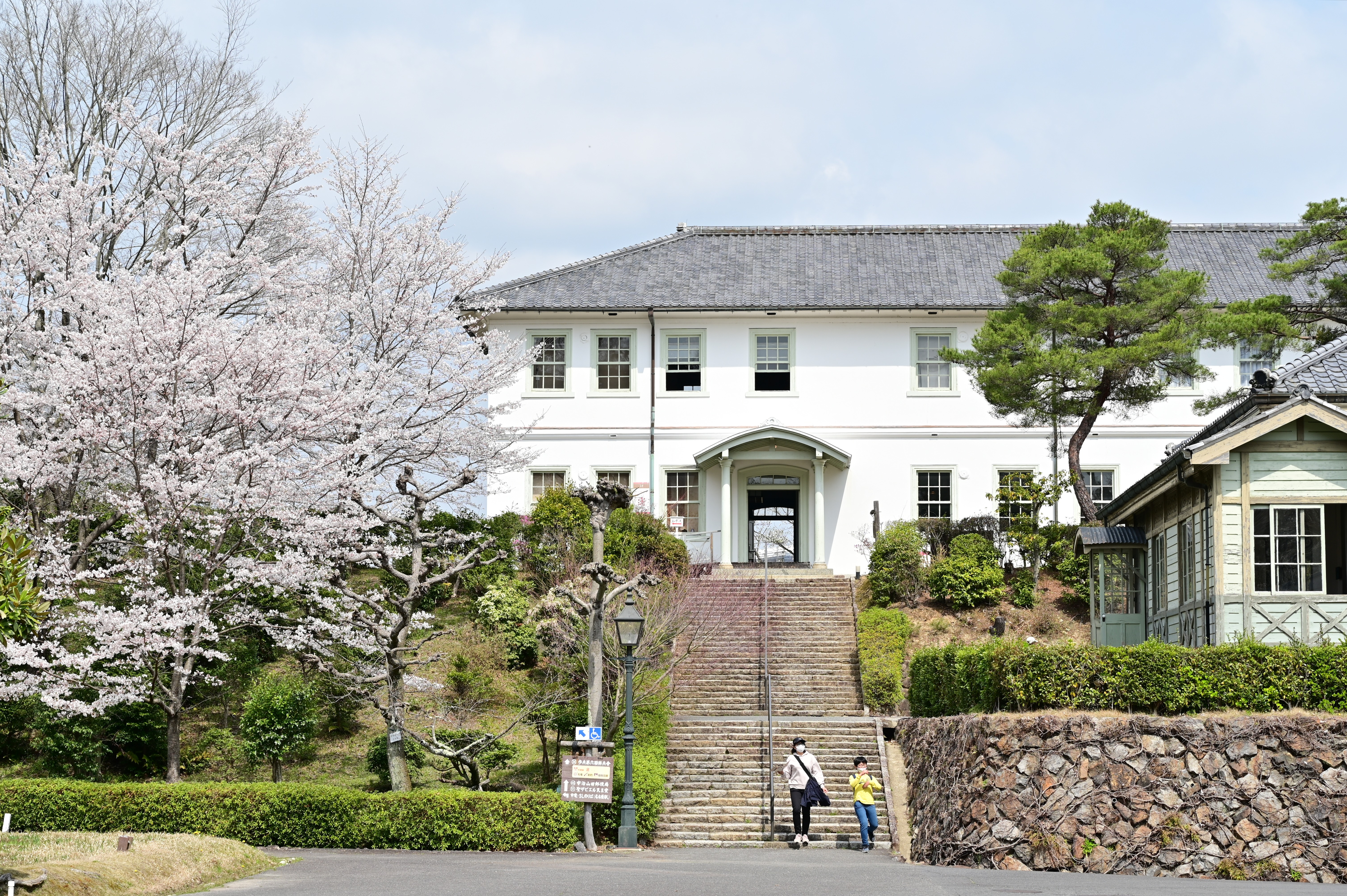
Barracks of the 6th Infantry Regiment, 10th Company, 3rd Division, from Nagoya, built 1873

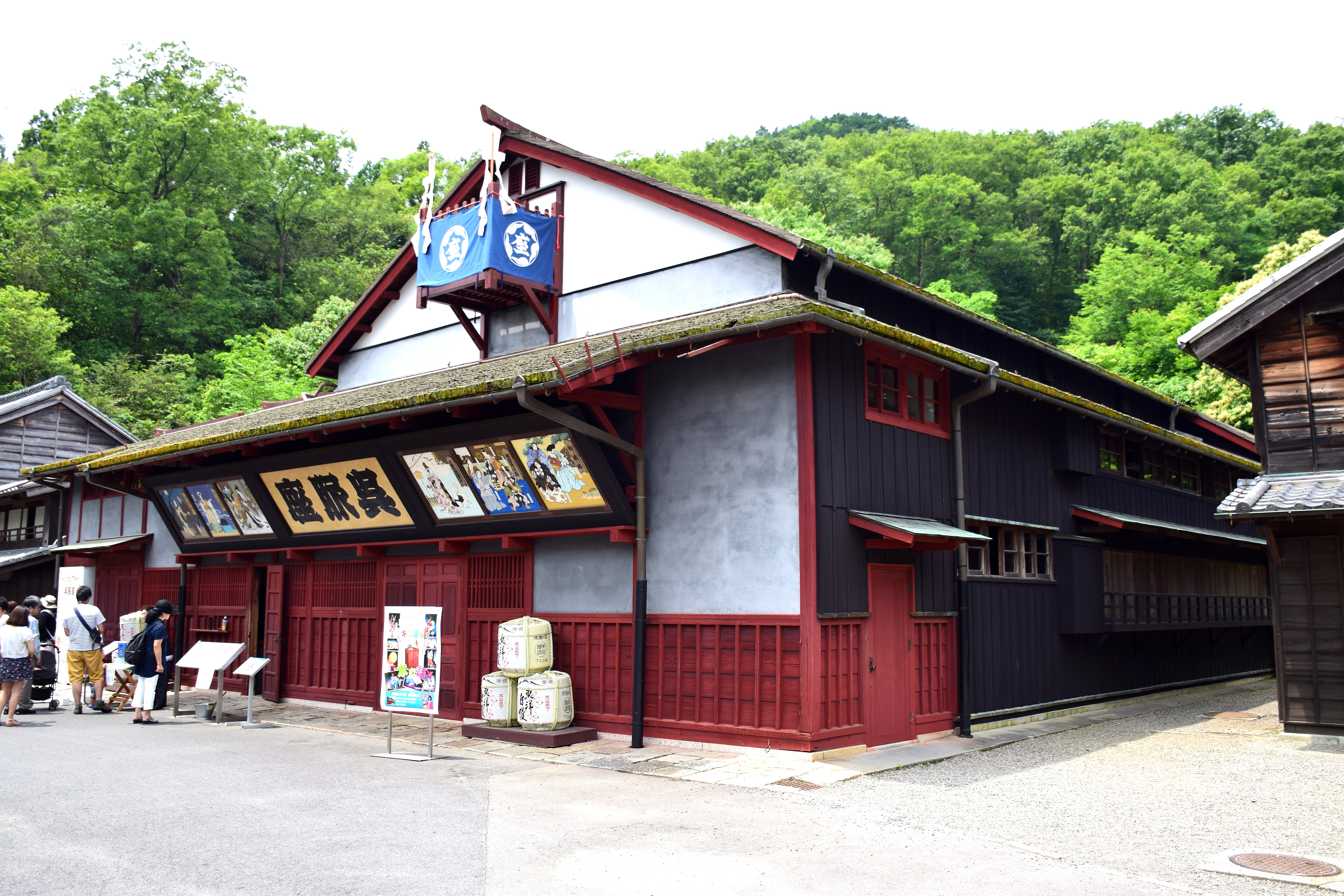
Kureha-za Theater, from Ikeda, Osaka, built 1874

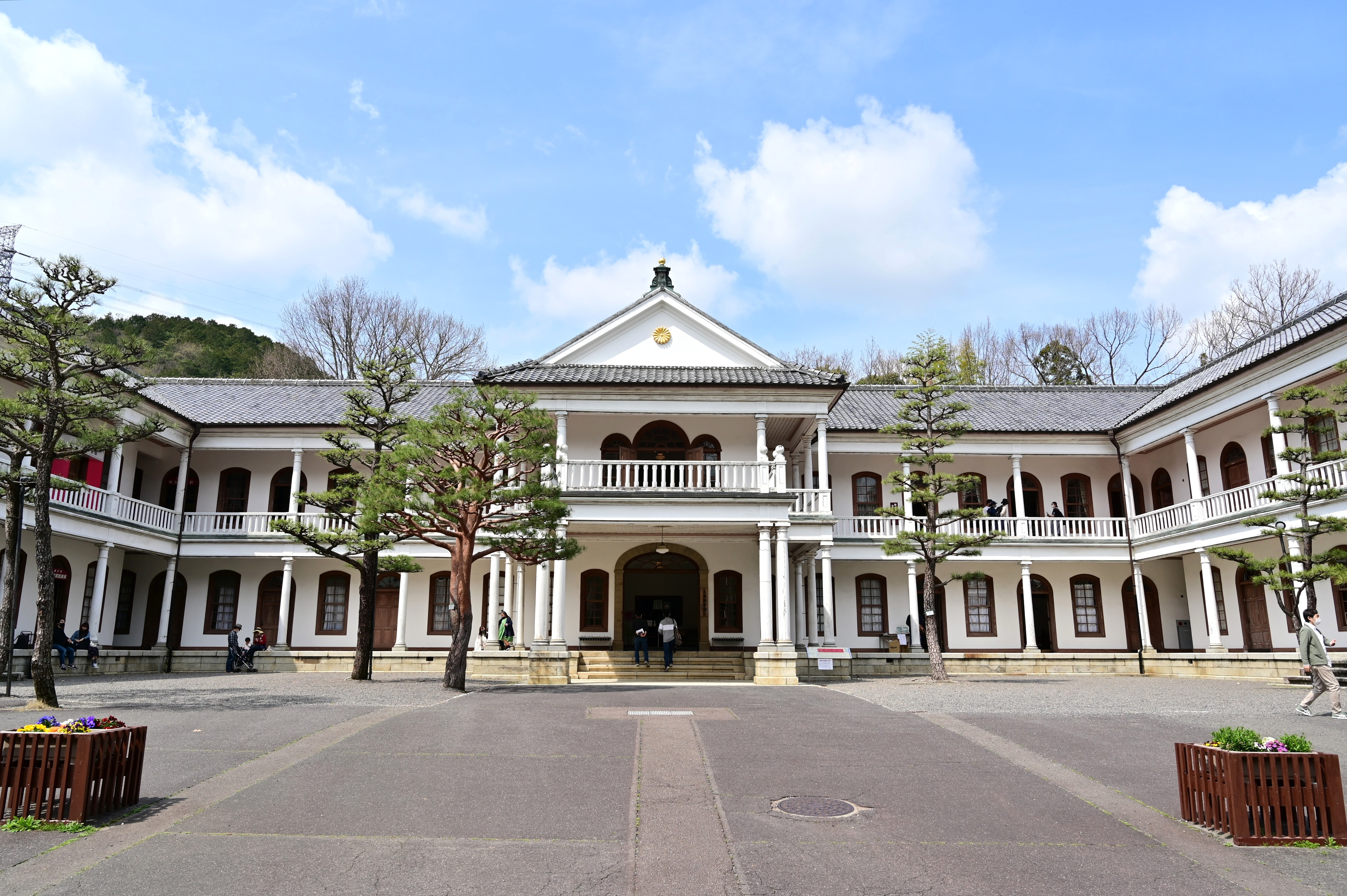
Mie Prefectural Office, from Tsu, built 1879

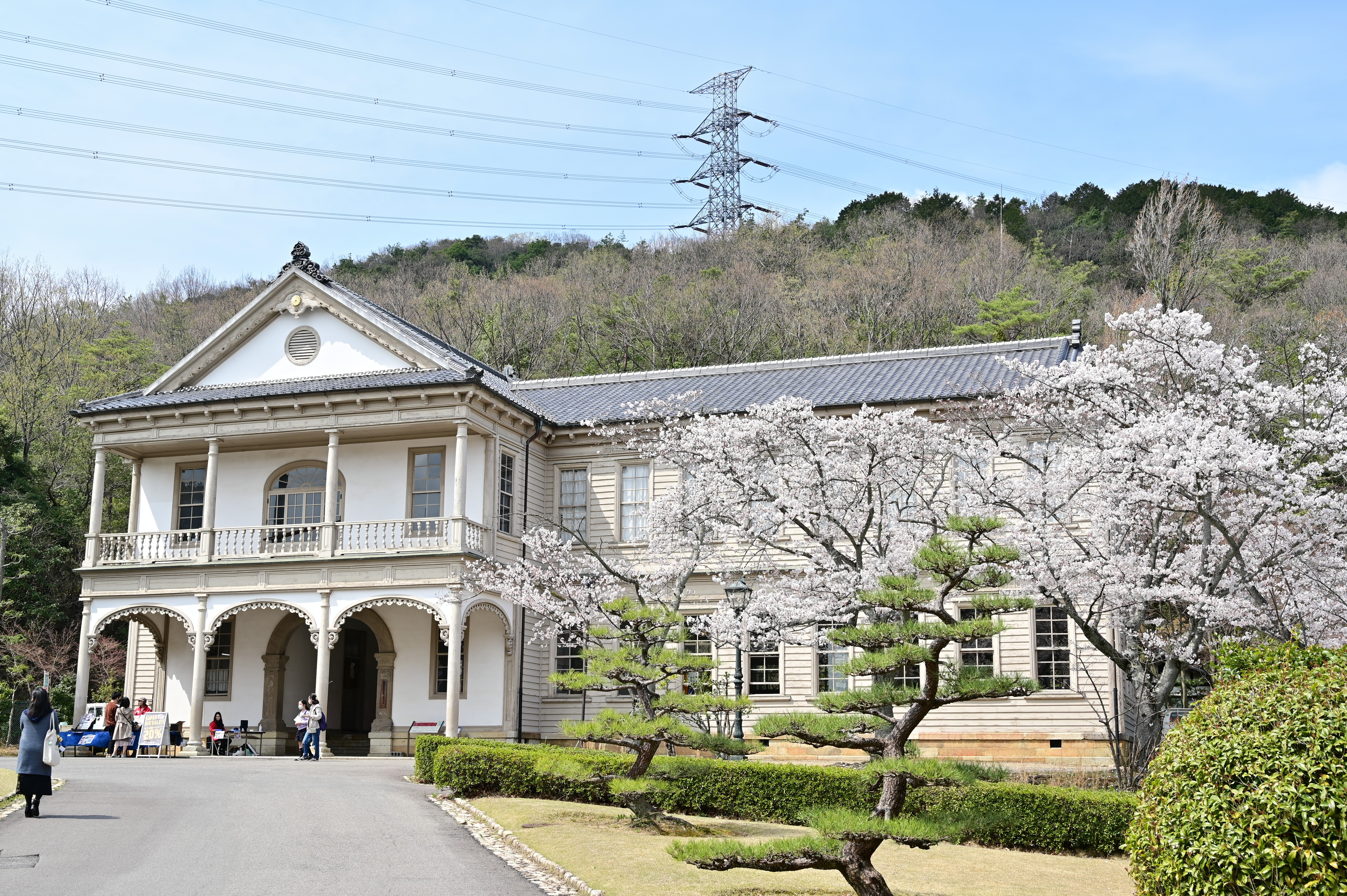
Mie Prefectural Normal School, from Tsu, built 1888

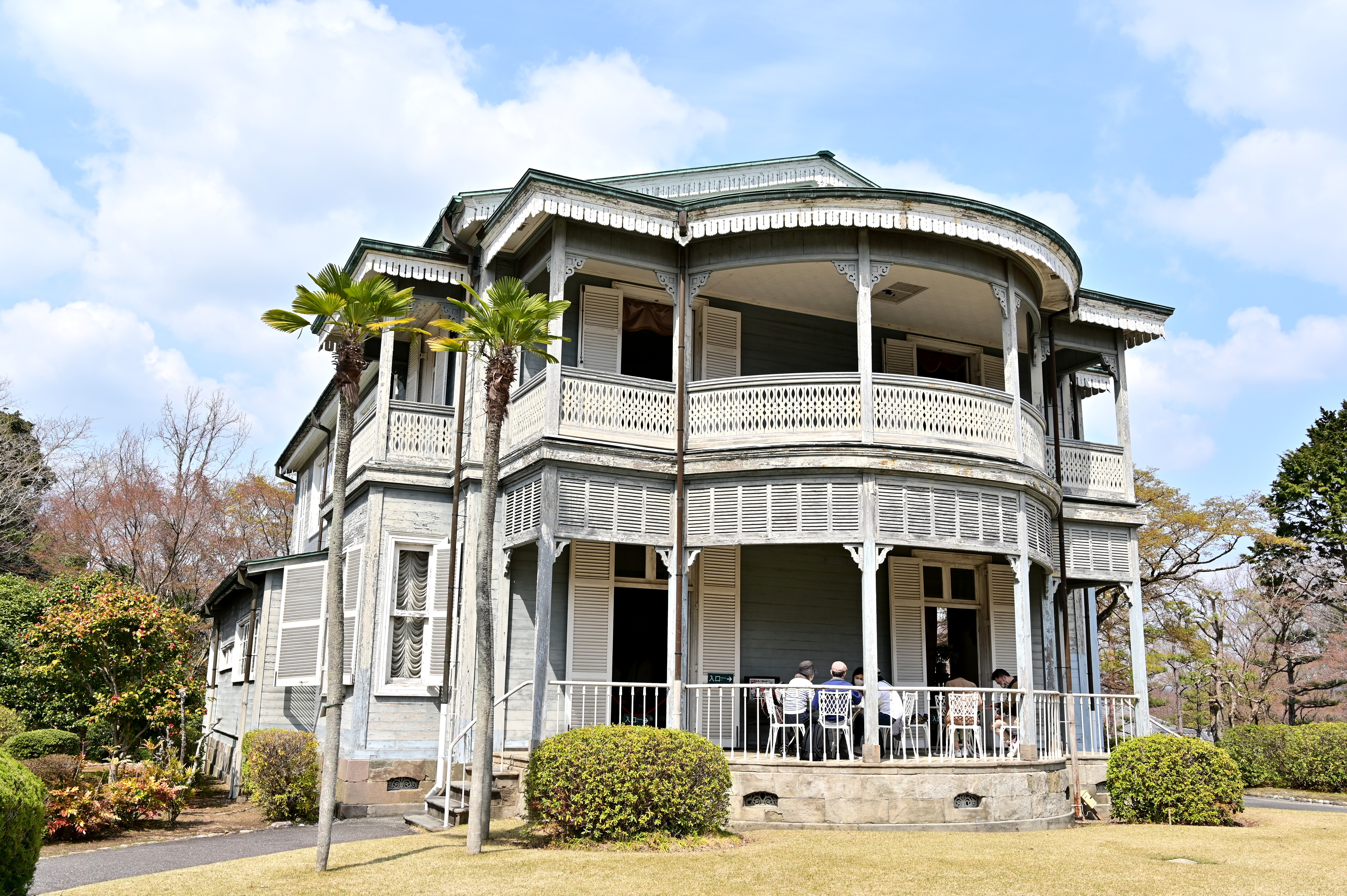
Residence of Marquis Tsugumichi Saigo, from Meguro, Tokyo, built 1882

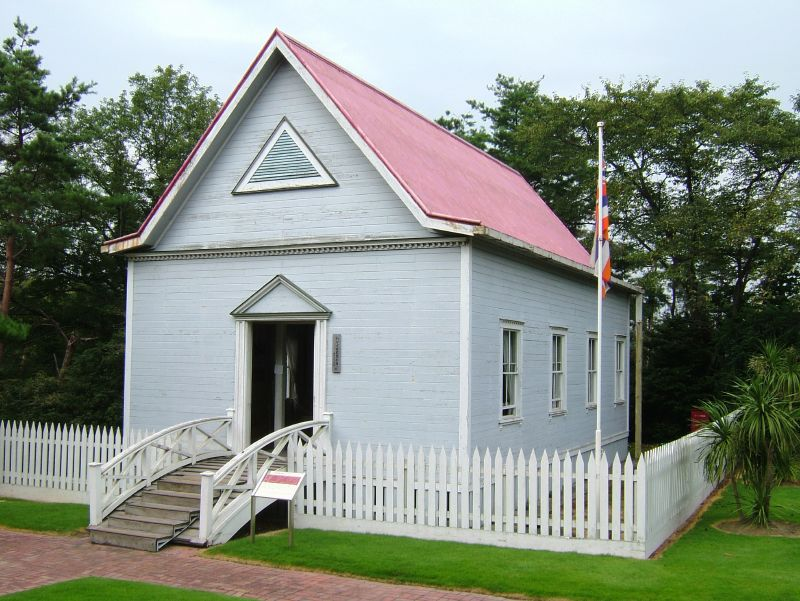
Japanese Immigrants' Assembly Hall, from Hilo, Hawai'i, built 1889

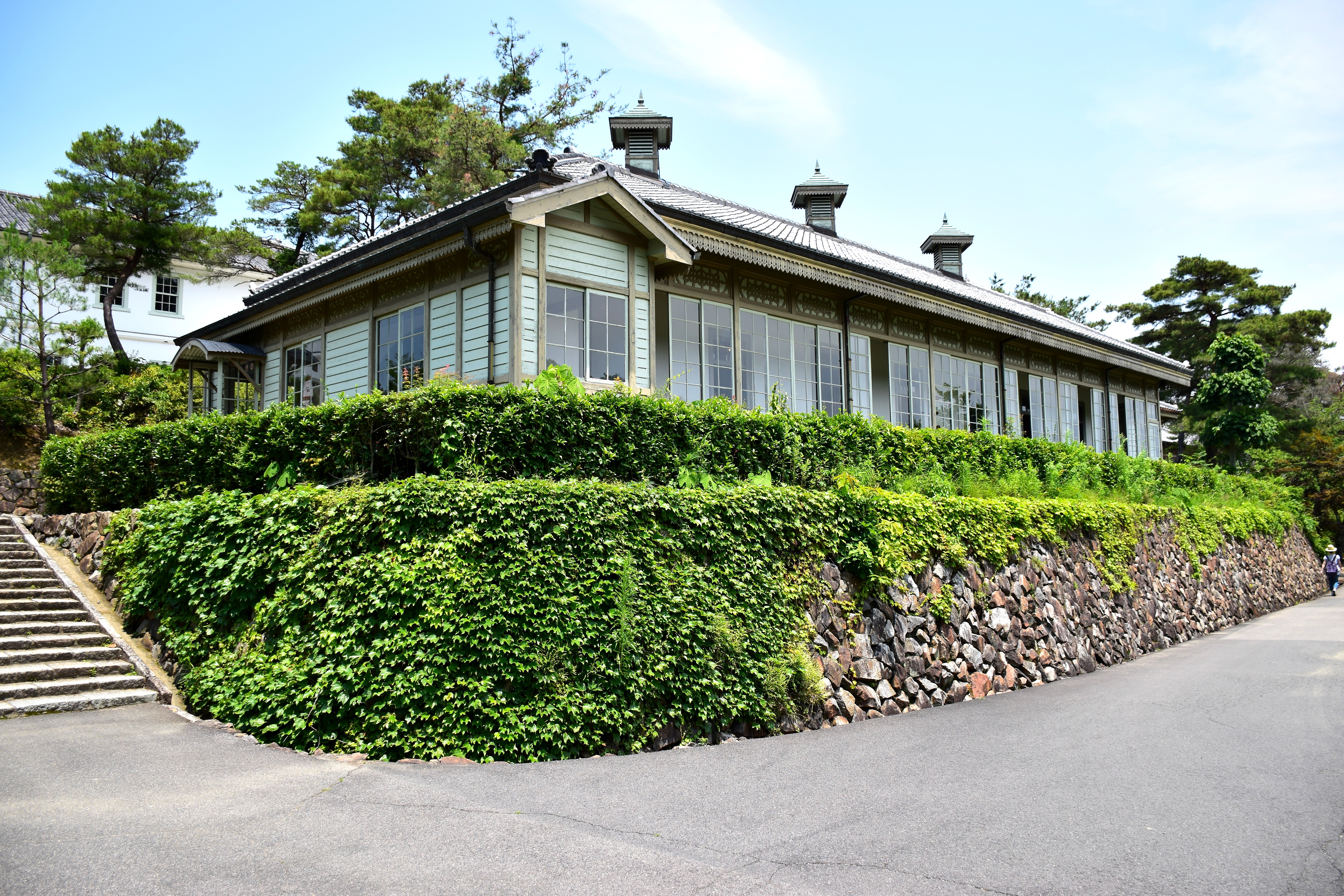
Ward of the Japanese Red Cross Society Central Hospital, from Shibuya, Tokyo, built 1891

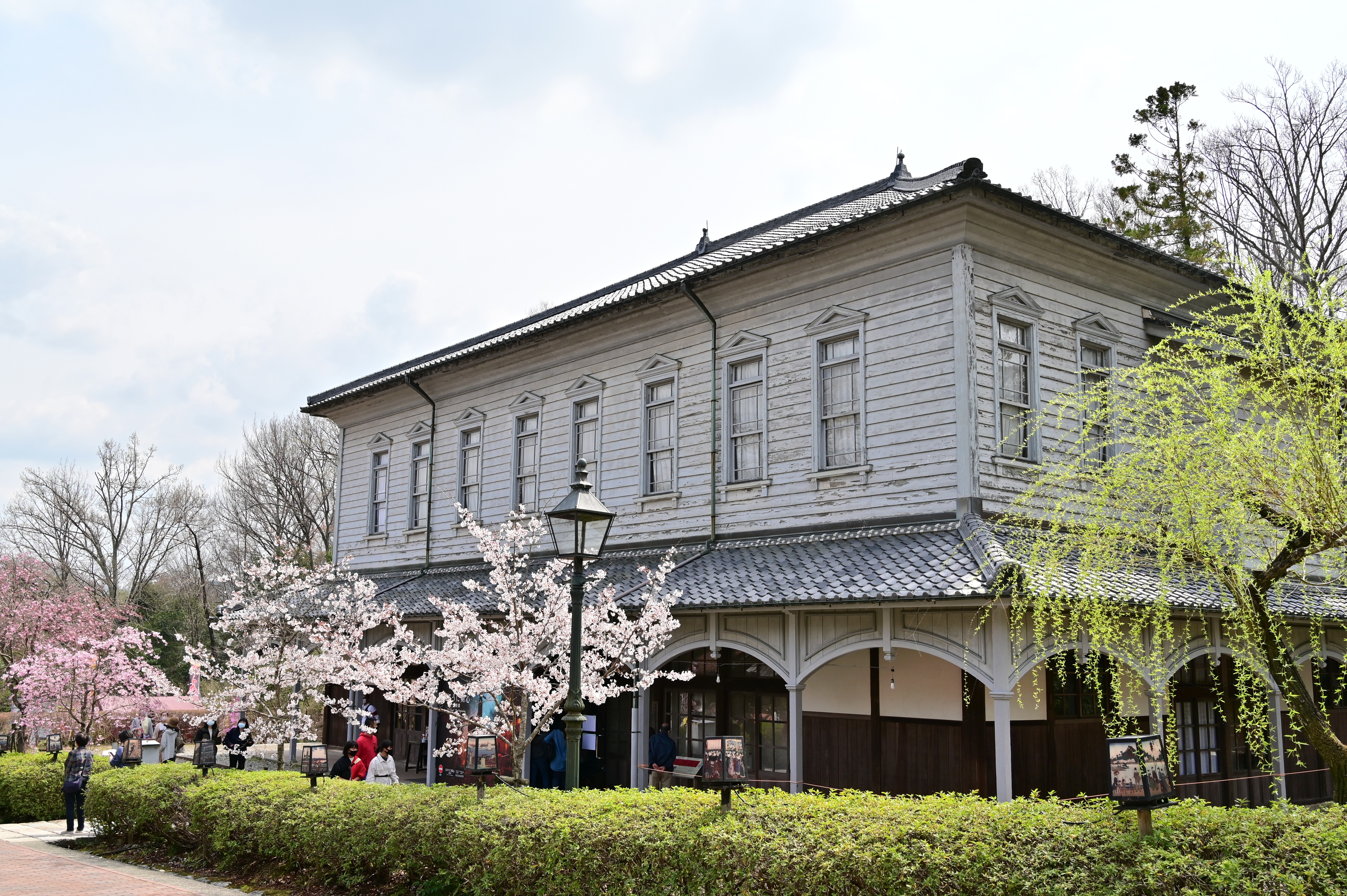
Auditorium of Chihaya-Akasaka Primary School, from Chihayaakasaka, built 1897

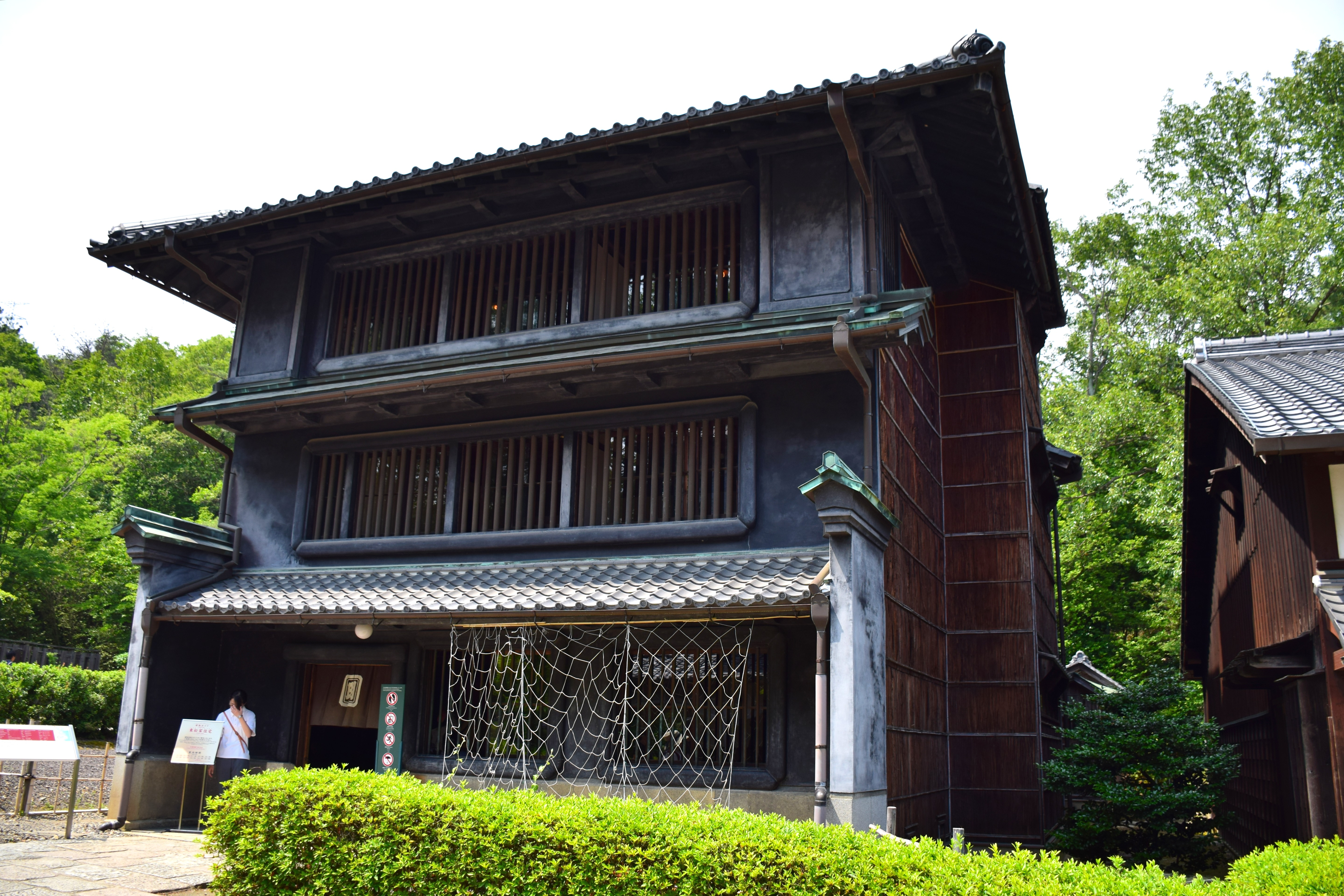
Tōmatsu House, from Funairi-chō, Nagoya, built 1901

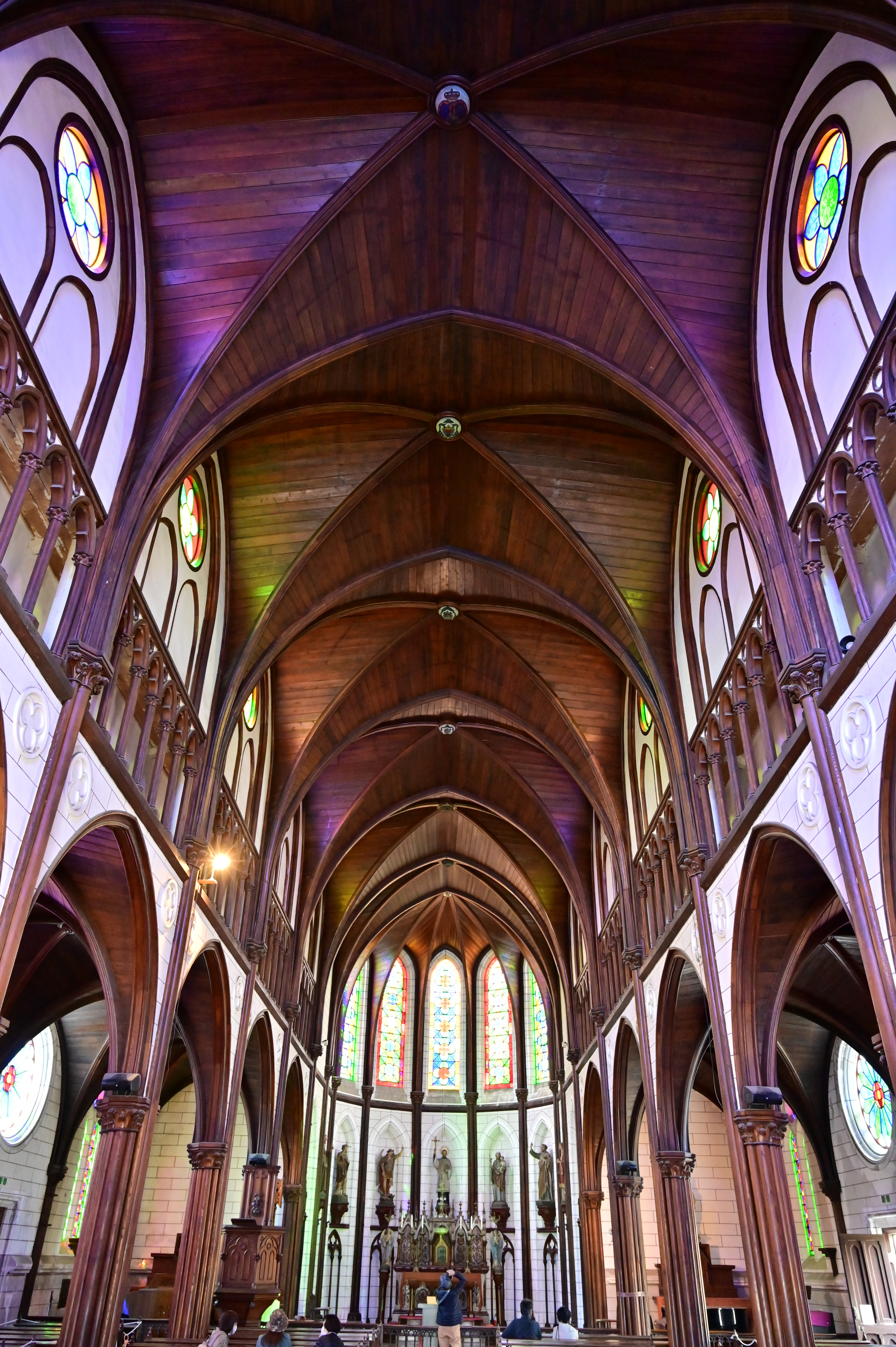
St. Francis Xavier Cathedral, from Kyoto, built 1890

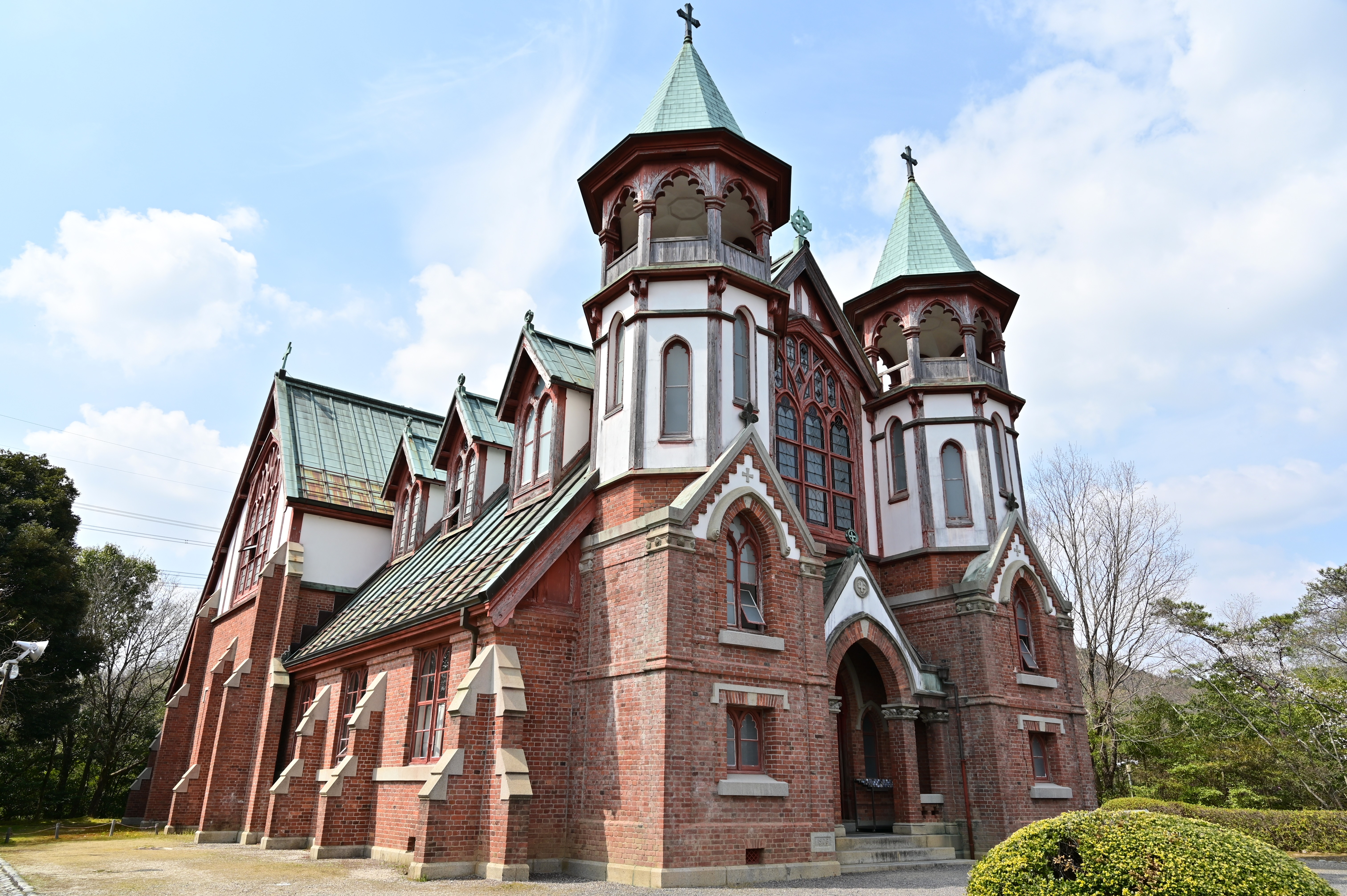
St. John's Church, from Kyoto, built 1907

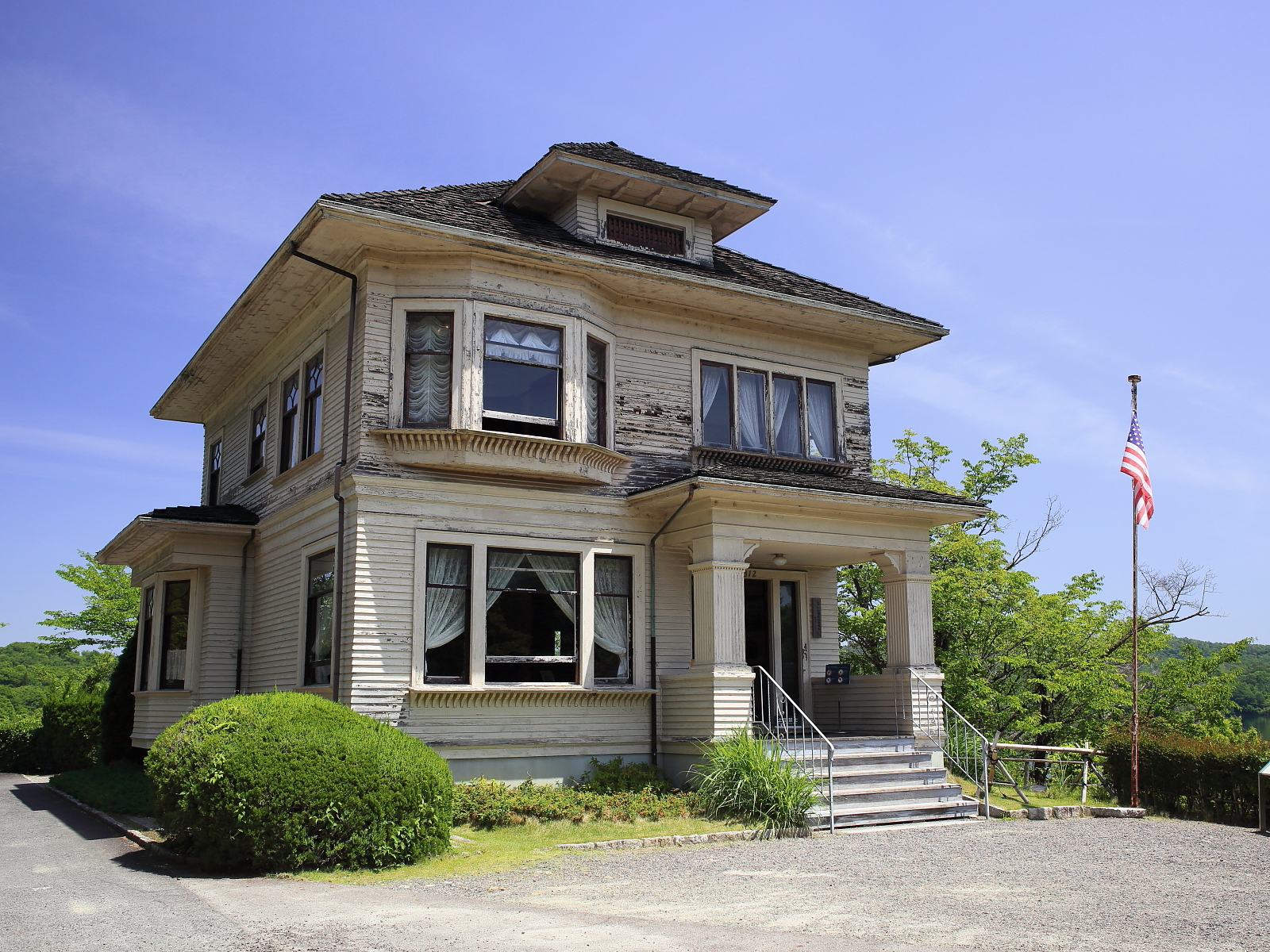
Seattle Nikkei Evangelical Church, from Seattle, Washington, built 1908

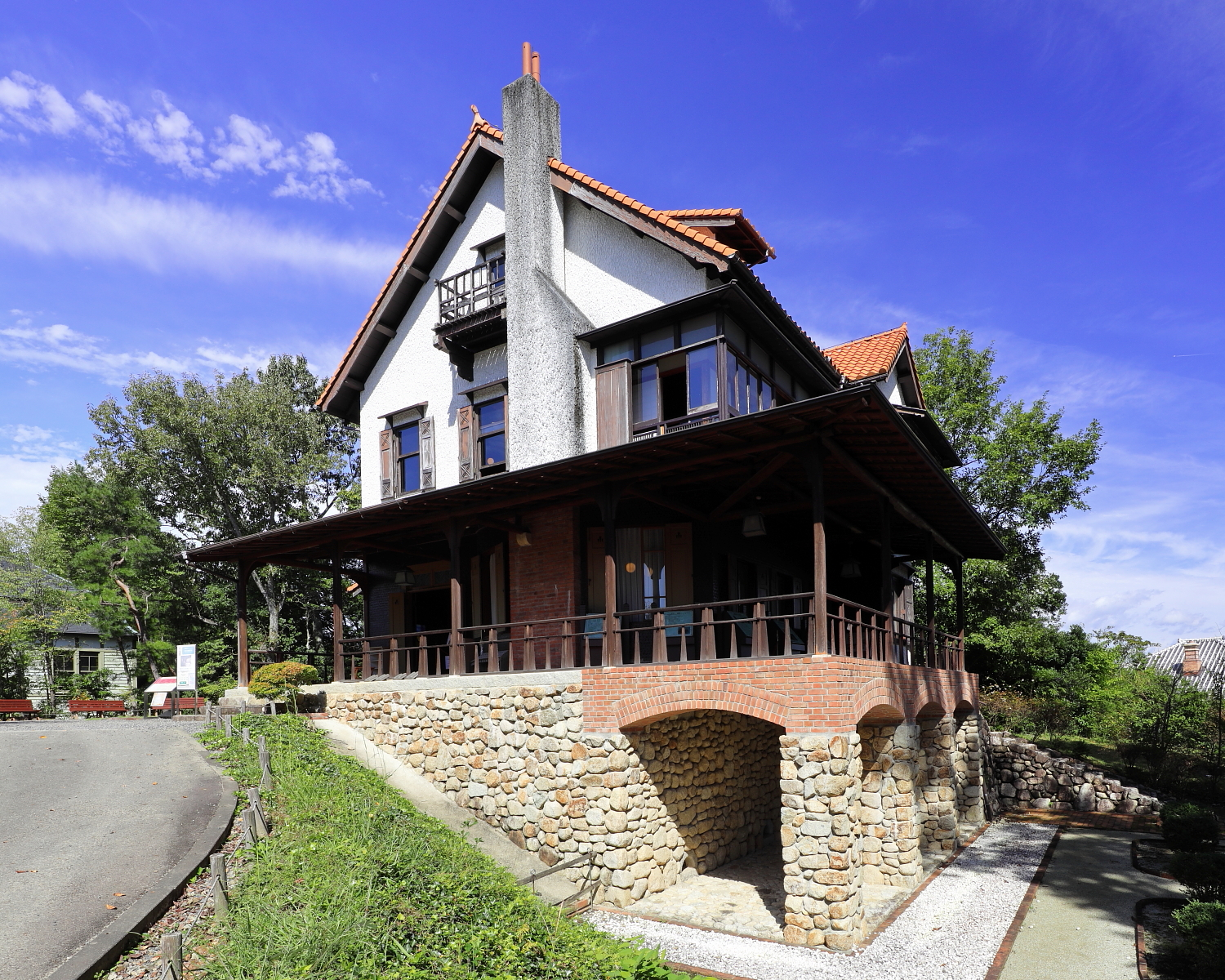
Villa of Shibakawa Mataemon, from Kōtōen, Nishinomiya, built 1911

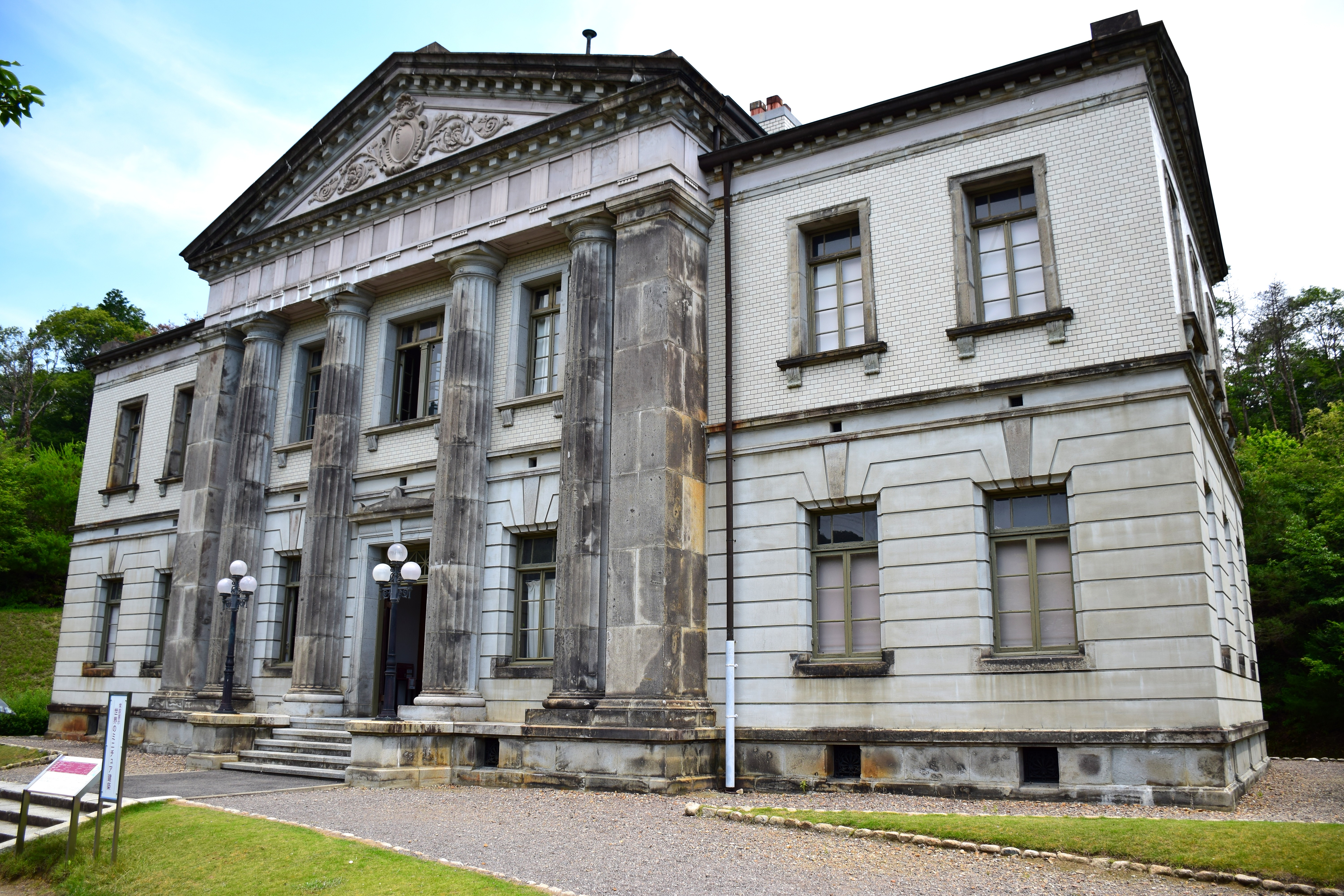
Cabinet Library of the Tokyo Imperial Palace, from Chiyoda, Tokyo, built 1911

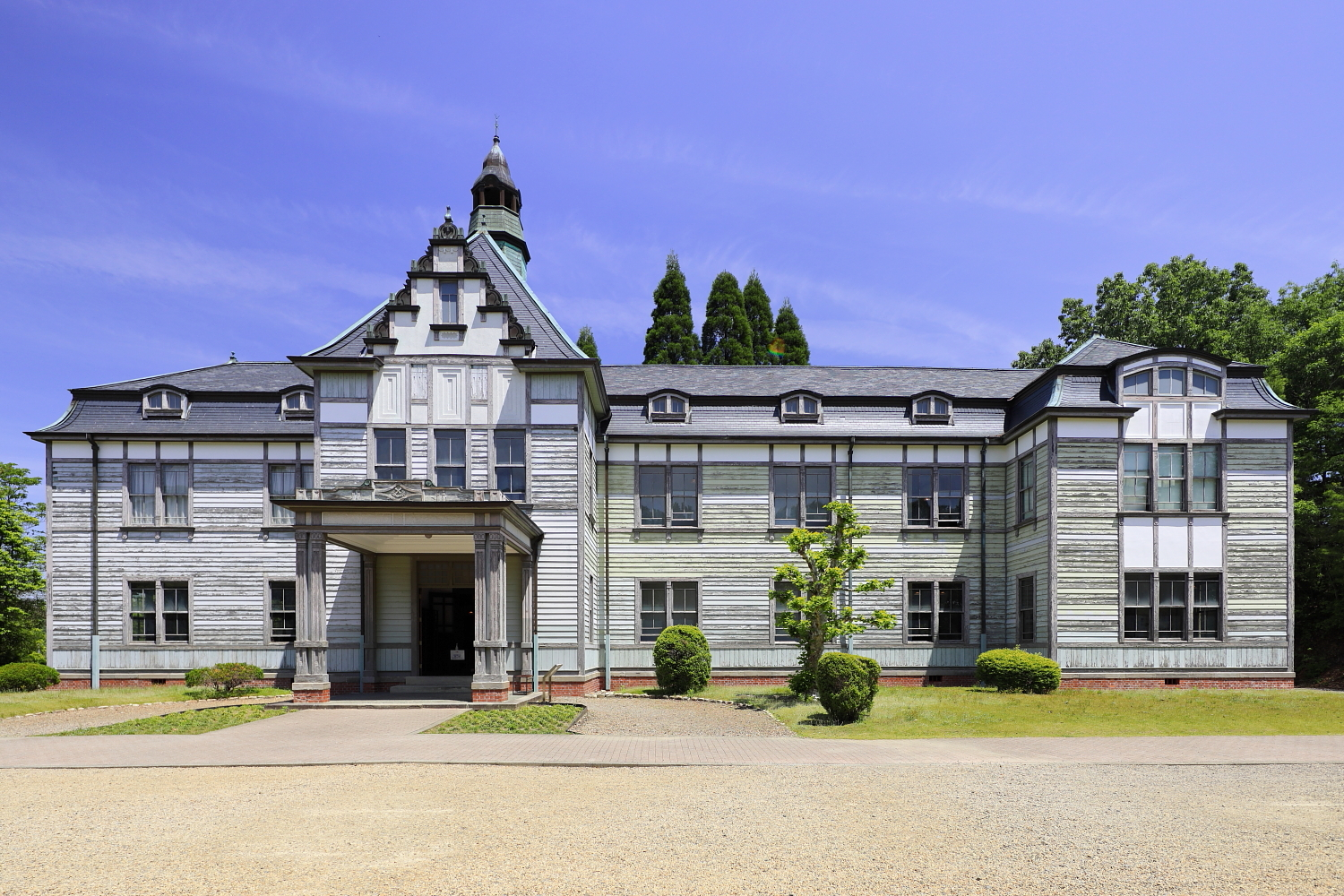
Kitasato Institute, from Minato, Tokyo, built 1915

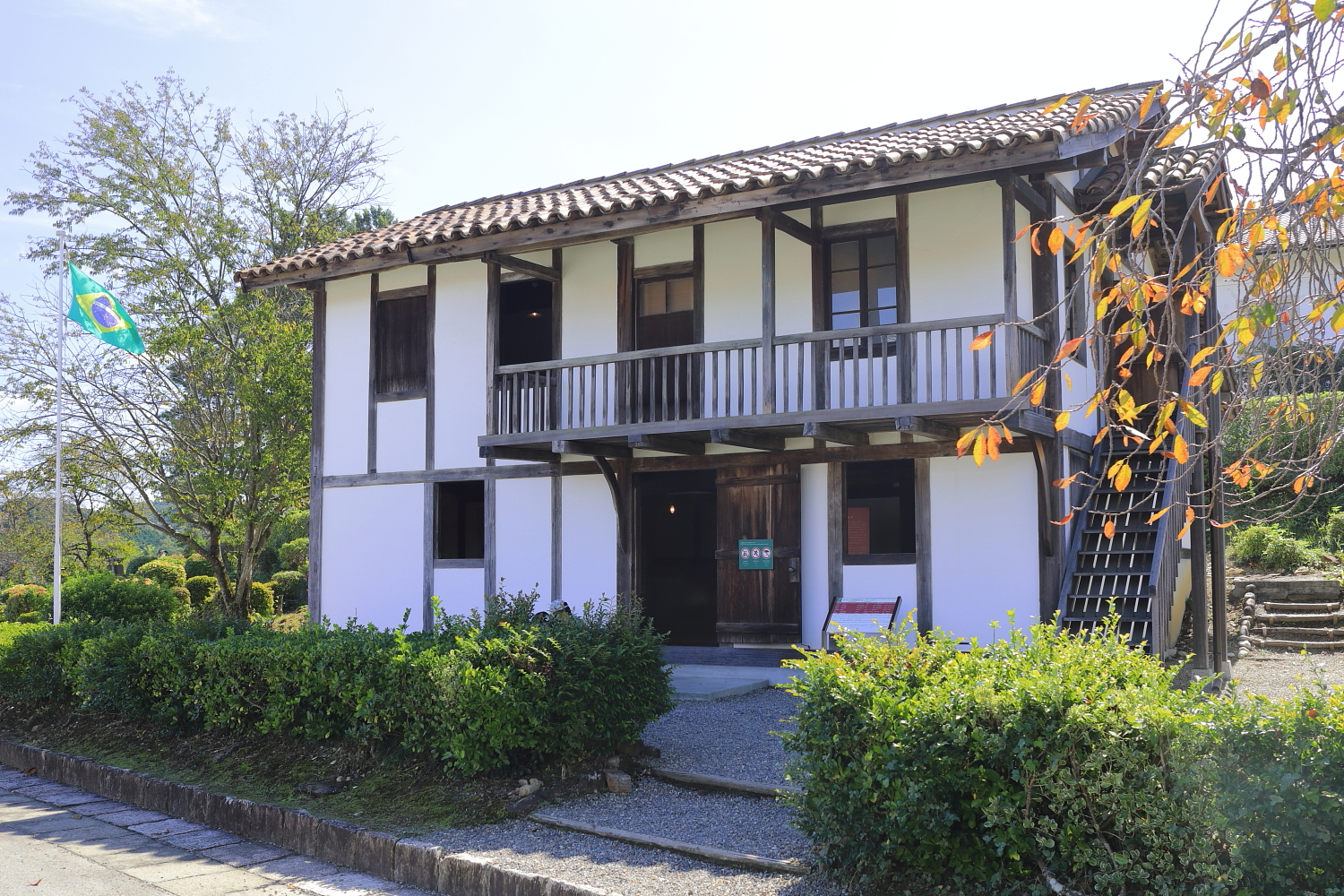
Residence of Kubota Yasuo, from Registro, São Paulo, built 1919

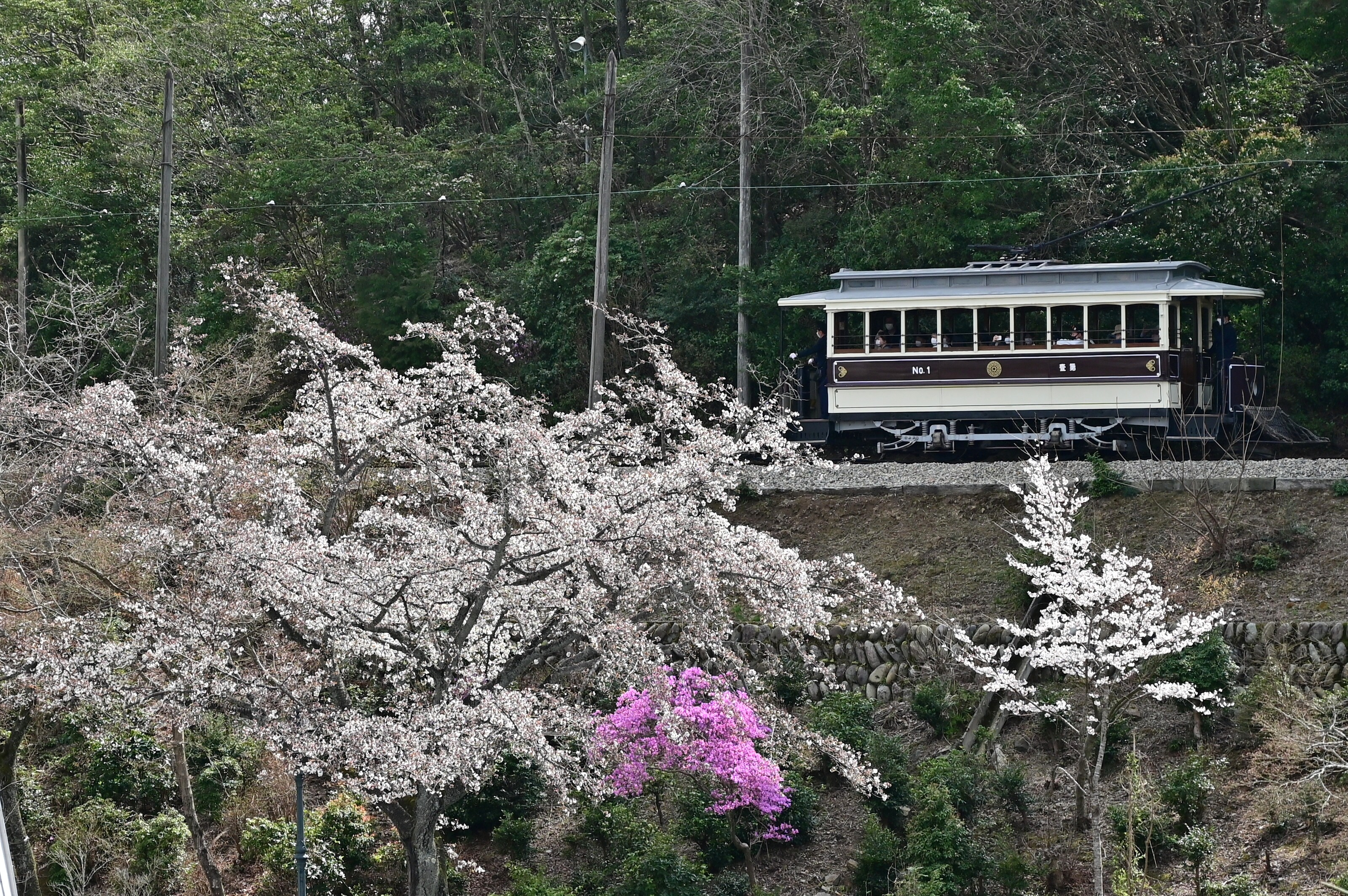
Dynamically preserved Kyoto streetcar

== Railway preservation ==
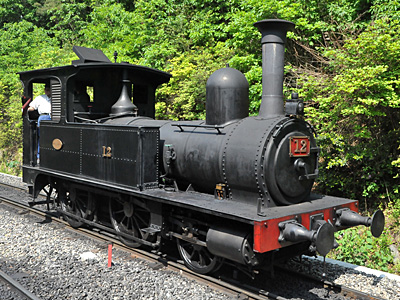
No.12, a JGR Class 160, built by Sharp, Stewart and Company in 1874

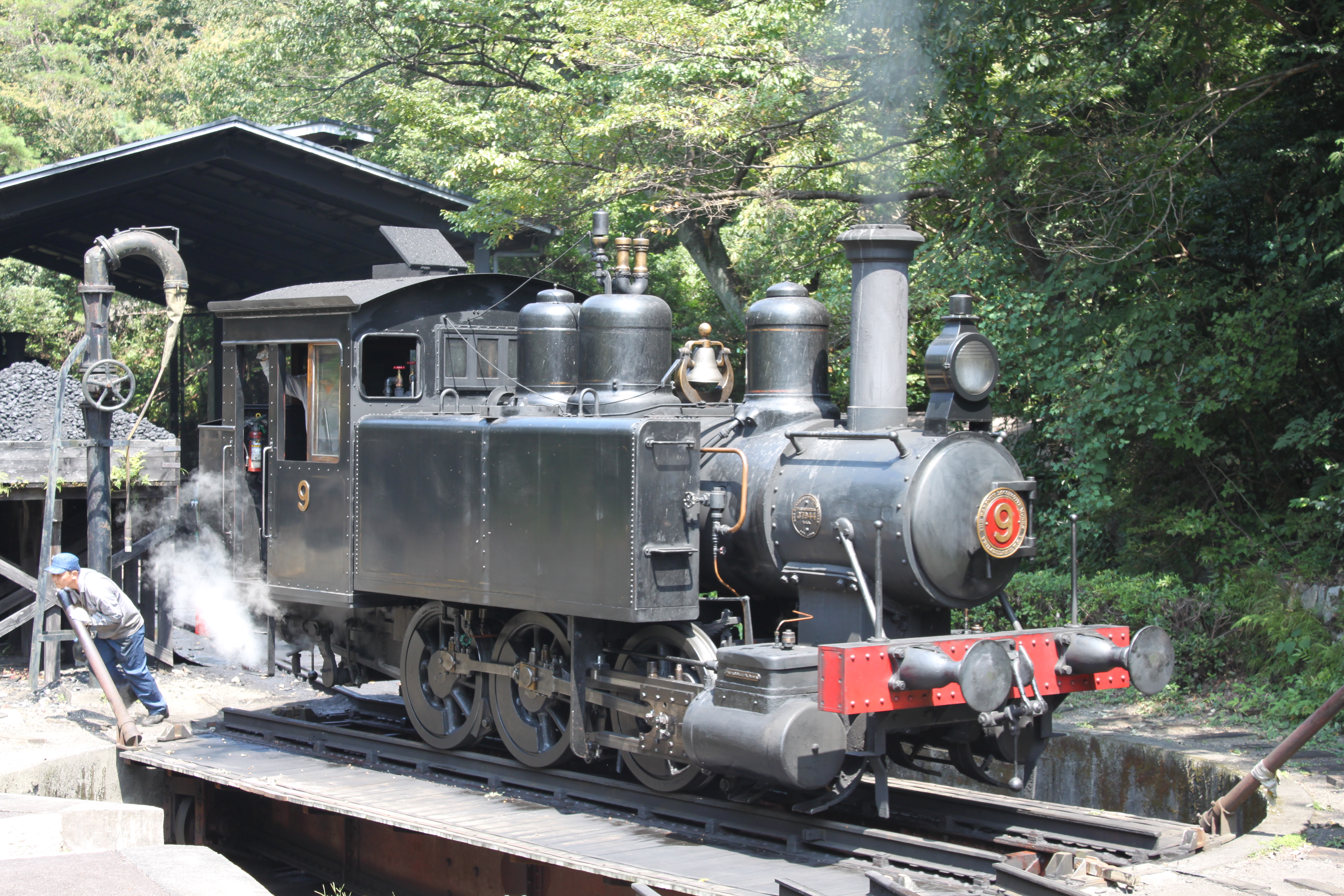
No.9, built by Baldwin Locomotive Works in 1912

The village has been active in preserving locomotives and trams from the Meiji era in working condition. Two steam locomotives are used to haul three Meiji-built carriages as a means of transport within the village: No.12, a JGR Class 160 imported from England in 1874, and No.9, a locomotive imported from the US in 1913 that operated on the Minobu line.

== Village chiefs ==
Famous Japanese actors have served as honorary village chief.

1. Musei Tokugawa (1965 ~ 1971)
2. Hisaya Morishige (1971 ~ 2004)
3. Shoichi Ozawa (2004 ~ 2012)
4. Sawako Agawa (2015 ~ present)

== See also ==
- Showa-mura
- Taisho-mura
- Treaty of Portsmouth, 1905 – see table used by Russian and Japanese negotiators
- Edo-Tokyo Open Air Architectural Museum
- Greenfield Village
