= Jōgashima =

Island in Miura, Kanagawa Prefecture, Japan

Coordinates: 35°08′06″N 139°37′12″E

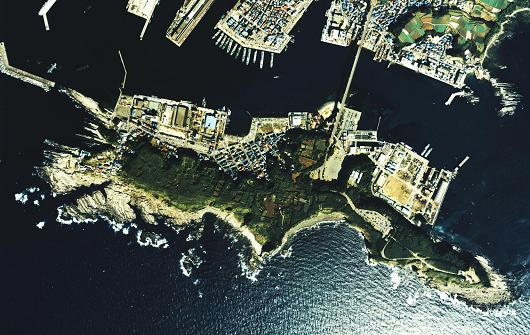
Aerial view of Jōgashima.

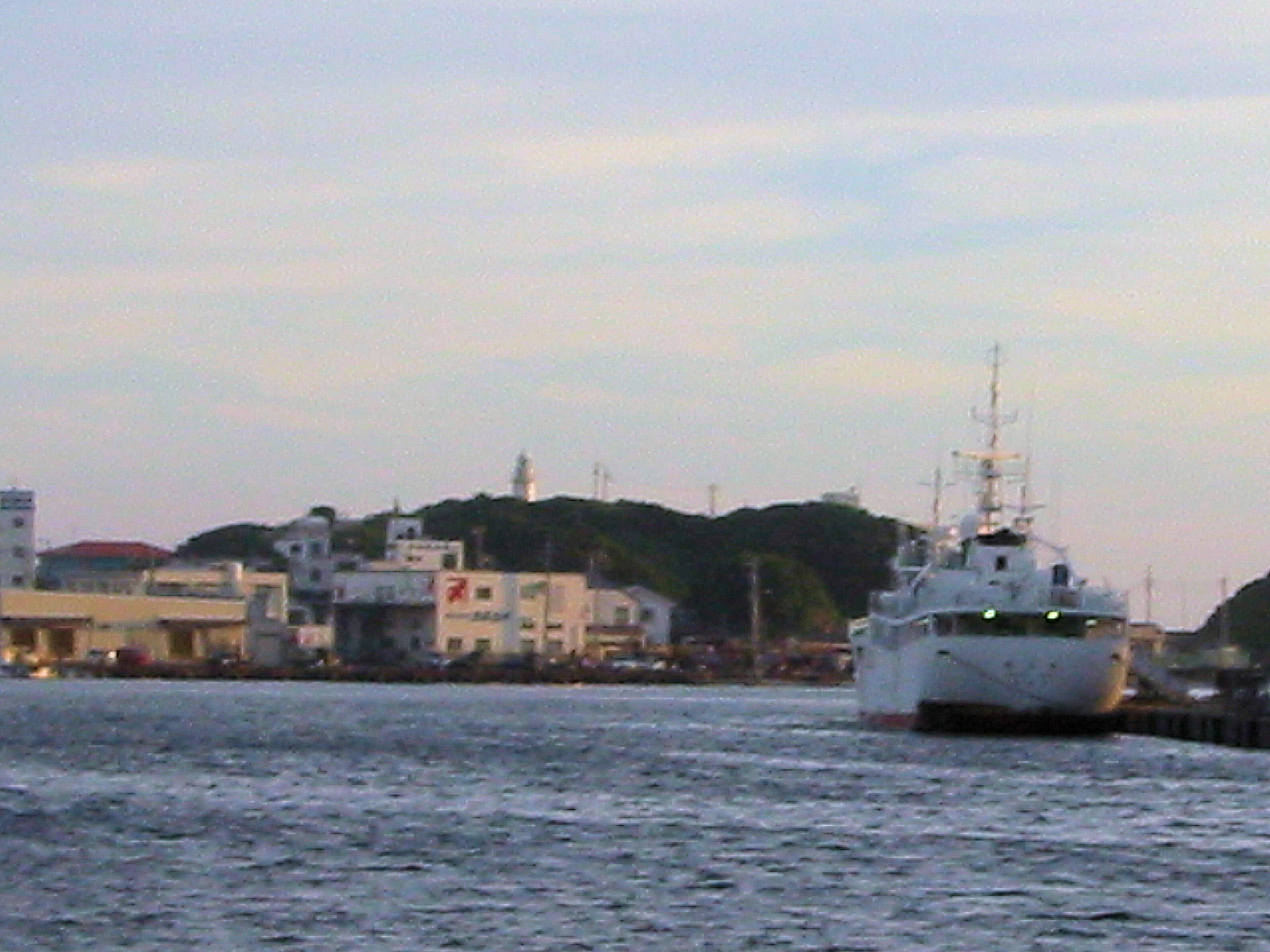
Jōgashima, seen from Misaki harbour.

Jōgashima (城ヶ島, Jōgashima) is an island in the municipality of Miura, Kanagawa Prefecture, Japan, off the southernmost tip of Miura Peninsula, facing Sagami Bay.

It is home to the Jōgashima Lighthouse, the fourth oldest western style lighthouse to be built in Japan. Jōgashima Park is located on the eastern part of the island.

Jōgashima is connected to the mainland by a box-girder bridge since 1959, which was the longest in Asia in 1963.

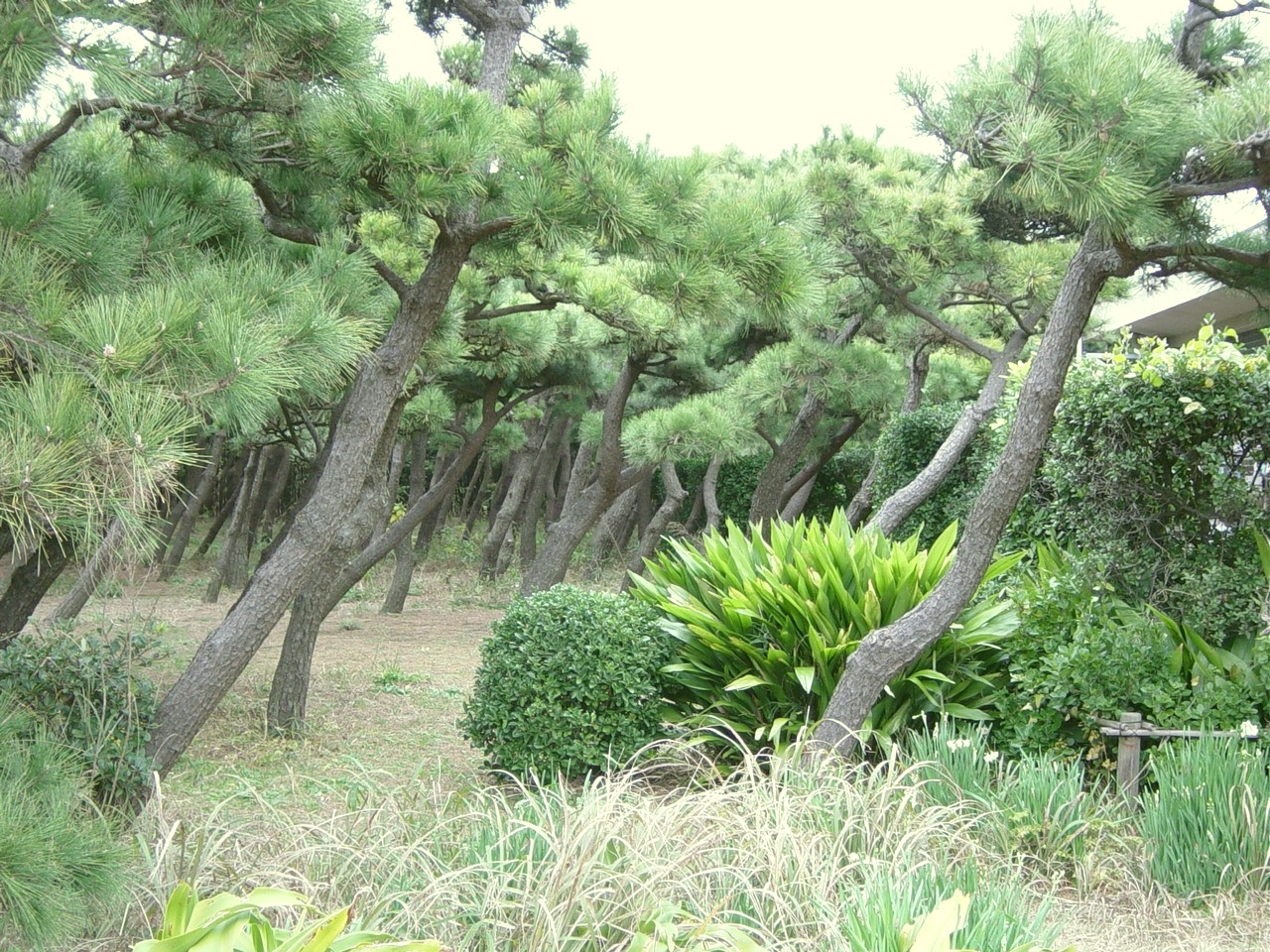
Trees in Jōgashima.

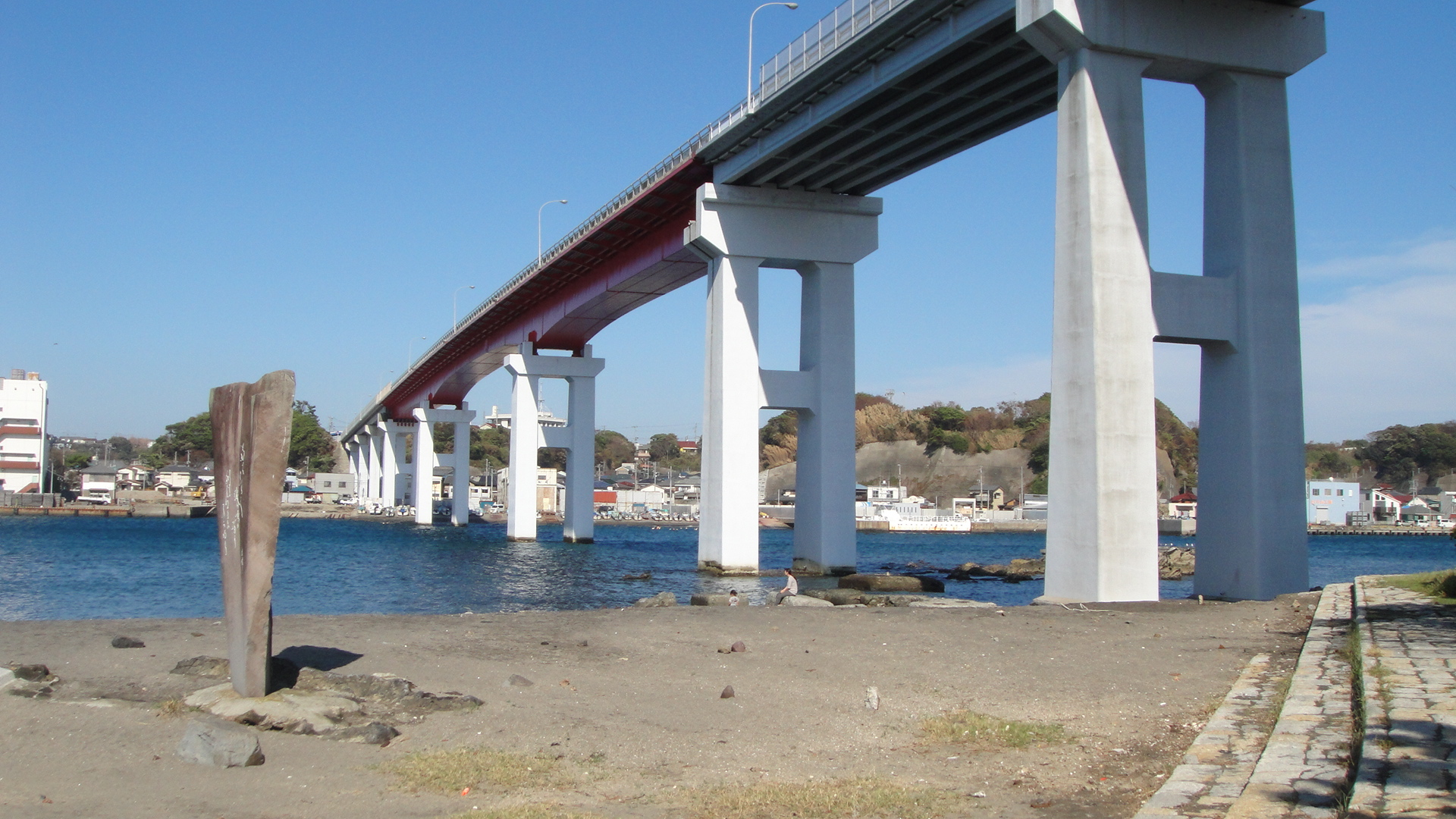
The bridge.

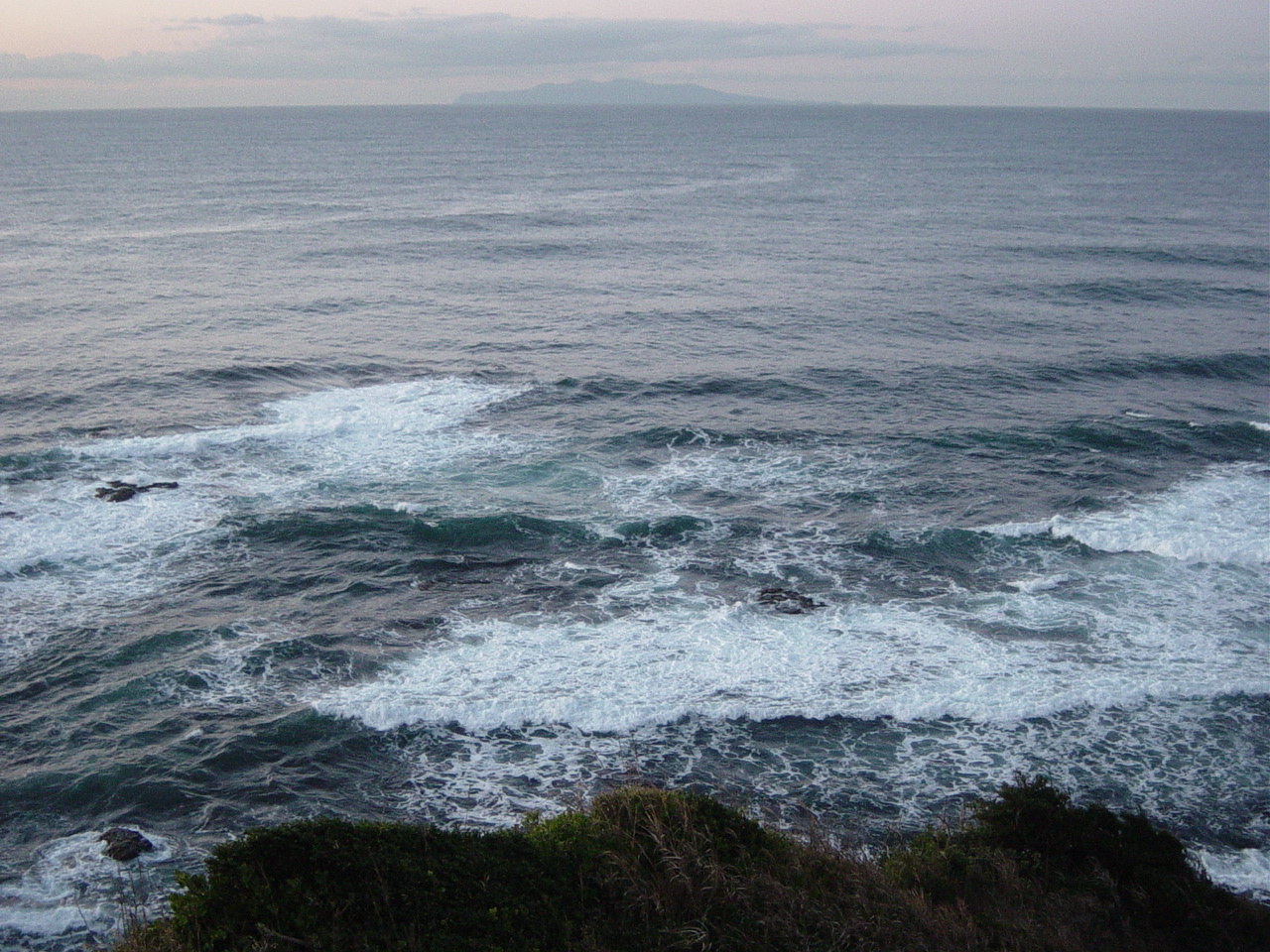
Ōshima from Jōgashima.

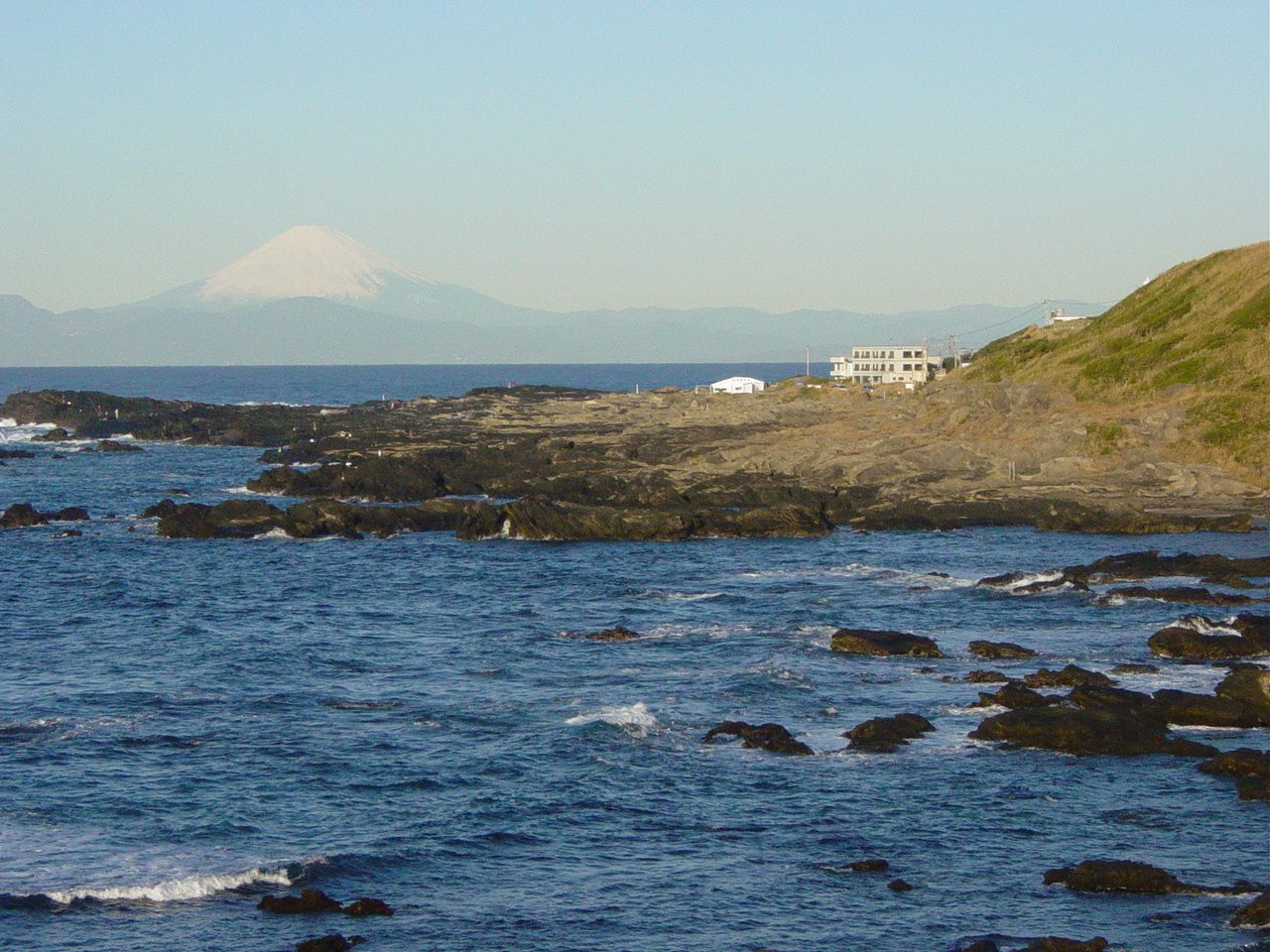
Mount Fuji from Jōgashima.
