= Shinagawa Lighthouse =

Shinagawa Lighthouse 品川灯台
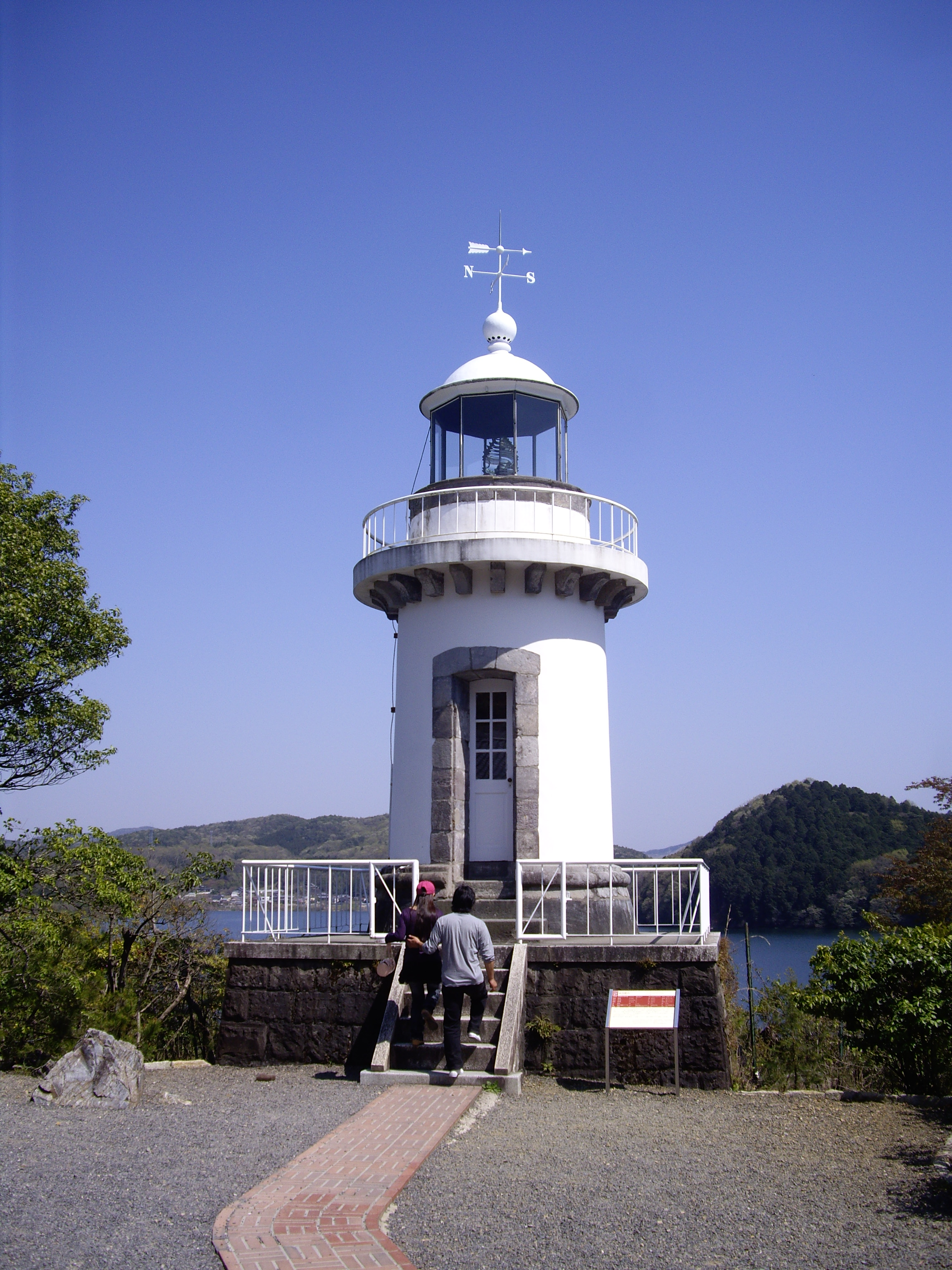
- Shinagawa Lighthouse, now in Meiji Mura.
- Location: Shinagawa, Tokyo (former); Meiji Mura, Inuyama, Aichi Prefecture (current)
- Coordinates: 35°20′29.9″N 136°59′38.9″E

Tower
- Constructed: 5 April 1870
- Construction: brick tower
- Height: 9 metres (30 ft)
- Shape: cylindrical tower with gallery and lantern
- Markings: white tower and lantern
- Heritage: Important Cultural Property

Light
- First lit: 5 March 1870
- Deactivated: 1957
- Focal height: 15.75 m (51.7 ft)
- Lens: 4th order Fresnel lens
- Range: 9 nmi (17 km; 10 mi)
- Characteristic: decorative light

Shinagawa Lighthouse is a lighthouse that was originally located in Shinagawa, Tokyo.

The lighthouse is the third of four lighthouses built by French engineer Léonce Verny, and was operated in Shinagawa until 1957. Following the end of its role in Shinagawa, it was relocated to Meiji Mura, an open-air museum in Inuyama, Aichi Prefecture, where it remains to this day.

Later lighthouses would be built by the English engineer Richard Henry Brunton, until the Japanese would take over lighthouse construction in 1880.

The lighthouse was first lit on 5 March 1870.

== See also ==
- List of lighthouses in Japan
