= Jōgashima Lighthouse =

Jōgashima Lighthouse (城ヶ島灯台)
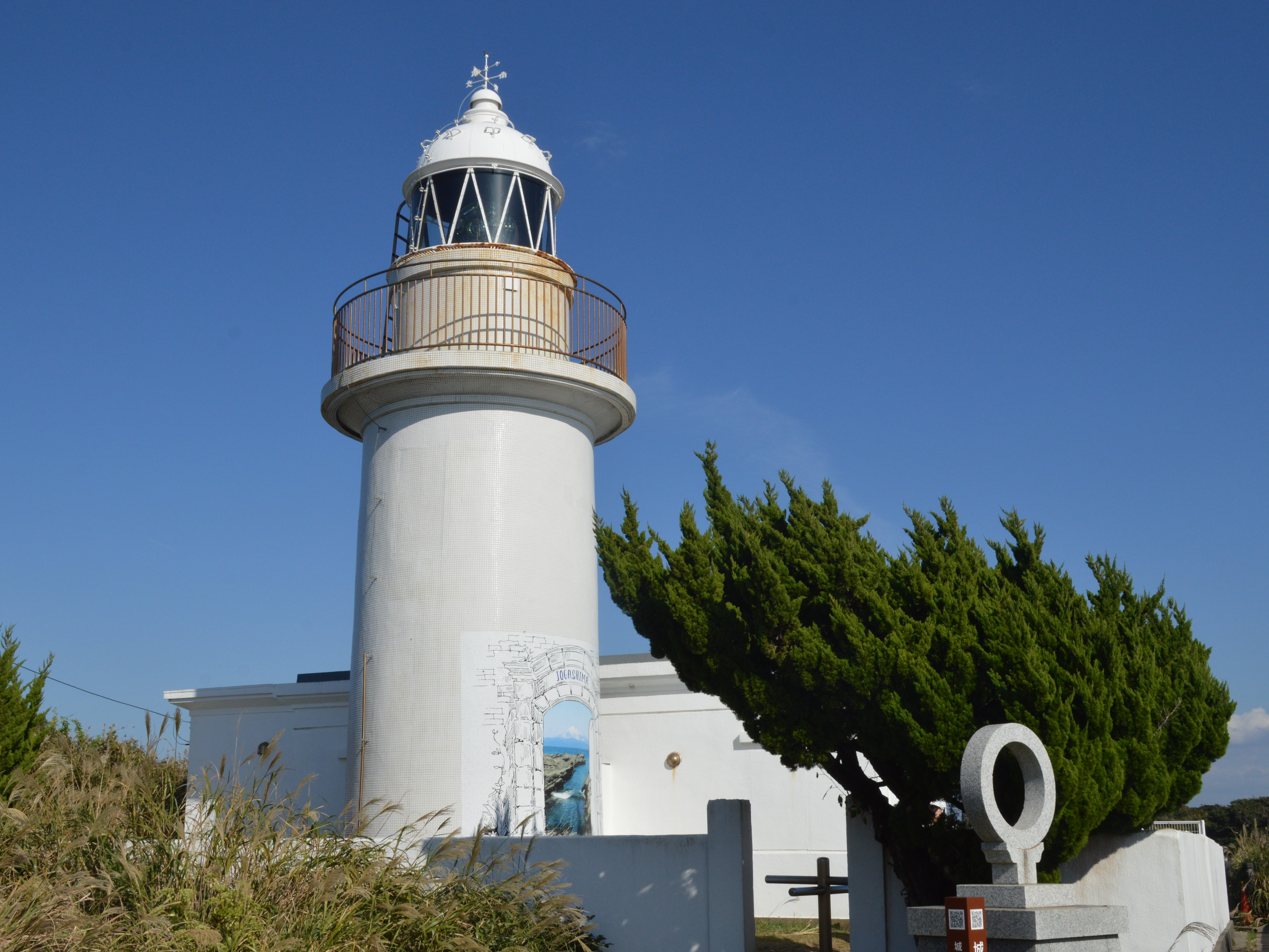
- Jōgashima Lighthouse
- Location: Miura; Kanagawa Prefecture; Japan
- Coordinates: 35°08′06.4″N 139°36′40.1″E

Tower
- Constructed: 1870 (first)
- Foundation: concrete base
- Construction: concrete tower
- Automated: yes
- Height: 11.5 metres (38 ft)
- Shape: cylindrical tower with balcony and lantern
- Markings: white tower and lantern

Light
- First lit: 1925 (current)
- Focal height: 30.1 metres (99 ft)
- Lens: 4th order Fresnel
- Intensity: 400,000 candela
- Range: 16 nautical miles (30 km; 18 mi)
- Characteristic: Fl W 15s
- Japan no.: JCG-2407

Jōgashima Lighthouse (城ヶ島灯台, Jōgashima tōdai) is a lighthouse located on the island of Jōgashima (Japanese: 城ヶ島) in the city of Miura, Kanagawa Prefecture, Japan, off the southernmost and western tip of Miura Peninsula, facing Sagami Bay. It is the fourth oldest western style lighthouse to be built in Japan, and the second oldest surviving to the present day.

== History ==
The Jōgashima Lighthouse was one of eight lighthouses built in Japan under the provisions of the Anglo-Japanese Treaty of Amity and Commerce of 1858, signed by the Bakumatsu period Tokugawa Shogunate. The lighthouse was designed and constructed by expatriate French engineer Léonce Verny. Verny constructed another three lighthouses around Tokyo Bay, and was also the engineer who built the nearby Yokosuka Naval Arsenal during his career in Japan.

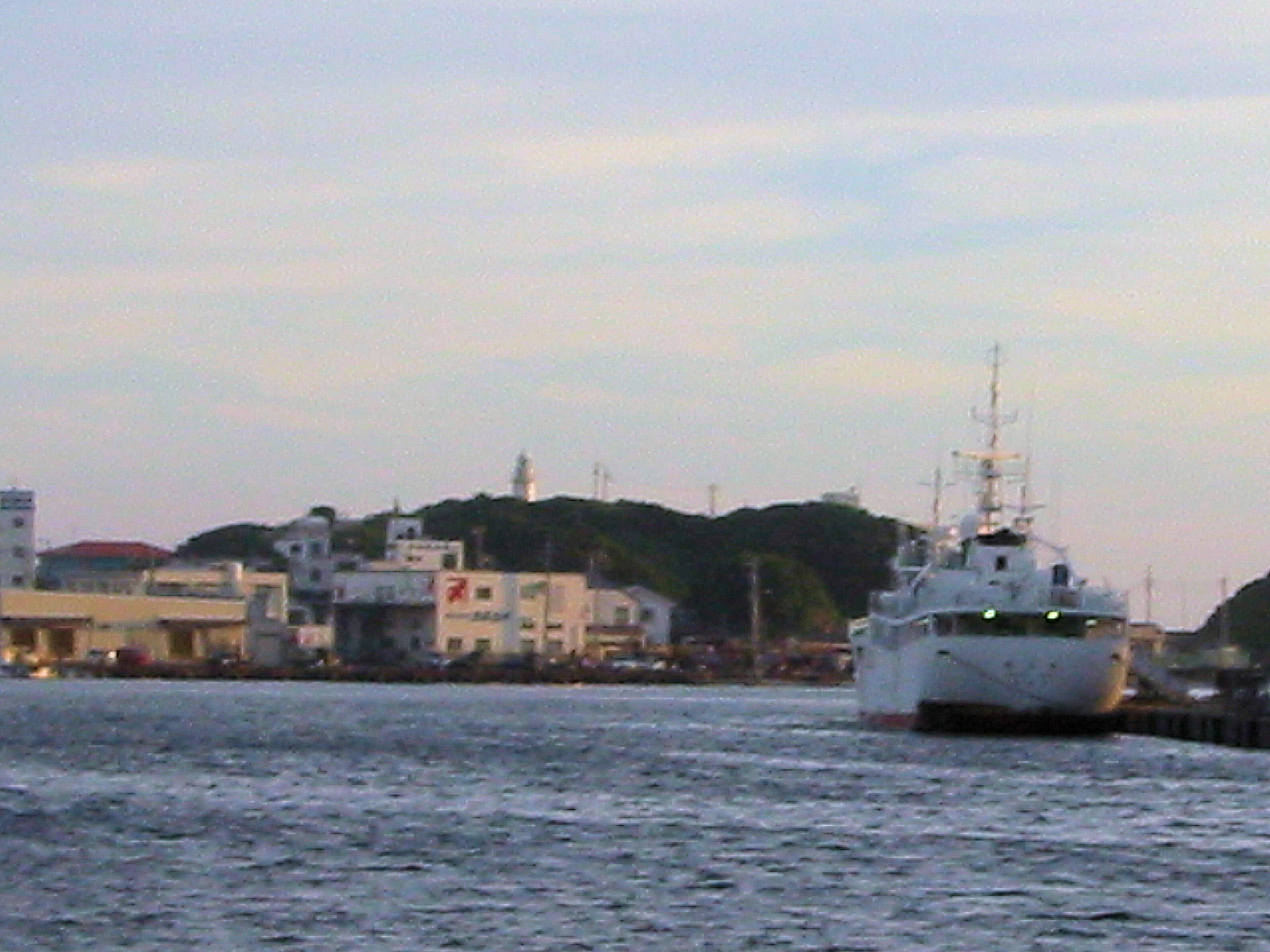
The lighthouse on top of Jōgashima (seen here at the center of the photograph, from Misaki harbour).

The Jōgashima Lighthouse was completed on September 8, 1870, after the Meiji Restoration, and was originally built of brick. The original structure was destroyed during the Great Kantō earthquake on September 1, 1923, and was replaced with the current reinforced-concrete round structure on August 1, 1925. In 1928, its light source was changed from acetylene to electric, greatly increasing its visibility. The lighthouse has been unmanned since 1991. It is currently maintained by the Japan Coast Guard.

== See also ==
- List of lighthouses in Japan
