= Léonce Verny =

French officer and naval engineer

François Léonce Verny
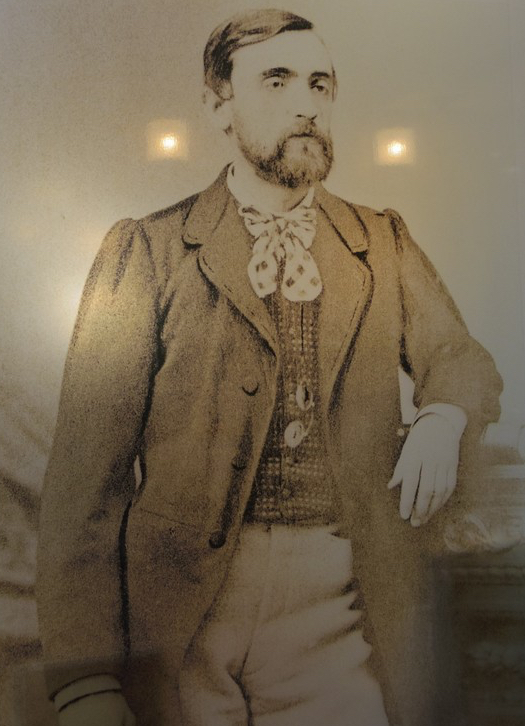
- François Léonce Verny
- Born: 2 December 1837; Pont d'Aubenas, Ardèche, France
- Died: 2 May 1908 (aged 70); Pont d'Aubenas, Ardèche, France
- Other name: Léonce Verny
- Occupations: engineer, foreign advisor to Japan
- Known for: foreign advisor to Meiji Japan

François Léonce Verny (2 December 1837 – 2 May 1908) was a French officer and naval engineer who directed the construction of the Yokosuka Naval Arsenal in Japan, as well as many related modern infrastructure projects from 1865 to 1876, thus helping jump-start Japan's modernization.

== Early life ==
Léonce Verny was born in Aubenas, Ardèche. He studied at Lyon and then went on to the prestigious École Polytechnique in 1856. He entered the Institute for Applied Maritime Science at Cherbourg in 1858, where he became a Naval Engineer. He worked for the French state in the arsenals of Brest and Toulon.

== China mission ==
Verny was sent to Ningbo and Shanghai in China from 1862 to 1864, to supervise the construction of four gunboats for the Chinese Navy, as well as a new shipyard. During that time, he was also French Vice-Consul in Ningbo.

== Career in Japan ==
Japan had started a modernization effort in 1853 and the Tokugawa government decided to build a modern naval shipyard and arsenal in collaboration with the French government. Verny was persuaded to go to Japan by his distant relative, French ambassador Léon Roches in September 1865, who negotiated the substantial annual salary of $10,000. He stayed on after the Meiji Restoration overthrew the Tokugawa government, continuing to work for the new Meiji government for a total of 12 years, returning home to France on 13 March 1876.

=== Yokosuka arsenal ===
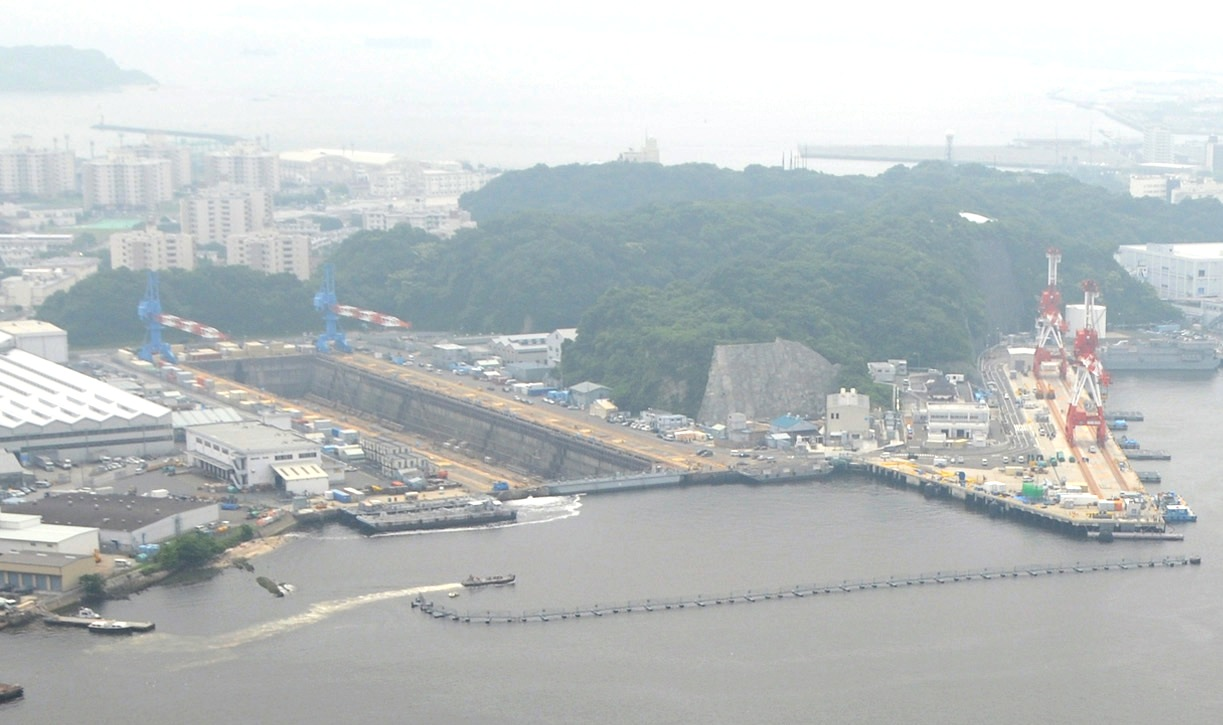
The Verny drydock in Yokosuka, still used today by the US Fleet Activities Yokosuka.

Verny was appointed chief administrator and constructor of the Yokosuka Naval Arsenal in 1865. Yokosuka was chosen because it was a well protected inlet, in close proximity to Yokohama and Tokyo. The same year, he briefly returned to France to purchase all necessary machinery and recruit French naval experts from Brest, Toulon, and Cherbourg (45 families in all) to help organize the construction of the arsenal. During the months in France, Verny also helped in the negotiations for the first French military mission to Japan, consisting of military advisors under Jules Brunet to help train and re-equip the Tokugawa army from 1867, and to assist it in the Boshin War against the Satchō Alliance.

In Yokosuka, Verny trained 65 Japanese technicians and hired 2500 workers. The construction of the shipyard itself was only the central point of a major infrastructure development project, which encompassed foundries, brick kilns, gunpowder and weapons factories, an aqueduct and hydraulic power facilities, modern buildings and technical schools to train Japanese technicians were established.

The Yokosuka Naval Arsenal completed its first warship, the Yokosuka-maru in November 1866, but the planned two repair yards, three shipyards and iron works were not completed by the time of the Meiji Restoration. Initial fears that the pro-Bakufu French engineers would be replaced by British engineers were soon proven groundless, and Yokosuka continued to employ on French engineers until 1878.

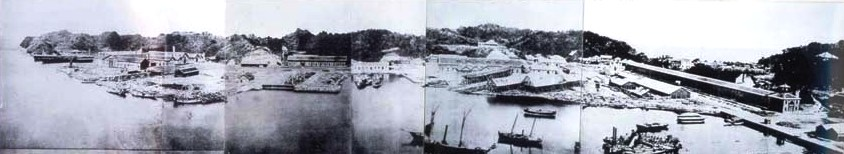
Construction of the Yokosuka arsenal c.1870.

=== Lighthouses ===
In addition to the construction of the Yokosuka Arsenal, Verny also built four lighthouses in the Tokyo area, some of which still exist, such as the Jōgashima Lighthouse, the Kannonzaki Lighthouse and the Nojimazaki Lighthouse. He also built the Shinagawa Lighthouse.

Léonce Verny also managed the building of the shipyard at Nagasaki, the largest in the Far East at that time. In Kobe, he built a metallurgical plant, as well as a patent slip.

Verny experienced numerous problems during his tenure in Japan, as the expectations of the Japanese government and military were very high, but funding was very limited, and Verny had to create much of the necessary infrastructure from scratch. When visited by the French construction director of the Chinese Fuzhou arsenal in 1871, Verny noted that the Chinese budget was three times larger than his.

Verny returned to France in 1876, when the Japanese were able to take full control of the operations.

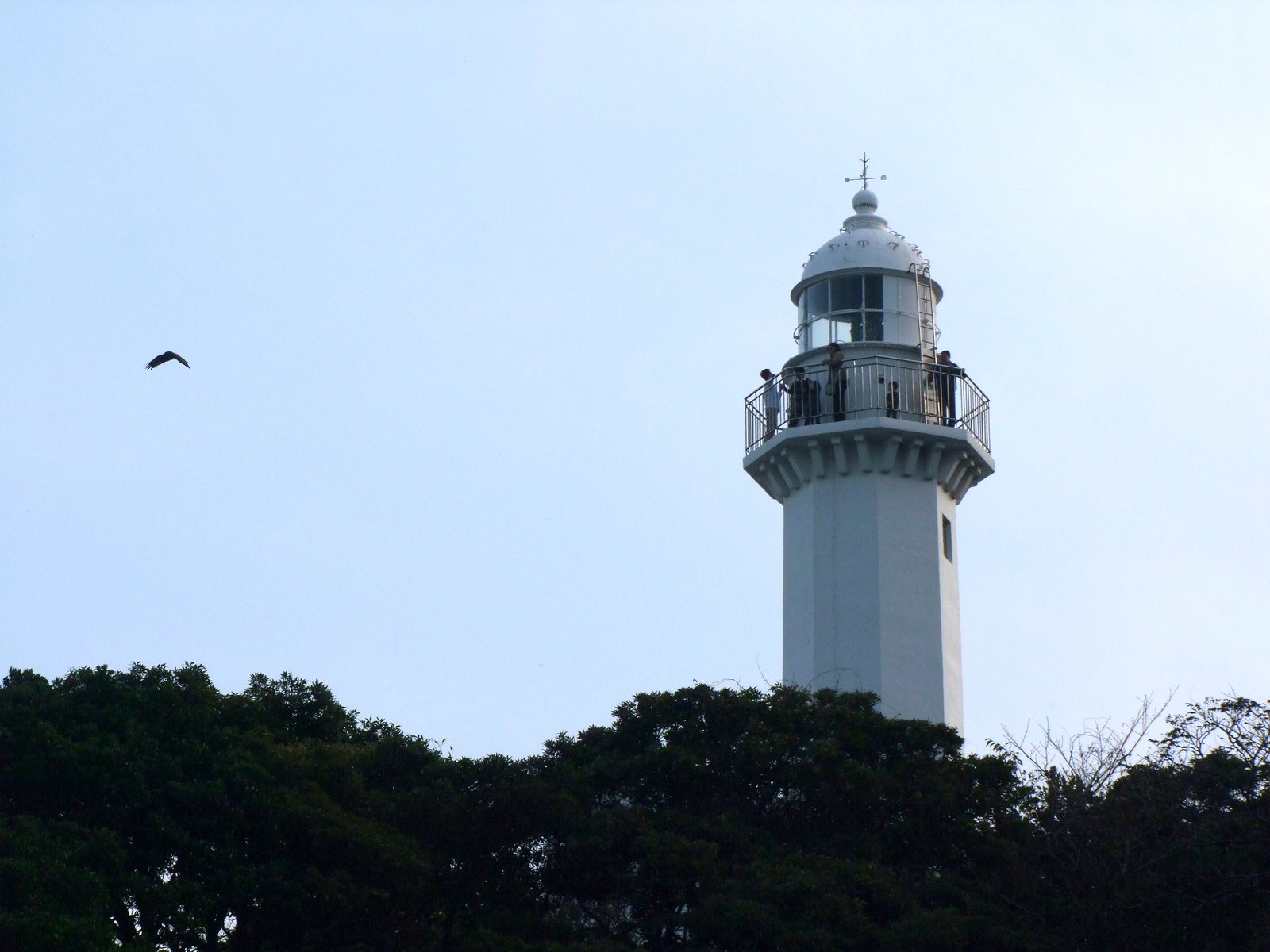
Kannonzaki Lighthouse (Feb 1869)

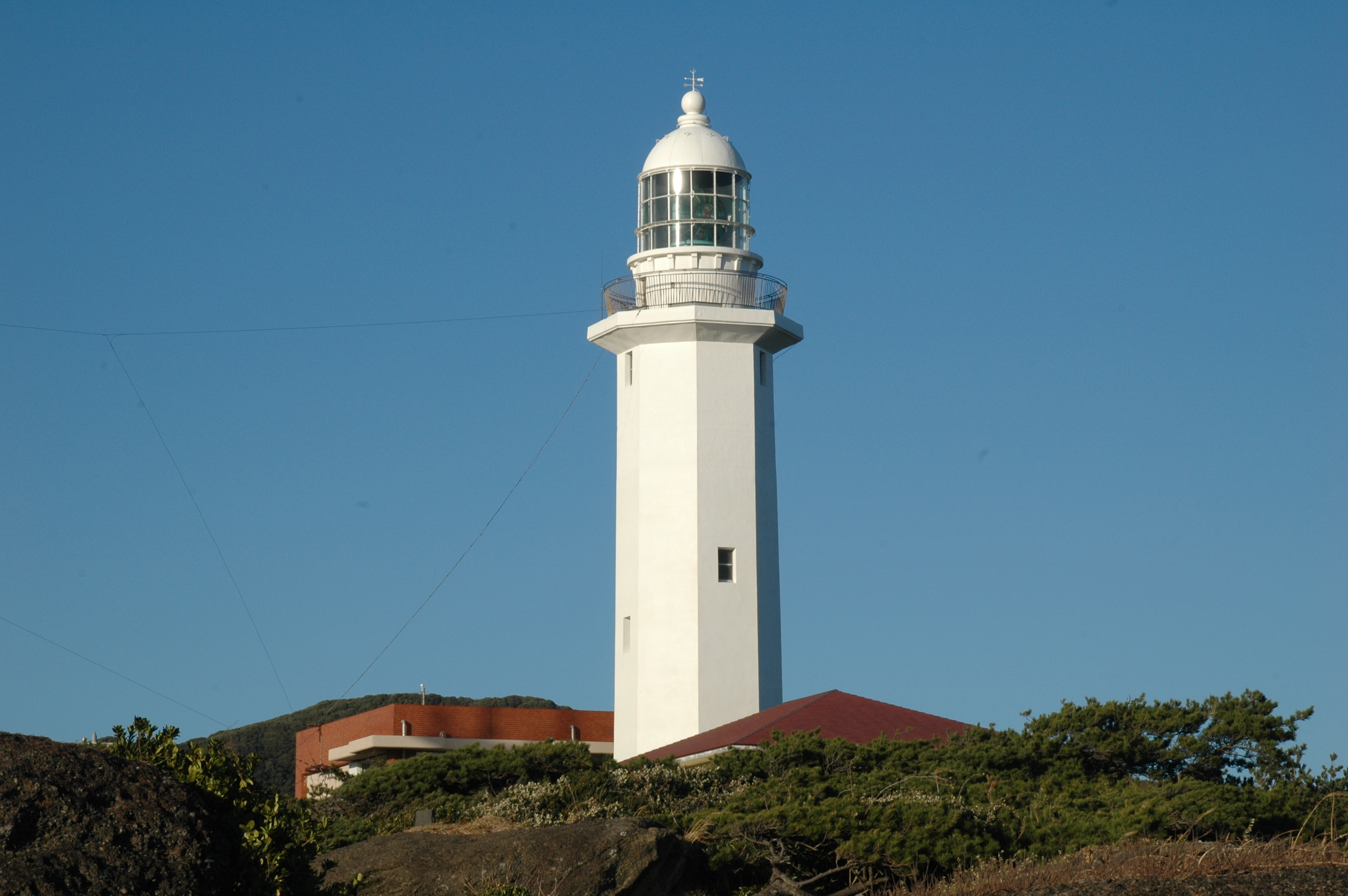
Nojimazaki Lighthouse (Dec 1869)

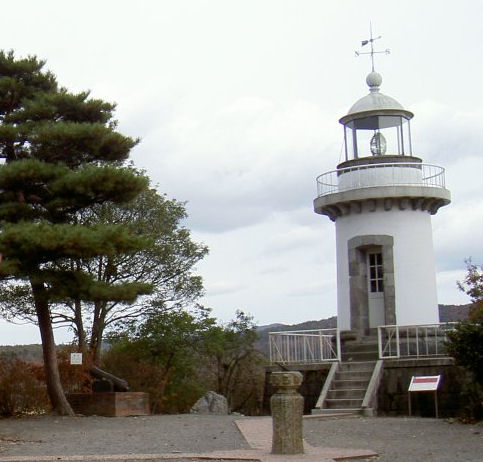
Shinagawa Lighthouse (Mar 1870)

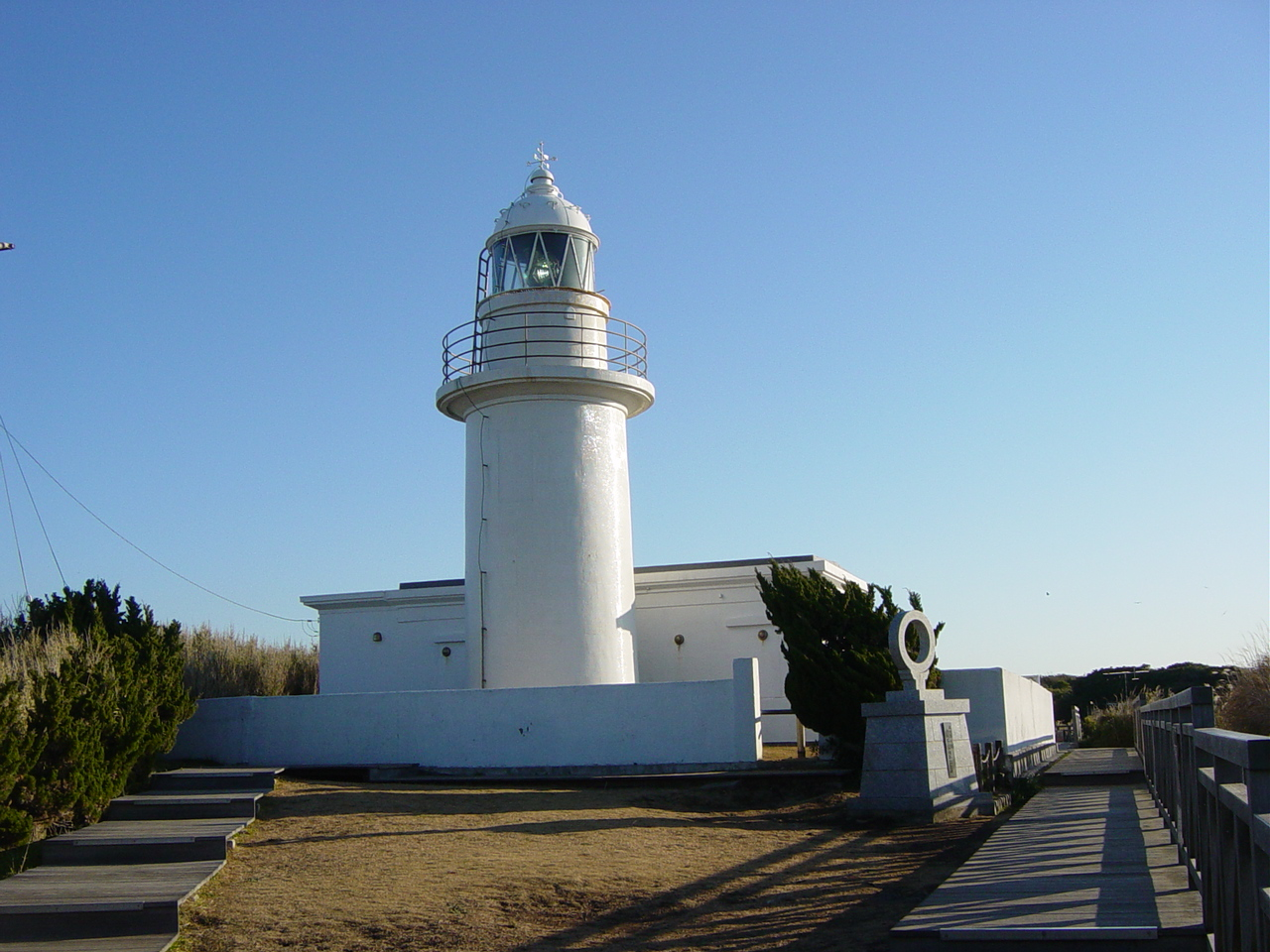
Jōgashima Lighthouse (Sep 1870)

== Later life ==
Upon his return to France, Verny went to work at one of the largest mining companies in France (Compagnie des houllières de Firminy) at Firminy in Roche-la-Molière in January 1877 and rose to the position of director in September 1895. He then served on the Board of Trade of Saint-Étienne (1881–1900) of which he was secretary from 1883 to 1896. He was subsequently awarded the Legion of Honour.

Verny died on 2 May 1908 in his home in Pont d'Aubenas.

== Legacy ==
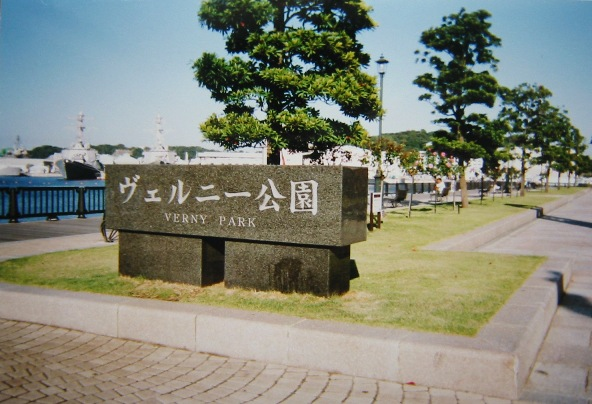
Verny Park, in Yokosuka.

Yokosuka became one of the main arsenals of the Imperial Japanese Navy into the 20th century, in which were built battleships such as Yamashiro, and aircraft carriers such as Hiryū and Shōkaku.

Léonce Verny is remembered in Japan as a symbol of modernization and of friendship with France. A park has been built in his name ("Verny Park") on the seafront at Yokosuka, with a bronze bust of Verny, and a small museum. The Verny Commemorative Museum is located near the site of the former Yokosuka Naval Arsenal.

The dry docks built by Verny are still intact and are currently used by the US Navy as part of the United States Fleet Activities Yokosuka.

== See also ==
- O-yatoi gaikokujin
