= Minoru Kawabata =

American painter

- Born: 22 May 1911; Tokyo, Japan
- Died: 29 June 2001 (aged 90); Tokyo, Japan
- Known for: Painting
- Movement: Abstract expressionism, color field
- Patrons: Betty Parsons

Minoru Kawabata (川端実, Kawabata Minoru; born on May 22, 1911, died on June 29, 2001) was a Japanese artist. Kawabata is best known for his color field paintings. Between 1960 and 1981, Kawabata had 11 solo shows at the prominent Betty Parsons Gallery in New York. At the 31st Venice Biennale in 1962, Kawabata’s work was exhibited in the Japan Pavilion alongside that of four other Japanese artists. Kawabata has had solo exhibitions at the Everson Museum of Art in 1974, the Museum of Modern Art, Kamakura in 1975, the National Museum of Modern Art, Kyoto and Ohara Museum of Art in 1992, and Yokosuka Museum of Art in 2011. Kawabata’s works are in the collection of the Albright-Knox Art Gallery, Artizon Museum, Everson Museum of Art, Museum of Contemporary Art Tokyo, the Museum of Modern Art, Kamakura & Hayama, the Museum of Modern Art, São Paulo, the National Museum of Art, Osaka, the National Museum of Modern Art, Kyoto, the National Museum of Modern Art, Tokyo, the Newark Museum of Art, Ohara Museum of Art, Solomon R. Guggenheim Museum, Yokohama Museum of Art, Yokosuka Museum of Art, among others.

== Biography ==
=== Early life and education (1911–1941) ===
Kawabata was born on March 22, 1911, in Kasuga-chō, Koishikawa Ward, Tokyo. His father, Moshō Kawabata, was a Japanese-style painter and his grandfather, Gyokushō Kawabata, was a master painter of the Maruyama School. Despite his family's history of working in Japanese-style media, in April 1929, he enrolled in the oil painting department of the Tokyo School of Fine Arts, where he studied under Takeji Fujishima. One of Kawabata’s classmates was Taro Okamoto, but he left for France in the third term of his first year. Kawabata graduated from the Tokyo School of Fine Arts in 1934, his work was selected for the Bunten exhibition in 1936, and in 1939 he became a Kōfūkai (光風会) member. In August of the same year, he left for Europe. Soon after his arrival in Paris he was ordered to leave the country due to the outbreak of World War II. Initially he fled to New York, but after few months, Kawabata returned to France again. He then moved to Italy due to the escalation of the war, but when Italy also joined World War II he returned to Japan in September 1941.

=== War painting (1941–1945) ===
Shortly after Kawabata's return from Europe, Japan was plunged into the Pacific War. Like many other artists, Kawabata was involved in producing war paintings. Kawabata’s war paintings were exhibited at the 1st Greater East Asian War Art Exhibition (大東亜戦争美術展) in 1942 and the 1st Army Art Exhibition (陸軍美術展) in 1943. Several of Kawabata’s war paintings are in the collection of the National Museum of Modern Art, Tokyo on indefinite loan from the United States.

=== Postwar Japan (1945–1958) ===
After the war, from 1950 to 1955, Kawabata became a professor at Tama Art University, Tokyo, and during this time participated in the formation of an art group known as the New Creation Society (Shinseisaku Kyōkai; 新制作協会). In 1951, he was selected to represent Japan at the inaugural São Paulo Biennale. In 1953, together with Saburo Hasegawa, Jiro Yoshihara, Takeo Yamaguchi and others, Kawabata formed the Japan Abstract Art Club (日本アブストラクト・アート・クラブ). ln the 1950s he began to move away from figurative representation and to search for dynamic, abstract expression.

=== American years (1958–1994) ===
In September 1958, Kawabata moved to the US and settled in New York, and the following month his Rhythm Brown (1958) received Honorable Mention at the 2nd Guggenheim International Award. In 1959, Kawabata was appointed as a professor at the New School for Social Research in New York. Kawabata held his first New York solo show at the Betty Parsons Gallery in 1960, forming an association which has continued ever since, with almost yearly exhibitions of his work. At the 31st Venice Biennale in 1962, Kawabata exhibited his works at the Japan Pavilion (commissioner: Atsuo Imaizumi) alongside that of four other artists (Kinuko Emi, Kumi Sugai, Tadashi Sugimata, and Ryōkichi Mukai). At the Venice Biennale, Kawabata exhibited eight works, including Vivid Red (1961), which is characterised by calligraphic brushwork and intense colours. Through the limited colour contrast of red and white, Vivid Red marked the completion of Kawabata's abstraction with powerful strokes. In the 1950s, Kawabata’s work was influenced by Abstract Expressionism that swept the New York art scene at that time, but from the end of the 1960s his work developed into abstract paintings that emphasised colour fields and hard-edge geometric forms. Through the 1970s, Kawabata pursued abstraction, in which colour fields overlap in clear and simplified forms, such as diamonds, ellipses and origami-like shapes. The exhibition catalogue of his retrospective, held at the Everson Museum of Art in New York in 1974, interpreted: "Kawabata has consistently sought and won a powerfully individual mode of expression with lyrical color forms in space."

=== Later years (1994–2001) ===
Kawabata had a large-scale touring retrospective at the National Museum of Modern Art, Kyoto and the Ohara Museum of Art in 1992, and returned to Japan in 1994, resettling in Tokyo. He died in a hospital in Shibuya Ward, Tokyo, on June 29, 2001, at the age of 90.

== Selected exhibitions ==
=== Solo exhibitions ===
- 1942 Ginza Mitsukoshi Department Store, Tokyo
- 1949 Hokusō Gallery (北荘画廊), Tokyo
- 1950 Hokusō Gallery, Tokyo
- 1951 Shiseidō Gallery (資生堂ギャラリー), Tokyo
- 1952 Takemiya Gallery (タケミヤ画廊), Tokyo
- 1954 Shiseidō Gallery, Tokyo
- 1956 Matsuya Ginza Department Store, Tokyo
- 1956 Fūgetsudō (風月堂), Tokyo
- 1958 Matsuya Ginza Department Store, Tokyo
- 1960 Betty Parsons Gallery, New York
- 1961 Galleria Apollinaire, Milan
- 1961 Betty Parsons Gallery, New York
- 1963 Betty Parsons Gallery, New York
- 1963 Tokyo Gallery (東京画廊), Tokyo
- 1965 Betty Parsons Gallery, New York
- 1967 Betty Parsons Gallery, New York
- 1969 Betty Parsons Gallery, New York
- 1971 Betty Parsons Gallery, New York
- 1972 Westbeth Courtyard Gallery, New York
- 1974 Everson Museum of Art, New York
- 1974 Betty Parsons Gallery, New York
- 1975 Minoru Kawabata (川端実展), The Museum of Modern Art, Kamakura
- 1977 Betty Parsons Gallery, New York
- 1978 Tokyo Gallery, Tokyo
- 1979 Root Gallery (ルートギャラリー), Tokyo
- 1980 Betty Parsons Gallery, New York
- 1981 Betty Parsons Gallery, New York
- 1983 Tokyo Gallery, Tokyo
- 1983 Jack Tilton Gallery, New York
- 1984 Jack Tilton Gallery, New York
- 1985 Jack Tilton Gallery, New York
- 1988 Jack Tilton Gallery, New York
- 1988 Virginia Miller Galleries, Florida
- 1989 Tokyo Gallery, Tokyo
- 1990 Jack Tilton Gallery, New York
- 1992 Minoru Kawabata (在米35年 孤高の軌跡: 川端実展), The National Museum of Modern Art, Kyoto and Ohara Museum of Art, Kurashiki
- 1994 Jack Tilton Gallery, New York
- 1997 Tokyo Gallery, Tokyo
- 2011 Minoru Kawabata (生誕100年 川端実展: 東京—ニューヨーク), Yokosuka Museum of Art
- 2020 Minoru Kawabata Form Fullness – From 35 Years of Work in New York (川端実 Form Fullness ― 在ニューヨーク35年の仕事から), Shibuya Hikarie 8/ (渋谷ヒカリエ8/), Tokyo

=== Group exhibitions ===
- 1933 20th Kōfkūai Exhibition (光風会展)
- 1933 14th Teiten (帝展)
- 1938 2nd Bunten (文展)
- 1941 4th Shinbunten (新文展)
- 1942 1st Greater East Asian War Art Exhibition (大東亜戦争美術展), Tokyo Metropolitan Art Museum
- 1943 1st Army Art Exhibition (陸軍美術展), Toyo Metropolitan Art Museum
- 1951 Contemporary French Art Exhibition (現代フランス美術展), Nihonbashi Takashimaya Department Store, Tokyo
- 1951 3rd Japan Independent Exhibition (アンデパンダン展), Toyo Metropolitan Art Museum
- 1951 1st São Paulo Biennale
- 1952 Salon de Mai, Paris
- 1952 1st International Art Exhibition of Japan (日本国際美術展), Tokyo
- 1954 1st Contemporary Art Exhibition of Japan (現代日本美術展), Tokyo
- 1955 International Watercolor Exhibition: 18th Biennial, Brooklyn Museum
- 1956 Exposition Internationale de l’Art Actuel (世界・今日の美術展), Nihonbashi Takashimaya Department Story, Tokyo
- 1957 4th São Paulo Biennale
- 1958 Development of Modern Japanese Abstract Painting (抽象絵画の展開), The National Museum of Modern Art, Tokyo
- 1958 2nd Guggenheim International Award
- 1958 41st Pittsburgh International Exhibition of Contemporary Painting and Sculpture
- 1959 5th São Paulo Biennale
- 1959 XI Premio Lissone Internazionale per la Pittura, Lissone
- 1960 Six Japanese Painters, Gres Gallery, Washington, D.C.
- 1961 Carnegie International
- 1961 XII Premio Lissone Internazionale per la Pittura, Lissone
- 1962 Four American Painters, Molton Gallery, London
- 1962 Contemporary Painting Exhibition, Yale University Art Gallery, New Haven
- 1962 7th International Annual, University of Virginia, Mary Washington College
- 1962 31st Venice Biennale
- 1963 New Experiment in Art, deCordva Sculpture Park and Museum
- 1964 Oriental, Baltimore Museum of Art
- 1964 Carnegie International
- 1965 Exhibition of Japanese Artists Abroad: Europe and America (在外日本作家展: ヨーロッパとアメリカ), The National Museum of Modern Art, Tokyo
- 1965 The New Japanese Painting and Sculpture, San Francisco Museum of Modern Art and The Museum of Modern Art, New York
- 1967 Carnegie International
- 1969 Contemporary Painting and Sculpture, Bristol Art Museum, Rhode Islands
- 1973 Japanese Artist in the America (アメリカの日本作家), The National Museum of Modern Art, Tokyo and The National Museum of Modern Art, Kyoto
- 1973 Source of Inspiration, Betty Parsons Gallery, New York
- 1975 Large Works, Betty Parsons Gallery, New York
- 1980 Katachi: Form and Spirit in Japanese Art, Albuquerque Museum of Art and History, New Mexico
- 1981 1950s: Darkness and Light (1950年代: その暗黒と光芒), Tokyo Metropolitan Art Museum
- 1982 Betty Parsons Gallery, New York
- 1983 Tokyo Gallery in London: Juda Rowan Gallery’s Selection from Tokyo Gallery: Minoru Kawabata, Lee U-fan, Yoshishige Saito, Juda Rowan Gallery, London
- 1983 1960s: Departure for Diversification (1960年代: 多様化への出発), Tokyo Metropolitan Art Museum
- 1984 Twenty Years of Contemporary Paintings (現代絵画の20年), The Museum of Modern Art, Gunma
- 1985 Human Documents ’84/’85 (ヒューマン・ドキュメンツ ’84/’85), Tokyo Gallery
- 1988 42nd Western New York Exhibition, Albright-Knox Art Gallery, Buffalo
- 1990 Tokyo Avant-garde Forest 1946–1956 (東京アヴァンギャルドの森 1946–1956), Itabashi Art Museum, Tokyo
- 1992 Calligraphy and Painting, the Passionate Age: 1945-1969 (書と絵画の熱き時代: 1945－1969), O Art Museum (品川文化振興事業団O美術館), Tokyo
- 1994－1995 Japanese Art After 1945: Scream Against the Sky, Yokohama Museum of Art, Guggenheim Museum SoHo, and San Francisco Museum of Modern Art
- 1996 1964: A Turning Point in Japanese Art (日本の美術: よみがえる1964年), Museum of Contemporary Art Tokyo
- 1997 The World in Transition: Painting in Japan since 1945 (変貌する世界: 日本の現代絵画1945年以後), Takaoka Art Museum, Toyama and Yonago City Museum of Art, Tottori
- 2001 Through a Collector’s Eye: Japanese Art after 1945 (あるコレクターがみた戦後日本美術), The Museum of Modern Art, Gunma and The Museum of Art, Ehime
- 2002 Write Painting: Marks in Japanese Vein (日本的なもの: 書くこと描くこと), The Museum of Fine Arts, Gifu
- 2010 1960s Revisited, David Richard Contemporary, Santa Fe
- 2020 Powers of Painting: Selection from the Ohashi Collection (熱い絵画: 大橋コレクションに見る戦後日本美術の力), Nara Prefectural Museum of Art

== Major public collections ==
- Albright-Knox Art Gallery, Baffalo
- Artizon Museum, Tokyo
- Chiba City Museum of Art
- Elder Gallery, Wesleyan University, Middletown
- Everson Museum of Art, New York
- Itabashi Art Museum, Tokyo
- Kure Municipal Museum of Art
- Museo d'Arte Contemporanea di Lissone
- Museum of Contemporary Art Tokyo
- The Museum of Fine Arts, Gifu
- The Museum of Modern Art, Kamakura & Hayama
- Museum of Modern Art, São Paulo
- The National Museum of Art, Osaka
- The National Museum of Modern Art, Kyoto
- The National Museum of Modern Art, Tokyo
- The Newark Museum of Art, New Jersey
- Ohara Museum of Art, Kurashiki
- Solomon R. Guggenheim Museum, New York
- Takamatsu Art Museum
- Tama Art University Museum, Tokyo
- The University Art Museum, Tokyo University of the Arts
- Yokohama Museum of Art
- Yokosuka Museum of Art
