= Kinuko Emi =

Japanese painter

- 江見 絹子
- Born: June 7, 1923; Akashi, Hyōgo Prefecture, Japan
- Died: January 13, 2015 (aged 91); Yokohama, Kanagawa Prefecture, Japan
- Other name: Emi Kinuko (江見絹子)
- Occupations: painter, visual artist
- Years active: 1949–2010
- Movement: Abstract expressionism, Informalism, Color field
- Children: Anna Ogino

Kinuko Emi (江見絹子, Emi Kinuko; born Ogino Kinuko, 荻野絹子, on June 7, 1923, died on January 13, 2015) was a Japanese painter. Emi is best known for her abstract painting in bold colors featuring the motif of four classical elements (fire, air, water, and earth). At the 31st Venice Biennale in 1962, Emi's work was exhibited in the Japan Pavilion alongside that of four male artists, making her the first Japanese woman artist to be shown at the country's Pavilion. She had retrospective exhibitions at the Yokohama Civic Art Gallery in 1996, the Museum of Modern Art, Kamakura in 2004 and Himeji City Museum of Art in 2010. Emi's works are in the collection of the National Museum of Art, Osaka, the Museum of Contemporary Art Tokyo, the Museum of Modern Art, Kamakura & Hayama, Yokohama Museum of Art, and Takamatsu Art Museum, among others. Emi's daughter, Anna Ogino, is an Akutagawa Prize-winning novelist and emeritus professor of French literature at Keio University, Tokyo, who serves as the custodian of her mother's works and legacy.

== Biography ==
=== Early life and education (1923–1950) ===
Emi was born on June 7, 1923, in Akashi, Hyōgo Prefecture. Emi graduated from Hyogo Prefectural Kakogawa Women's Higher School (兵庫県立加古川高等女学校) in 1940. She was a member of the painting club at the school. From 1941 to 1943, Emi studied under Hiroshi Ikawa (伊川寛), a Western-style oil painter who later became a member of the Second Era Society (Niki-kai; 二紀会), and from 1945 to 1949, she studied at the Kobe Municipal Western Painting Institute (神戸市立洋画研究所). At the time, Western-style painting was not considered a woman's career and Emi's father strongly opposed his daughter's decision to pursue oil painting after graduation. From 1948 to 1950, Emi worked as a drawing teacher at Kobe Municipal Ota Junior High School (神戸市立太田中学校).

=== Early career (1950–1953) ===
In her early career, Emi actively exhibited her works at the annual juried salon hosted by the Kōdō Bijutsu Association (行動美術協会; literally "Action Art Society"). With her figurative female nudes, she quickly moved up the membership ladder of Kōdō Bijutsu. In 1948, after her work was accepted for the first time at Kōdō's 4th exhibition, she moved from Kobe to Yokohama. From 1950 onward, her works were regularly accepted to Kōdō's annual exhibitions; she was awarded the Encouragement Prize (奨励賞) at the 5th exhibition in 1950, followed by the Newcomer's Prize (新人賞) at the 6th exhibition in 1951. At the 7th exhibition in 1952, Emi exhibited Crowd (2) (むれ(2)) that depicted a group of figurative nude women in dark colours, and won the highest prize, Kōdō Bijutsu Prize (行動美術賞). In 1953, with these achievements, Emi was made Kōdō's first woman member at the 8th exhibition, where she exhibited another female nude, Three Standing Women (三立婦). Meanwhile, in 1952, her work was accepted to the annual salon of the Women Artists Association (Joryū Gaka Kyōkai; 女流画家協会), which led to her membership in the association.

=== International travels (1953–1955) ===
Emi traveled to the US in November 1953 and held a solo exhibition, Emi Kinuko Gaillard, at the Sausalito Arts Center in Sausalito, California, in February 1954, showing works such as Crowd (2). Emi later traveled to New York and then to Paris, where she stayed until August 1955. In Paris, Emi frequented the Louvre Museum and she "was astonished by the evidently long tradition of concrete expression in European painting, especially in regard to the nude." Emi was also exposed to contemporary abstract paintings, such as American Abstract Expressionism and French Art Informel or Tachisme. In 1954, when Emi traveled to Southern Europe, she was shocked to see the prehistoric cave paintings of Lascaux and Altamira, which led her to reconsider what art is. These visits prompted a great shift in her practice to semi-abstraction, in which the subject is captured in a simplified form. Emi returned to Japan in the fall of 1955.

=== Success as an abstract painter (1956–1967) ===
After returning to Japan, Emi received greater visibility and opportunities as an abstract painter. Masao Momiya, curator of the Museum of Modern Art, Kamakura & Hayama pointed out: "Certainly [Art Informel and Abstract Expressionism] were much admired during this period. Nevertheless, the development of [Emi’s] abstract painting does not readily indicate her debt to such movements but, rather, speaks to the personal efforts made by a painter who continued to change course in pursuit of a unique mode of expression." Indeed, Emi refused to follow what the critics of the time were appreciating. In 1958, Ichirō Haryū, one of the most influential "Big Three" critics of postwar Japan, visited Emi's solo show and described her Symbol (象徴) as follows: "Expressive elements are restrained, and an architectural structure consisting of colored rectangular planes and lines is outstanding. Nevertheless, a method of painting powerfully with the palette knife has been intensified and, in conjunction with a collage-like structure, strongly evokes a feeling for materials. This result in a space filled with energy. This particular work consists of two adjoining canvases, and the painter has thoughtfully considered the contrast and balance of left and right." Despite such applause by the influential male critic, Emi "subsequently reversed the two canvases that comprise Symbol and incorporated space between them when they were shown in the Second Shell Art Award Exhibition of 1958." Emi won the third prize for her Symbol at the Second Shell Art Award Exhibition (present Idemitsu Art Award), held at the Museum of Modern Art, Kamakura in 1958. She also participated in the 41st Pittsburgh International Exhibition of Contemporary Painting and Sculpture in 1958 and the 3rd Guggenheim International Award in 1960. At the 31st Venice Biennale in 1962, Emi became the first Japanese female artist to exhibit at the Japan Pavilion (commissioner: Atsuo Imaizumi). Although her work was shown alongside four male artists—Minoru Kawabata, Kumi Sugai, Tadashi Sugimata, and Ryōkichi Mukai—her presence was far ahead of its time. The second woman, after Emi, to represent Japan at the Venice Biennale was Yayoi Kusama in 1993, notably also the first Japanese woman artist to hold solo show at the country's Pavilion. Emi developed a variety of original painting techniques over her career. In her Work (作品) series shown at the Venice Biennale, for example, Emi invented a unique creative process described as follows: “first, the paint layer is removed from the old paintings by dipping them into the water of a pond; second, the collected paint is dried, ground, and sifted; third the paint particles are mixed with turpentine, left for several days, and then colored by fresh paints such as yellow ochre; fourth, the ground for the new painting is made from the colored mixture applied to a fresh canvas; and fifth, Paynes gray mixed with transparent medium is diluted with turpentine, and then sprinkled over the prepared ground for finishing the work.”

=== Return to figuration (1967–1974) ===
After the Venice Biennale, Emi occasionally returned to figurative expression. According to Masao Momiya, "the period from 1967 to 1974, during which she made conceptual works and realistic, or illusionistic works—sometimes in the form of shaped canvases—was a difficult time of trial and error." Her return to figuration was partly informed by the rise and fall of materialistic civilization in the 1970s such as the Expo '70 and the Vietnam War.

=== Four classical elements in abstraction (1975–1986) ===
After the trial and error period, Emi returned to abstraction with brighter colors, and from 1975 to 1986, she "purposely incorporated natural actions in her production by employing the 'dissolving' technique to the overall canvas, and she succeeded in expressing her own view of the cosmos." For instance, Emi often "adopted the technique of running turpentine, or paints diluted with turpentine, down the inclined canvas, or dissolving paints with turpentine and then spreading them on the canvas. […] natural actions such as the mixture and the dissolution of substance and the forces of gravity are introduced to her production as unexpected elements." In 1980, Emi said, “My principal motifs consist of four elements, water, fire, solid, and wind. I am aiming at having a cosmic space appear as an integrating factor among these elements, and I will do so.” Moreover, in 1981 Emi unveiled a series of geometric abstract paintings, bearing titles borrowed from the Rubáiyát, the collected poems of Omar Khayyam, the eleventh and twelfth centuries Persian poet. In the early 1980s, the four elements and the geometric forms appear repeatedly in Emi's paintings.

=== Later years (1987–2015) ===
Masao Momiya pointed out: "Since 1987, the 'dissolving' technique that [Emi] had originally applied to the overall canvas has been gradually curtailed to become only one of a number of productive means of the painter. In other words, while unexpected elements of nature, such as the mixture and the dissolution of substances and the forces of gravity have been restrained, the painter's own hand creates overall painting again. In addition, to the 'dissolving' technique, the artist's mixing of wet paints on the canvas, as well as her coaxing of a visual, or optical mixing of the color of the upper paint layer with that of the lower by virtue of their juxtaposition, constitute very skilful traces of the painter's hand." Emi had retrospective exhibitions at the Museum of Modern Art, Kamakura in 2004 and Himeji City Museum of Art in 2010. In 2004, Momiya summarized Emi's career as follows: "The evolving creation of the ever-changing painter [Emi] Kinuko has developed from bright nudes to dark ones; from semi-abstraction to austere geometric abstraction; from minimalist abstraction to an expressionistic utilization of a thick ground; and then to expressive abstraction; then through a time of fluctuation; to a production with natural actions incorporated by employing the 'dissolving' technique; to creation by the painter’s own, sure hand skill. Most recently, in the early twenty-first century, the forms depicted in [Emi's] canvases have become freer and freer and the hues brighter and brighter." Emi died on January 13, 2015, in Yokohama, at the age of 91.

=== Activity in Yokohama ===
In her personal life, she married a French-American sailor and moved to Yamate, Yokohama, Kanagawa Prefecture in 1951. According to her daughter, Anna Ogino, despite being quite poor, Emi never painted for sale but only painted what she really wanted to paint. Her paintings apparently did not sell well when she was newly married, but she was able to establish herself as an artist nonetheless. After establishing her reputation as a painter, she became the founder of the Kanagawa Women Artists Association (Kanagawa-ken Joryū Bijutsuka Kyōkai; 神奈川県女流美術家協会), established in 1961, and has supported the activities of women artists in Kanagawa Prefecture for many years. She has held classes in Yokohama and organized the annual open-call exhibition for women artists, Women Artists Exhibition (Joryū ten; 女流展). In recognition of these activities, Emi was awarded the 40th Yokohama Culture Award (横浜文化賞) in 1991 and the 46th Kanagawa Culture Award (神奈川文化賞) in 1997. She was also honored by Kanagawa Prefecture in 1978 (神奈川県県民功労者表彰) and the Minister of Education in 1984 (地域文化功労者文部大臣表彰) for her contribution to local cultural activities.

== Selected exhibitions ==
=== Solo exhibitions ===
- 1954 Sausalito Arts Center, Sausalito, California
- 1955 Galerie de l’Odeon, Paris
- 1956 Muramatsu Gallery (村松画廊), Tokyo
- 1956 Fūgetsudō Gallery (風月堂ギャラリー), Tokyo
- 1957 Muramatsu Gallery (村松画廊), Tokyo
- 1958 Ginza Gallery (銀座画廊), Tokyo
- 1960 Nihonbashi Shirokiya Department Store (日本橋白木屋), Tokyo
- 1961 Tokyo Gallery (東京画廊), Tokyo
- 1996 Yokohama Civic Art Gallery (横浜市民ギャラリー), Yokohama
- 2004 The Museum of Modern Art, Kamakura (神奈川県立近代美術館鎌倉)
- 2010 Himeji City Museum of Art (姫路市立美術館)

=== Group exhibitions ===
- 1949 4th Kōdō Exhibition
- 1950 5th Kōdō Exhibition (won the Encouragement Prize)
- 1951 6th Kōdō Exhibition (won the Newcomer's Prize)
- 1952 6th Women Artists Association Exhibition (女流画家協会展)
- 1952 7th Kōdō Exhibition (won the Kōdō Bijutsu Prize)
- 1956 10th Women Artists Association Exhibition
- 1957 15 Vanguard Artists (前衛美術の15人), The National Museum of Modern Art (国立近代美術館; present The National Museum of Modern Art, Tokyo, 東京国立近代美術館)
- 1957 11th Women Artists Association Exhibition
- 1958 12th Women Artists Association Exhibition (won the Mainichi Newspaper Prize; 毎日新聞社賞)
- 1958 Development of Modern Japanese Abstract Painting (抽象絵画の展開), The National Museum of Modern Art, Tokyo
- 1958 Second Shell Art Award Exhibition (第2回シェル美術賞展), The Museum of Modern Art, Kamakura (won the third prize)
- 1958, 41st Pittsburgh International Exhibition of Contemporary Painting and Sculpture
- 1959 13th Women Artists Association Exhibition
- 1960 3rd Guggenheim International Award
- 1960 Pintura Japonesa Contemporanea, Museu de Arte Moderna do Rio de Janeiro
- 1961 6th Tokyo Biennale (日本国際美術展)
- 1962 31st Venice Biennale Domestic Exhibition of Selected Works (第31回ベニス・ビエンナーレ国際美術展 出品作品国内展示会), Bridgestone Museum of Art (ブリヂストン美術館, present Artizon Museum, アーティゾン美術館)
- 1962 31st Venice Biennale, Japan Pavilion, Venice
- 1962 Oil Painting and Sculpture in Modern Japan (近代日本の造形), The National Museum of Modern Art, Tokyo
- 1963 Views of Contemporary Japanese Ceramics and Trends in Contemporary Painting (現代日本陶芸の展望ならびに現代絵画の動向), inaugural exhibition of The Annex Museum of the National Museum of Modern Art in Tokyo (国立近代美術館京都分館, present The National Museum of Modern Art, Kyoto, 京都国立近代美術館)
- 1963 7th Tokyo Biennale
- 1964 Postwar Contemporary Japanese Art (戦後の現代日本美術展), The Museum of Modern Art, Kamakura
- 1964 TOKYO 1964, Tokyo Gallery
- 1965 8th Tokyo Biennale
- 1977 Tokyo Metropolitan Art Museum Collection, Focus on New Acquisitions (東京都美術館収蔵作品展 新収蔵作品を中心として), Tokyo Metropolitan Art Museum
- 1981 Kaichi Ohashi Collection World of Contemporary Art (大橋嘉一コレクションから 現代美術の世界), Nara Prefectural Museum of Art
- 1989 Museum Collection by Artists Associated with Yokohama, with a Focus on Oil Paintings (所蔵作品展−横浜ゆかりの作家たち...油彩画を中心として), Yokohama Museum of Art
- 1997 Collection Exhibition of Women Painters in Kanagawa (収蔵品による 神奈川の女性画家たち展), The Museum of Modern Art, Kamakura Annex
- 2003 Another History (もうひとつの現代), inaugural exhibition of The Museum of Modern Art, Hayama
- 2005 Japanese Women Artists in Avant-Garde Movements, 1950–1975 (前衛の女性1950–1975), Tochigi Prefectural Museum of Fine Arts

== Major public collections ==
- The Miyagi Museum of Art
- Museum of Contemporary Art Tokyo
- The Museum of Modern Art, Kamakura & Hayama
- Nara Prefectural Museum of Art
- The National Museum of Art, Osaka
- Okawa Museum of Art
- Takamatsu Art Museum
- Yokohama Civic Art Gallery
- Yokohama Museum of Art
