= Kannonzaki Park =

Park in Yokosuka, Japan

Coordinates: 35°15′22.8″N 139°44′27″E

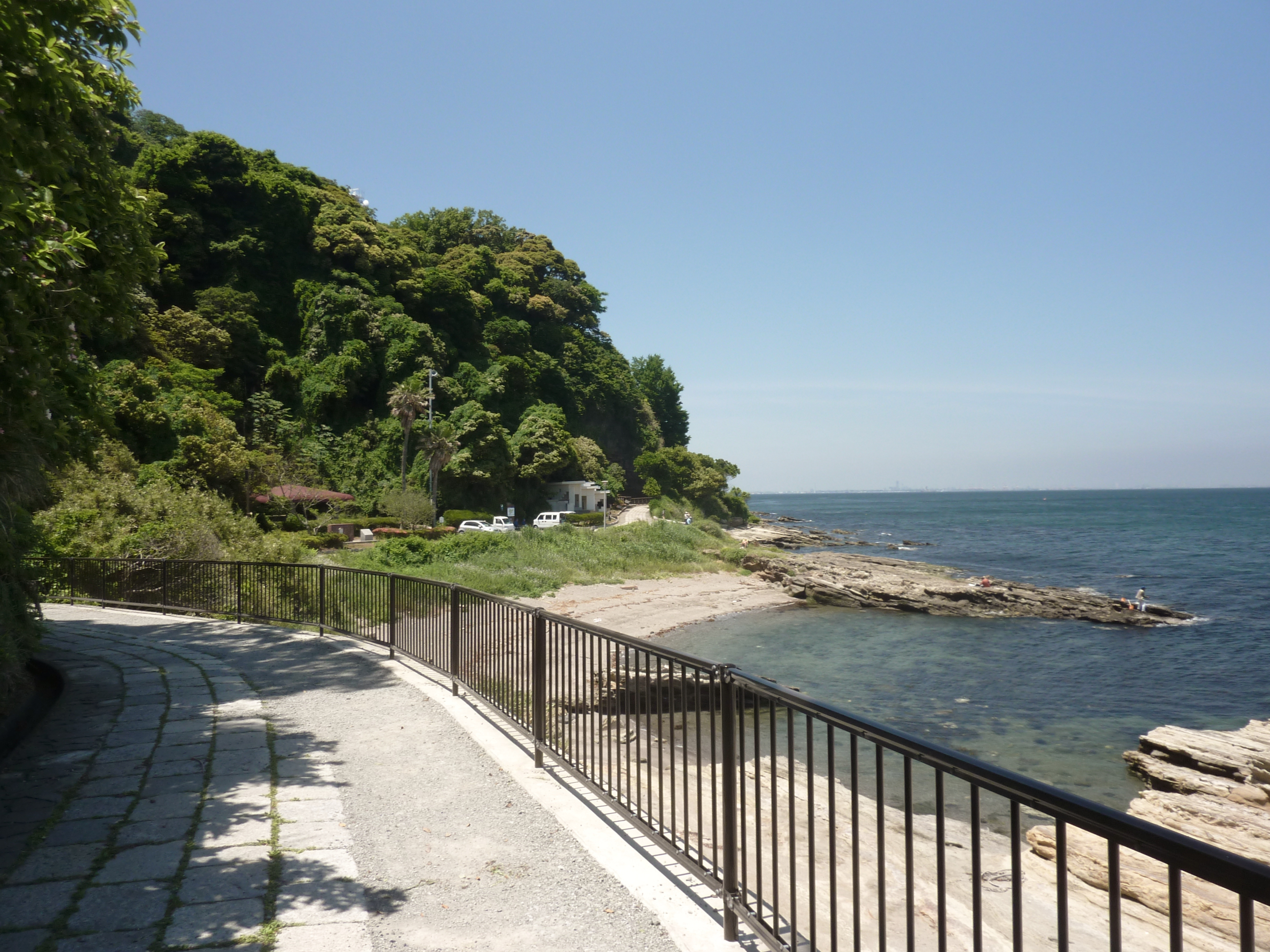
Coastal promenade, at Kannonzaki Park, Yokosuka, Japan

Kannonzaki Park (Japanese: 観音崎公園) is a prefectural-level combined scenic-city park, located at Cape Kannon (Kannonzaki), the northeastern tip of the Miura Peninsula, Yokosuka City, Kanagawa, Japan. It is a park that makes the most of the rich nature, such as the laurel forest and the coastal rocky shore of the area.

In its 70.2-hectare area are found: the park management center, the Kannonzaki Lighthouse, the Yokosuka Museum of Art, the Kannonzaki Nature Museum (Japanese: 観音崎自然博物館), a day camp site, the coastal and hill trails, etc.

The visitors to this park can enjoy "Ship watching", as it is located on the Uraga Channel, Japan's busiest sea lane.

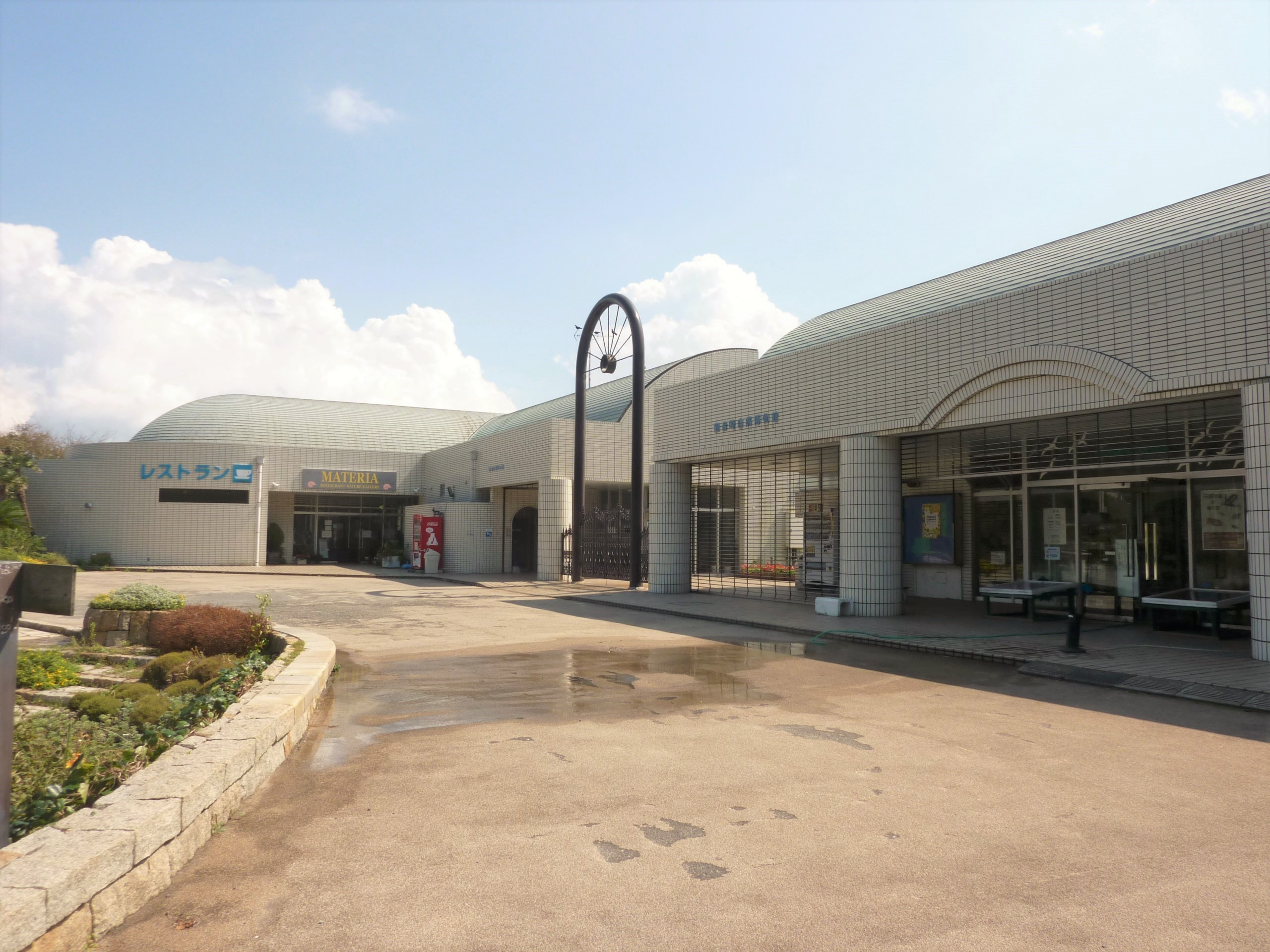
The Kannonzaki Museum of Natural History (right) and its restaurant (left)

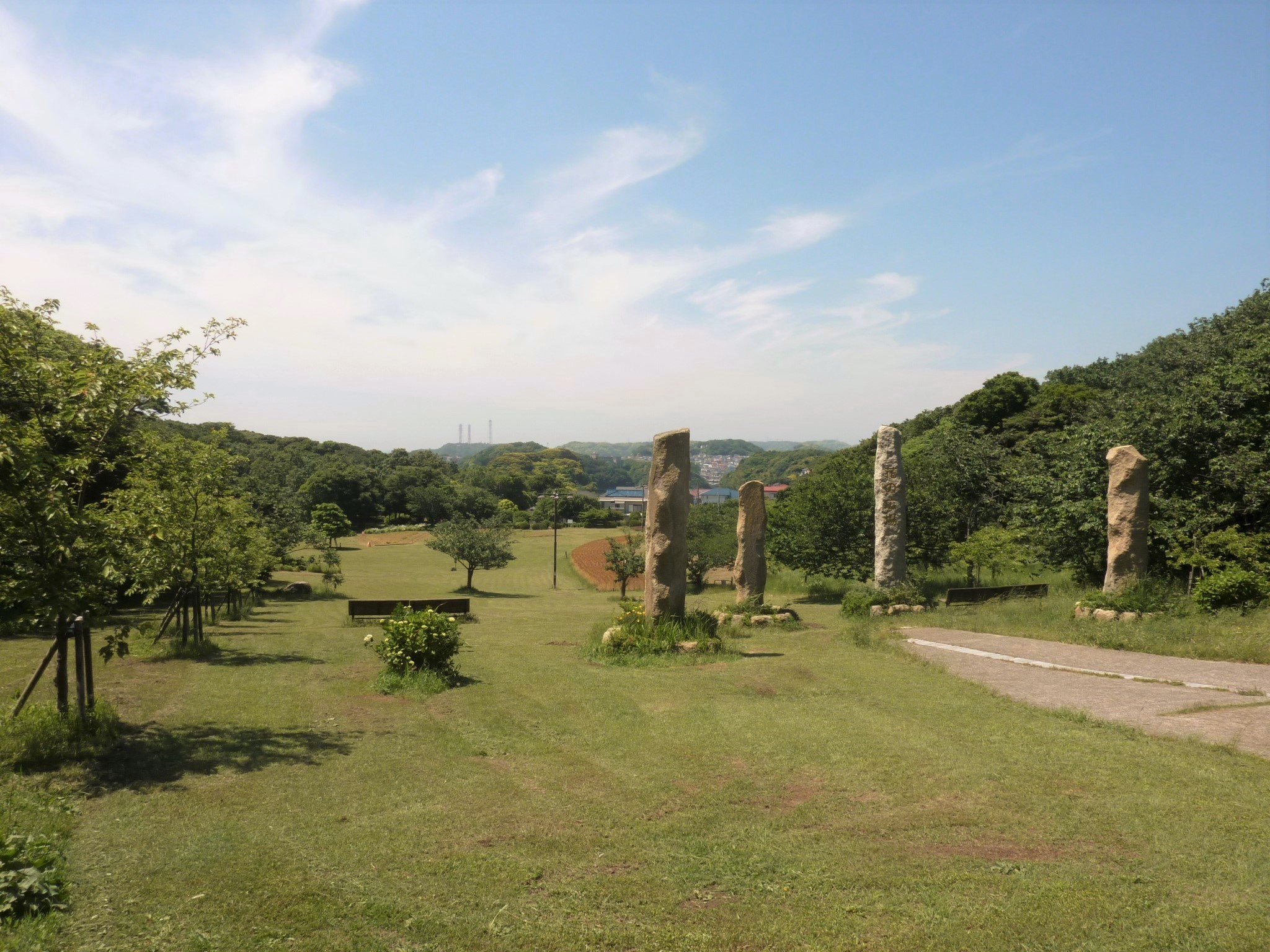
The Flower Plaza

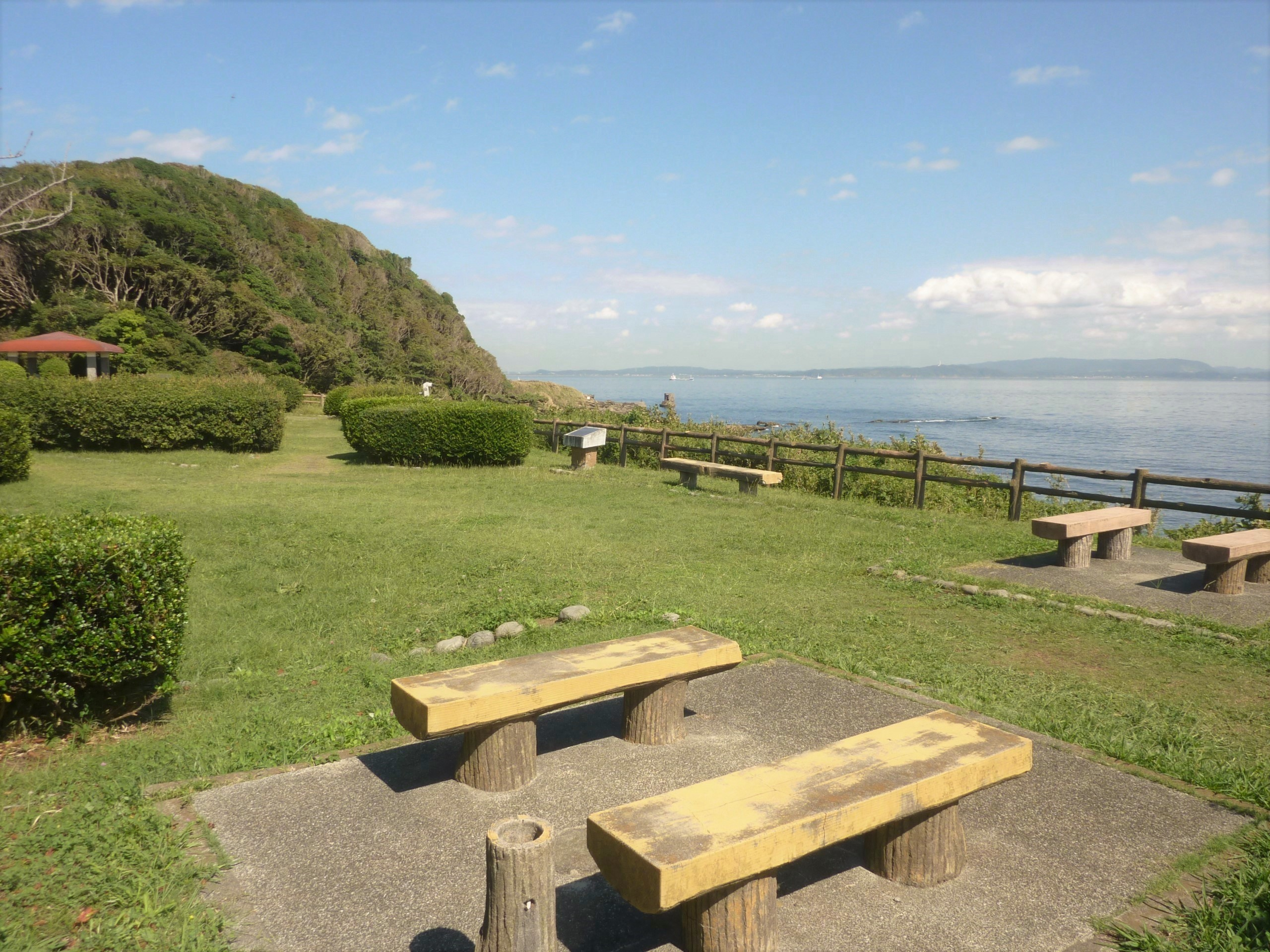
The View Garden for Ship watching

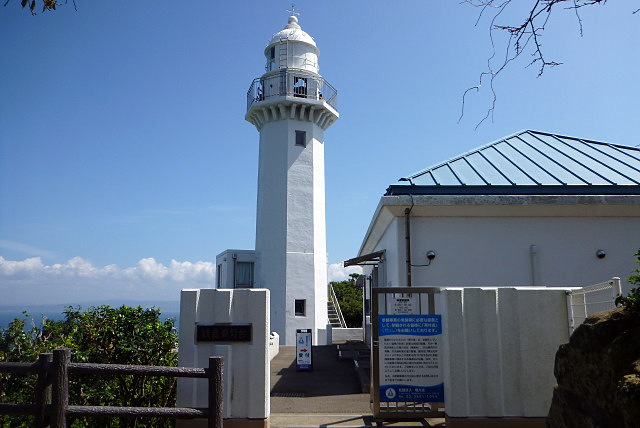
The Kannonzaki Lighthouse

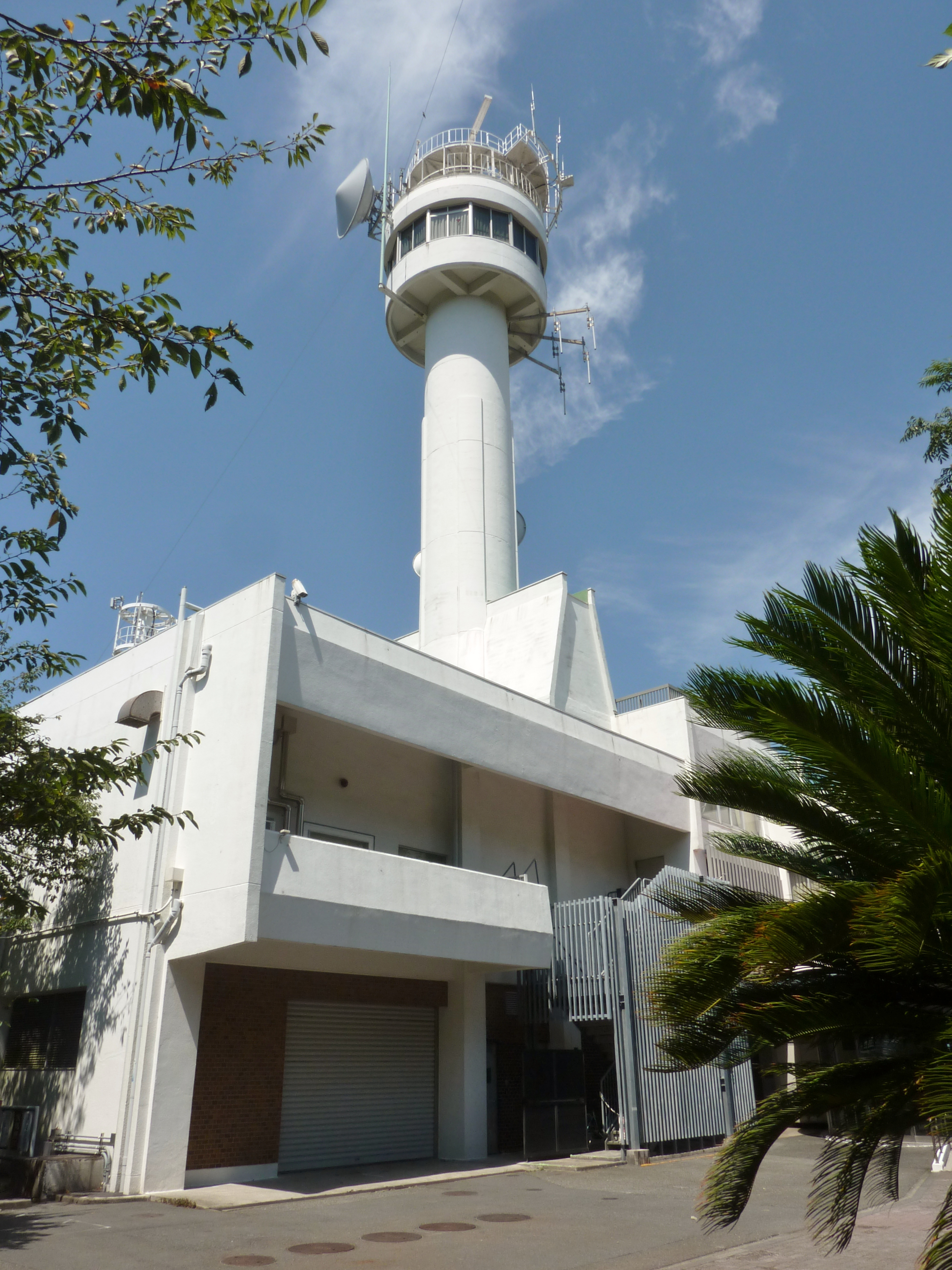
Tokyo Bay Maritime Traffic Information Service Radar (2016)

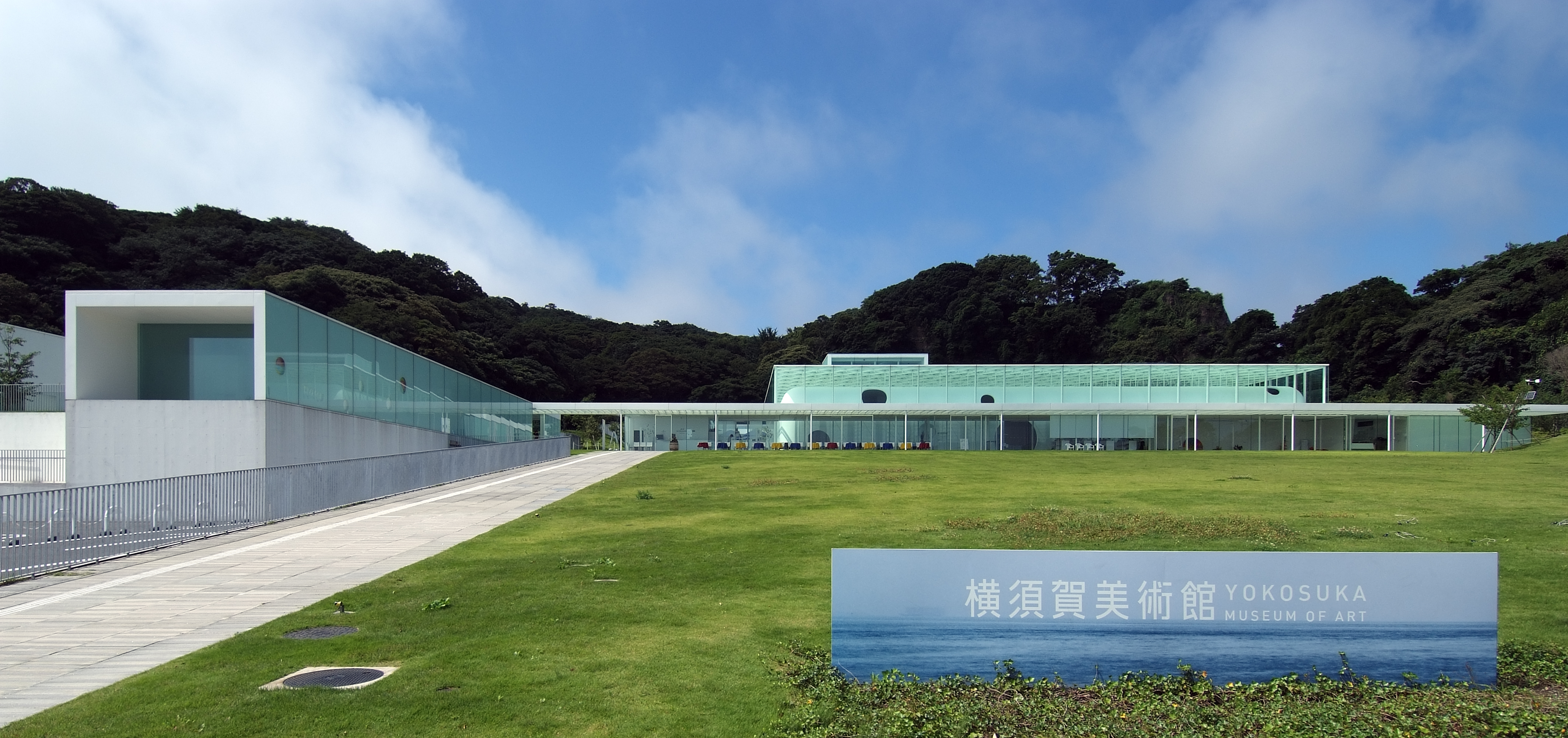
The Yokosuka Museum of Art and its restaurant

== See also ==
- Ship watching
- Local attractions of Yokosuka
