= Kinuko =

- Gender: Female

Origin
- Origin: Japanese
- Meaning: Different meanings depending on the kanji used

Kinuko (written: 絹子) is a feminine Japanese given name. Notable people with the name include:

- Kinuko Tanida (谷田 絹子; 1939–2020), Japanese volleyball player
- Kinuko Y. Craft (born 1940), Japanese-born American painter and illustrator
- Kinuko Emi (江見 絹子; 1923–2015), Japanese painter
- Kinuko Ito, Japanese beauty queen
