= Louis Moilliet =

- Born: Louis René Moilliet; 6 October 1880; Bern, Switzerland
- Died: 24 August 1962 (aged 81); Vevey, Switzerland
- Occupation: Painter
- Known for: Painting, watercolour, stained glass

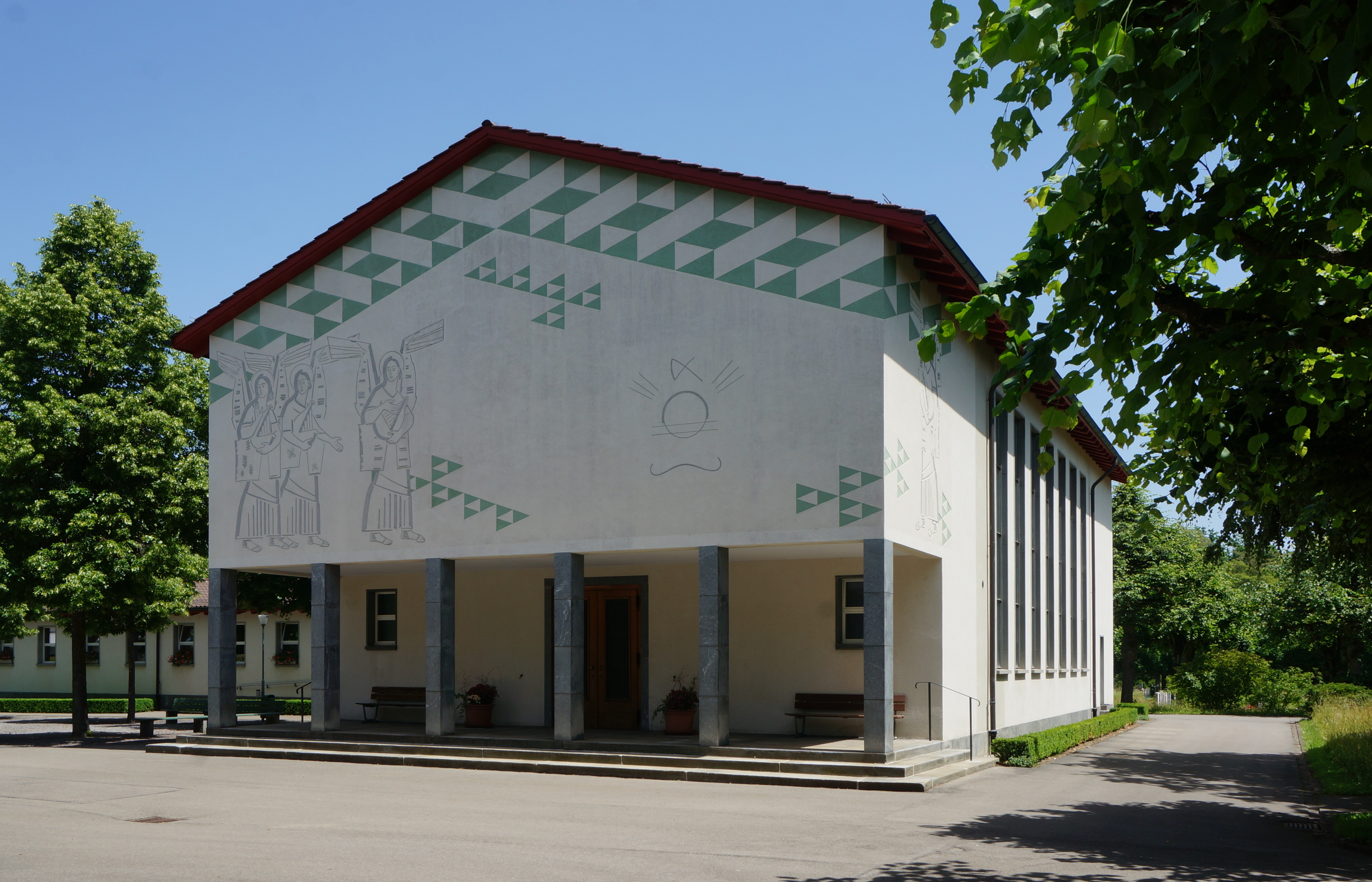
Moilliet’s sgraffito at the Schosshalden Cemetery in Bern, 1939

Louis René Moilliet (6 October 1880 – 24 August 1962) was a Swiss painter, watercolourist and stained-glass artist. He trained in Bern and at art schools in Germany, and later spent a study period in Rome. He became connected with the circle of Der Blaue Reiter in Munich, and in 1914 travelled to Tunisia with Paul Klee and August Macke. His work was influenced by Robert Delaunay’s Orphism, and later centred on watercolour and stained-glass commissions. He represented Switzerland at the 31st Venice Biennale in 1962.

== Biography ==
Louis Moilliet was born on 6 October 1880 in Bern. He met Paul Klee while attending a humanities-oriented secondary school in Bern, and the two occasionally painted and played music together. He began his artistic training in 1898 with an apprenticeship as a decorative painter at the de Quervain painting business in Bern, and from 1900 took drawing lessons at the Bern trade school.

From 1901, Moilliet continued his training in Germany, spending time at the artists' colony in Worpswede and studying at the academies in Düsseldorf and Weimar. In 1904, he entered the master class at the Stuttgart Academy, where he later studied with Adolf Hölzel. In 1906, he worked on frescoes for the theatre hall of the Pfullinger Hallen. After a study stay in Rome in 1907, Moilliet returned to Switzerland and made his first journey to Tunisia in 1908.

Moilliet met August Macke in 1909. In 1910, he married Hélène Gobat and settled in Gunten on Lake Thun. From 1911, he was connected with the circle of Der Blaue Reiter in Munich, where he met artists including Franz Marc and Wassily Kandinsky. On 8 October 1911, he introduced Klee to Kandinsky in Munich.

From 7 to 22 April 1914, Moilliet travelled to Tunisia with Klee and Macke. The journey included stops in Tunis, Sidi Bou Saïd, Saint-Germain, Hammamet and Kairouan.

After the death of Hélène Moilliet in 1916, Moilliet led an unsettled life, living in several places in Switzerland and travelling frequently in Europe and North Africa. In 1919, he spent time in Ticino with Hermann Hesse, who used him as the model for the painter Louis in Klingsors letzter Sommer. In 1923, he married Margaretha Barth-Zaeslin.

At the end of 1939, Moilliet settled with his partner Kay Oederlin near Vevey, first in Corsier-sur-Vevey and from 1950 in La Tour-de-Peilz. He died in Vevey on 24 August 1962.

== Work ==
Moilliet worked in painting, watercolour and stained glass. Around 1911, Moilliet’s interest in Robert Delaunay’s Orphism changed his use of colour, leading to a brighter palette and more frequent use of pure colours. Between 1913 and 1923, he produced relatively few oil paintings. These works reflected the influence of Robert Delaunay and August Macke, while remaining independent in style. Important paintings from this period included Berliner Variété (1913), Im Zirkus (1914/15) and Le grand carrousel (1916/17).

In these paintings, figures and coloured planes are arranged in layered spaces, with translucent areas of colour. From the mid-1910s, Moilliet moved away from oil painting and concentrated increasingly on watercolour. From 1918 to 1933, he produced a comparatively small group of watercolours characterised by an unusual intensity of light. He often returned to earlier watercolours, altering them by removing colour, strengthening selected areas or adding geometric forms.

From the 1930s, Moilliet worked mainly on church windows. His stained-glass commissions included windows for the Lukaskirche in Lucerne, the Zwinglikirche in Winterthur and the chapel of the Burgerspital in Bern. His later work in stained glass continued his interest in colour and space.

== Exhibitions ==
In 1937, the first retrospective of Moilliet’s work was held at the Kunsthaus Zürich. In 1962, he represented Switzerland at the 31st Venice Biennale. In 2014, the Zentrum Paul Klee in Bern marked the centenary of the Tunisia journey with an exhibition that reunited works created during or inspired by the trip for the first time in almost 30 years.
