= Cape Kannon =

Cape Kannon (Japanese: 観音崎, romanized: Kannon-zaki) may refer to the following capes in Japan:

- Cape Kannon (Kanagawa, Japan), a cape in Yokosuka, Kanagawa
- Cape Kannon (Ishikawa, Japan), a cape in Nanao, Ishikawa
