= Yokosuka Museum of Art =

Museum in Yokosuka, Kanagawa Prefecture, Japan

- 横須賀美術館
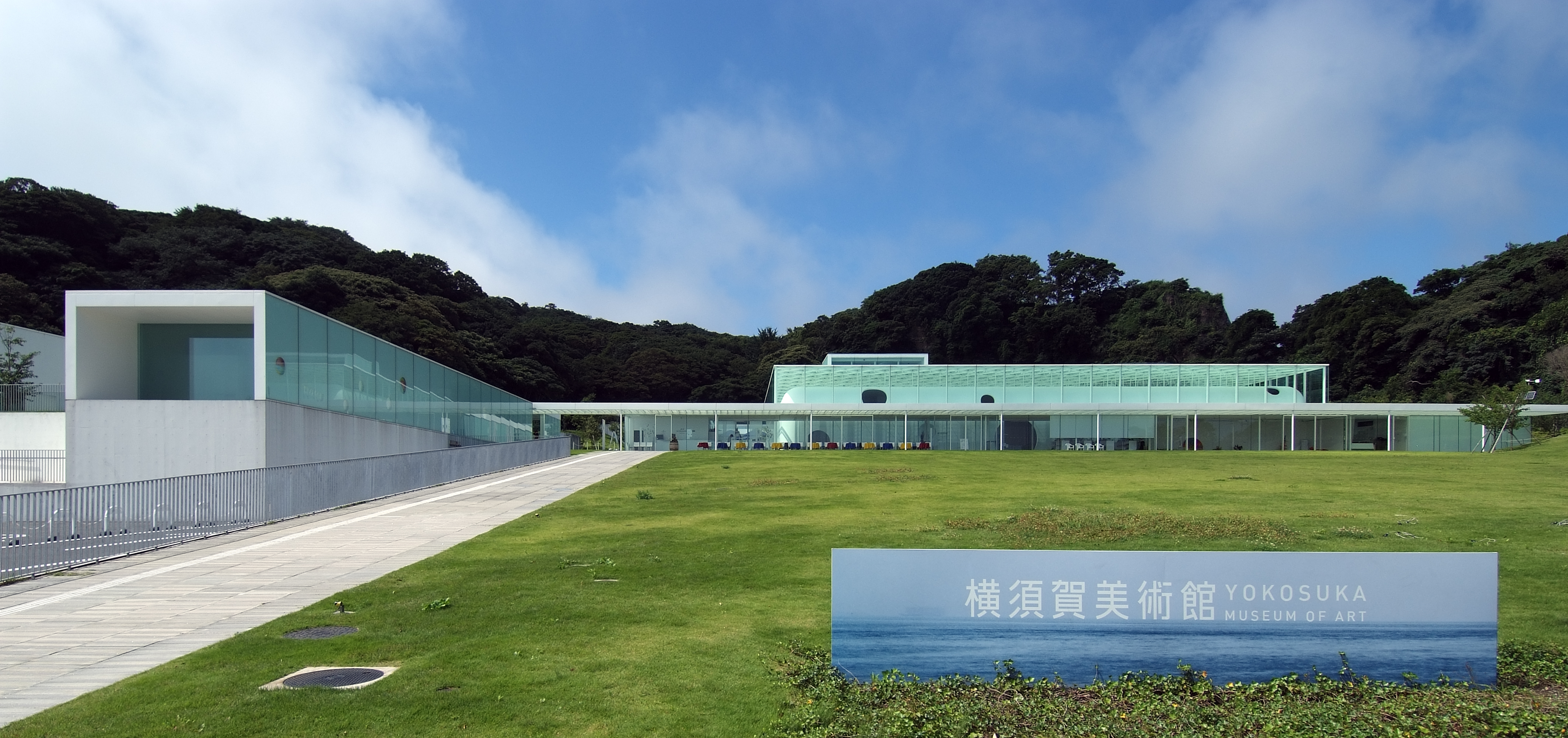

General information
- Location: 4-1 Kamoi, Yokosuka, Kanagawa Prefecture, Japan
- Coordinates: 35°15′34″N 139°44′17″E
- Opened: 28 April 2007

Website
- www.yokosuka-moa.jp/en

Yokosuka Museum of Art (横須賀美術館, Yokosuka bijutsukan) opened in Kannonzaki Park (観音崎公園), Yokosuka, Kanagawa Prefecture, Japan, in 2007. Architect: Riken Yamamoto. The collection, numbering some 5,000 pieces, includes works by Fujishima Takeji and Nakamura Tsune.

== See also ==
- Kannonzaki Lighthouse
- List of Cultural Properties of Japan - paintings (Kanagawa)
