= Cape Kannon (Kanagawa, Japan) =

Cape in Kanagawa Prefecture, Japan

Coordinates: 35°15′21″N 139°44′39″E

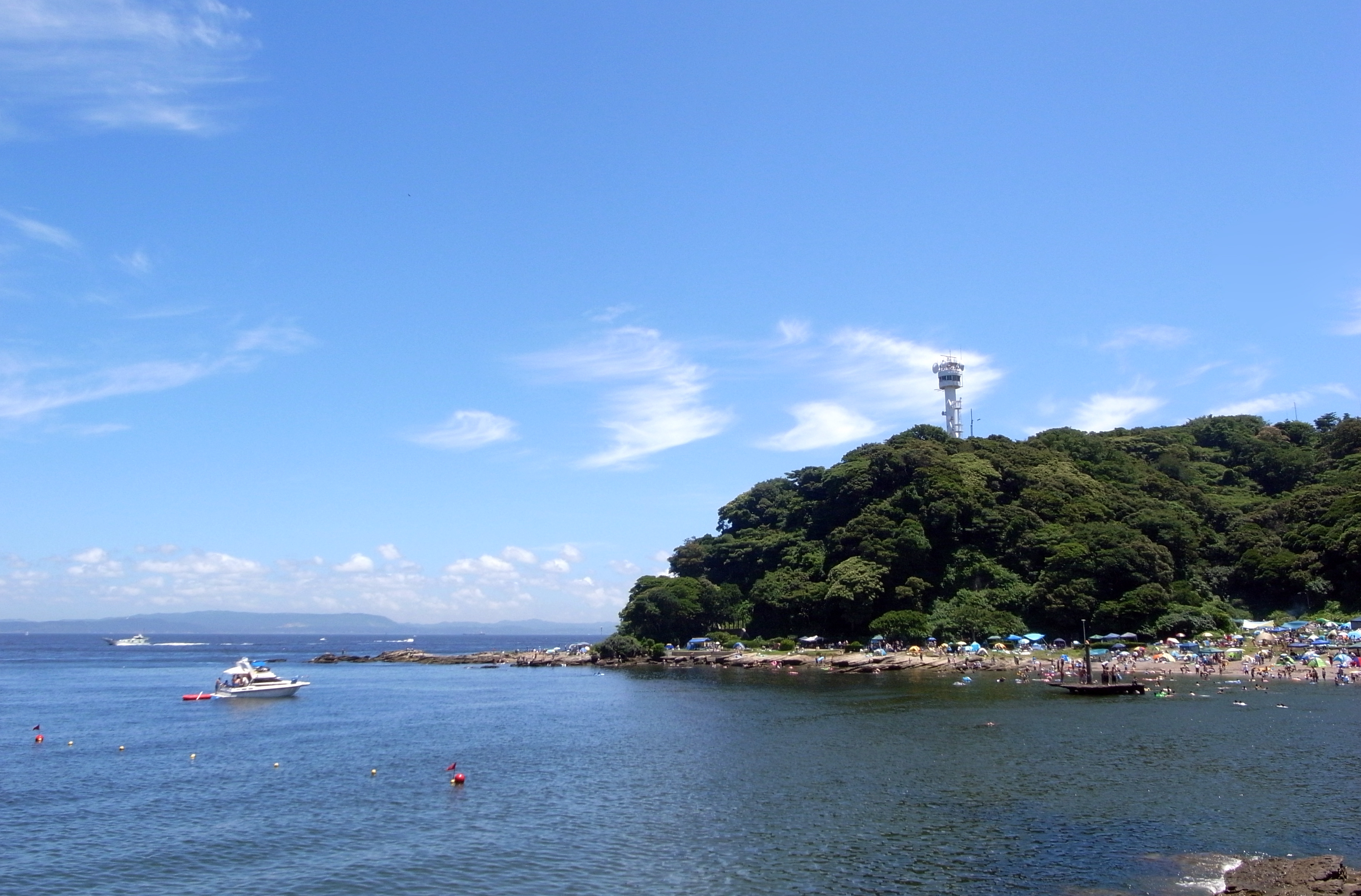
Cape Kannon in Yokosuka, Kanagawa, Japan

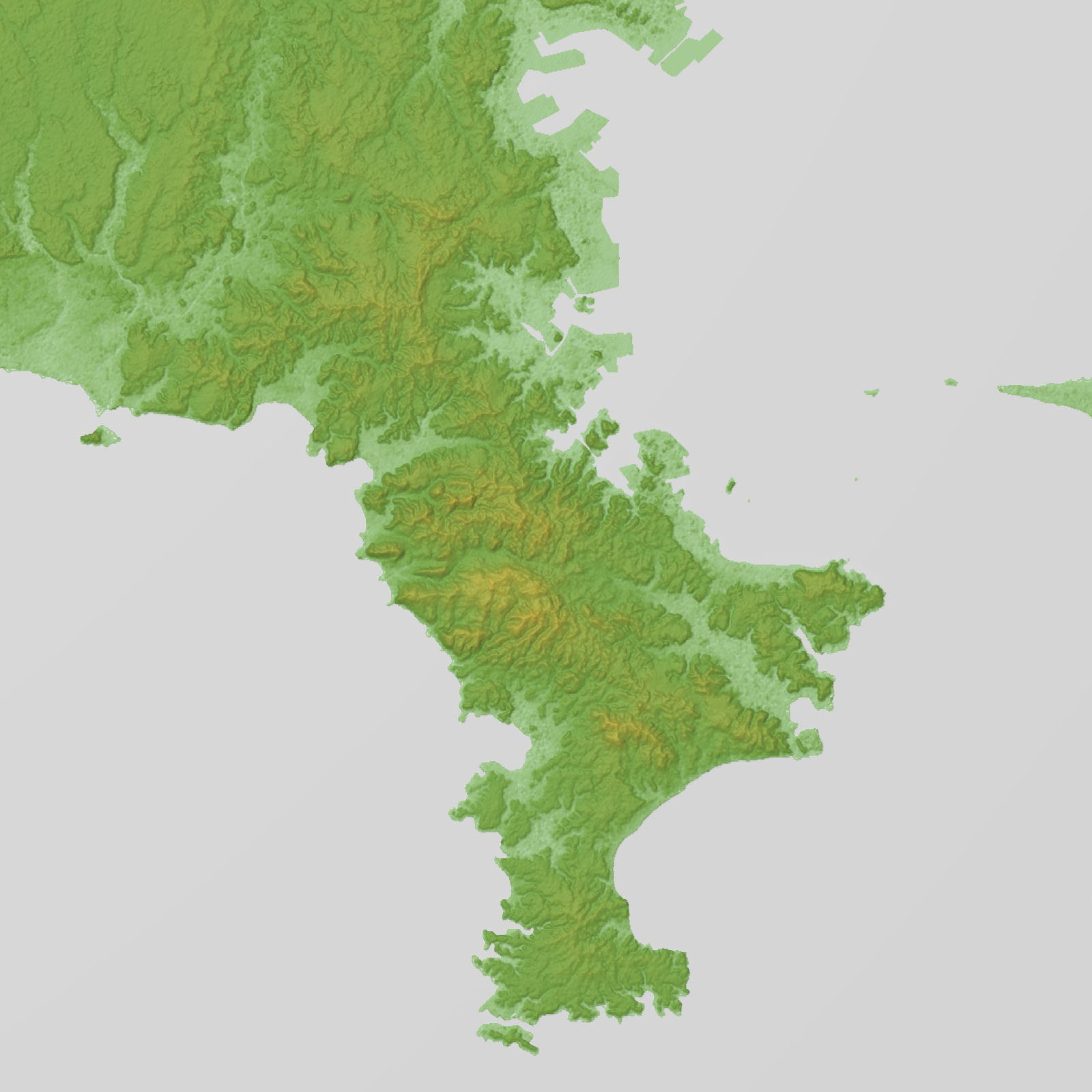
The position of Cape Kannon in the Miura Peninsula, Kanagawa, Japan

Cape Kannon (Japanese: 観音崎, Kannonzaki) is a cape at the easternmost point of the Miura Peninsula, which divides Tokyo Bay from the Pacific Ocean.

It is on a rocky coast where the Kannonzaki Lighthouse, Japan's first modern lighthouse (after two reconstructions) stands, and faces the Uraga Channel, Japan's busiest sea lane.

Cape Kannon is located 3 kilometers east from Uraga Station of Keikyu Main Line railway. It is now part of Kannonzaki Park. Visitors to the Cape Kannon area can enjoy ship watching.

It is perhaps best known as the spot where Lemuel Gulliver, the central character of the 1726 book Gulliver's Travels, landed in Japan in volume 3. It is featured as Xamoschi, a corruption of its then-spelling Kannonsaki.

== See also ==
- Ship watching
- Kannonzaki Park
