= Anna Ogino =

Japanese author

- 荻野 アンナ
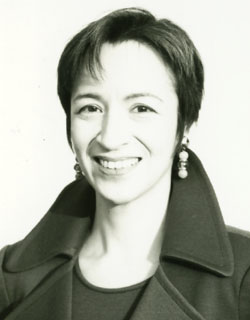
- Anna Ogino in 2005
- Born: Anna Gaillard; Kanagawa, Japan
- Citizenship: Japanese
- Education: Paris-Sorbonne University
- Alma mater: Keio University
- Occupations: Writer, professor
- Writing career
- Language: Japanese
- Genre: Fiction
- Notable works: Seoi mizu; Horafuki-Anri no bōken; Kani to kare to watashi
- Notable awards: Akutagawa Prize; Yomiuri Prize; Itō Sei Literature Prize

Anna Ogino (荻野 アンナ, Ogino Anna; born November 7, 1956) is a Japanese author and emeritus professor of literature at Keio University. She has won the Akutagawa Prize, the Yomiuri Prize, and the Itō Sei Literature Prize.

== Early years ==
Ogino was born as Anna Gaillard in Naka-ku, Yokohama, Kanagawa Prefecture, to a Japanese mother and a French-American father. Her mother, Kinuko Emi, was a prominent abstract painter. Ogino was naturalized during elementary school, and received her undergraduate and master's degree in French literature from Keio University, as well as receiving a scholarship to Paris-Sorbonne University to study Rabelais. In 2002 she became a full professor at Keio.

== Career ==
Ogino began writing in 1983 as text author for comic strips about mermaids. She won the 1991 Akutagawa Prize for Seoi-mizu (背負い水, Water Burden). Her 1991 book Watakushi no aidokusho (私の愛毒書, My love-hate affair with books), a critical novel that compares eminent male Japanese authors to different types of foods, has received scholarly attention for its subversive use of parodic language. In 2002 she received the 53rd Yomiuri Prize for Horafuki Anri no bōken (ホラ吹きアンリの冒険, The Adventures of Henri the Braggart). In 2008 she received the 19th Itō Sei Literature Prize for Kani to kare to watashi (蟹と彼と私, The Crab, Him and Me), "a tour de force of parody and trauma chronicling her partner’s struggle with, and eventual death from, cancer."

== Recognition ==
- 1991 105th Akutagawa Prize (1991上)
- 2002 53rd Yomiuri Prize (2001年度)
- 2008 19th Itō Sei Literature Prize

== Works ==
- Yukitai (遊機体, Floating Objects), Bungeishunjū, 1990, ISBN 9784163121802
- Watakushi no aidokusho (私の愛毒書, My Love-Hate Affair with Books), Fukutake Shoten, ISBN 9784828823980
- Seoi-mizu (背負い水, Water Burden), Bungeishunjū, 1991, ISBN 9784163127606
- Blūgeru tonda (ブリューゲル、飛んだ), Shinchōsha, 1991, ISBN 978-4103817017
- Ai robu ango (アイ・ラブ安吾), Asahi Shimbun Publication, 1992, ISBN 978-4022640734
- Kojiki gaiden (コジキ外伝), Iwanami shoten, 1992, ISBN 4000041576
- Madona no henshin shikkaku (マドンナの変身失格), Fukutake Shoten, 1993, ISBN 978-4828824635
- Shūkan Ogino (週刊オギノ), Kadokawa Shoten, 1993, ISBN 978-4041895016
- Annaryū genki ga nani yori (アンナ流 元気がなにより), Kairyūsha, 1993, ISBN 4759303650
- Taberu onna (食べる女), Bungeishunjū, 1994, ISBN 978-4-16-314690-4
- Momo monogatari (桃物語), Kodansha, 1994, ISBN 4062054434
- Raburē shuppan (ラブレー出帆 ), Iwanami shoten, 1994, ISBN 978-4000037327
- Hyakumanchōsha to kelkun suru kyō (百万長者と結婚する教), Kodansha, 1995, ISBN 978-4062079402
- Anna no kōjō kankō (アンナの工場観光), Kyōdō Tsūshinsha, 1995, ISBN 4764103516
- Metantei Maririn (名探偵マリリン), Asahi Shimbun Publication, 1995, ISBN 978-4022568694
- Nama mugi・name gome・name akubi (生ムギ・生ゴメ・生アクビ), Kodansha, 1995, ISBN 978-4062075657
- Sora no hon (空の本), Parco Publishing, 1996, ISBN 978-4891944865
- Pari hana no pasa-ju monogatari (パリ 華のパサージュ物語), NHK shuppan, 1996, ISBN 978-4140052341
- Hanshi hansei (半死半生), Kadokawa shoten, 1996, ISBN 978-4048729741
- Shi no hakken: yōroppa no kosō o tazunete (死の発見：ヨーロッパの古層を訪ねて), co-written with Matsubara Hideichi and Yōrō Takeshi, Iwanami shoten, 1997, ISBN 978-4000233163
- Ichinichi sanshoku hirune jiten (一日三食ひるね辞典), TBS Britanica, 1999, ISBN 978-4484992112
- Makkana uso no tsukikata (まっかなウソのつき方), co-written with Terry Itō, Eagle Publishing, 1999, ISBN 978-4901191005
- Sora tobu buta (空飛ぶ豚), Kyōdō Tsūshinsha, 1999, ISBN 978-4764104211
- 『Warau』shikanai! (『笑う』しかない！), Mikasa Shobo, 2001, ISBN 978-4837960133
- Horafuki Anri no bōken (ホラ吹きアンリの冒険, The Adventures of Henri the Braggart), Bungeishunjū, 2001, ISBN 9784163198200
- Kenage (けなげ), Iwanami shoten, 2002, ISBN 978-4000227209
- Ton ton hyōshi (とんとん拍子), Seiryusha, 2002, ISBN 978-4860290023
- Anna no enerugi kankō (アンナのエネルギー観光), Ei Shuppansha, 2004, ISBN 978-4777900596
- Raburē de genki ni naru (ラブレーで元気になる), Misuzu Shobo, 2005, ISBN 978-4622083146
- Kani to kare to watashi (蟹と彼と私, The Crab, Him and Me), Shueisha, 2007, ISBN 9784087748727
- Hataraku Anna no hitorikko kaigō (働くアンナの一人っ子介護), Gurafu sha, 2008, ISBN 978-4766212099
- Naguru onna (殴る女), Shueisha, 2009, ISBN 978-4087713183
- Erotama (えろたま), Chuokoron Shinsha, 2013, ISBN 978-4120044960
- Denki sakka (電気作家), Goma Books, 2015, ISBN 978-4777116171
- Kashisugawa (カシス川, River of Cassis), Bungeishunjū, 2017, ISBN 9784163907345
- Rōfujin marianu suzuki no heya (老婦人マリアンヌ鈴木の部屋), Asahi Shimbun Publication, 2021, ISBN 978-4022517456

== Translations ==
- Tonda tabyurin (とんだタビュラン), translation of Raoul Taburin (1995) by Jean-jacques Sempé, Taiheisha, 1997, ISBN 978-4924330436
- Koibitotachi- a-mu・su-ru (恋人たち- ア－ム・ス－ル), translation of Âmes sœurs (1991) by Jean-jacques Sempé, Taiheisha, 1998, ISBN 978-4924330474
- Ohana no sukina ōkami kun (おはなのすきなおおかみくん), translation of Maxime Loupiot by Marie-Odile Judes, Kodansha, 1999, ISBN 978-4062619851
- San・torope (サン・トロペ), translation of Saint Tropez (1968) by Jean-jacques Sempé, Taiheisha, 1999, ISBN 978-4924330528

== Works translated into English ==
- "Mama Drinks Her Tea," trans. Vyjayanthi Ratnam Selinger in More Stories by Japanese Women Writers: An Anthology, ed. Kyoko Selden and Noriko Lippit (M.E. Sharpe, 2011), 102–126.
- "Nue," trans. Amanda C. Seaman. U.S.-Japan Women's Journal 58 (2020): 21–34.
