= Riken Yamamoto =

Japanese architect

- 山本 理顕
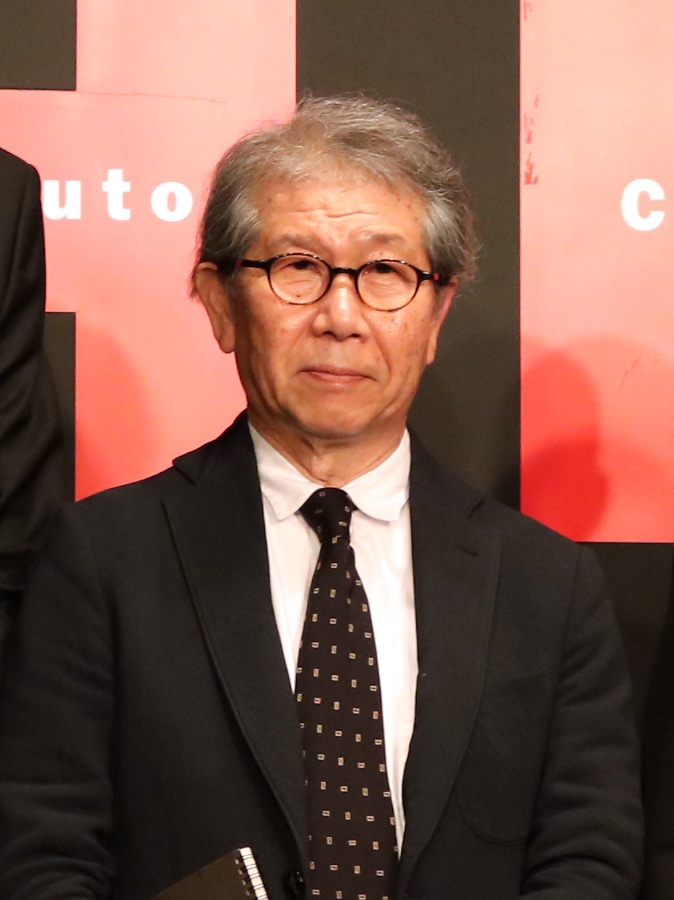
- Yamamoto in 2016
- Born: Michiaki Yamamoto (Note: Same kanji but different pronunciations.); April 15, 1945 (age 81); Beijing, China
- Education: Nihon University, Tokyo University of the Arts
- Occupation: Architect
- Awards: Architectural Institute of Japan Award; Pritzker Architecture Prize

Riken Yamamoto (山本理顕, Yamamoto Riken) (born 1945) is a Japanese architect. In 2024, he received the Pritzker Architecture Prize, considered to be the most prestigious award in architecture, becoming the 9th Japanese architect to receive such honor.

== Early life and education ==
Yamamoto was born to Japanese parents in Beijing, China. His parents had moved from Japan to China for his father's work as an engineer as part of the Japanese occupation of China. In 1947, the family returned to a Japan devastated by World War II. In 1949, after his father's death when he was four, Yamamoto moved to his mother's hometown of Yokohama.

In 1967 he completed his bachelor's degree from Nihon University and in 1971 his master's degree from the Tokyo University of the Arts. Afterwards he continued his studies at the University of Tokyo under Hiroshi Hara.

== Career ==
Yamamoto founded the Yamamoto & Field Shop Co.Ltd in 1973.

From 2000 to 2011 he was a professor at Yokohama National University and at the Graduate school of Engineering of the Nihon University. As of 2015 he taught at his alma mater Nihon University.

Some of his most representative works are the Rotunda Building (Yokohama, 1981); the Hamlet Building (Tokio, Shibuya-Ku, 1988), or the apartment blocks Ryukoentoshi (Yokohama, 1992).

In 2026, he ran in the Yokohama mayoral election but was defeated, receiving 3.5% of the vote.

== Recognition ==
Under the many awards Riken Yamamoto has won, the most recent achieved by him are: The Japan Institute of Architects Award for the Yokosuka Museum of Art (2010) Building Contractors Society Prize for the Namics Techno Core (2010), Building Contractors Society Prize for the Yokosuka Museum of Art (2008) or the 25th Fukushima Architecture Culture Award, highest award for the Fukushima ecoms Pavilion, SUS Fukushima Factory (2007).

In 2024, Yamamoto was awarded the Pritzker Architecture Prize. On the occasion, architect and Jury Chair Alejandro Aravena stated about Yamamoto's work that "one of the things we need most in the future of cities is to create conditions through architecture that multiply the opportunities for people to come together and interact. By carefully blurring the boundary between public and private, Yamamoto contributes positively beyond the brief to enable community. He is a reassuring architect who brings dignity to everyday life. Normality becomes extraordinary. Calmness leads to splendor."

In 2025, Yamamoto was the recipient of the 31st Crystal Award.

== Selected works ==
- 2005: Future University Hakodate Research Building, Hokkaido; SUSTRG Office Project, Fukushima
- 2007: Yokosuka Museum of Art, Kanagawa Prefecture
- 2008: Namics Techno Core, Niigata; Guan Yuan Housing, Beijing; Dragon Lily's House, Gunma
- 2009: Utsunomiya University Center for Optics Research Tochigi
- 2012: Tianjin Library
- 2018: The Circle at Zürich Airport
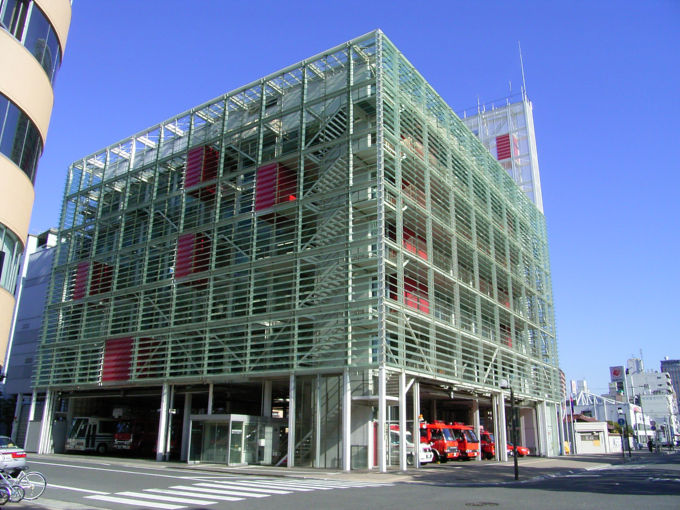
Hiroshima West Fire Department

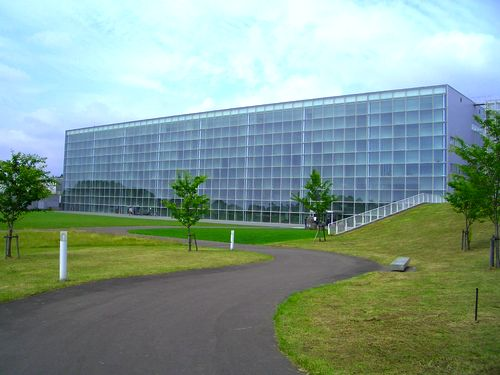
Future University Hakodate

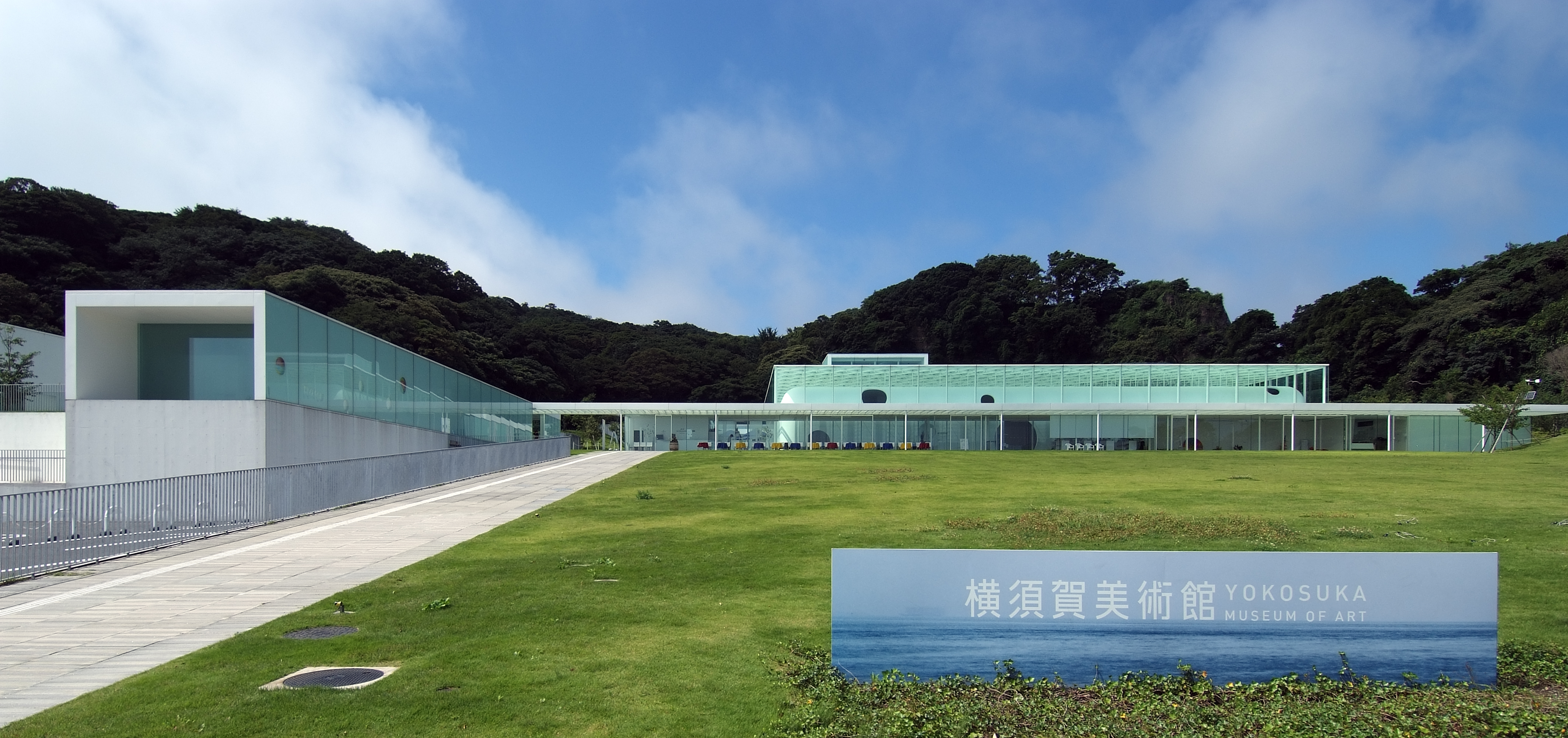
Yokosuka Museum of Art

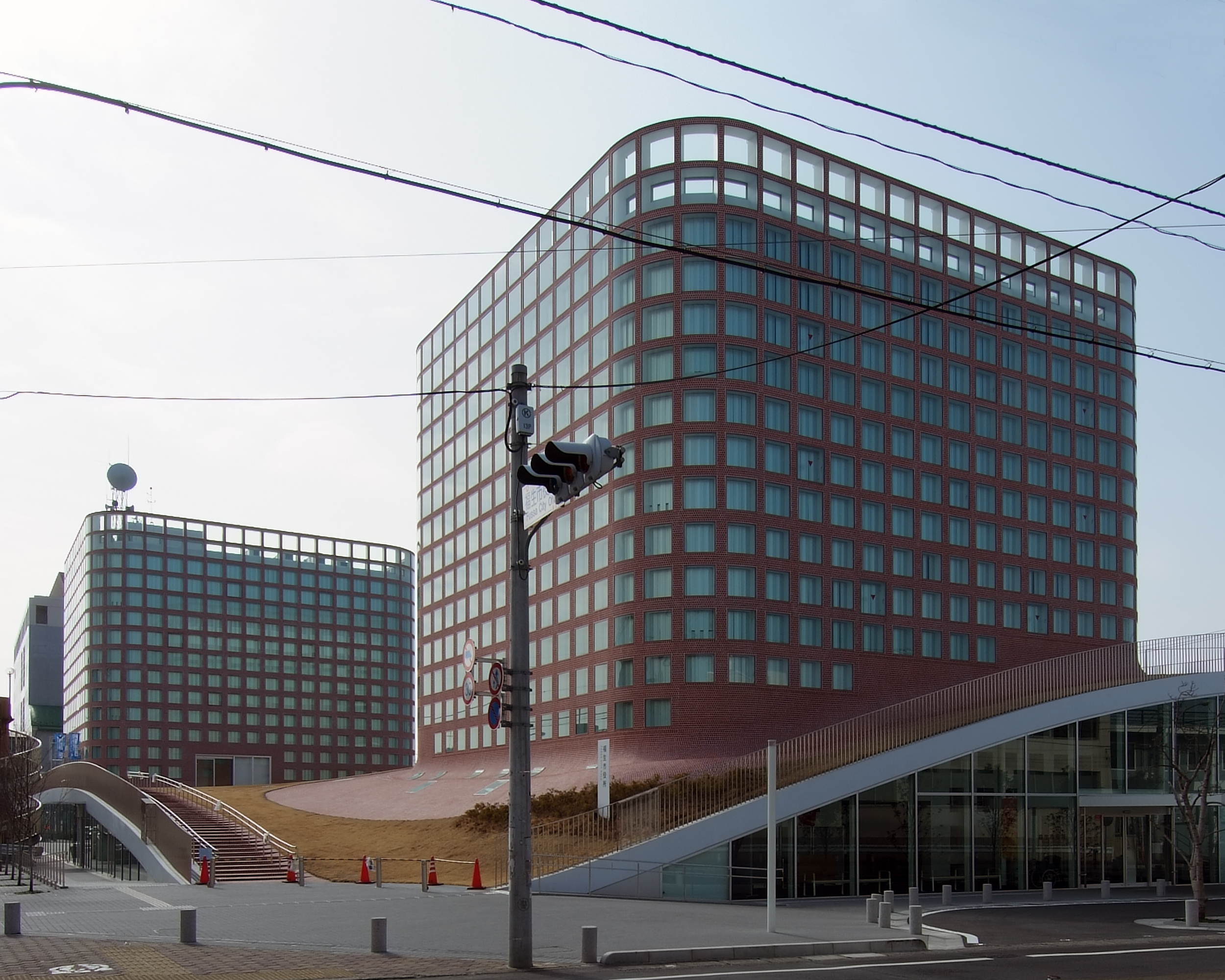
Fussa City Hall
