= Ship watching =

Outdoor activity

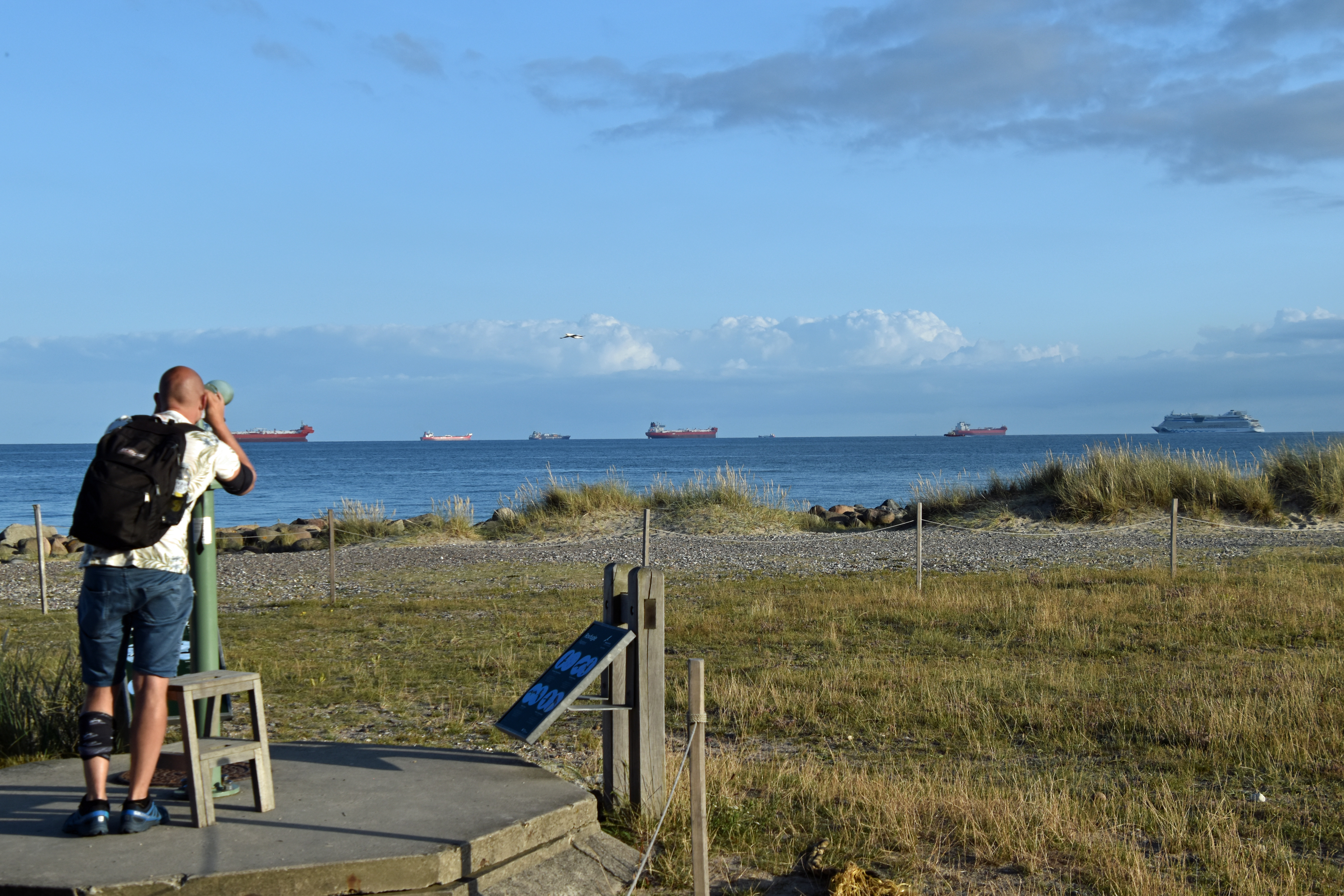
Ship watching using a telescope.

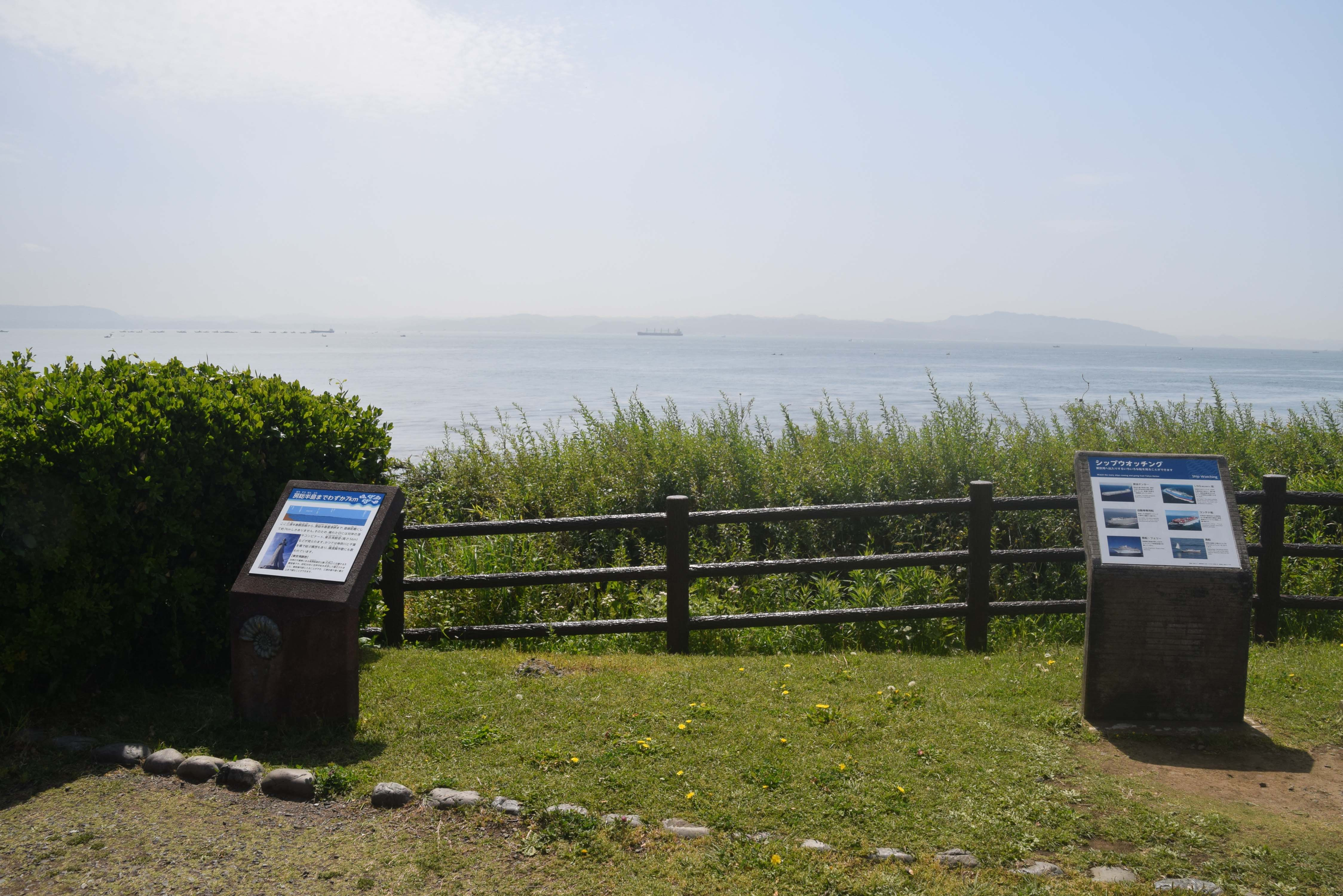
Watching ships that pass through the Uraga Channel, at Kannonzaki Park, Yokosuka, Japan

Ship watching or ship spotting is a form of outdoor activity and tourism that is carried out worldwide by observing and photographing various ships in the waterways where there is a lot of ship traffic.

In the United States, for example, ship watching is practiced in Two Harbors, Minnesota, over Lake Superior, while in Japan, it is done on the ships that pass through the Uraga Channel at Kannonzaki Park, Kanagawa, Japan. In China, as many ships go up and down the Changjiang, River Bank Parks (Chinese: 江滩公园) in Hankou and in Wuchang, in the city of Wuhan, are good places to enjoy ship watching.

== See also ==
- Whale watching
- Outdoor recreation
- Water transport
