= Jack Tilton =

American art dealer

Jack Tilton

John Havemeyer Tilton Jr (April 25, 1951 – May 7, 2017) (known as Jack Tilton) was an American art dealer based in New York City who in 1983 founded Jack Tilton Gallery. Tilton Gallery operated under Rogers Tilton's direction at 8 East 76th Street in New York City from 2017-2025.

== Early life ==
Tilton was born in Littleton, New Hampshire to Marjory Seidler, a homemaker, and John, Sr., who had studied art at Yale University, designed Christmas cards, and served in the New Hampshire Legislature.

Tilton was educated at Tilton School (no family connection) and earned a bachelor's degree in business from Babson College in 1974. After taking some graduate courses in business at the University of New Hampshire with a direction towards banking, he withdrew from his studies.

== Career ==
Tilton set forth to New York City where a family friend, Betty Parsons -- best known for her early championing of the Abstract Expressionists including Jackson Pollock and Mark Rothko -- had a prominent gallery on 57th Street in Manhattan. Tilton started as an assistant there, and continued to work for Parsons from 1976 to 1982.

After Parsons' death in 1982, Tilton took over the space and converted it into his own establishment, the Jack Tilton Gallery, which opened its inaugural show in autumn 1983. In 1993, Tilton moved the gallery to Greene Street in the SoHo neighborhood of Manhattan. In 1999, he partnered with Bennett and Julie Roberts to open Roberts & Tilton in Los Angeles, California, while continuing to run Jack Tilton Gallery in New York.

In the 1990s, Tilton's growing interest in Chinese contemporary art led him to start "The China Project", an artist's residency in Tongzhou, Beijing in China. In 2005, he relocated Jack Tilton Gallery to a townhouse at East 76th Street on the Upper East Side where Franklin Roosevelt and Eleanor Roosevelt were wed.

Tilton was known for cultivating young talent and promoting emerging artists. Tilton Gallery staged debut New York solo exhibitions for artists including Joseph Nechvatal, who was in the first show at the Jack Tilton Gallery,Glenn Ligon,Lyle Ashton Harris, Nicole Eisenman, Francis Alÿs and Marlene Dumas. He also played an important role in the careers of artists Kiki Smith, Fred Tomaselli and David Hammons.

On September 24, 2025, the Gallery announced its closing after its final show Ruth Vollmer.

== Personal life ==
In 1982, Tilton married Constance "Connie" Rogers, an art consultant who had graduated magna cum laude from Radcliffe College and received a master's degree in Art History from Columbia University. Tilton and Rogers Tilton had two sons.

In 2017, Tilton died at the age of 66 due to complications from cancer.
