= Kannonzaki Lighthouse =

Lighthouse in Kanagawa, Japan

Kannonzaki Lighthouse Kannon Saki 観音埼灯台
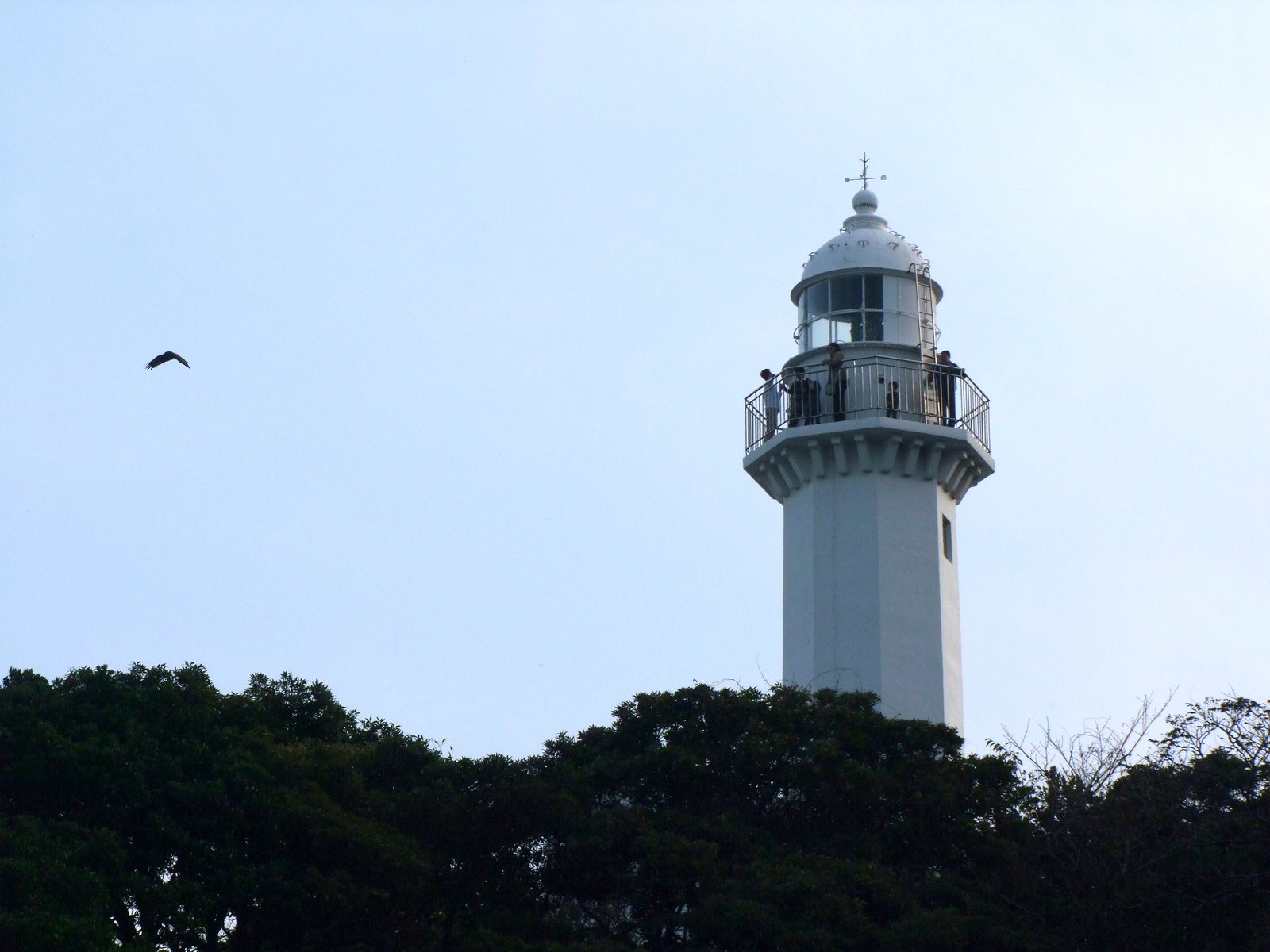
- Kannonzaki Lighthouse
- Location: Cape Kannon; Miura Peninsula; Yokosuka, Kanagawa; Japan
- Coordinates: 35°15′22.2″N 139°44′42.8″E

Tower
- Constructed: February 11, 1869 (first)
- Construction: concrete tower
- Height: 19 feet (5.8 m)
- Shape: octagonal tower with gallery and lantern
- Markings: white tower

Light
- First lit: 1925 (current)
- Focal height: 56 feet (17 m)
- Lens: fourth order Fresnel lens
- Intensity: 140,000 candela
- Range: 19 nautical miles (35 km; 22 mi)
- Characteristic: Fl (2) W 15s.
- Japan no.: JCG-2030

Kannonzaki Lighthouse (観音埼灯台) is a lighthouse on Cape Kannon, on Miura Peninsula, in Yokosuka, Kanagawa, Japan.

== History ==
The original Kannonzaki Lighthouse was the first lighthouse built in Japan. It was one of the eight lighthouses whose construction was stipulated by the Anglo-Japanese Treaty of Amity and Commerce of 1858. This treaty provided for the development of aids to navigation with the opening of Japanese ports to foreign trade. Modern engineering methods had not been developed in Japan at the time so the Tokugawa Shogunate requested the assistance of the authorities of France and England for the construction of lighthouses and the purchasing of necessary equipment.

The Tokugawa Shogunate specifically planned to construct a lighthouse at the mouth of Tokyo Bay for vessels that would leave the Yokosuka Iron Works then under construction. After the fall of the Tokugawa Shogunate The new Meiji government commenced construction of the first lighthouse with Francois Leon Verny, an employee of the Yokosuka Iron Works, as the chief engineer. The work was commenced in November 1868, and completed after four months. The Lighthouse was first lit on February 11, 1869, during the last months of the Boshin War. The original lighthouse was a western style building made of brick (made at the Yokosuka Iron Works under the instruction of Francois Leon Verny), rectangular in shape, and painted white. It was immediately followed, in December 1869, by the completion of the Nojimazaki Lighthouse, also by Léonce Verny, on the other side of Tokyo Bay.

As structures made of brick are weak against earthquakes, the lighthouse was completely destroyed by the earthquake that occurred on April 26, 1922. The reconstruction of the lighthouse as a reinforced concrete structure was completed on March 15, 1923. However, the new lighthouse functioned for only six months before again being damaged by the Great Kantō earthquake of September 1, 1923 (magnitude 7.9), the lighthouse was fractured with cracks and the top collapsed. Restoration work on the lighthouse was commenced on September 18, 1924, and, on June 1, 1925, the present Kannonzaki Lighthouse was completed.

Kannonzaki is best known today as the lighthouse location in Times of Joy and Sorrow (1957), Keisuke Kinoshita's popular film about the experiences of a lighthouse keeper and his family during WW2, with Kannonzaki prominently featured on the film's poster and advertising.

== Gallery ==
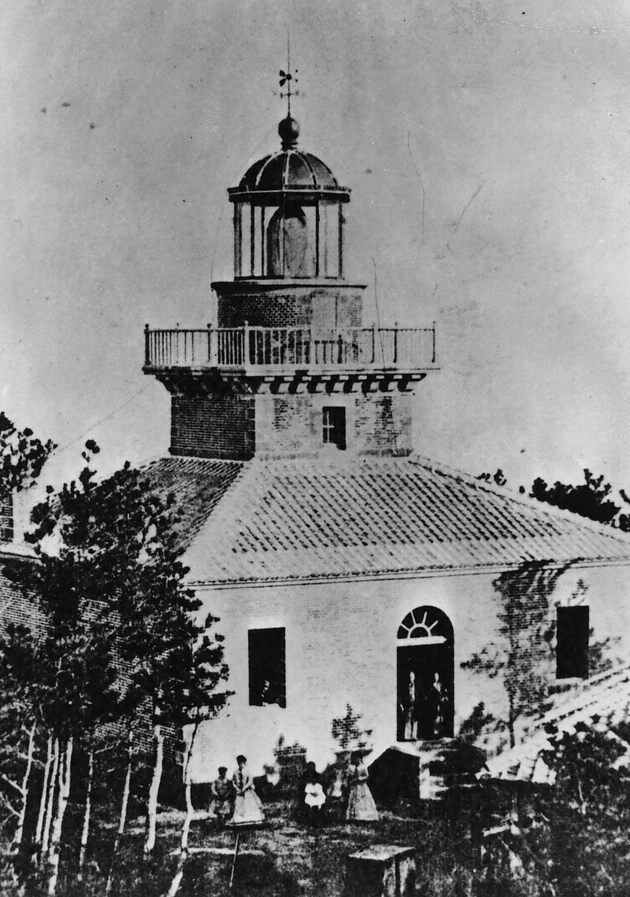
First Kannonzaki lighthouse

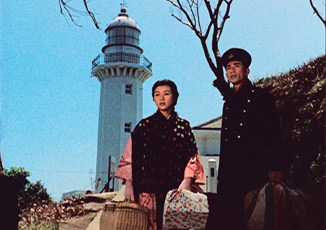
Kannonzaki in the opening scene of Times of Joy and Sorrow

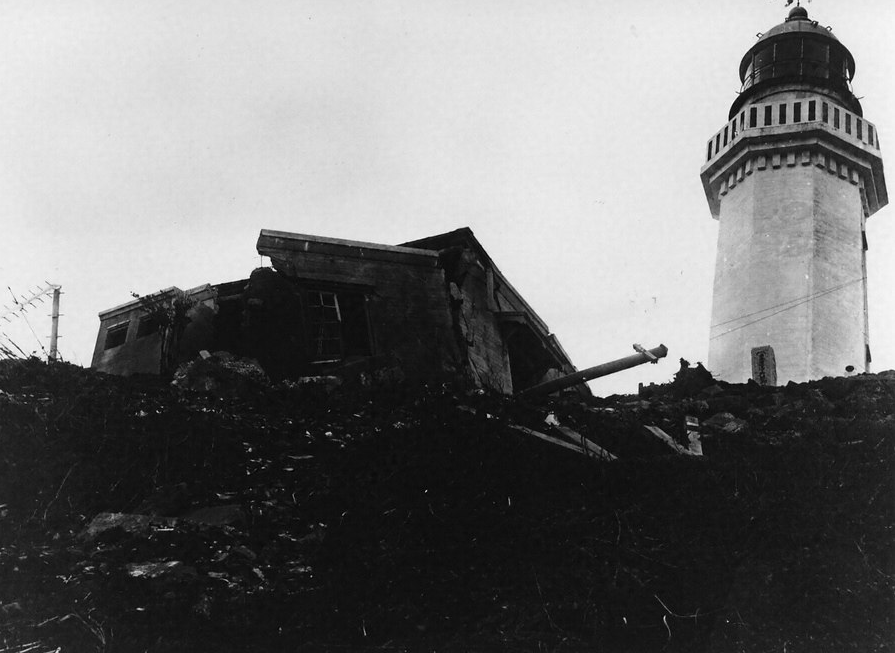
Kannonzaki in 1945

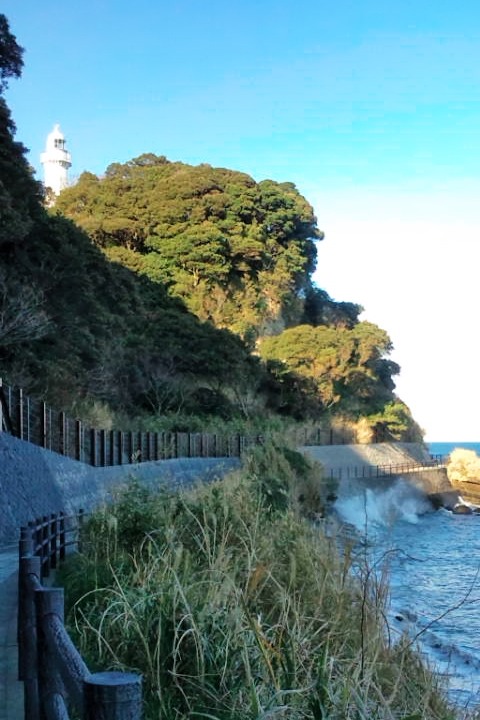
Kannonzaki from below

== See also ==
- List of lighthouses in Japan
