= Museum of Modern Art, Kamakura & Hayama =

Art museum in Japan

Coordinates: 35.2963345°N 139.5307978°E

The Museum of Modern Art, Kamakura & Hayama (神奈川県立近代美術館, Kanagawa Kenritsu Kindai Bijutsukan) is the first public modern art museum in Japan. The museum consists of three halls: Kamakura, Kamakura annex, and Hayama.

== Outline of halls ==
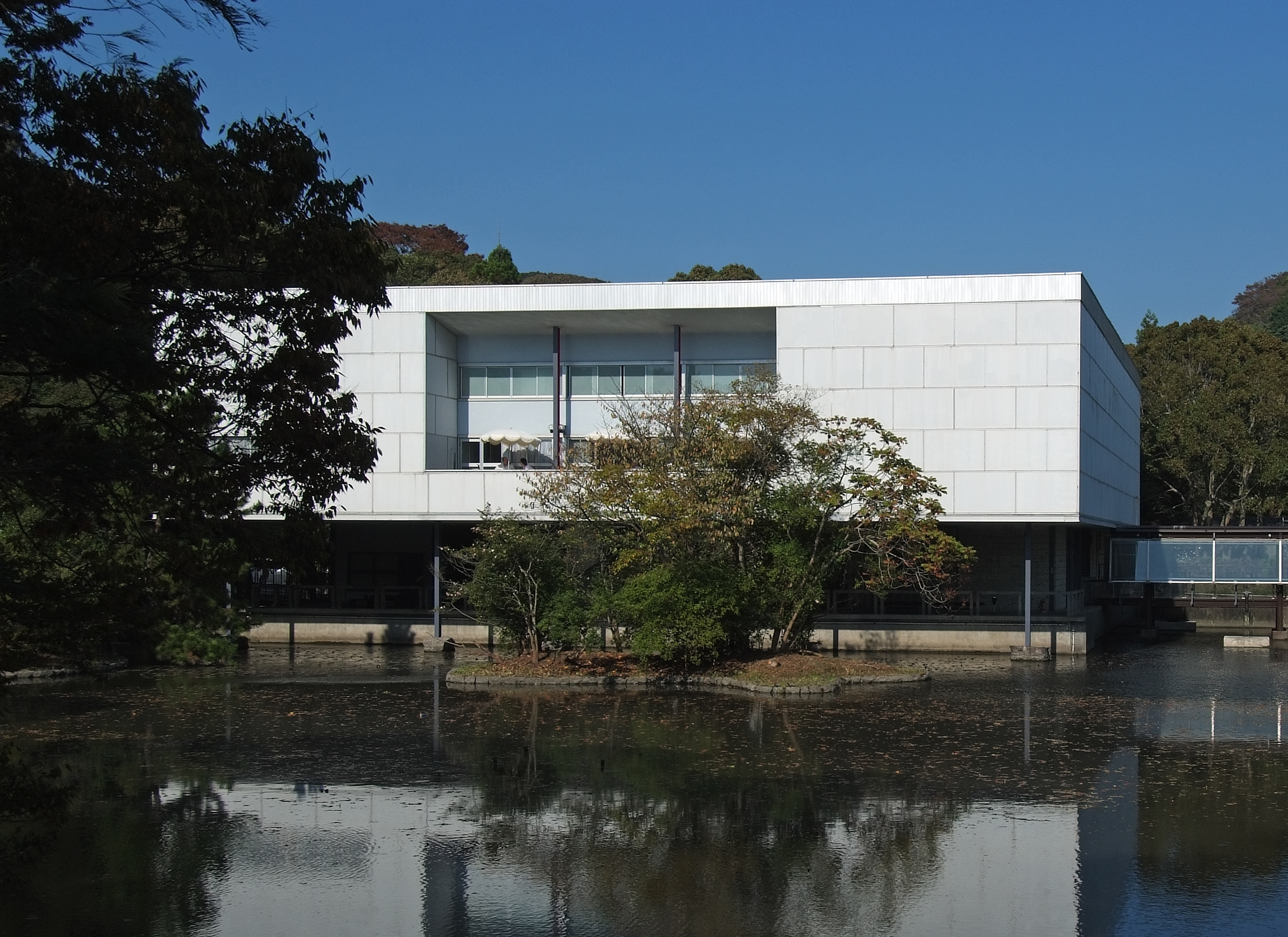
Kamakura hall

=== Kamakura hall (main building) ===
The hall is located in Yukinoshita, Kamakura, Kanagawa prefecture, Japan (within precincts of the Tsurugaoka Hachiman-gū) and is the oldest public modern art museum in Japan, dating back to 1951. The building was designed by Junzo Sakakura. The museum building itself is also highly valued as an example of Japanese modern architecture and was selected as one of the DOCOMOMO Japan 150 in 1999.

=== Kamakura annex ===
Opened in 1984. Designed by Masato Otaka. The hall is mainly used for permanent collections.

=== Hayama hall ===
The hall was opened at Hayama, Miura District, Kanagawa, Japan in 2003. The hall used to be a villa of Prince Takamatsu family. The hall is located along the seashore and has many experimental elements, such as taking available natural light into its exhibition rooms. The hall is mainly used for exhibitions.

== Outline of constructions ==
- Location: 2-1-53, Yukinoshita, Kamakura-shi (the main building and new building), 2-8-1, Yukinoshita, Kamakura-shi (annex), 2208–1, Isshiki, Hayamamachi, Miura-gun (Hayama hall)
- Opening: 1951 (main building), 1966 (new building), 1984 (annex), 2003 (Hayama hall)
- Designers: sakakura associates inc. (main building and new building), Otaka Kenchiku Sekkei Jimusho (annex), AXS SATOW Inc. (Hayama hall)
- Architectural area: 2,435 m^{2} (main building + new building), 1,599 m^{2} (annex), 7,111 m^{2} (Hayama hall)
