= Kumi Sugai =

Japanese painter and printmaker (1919–1996)

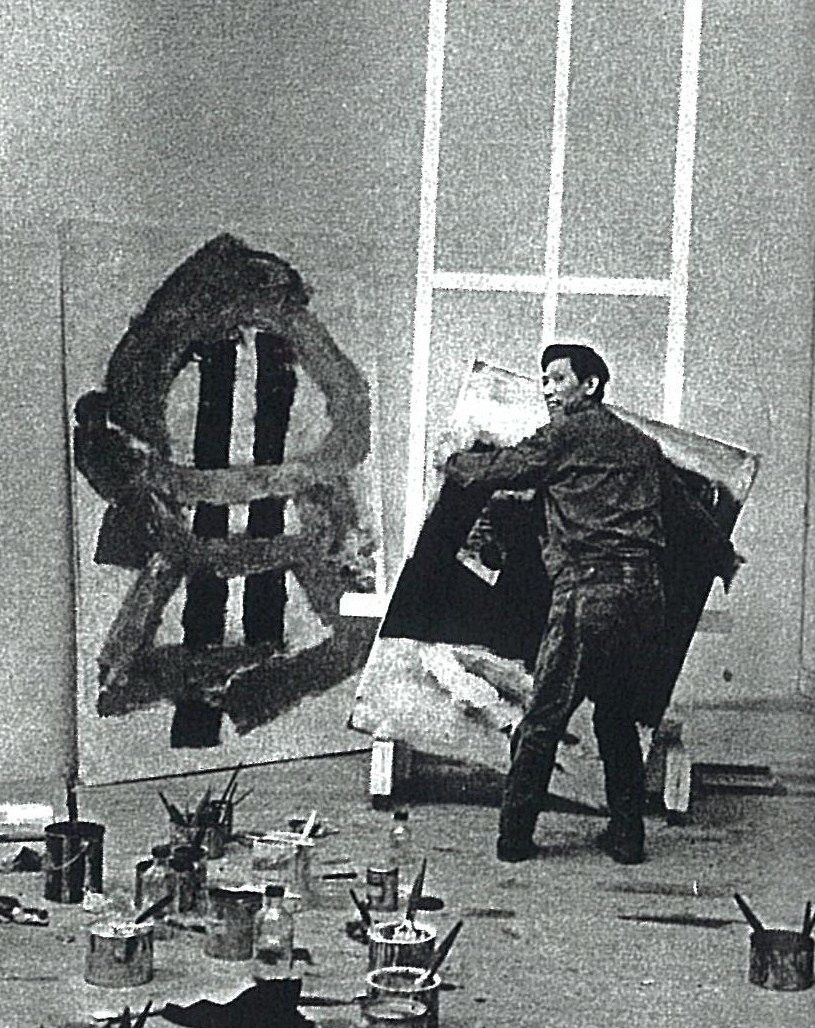
- Kumi Sugai in 1962
- Born: March 13, 1919; Kobe, Japan
- Died: May 14, 1996 (aged 77); Kobe, Japan
- Education: Osaka University of Arts; Académie de la Grande Chaumière
- Occupations: Painter, printmaker

Kumi Sugai (菅井 汲, Sugai Kumi; March 13, 1919 – May 14, 1996) was a Japanese painter and printmaker. Driven by an interest in avant-garde painting, Sugai moved to Paris in 1952 where he quickly attracted critical attention, participating in numerous exhibitions in Paris and abroad. First working in a style resembling informalism or lyrical abstraction, he became affiliated with the Nouvelle École de Paris. During the early 1960s, his artworks radically transformed when he developed a hard-edge abstract style influenced by his interest in automobiles and contemporary urban living. While he did not officially associate himself with any single artistic movement or group, he collaborated on multiple projects with his poet friends, Jean-Clarence Lambert and Makota Ōoka.

== Biography ==
=== Early life and career in Japan ===
Born in Kobe in 1919 to parents of Malay origin, Sugai's upbringing proved unstable. After being given to an adoptive family, he was later entrusted to his biological parents again, now divorced. Hospitalized for heart failure as a young boy, he remained bedridden for two years. At fourteen, he studied briefly at the Osaka School of Fine Arts but was unable to complete his studies due to his ill health.

Sugai began his career in advertising for the Osaka-Kobe based railway company Hankyu, where he worked from 1937 to 1945. While he remained indifferent to this work, he appreciated the opportunity as a railway employee to travel throughout the country.

Sugai embarked on his fine arts practice after the war ended, in 1947. To make ends meet, he illustrated elementary school textbooks. After studying Japanese-style painting (nihonga) with the renowned Nihon Bijutsuin member Teii Nakamura, he became interested in avant-garde painting. He began frequenting the studio of Yoshihara Jirō, a local businessman and artist that would later lead the influential Gutai group. Yoshihara exerted a significant influence on Sugai's paintings during this period, reflecting their shared focus on the materiality of paint and abstracted, childlike forms that call to mind the work of Paul Klee, Joan Miró, and Max Ernst. Another notable aspect of his work at this time is a recurring bird motif. Yoshihara's recognition for Sugai's practice is evidenced by his work being awarded a prize at the 4th Ashiya City Exhibition, an open-call competition at which Yoshihara served as a judge.

=== Move to Paris and early paintings ===
Upon discovering the work of Jackson Pollock and Alexander Calder, Sugai was determined to continue his artistic journey in the United States. However, lacking sufficient funds, he was only able to travel as far as Paris. He arrived there by himself in 1952 and resided in the Montparnasse neighborhood. Initially, he attended the Académie de la Grande Chaumière, where he studied under Edouard Goerg.

His first works produced in Paris remained figurative and echoed the aesthetic of Art Informel. Numerous canvases depicted empty urban landscapes, with geometric lines scratched into the thick oil paint. He also continued painting animals, playfully simplifying their forms.

Jean-Clarence Lambert, an art critic, poet and friend of the artist, recounts that Sugai's early life in Paris was a solitary one. Speaking little French, he joined the community of Japanese artists living in Paris, including Toshimitsu Imai, Hisao Domoto, and the Japanese-American sculptor Shinkichi Tajiri, the last associated with the group CoBrA.

Tajiri invited Sugai to exhibit in the second edition of art writer and critic Charles Estienne's salon Octobre held in 1953. His work was admired by art dealer John Craven, who offered Sugai a contract with his gallery and his first solo exhibition in Paris. Sugai's work also attracted the attention of influential critic and writer Michel Ragon, who included his work in two exhibitions, confirming Sugai's place in the loosely-affiliated Nouvelle École de Paris.

In the mid 1950's, Sugai's painted figures became increasingly abstract. In the late 1950s and early 1960s, he produced a series of large, richly-colored canvases, dominated by blocky, calligraphic geometric shapes. Their titles evoke Japanese folklore: oni, samurai, raishin. Despite their increasing compositional simplicity that draws the eye in with an economy of assured strokes, the artist maintained a thick, textural quality in his use of paint.

Sugai began experimenting with printmaking in 1955, three years after his arrival in Paris. In that year, he produced his first lithograph: a printmaking method popular in France but rare in Japan, where woodblock prints dominated. In 1957, he illustrated La Quête sans fin, a book of Jean-Clarence Lambert's poems, with his lithographs. That same year, he married a painter Kawamoto Mitsuko, whom he met in Paris.

Sugai also created a number of sculptural works in the late 1950s, including Objet, a paintbrush mounted on a small plinth, englobed in paint and taking on an abstract aspect. While sculpture was never a major preoccupation of the artist, he continued to occasionally produce sculptural works throughout the 1960s.

=== Transformation in style and later abstract works: 1962-1990s ===
Sugai stated that 1962 was a transformative year in his career:

Until then, I thought that my works were a part of my life and that I painted with my sweat and my blood. And yet, I found that during this year, I found it excessive that my will was directed exclusively towards myself. My experience of cold and Germanic rationalism led me to no longer consider my artworks as works independent from one another, but as an ensemble capable of being associated with society. And I wanted to engage myself more concretely in life.

Sugai's style changed drastically after 1962. He abandoned informel-style materiality for matte, crisp surfaces, which ultimately led to his adoption of acrylic paint. The vaguely calligraphic signs that filled the canvases of the late 1950s were replaced by clearly-delineated geometric forms. He also began working on more monumental formats.

A significant catalyst in the development of this new, hard-edge, technological aesthetic was his purchase in 1960 of a Porsche. The visual language of road signs and urban living, as well as the thrill and exhilaration of speed, would inspire Sugai for the rest of his life. Between 1964 and 1968, Sugai produced about fifty works, each of which containing the word "Auto" in their titles, including Autoroute de l'après-midi, Autoroute du matin, Festival Autoroute, Autoroute au soleil.

During an interview, Sugai expressed his interest in the universality of road signs and symbols: "On the highway, road signs transmit a clear message that any driver, irrespective of nationality or culture, can grasp in a fraction of a second. In the same way, I only want to use the most direct terms [...] This is why I use basic primary colors." In an essay, the painter Ousami Keiji argued that Sugai's autoroute aesthetic allowed the artist to break away from the stereotypes of japonisme in order to impose his own identity.

In 1967, Sugai and his wife suffered a major car accident while driving at extremely high speeds. While neither were killed, Sugai broke his neck and was hospitalized in Paris. However, this did not keep the artist from getting back on the road, and he soon purchased another Porsche. To aid him in his return to the studio, he hired an assistant, who began helping the artist prepare for his exhibition at the Japanese Pavilion of the Venice Biennale in 1968.

In 1969, Sugai returned to Japan after 18 years of absence, having been commissioned to create a 16-meter long, 3.6 meter high mural in the entryway of the National Museum of Modern Art, Tokyo. Entitled Festival of Tokyo, the mural was the largest work the artist created during his career. Two solo exhibitions in Tokyo and Kyoto were held during his brief stay in Japan, his first ever solo exhibitions in his home country.

From the 1970s onwards, Sugai began working in series, and in 1977 he began focusing mainly on the production of lithographs. He regularly returned to Japan where a large number of retrospectives of his work were held.

In 1981, he created artworks with his longtime friend, the poet Makoto Ōoka. At the occasion of an important retrospective organized in 1983 at the Seibu Museum of Art, Tokyo, the artist and poet reunited to create a work 10 meters long and 1.3 meters high, composed around an illustrated poem.

Sugai was regularly featured in international exhibitions from the 1960s onwards and received numerous prizes. These include the Grand Prix at the 1961 Grenchen International Triennial of Color Printing, the Grand Prix at the 1965 Krakow International Print Biennial, and the Prix d'honneur at the 1972 International Print Biennial in Norway.

In 1996, Sugai returned to Japan to receive the Shiju-Hosho prize, awarded by the Emperor of Japan to individuals with high cultural merit. He died Kobe on May 14 of that same year.

== Collections and Selected Exhibitions ==
Sugai's work has been collected by numerous international institutions, including: the Metropolitan Museum of Art, the Solomon R. Guggenheim Museum, the Museum of Fine Arts Boston, the Carnegie Museum of Art, the Art Institute of Chicago, the Brooklyn Museum, the Los Angeles County Museum of Art, the San Francisco Museum of Modern Art, the Walker Art Center, the Victoria and Albert Museum, the Centre Georges Pompidou, the National Museum, Oslo, the Boymans-Van Beuningen Museum, the Neue Nationalgalerie, the Gothenburg Museum of Art, the National Museum of Modern Art, Tokyo, the Bridgestone Museum of Art, the National Museum of Art, Osaka, the National Museum of Modern Art, Kyoto, the Museum of Modern Art, Toyama, the Yokohama Museum of Art, the Hyogo Prefectural Museum of Art, Kobe, and the Shizuoka Prefectural Museum of Art.

=== Selected solo exhibitions ===
- 1954: Galerie Craven, Paris
- 1959, 1960, 1961, 1962, 1964 : Kootz Gallery, New York
- 1960: Städtisches Museum, Leverkusen
- 1967: National Gallery, Oslo
- 1969: National Art Museum, Kyoto
- 1976: Maison de la Culture, Orléans
- 1977: Umeda Museum of Art, Osaka
- 1983: Retrospective Exhibition 1952-1983, Seibu Museum of Art, Tokyo
- 1988: Galerie Brusberg, Berlin
- 1990: Galerie Artcurial, Paris
- 1992: Ohara Museum of Art, Kurashiki
- 1997: Travelling exhibition of prints (1955-1995) throughout Japan: Takamatsu, Hamamatsu, Machida, Tendo, Kaga, Ashiya
- 1999: Kumi Sugaï, les plus grands tableaux de ses dernières années, Japanese cultural House in Paris (French: Maison de la culture du Japon à Paris), Paris, France
- 2000: Kumi Sugai, Museum of Contemporary Art, Tokyo
- 2019: Kumi Sugai: The Eternal Challenger, Umi-Mori Art Museum, Hiroshima

=== Selected group exhibitions ===
- 1953: Octobre, Galerie Craven, Paris
- 1955, 1958, 1961, 1964: Carnegie International Exhibition, Pittsburgh
- 1959 and 1964: documenta Kassel, West Germany
- 1959 and 1965: Bienal de São Paulo
- 1962: École de Paris, Tate Gallery, London
- 1964: Painting and Sculpture of the Decade, Tate Gallery, London
- 1966: The New Japanese Painting and Sculpture, MoMA, New York
- 1967: Participation in the French Pavilion at the Exposition Internationale of Montreal
- 1968: Painting in France 1900-1967, National Gallery of Art, Washington D.C.
- 1969: Contemporary Art: Dialogue between the East and the West, National Museum of Modern Art, Tokyo
- 1970: Participation in Expo '70, Osaka
- 1979: Contemporary Art/Postwar, Museum of Modern Art, Kamakura
- 1986: Japon des avant-gardes, Centre Pompidou, Paris
- 2022: Modernités cosmiques, Fondation Vaserely, Aix-en-Provence
