= 31st Venice Biennale =

- Genre: Art exhibition
- Begins: 1962
- Ends: 1962
- Location: Venice
- Country: Italy
- Previous event: 30th Venice Biennale (1960)
- Next event: 32nd Venice Biennale (1964)

The 31st Venice Biennale, held in 1962, was an exhibition of international contemporary art, with 33 participating nations. The Venice Biennale takes place biennially in Venice, Italy. Winners of the Gran Premi (Grand Prize) included French painter Alfred Manessier, Swiss sculptor Alberto Giacometti, Argentine etcher Antonio Berni, and Italians painter Giuseppe Gapogrossi ex aequo with Ennio Morlotti, sculptor Aldo Calò ex aequo with Umberto Milani, and etcher Antonino Virduzzo.

== Bibliography ==
- Di Martino, Enzo (2005). The History of the Venice Biennale 1895–2005. Venice: Papiro Arte. ISBN 978-88-901104-4-3. OCLC 62237064.
