= Tokyo Bay Fortress =

Group of coastal fortifications

- Tokyo Bay, Japan
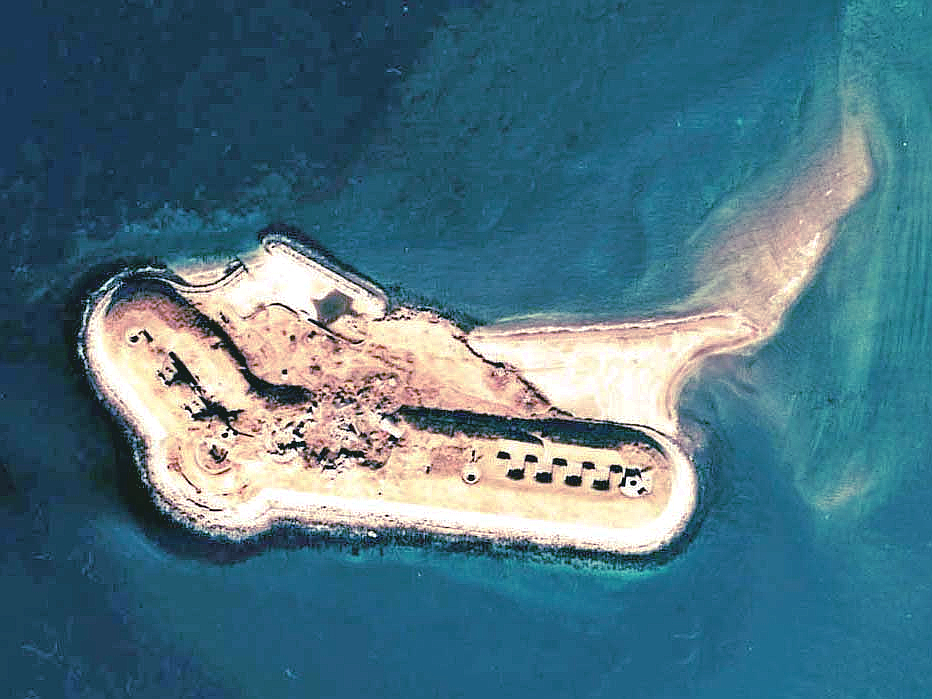
- No.1 Kaiho(1974)

Site information
- Type: Defensive fortification
- Controlled by: Empire of Japan
- Condition: ruins

Site history
- Built: 1884–1945
- Materials: Concrete; Wood; Steel
- Demolished: 1946
- Battles/wars: World War II

Garrison information
- Occupants: Imperial Japanese Army

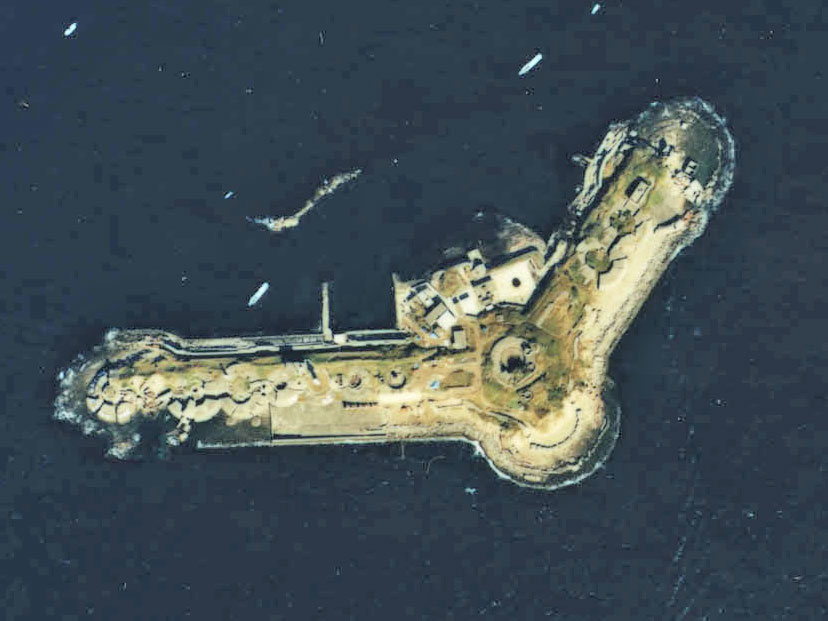
No.2 Kaiho(1988)

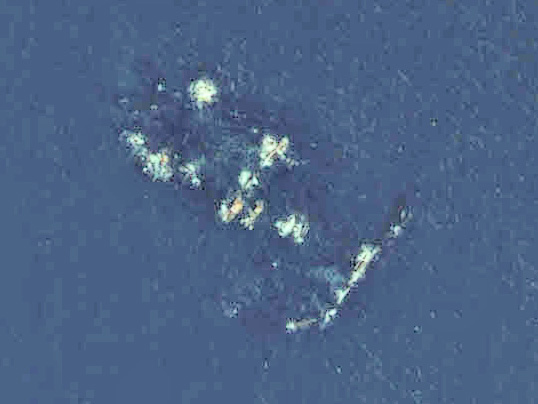
No.3 Kaiho(1983)

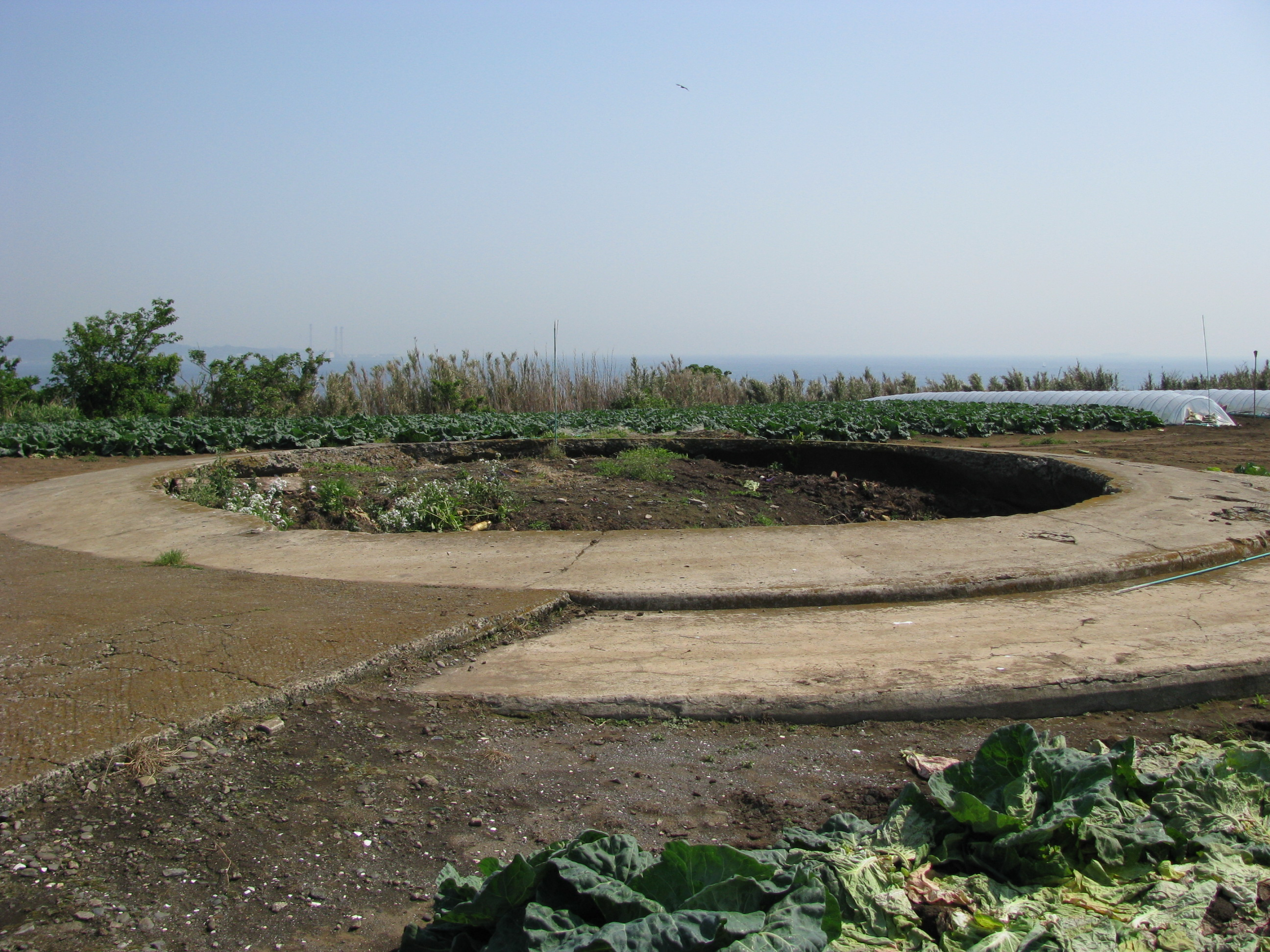
Kenzaki Battery(2010)

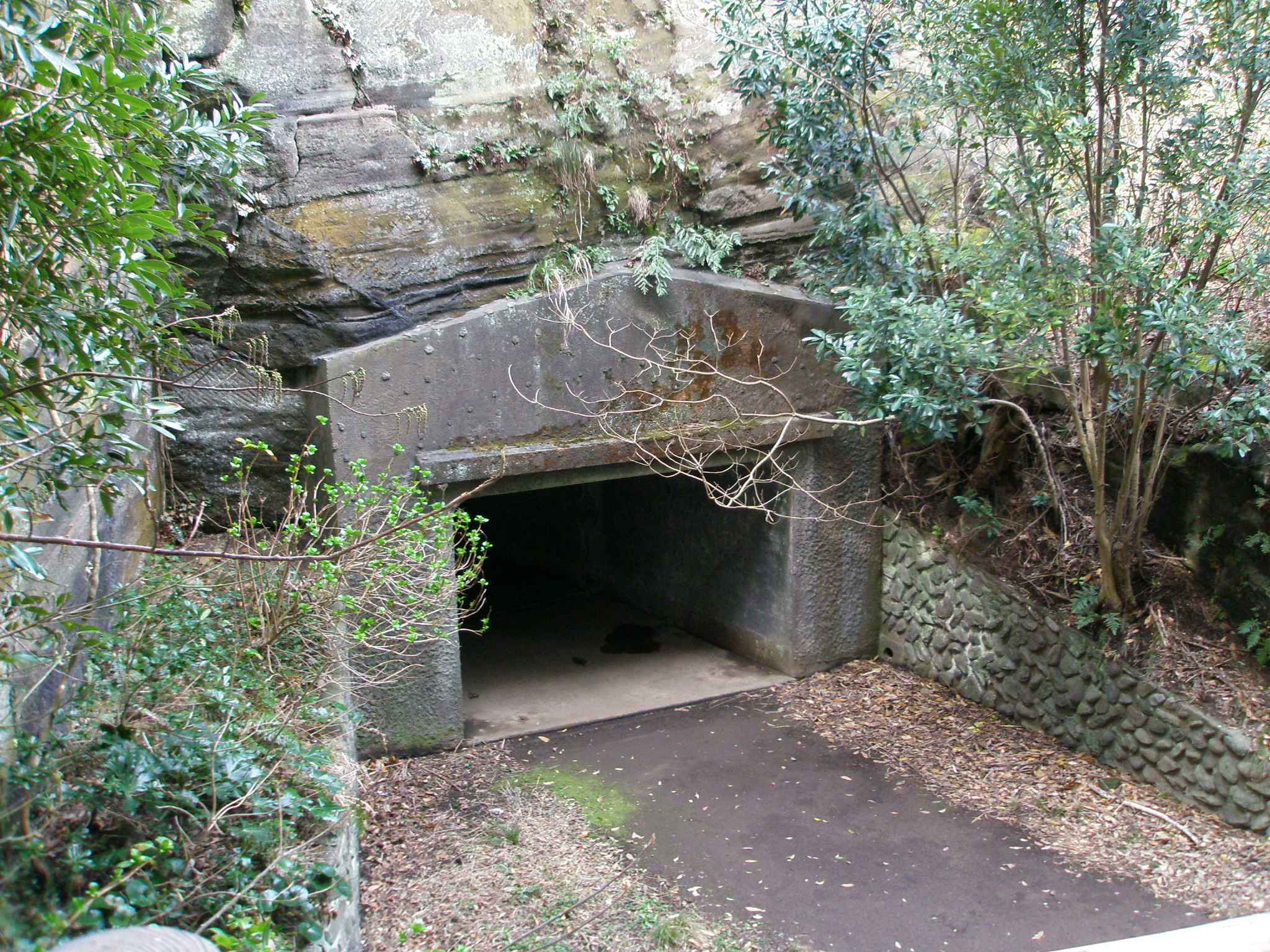
Cape Ofusa Battery(2007)

Tokyo Bay Fortress (東京湾要塞, Tokyo-wan yosai) was the name of a group of coastal fortifications built to guard the entrance to Tokyo Bay and thus the city of Tokyo from attack from the sea. These gun batteries and fortifications ceased to be used after the end of World War II.

== History ==
A series of six island fortresses (daiba) constructed in 1853 by Egawa Hidetatsu for the Tokugawa shogunate in order to protect Edo from attack by sea, the primary threat being Commodore Matthew Perry's Black Ships which had arrived in the same year to force Japan to end its centuries-old national isolation policy Of the originally planned 11 batteries, seven were started construction but only six were ever finished, one of which was the artificial island of Odaiba.

After the Meiji restoration, the primary threats to the new Empire of Japan were perceived to be Qing China's Beiyang fleet, followed by the Russian Empire's Pacific Fleet. The Meiji government ordered the construction of a new set of coastal fortifications starting in 1884. The main facilities were constructed on the western coast of the Boso Peninsula from Cape Susaki in Tateyama to Cape Futtsu in Futtsu, Chiba Prefecture and from Jogashima at the southern tip of the Miura Peninsula to the Uraga Channel at the mouth of Tokyo Bay and extending to Natsushima in the city of Yokosuka in Kanagawa Prefecture. The Tokyo Bay Garrison Command was established in 1894. It was renamed the Tokyo Bay Fortress Command in 1895 and was headquartered at Yokosuka.

Many of the 28-cm howitzers installed in the gun emplacements around Tokyo Bay Fortress were removed during the Russo-Japanese War and were deployed to the Siege of Port Arthur, where they were deployed to devastating effect against the Russian Pacific Fleet. From the 1920s and 1930s, many surplus guns of the Imperial Japanese Navy, such as the 12-in main battery of the battleship Aki which had been made available due to the reduction of capital warships per the London Naval Treaty and the Washington Naval Treaty, were reused in these coastal artillery installations.

An important feature of the Tokyo Bay Fortress was a series of three artificial islands built between Cape Futtsu and Cape Kannonzaki at the entrance to Tokyo Bay in the 1910s. Equipped with 15-cm guns, this enabled the Tokyo Bay Fortress to cover the entire span of Tokyo Bay within firing ranges and provided a second line of defense against any ships which might have breached the gun emplacements at the entrance to Tokyo Bay. The third of these islands (the one closest to Cape Kannonzaki) was rendered unusable by land subsidence caused by the 1923 Great Kantō earthquake. It remnants posed an ongoing threat to navigation, and were removed from 2000 to 2007.

All fortifications were dismantled at the end of World War II; however, the remains of the Sarushima Battery and Chiyogasaki Battery were designated as National Historic Sites of Japan on March 10, 2015. This was the first instance of post-Meiji period military-facilities receiving this designation.

== Components of the Tokyo Bay Fortress ==
=== Around Yokosuka ===
- Natsushima Battery
- Sasayama Battery
- Hakozaki Battery
- Hashima Battery
- Yonegahama Battery
- Sarushima Battery (National Historic Site)
- No.3 Kaiho

=== Miura Peninsula ===
- Jogashima Battery
- Sendasaki Battery
- Chiyogasaki Battery (National Historic Site)
- Kannonzaki Battery
- Misaki Battery
- Tsurugizaki Battery
- Kinugasa Ammunition Main Magazine
- Oyabe Magazine

=== Boso Peninsula ===
- No.1 Kaiho
- No.2 Kaiho
- Futtsu Motosu Fort Battery
- Kanaya Battery
- Cape Taifusa Battery
- Susaki 1st Battery
- Suzaki 2nd Battery
- Tateyama Navy Air Corps

== See also ==
- Army of Tokyo Bay
- Eastern District Army (Japan)
- First General Army (Japan)
