= Tokyo Bay =

Bay in Kantō region, Japan

- 東京湾 (Tōkyō-wan)
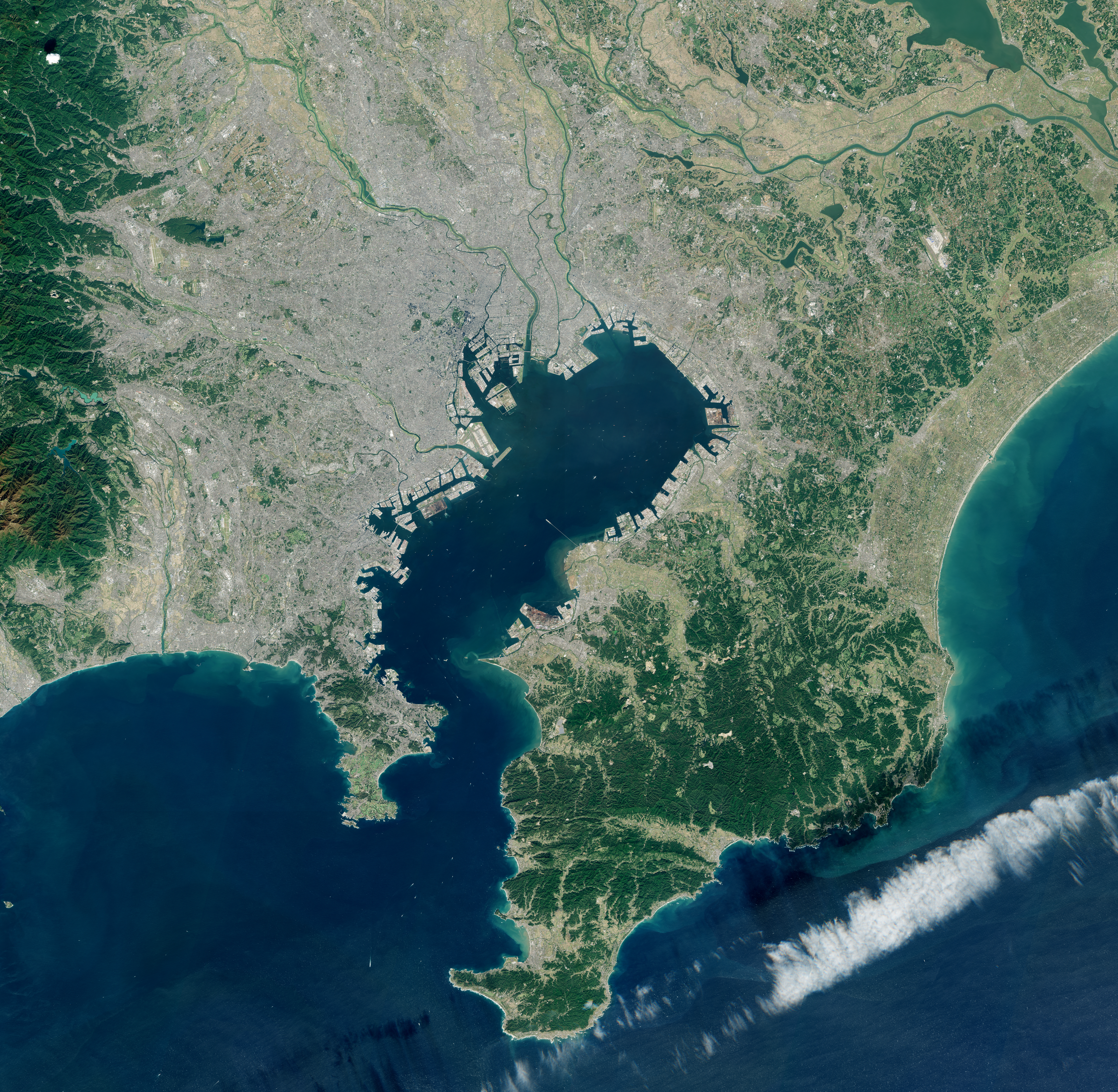
- ESA Sentinel-2 image of Tokyo Bay

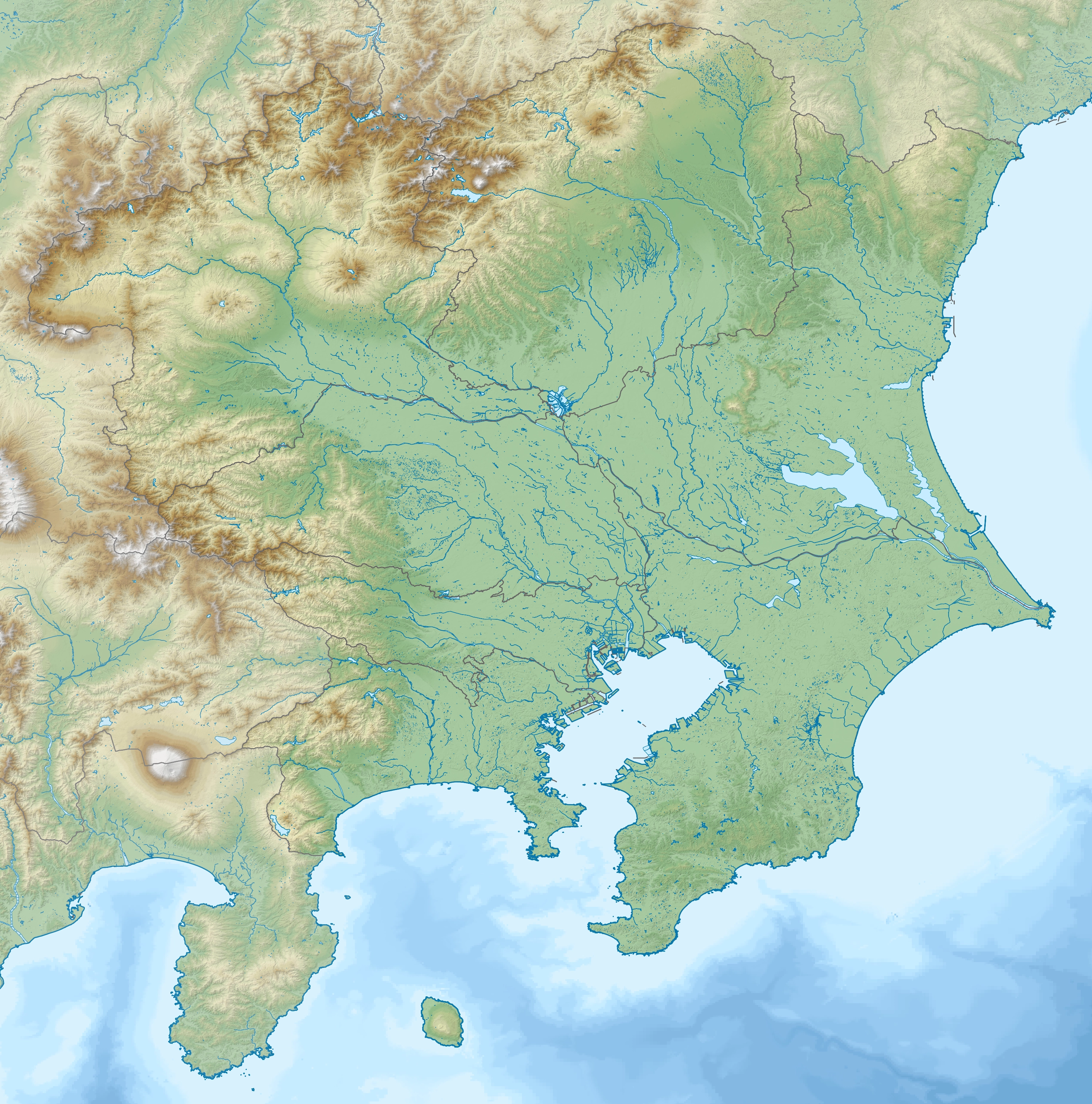
- Location of Tokyo Bay
- Location: Honshu, Japan
- Coordinates: 35°31′21″N 139°54′36″E
- River sources: Ara River; Edo River; Obitsu River; Yoro River
- Ocean/sea sources: Pacific Ocean
- Basin countries: Japan
- Surface area: 1,500 km^{2} (580 mi^{2})
- Average depth: 40 m (130 ft)
- Max. depth: 70 m (230 ft)
- Islands: Sarushima

Tokyo Bay (東京湾, Tōkyō-wan) is a bay located in the southern Kantō region of Japan spanning the coasts of Tokyo, Kanagawa Prefecture, and Chiba Prefecture, on the southern coast of the island of Honshu. Tokyo Bay is connected to the Pacific Ocean by the Uraga Channel. The Tokyo Bay region is the most populous and the largest industrialized area in Japan.

== Names ==
In ancient times, the Japanese knew Tokyo Bay as the uchi-umi (内海) , which means "inner sea". By the Azuchi–Momoyama period (1568–1600) the area had become known as Edo Bay (江戸湾, Edo-wan) after the city of Edo. The bay took its present name in modern times, after the Imperial court moved to Edo and renamed the city Tokyo in 1868.

== Geography ==
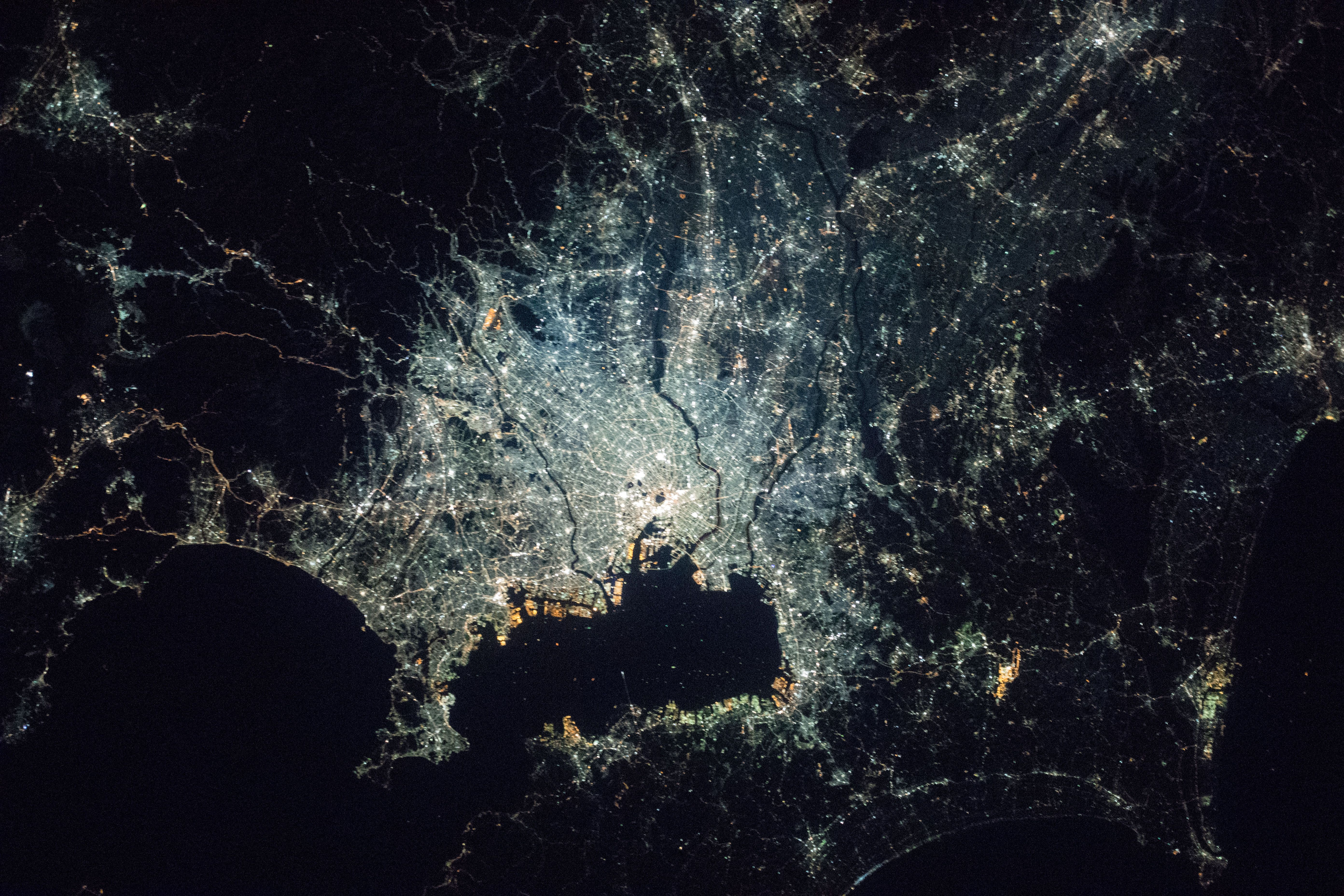
Tokyo Bay and Greater Tokyo at night (2018)

Tokyo Bay juts prominently into the Kantō Plain. It is surrounded by the Bōsō Peninsula in Chiba Prefecture to the east and the Miura Peninsula in Kanagawa Prefecture to the west. The shore of Tokyo Bay consists of a diluvial plateau and is subject to rapid marine erosion. Sediments on the shore of the bay make for a smooth, continuous shoreline.

=== Boundaries ===
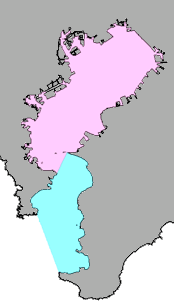
Tokyo Bay, in a narrow sense (pink) and in a broad sense (pink and blue)

In a narrow sense, Tokyo Bay is the area north of the straight line from Cape Kannon on the west of Miura Peninsula to Cape Futtsu on the east Bōsō Peninsula. This area covers about 922 km^{2} (356 mi^{2}) in 2012, reclamation projects continue to slowly shrink the bay.

In a broader sense, Tokyo Bay includes the Uraga Channel. By this definition the bay opens from an area north of the straight line from Cape Tsurugisaki on the east of Miura Peninsula to Cape Sunosaki on the west of the Boso Peninsula. This area covers about 1,100 km^{2} (420 mi^{2}). The area of Tokyo Bay combined with the Uraga Channel covers 1,500 km^{2} (580 mi^{2}).

=== Depth ===
The shoal between Cape Futtsu in Chiba Prefecture and Cape Honmaku in Yokohama is known as Nakanose, and has a depth of 20 m (66 ft). North of this area the bay has a depth of 40 m (130 ft) and an uncomplicated underwater topography. Areas south of Nakanose are significantly deeper moving towards the Pacific Ocean.

=== Islands ===
The only natural island in Tokyo Bay is Sarushima (0.055 km^{2} (0.021 mi^{2})) at Yokosuka, Kanagawa Prefecture. Sarushima was one of the locations fortified with coastal artillery during the Bakumatsu period and was subsequently incorporated into the Tokyo Bay Fortress during the Meiji period. The Imperial Japanese Navy maintained a degaussing station on the island until the end of World War II. The island is now uninhabited and is a marine park.

Many artificial islands were built as naval fortifications in the Meiji and Taishō periods. After World War II these islands were converted to residential or recreational use. Odaiba, also known as Daiba, was one of six artificial islands constructed in 1853 as a fortification to protect the Tokugawa shogunate at Edo, and was known as the Shinagawa Daiba. After World War II Odaiba was incorporated into Tokyo and redeveloped for commercial and recreational use. Before World War II, Yumenoshima was planned as an airfield (one of the largest in the world at the time), but after the US military expansion of Haneda Airport following World War II, the plan of the airfield fell through. The island briefly opened as a public beach before being repurposed and used as a landfill between 1957 and 1967 to dispose of the large quantities of garbage from the Tokyo Metropolitan Area. The reclaimed land now hosts Yumenoshima Park with numerous recreational facilities. Hakkei Island (0.24 km^{2} (0.093 mi^{2})), formerly Landfill Number 14, was constructed in 1985 and is home to Yokohama Hakkeijima Sea Paradise. Other artificial islands include Heiwa, Katsushima, Shōwa, Keihin, and Higashiōgi islands.

=== Rivers ===
Numerous rivers empty into Tokyo Bay, and all provide water for residential and industrial areas along the bay. The Tama and Sumida rivers empty into the bay at Tokyo. The Edo River empties into Tokyo Bay between Tokyo and Chiba Prefecture. The Obitsu and Yōrō rivers empty into the bay in Chiba Prefecture.

=== Land reclamation ===
Land reclamation has been carried out along the coast of Tokyo Bay since the Meiji period. Areas along the shore with a depth of less than 5 m (16 ft) are simplest to carry out landfill, and sand from the floor of Tokyo Bay is used for these projects. The topography of the shoreline of Tokyo Bay differs greatly from that of the pre-modern period due to ongoing land reclamation projects. Tokyo Bay includes about 249 km^{2} (96 mi^{2}) of reclaimed land area in 2012. Aggregate household waste production is enormous in Greater Tokyo, there is little room for traditional garbage disposal sites; waste is rigorously sorted at the household, much of it is turned into ash and further recycled into bay landfill.

=== Bridges ===
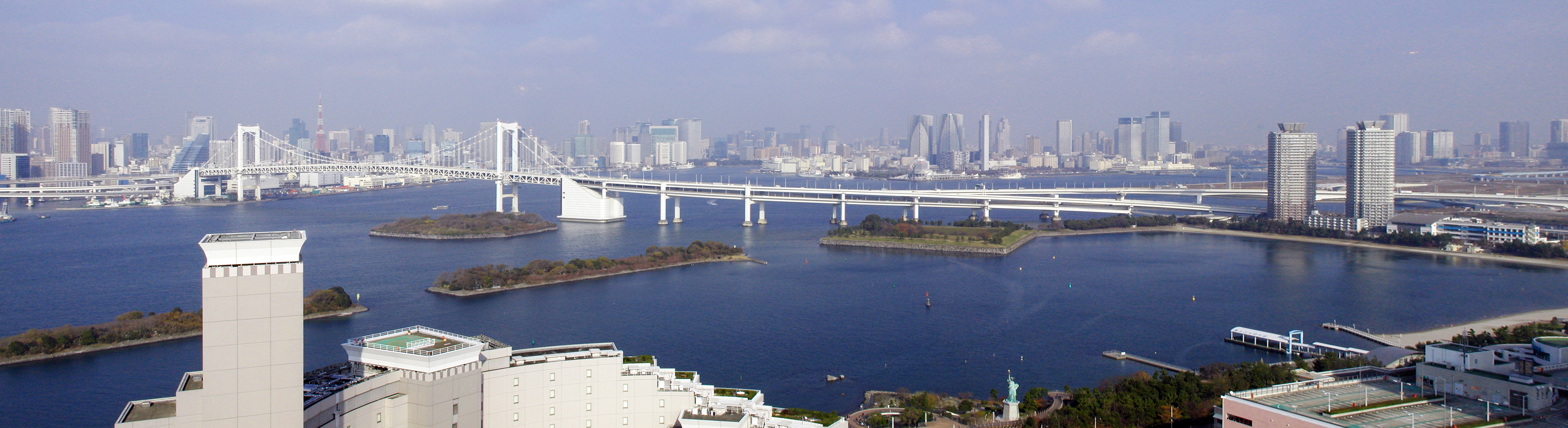
A panoramic view of northern Tokyo Bay facing Tokyo from Odaiba island

The Tokyo Bay Aqua-Line bridge–tunnel crosses Tokyo Bay between Kawasaki and Kisarazu; Tokyo-Wan Ferry also crosses the bay toward the Uraga Channel between Kurihama (in Yokosuka) and Kanaya (in Futtsu on the Chiba side).

== Development ==
=== Fishing ===
Tokyo Bay was a historical center of the fishing industry, a source of shellfish, and other aquaculture. These industries decreased with the industrialization of the Tokyo Bay region early in the 20th century, and almost completely ceased with the construction of the Keihin and Keiyō industrial zones directly after World War II.

=== Ports ===
A number of Japan's most important ports are located in Tokyo Bay. The Port of Yokohama, the Port of Chiba, the Port of Tokyo, the Port of Kawasaki, the Port of Yokosuka, the Port of Kisarazu, rank not only as the busiest ports in Japan, but also in the Asia-Pacific Region.

=== Industrial zones ===
Industrial zones on Tokyo Bay were developed as early as the Meiji era (1868–1912). The Keihin Industrial Zone was built on reclaimed land in Kanagawa Prefecture to the west of Tokyo. This was expanded to the Keiyō Industrial Zone in Chiba Prefecture along the north and east coasts of Tokyo Bay after World War II. The development of the two zones has resulted in the largest industrialized area in Japan. The large-scale industrial zones of the coastal Tokyo region have caused significant air and water pollution.

=== Military facilities ===
The Port of Yokosuka contains the naval bases of the Japan Maritime Self-Defense Force and the United States Forces Japan.

== History ==
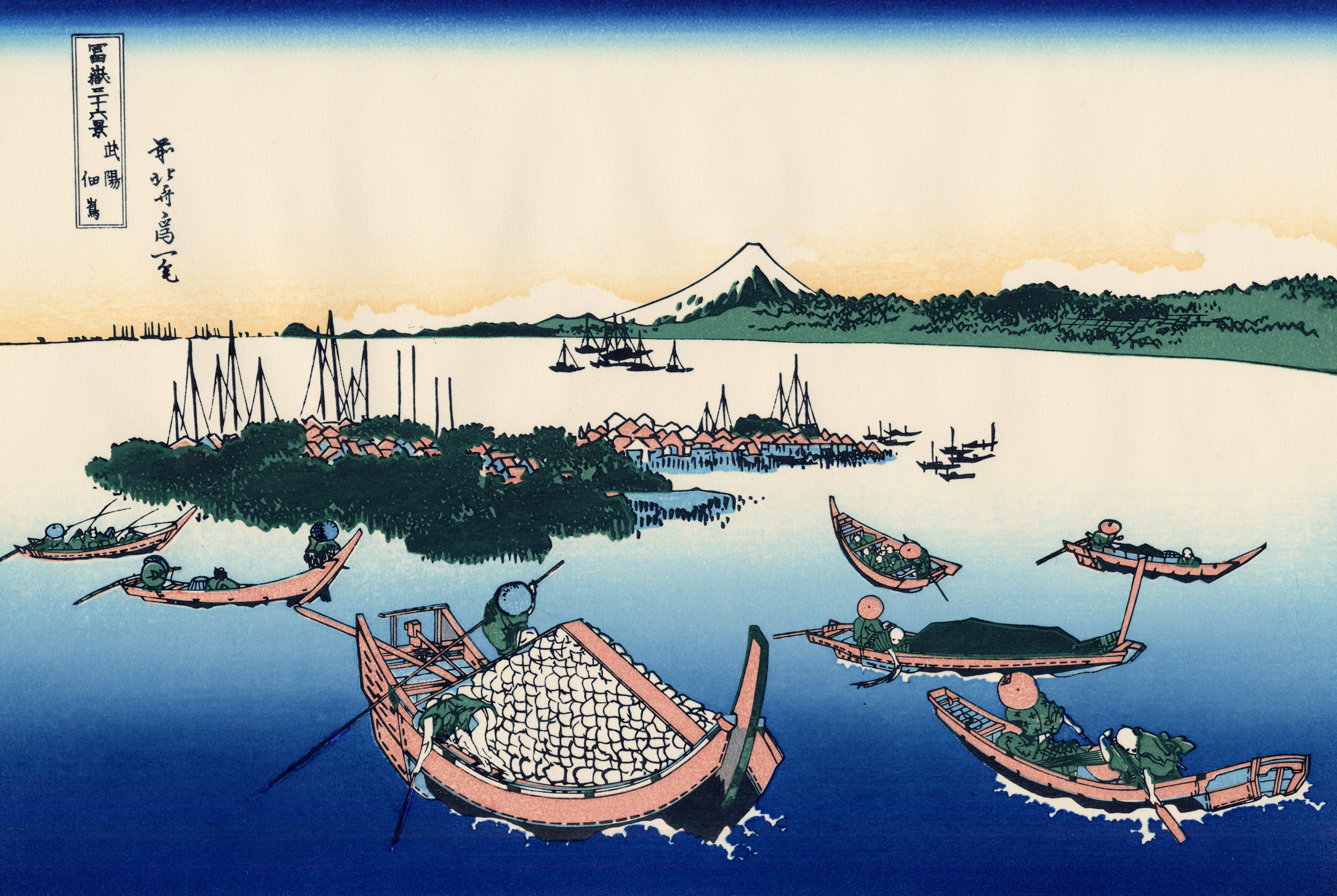
"Tsukuda Takeyo" in Katsushika Hokusai's famous picture collection "Thirty-six Views of Tomitake". In the latter half of the Edo period, you can see Mt. Fuji far from Tsukuda Island (currently Tsukuda, Chuo-ku, Tokyo) in front of Edo, which is crowded with ships.

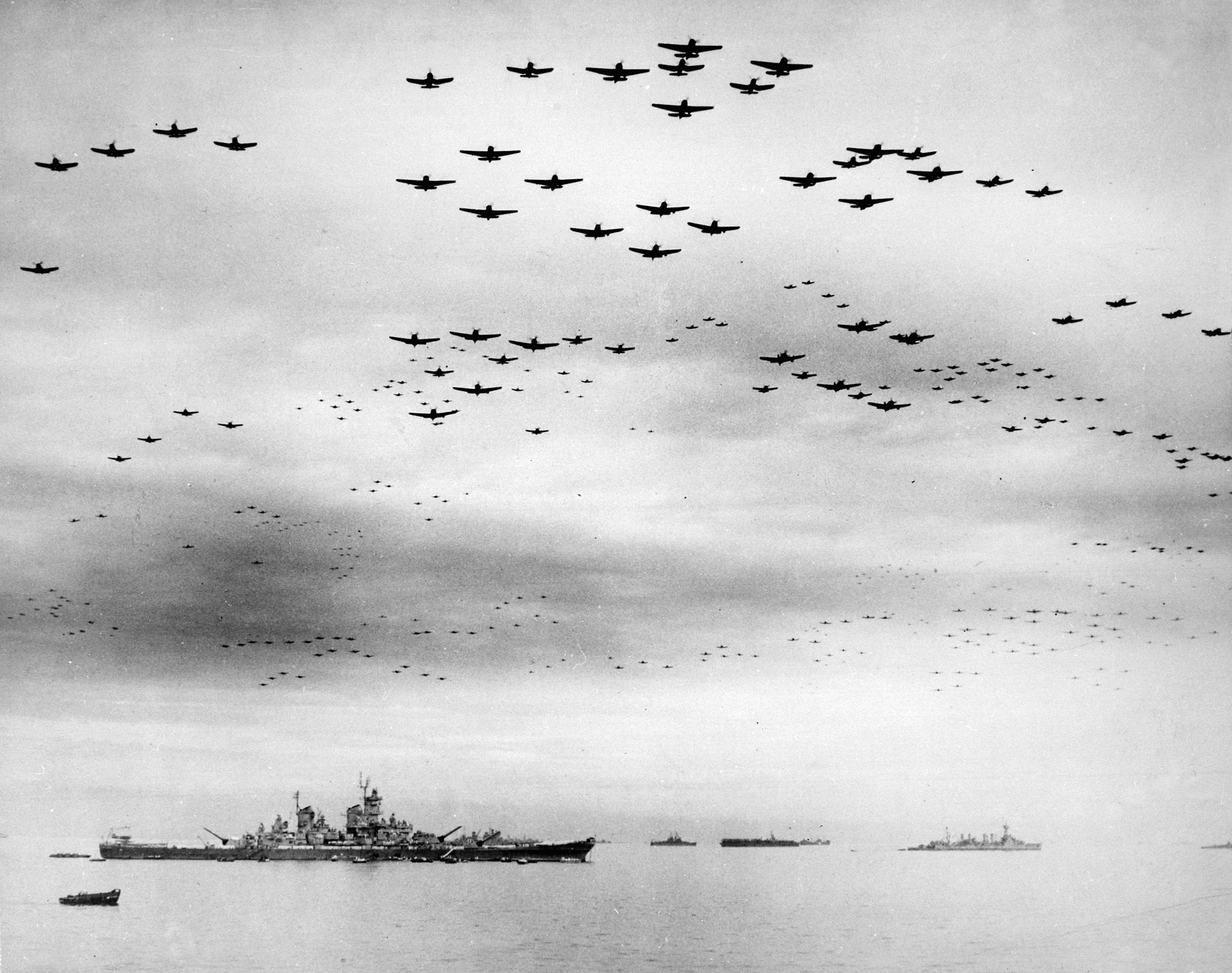
American planes over USS Missouri and Tokyo Bay, September 2, 1945

=== Perry Expedition ===
Tokyo Bay was the venue for the Perry Expedition, which involved two separate trips from 1853 to 1854 between the United States and Japan by Commodore Matthew Perry (1794–1858). Perry sailed on his four "Black Ships" into Edo Bay on July 8, 1853, and began negotiations with the Tokugawa shogunate that led to a peace and trade treaty between the United States and Japan in 1854.

=== World War II ===
The Japanese Instrument of Surrender at the end of World War II was signed on September 2, 1945, on board USS Missouri (BB-63), which was anchored at 35° 21' 17" N 139° 45' 36" E. A flag from one of Commodore Perry's ships was flown in from the Naval Academy Museum and displayed at the ceremony.

== See also ==
- Port of Tokyo
- Uraga Channel
- Miura Peninsula
- Bōsō Peninsula
- Keihin
- Keiyō
