= Sarushima =

Island off the coast of Kanagawa, Japan

Native name: 猿島 Nickname: Monkey Island
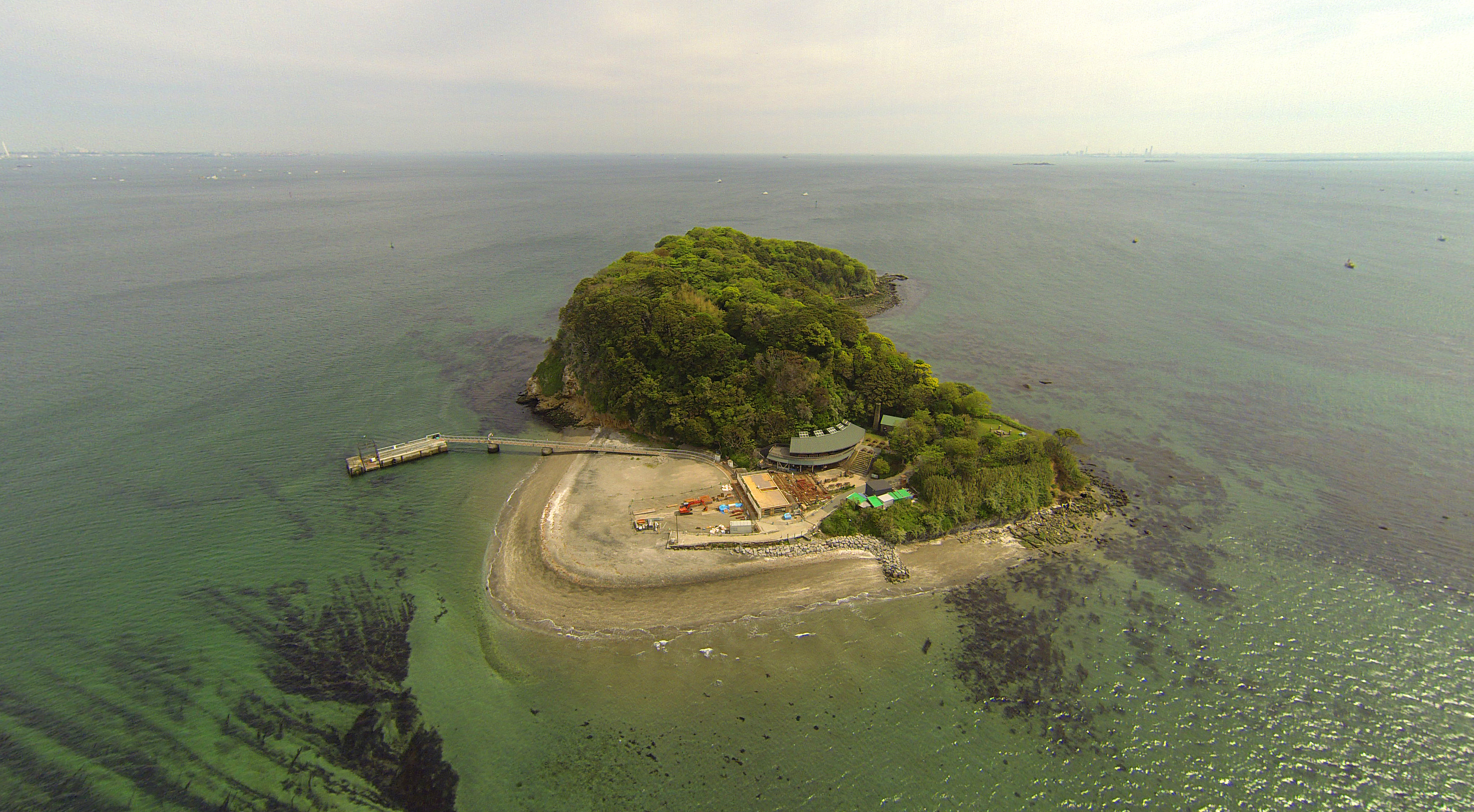
- Sarushima from the air

- Location within Tokyo Bay and Bōsō Peninsula Location within Kanagawa Prefecture

Geography
- Location: Yokosuka, Kanagawa
- Coordinates: 35°17′10″N 139°41′39″E
- Area: 0.055 km^{2} (0.021 sq mi)
- Coastline: 1.6 km (0.99 mi)
- Highest elevation: 39.3 m (128.9 ft)

Administration
- Japan

Sarushima (猿島; "Monkey Island"), is a small island located off Yokosuka, Kanagawa in Japan. It is the only natural island in Tokyo Bay. Sarushima was used as a battery by the Tokugawa shogunate during the Edo period, and after the Meiji Restoration in 1868, the island was developed as part of the Yokosuka Navy Yard.

Matthew C. Perry named the island Perry Island in 1853.

== Sarushima Park ==
Sarushima is now uninhabited, and after World War II, it was developed as a marine park. Swimming and camping facilities were built on Sarushima, which makes it a popular fishing spot. The highest part of the island is still surrounded by a stone wall from the pre-war period, and features the remains of red brick barracks and a powder magazine. The island is accessible by a ferry.

== Gallery ==
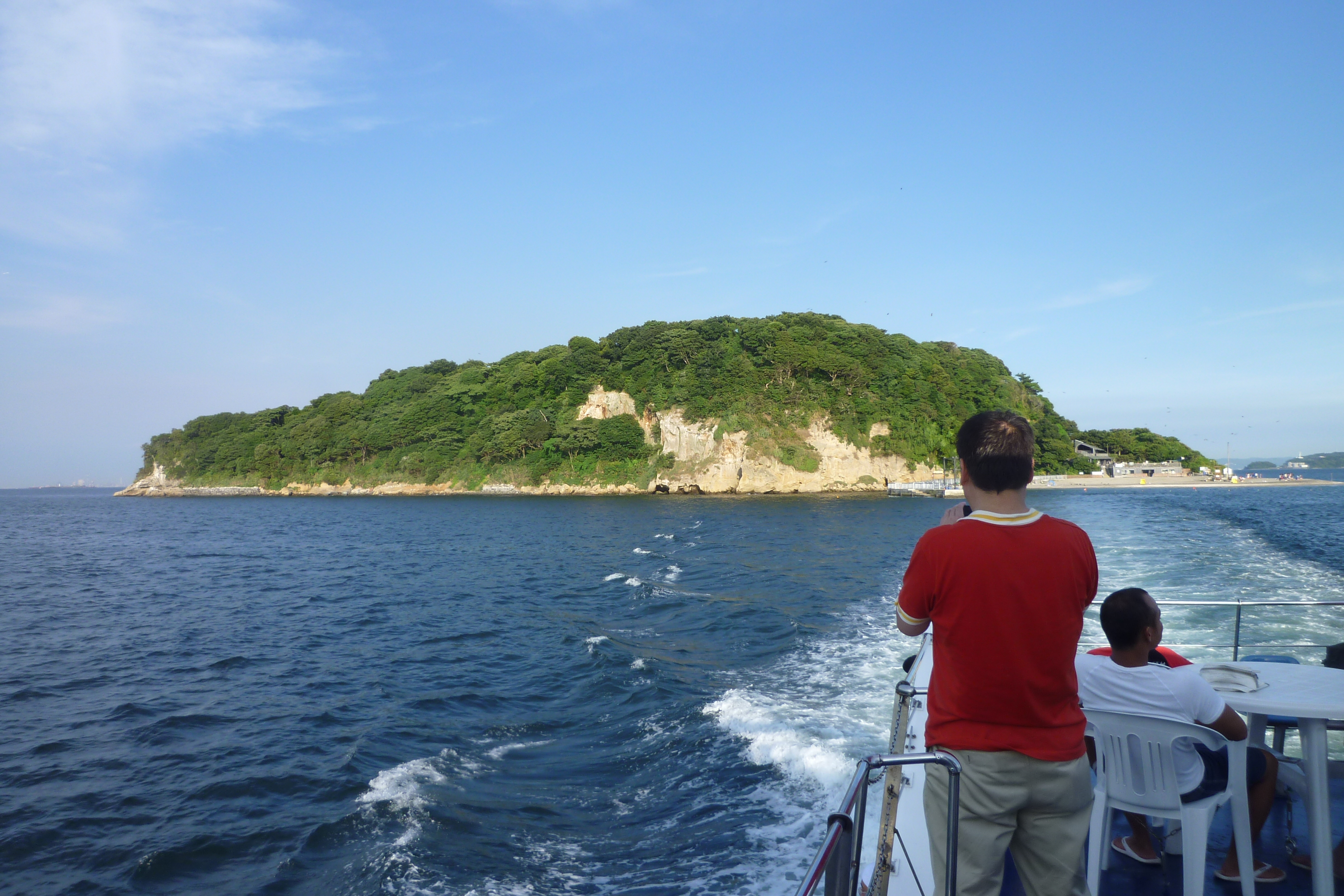
On the ferry leaving the island

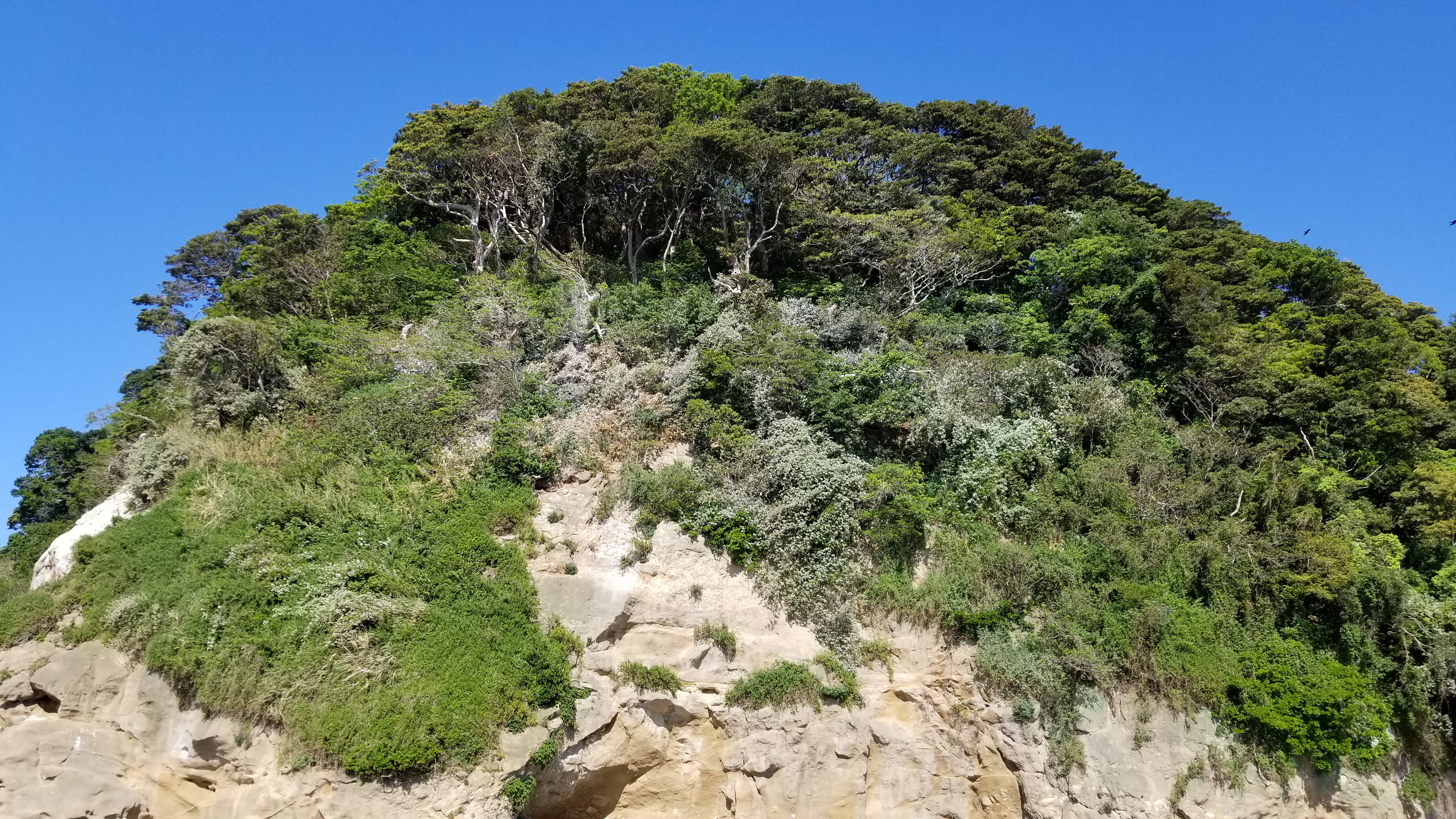
Southern Promontory

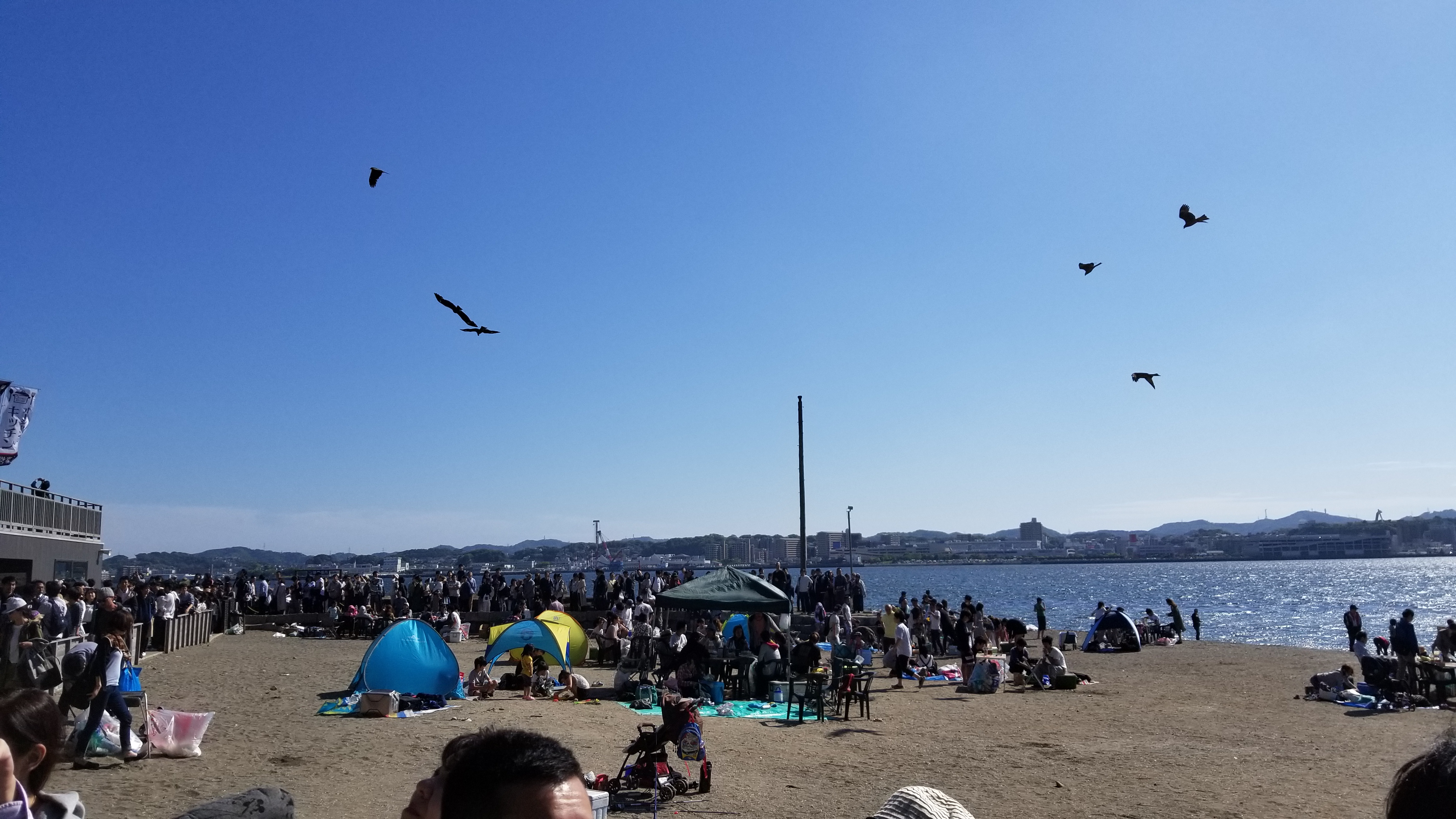
Southern Beach

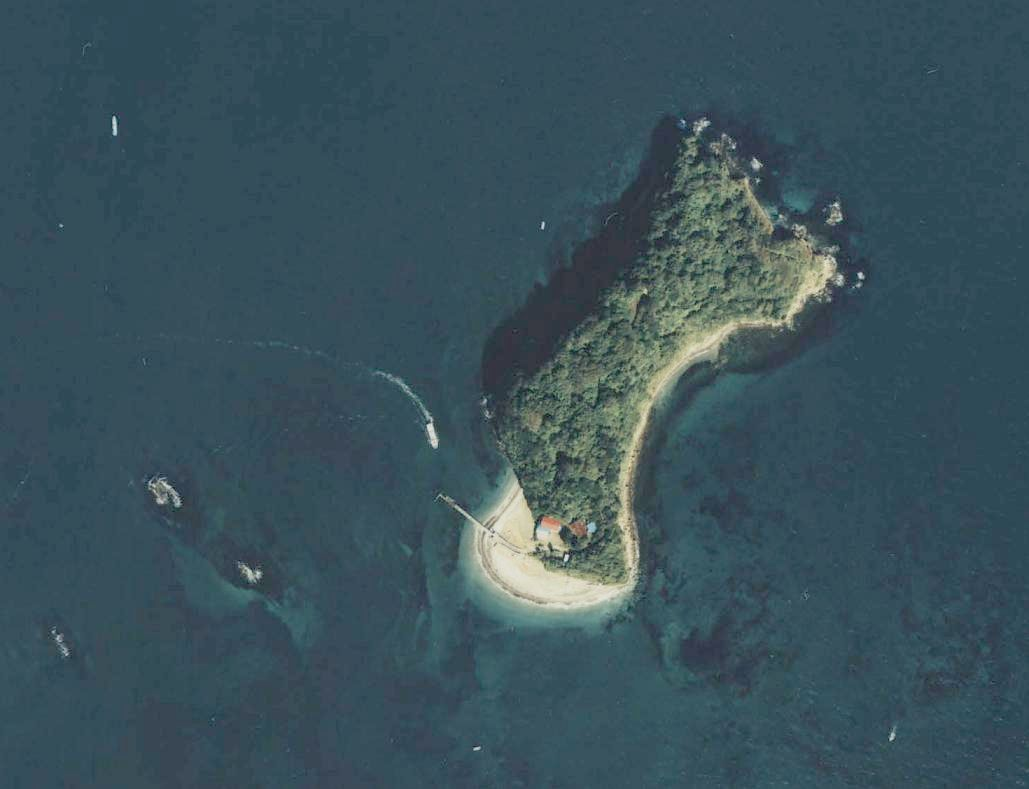
From above

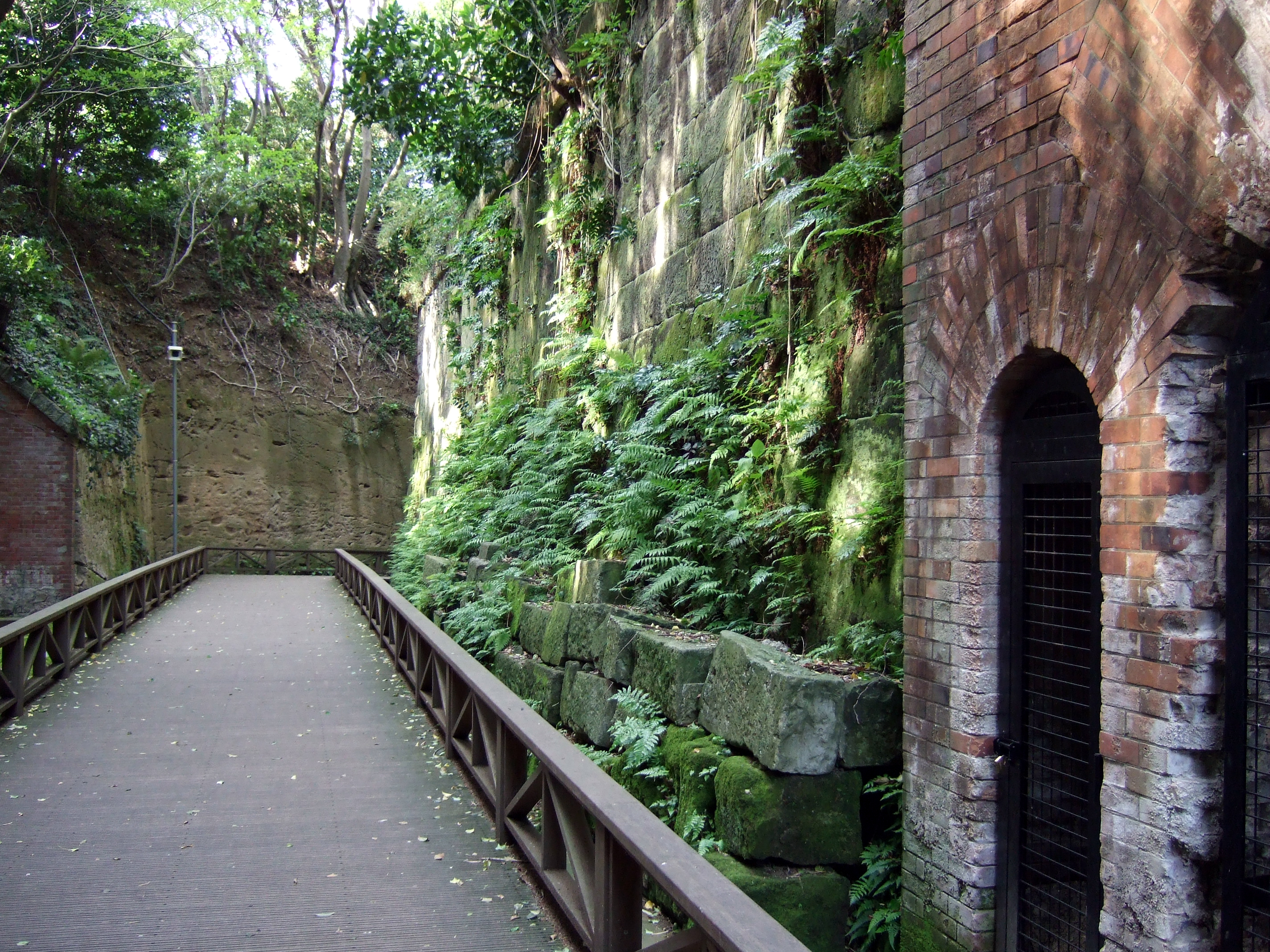
Inside the island

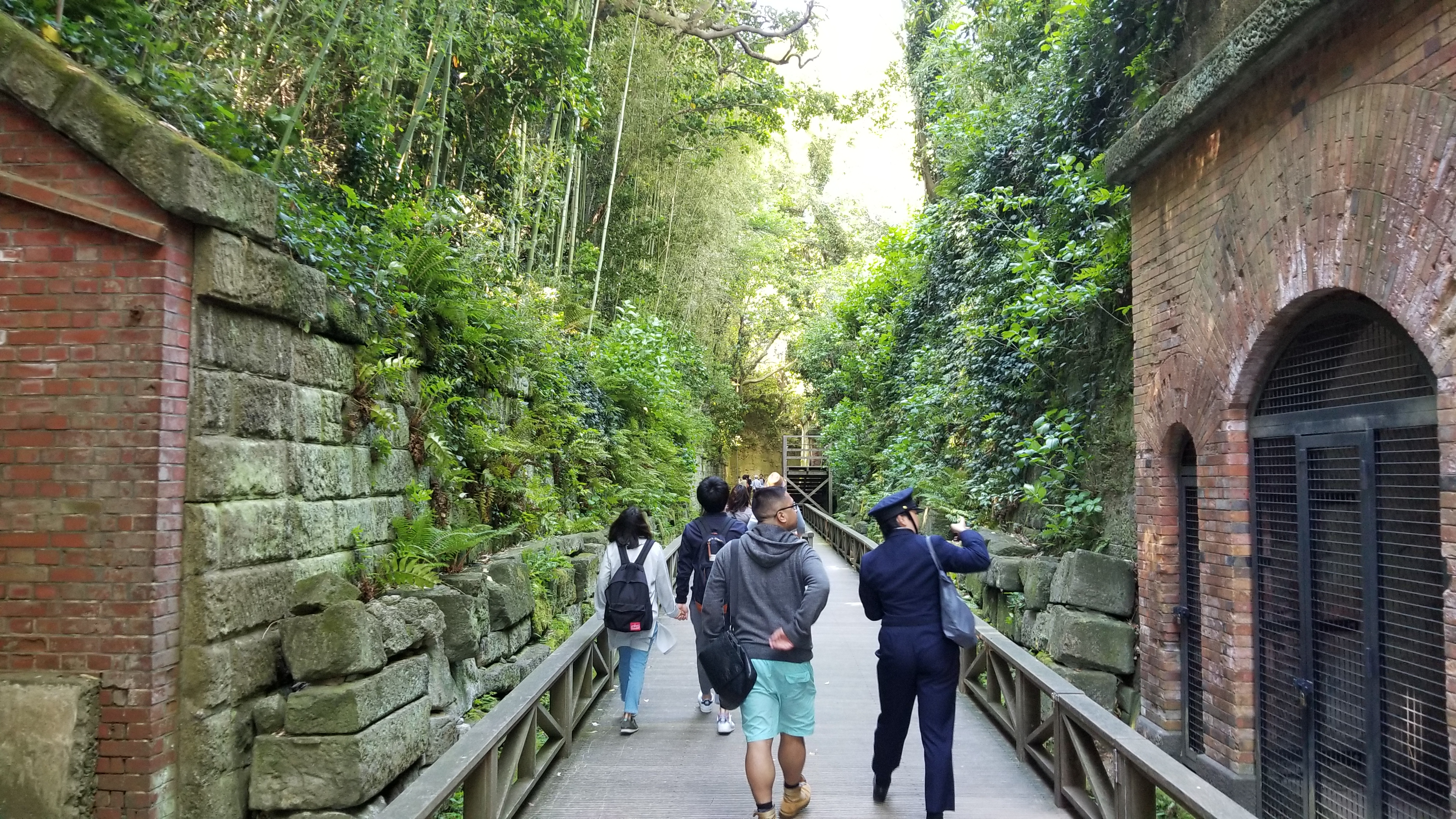
Fortified Pathway

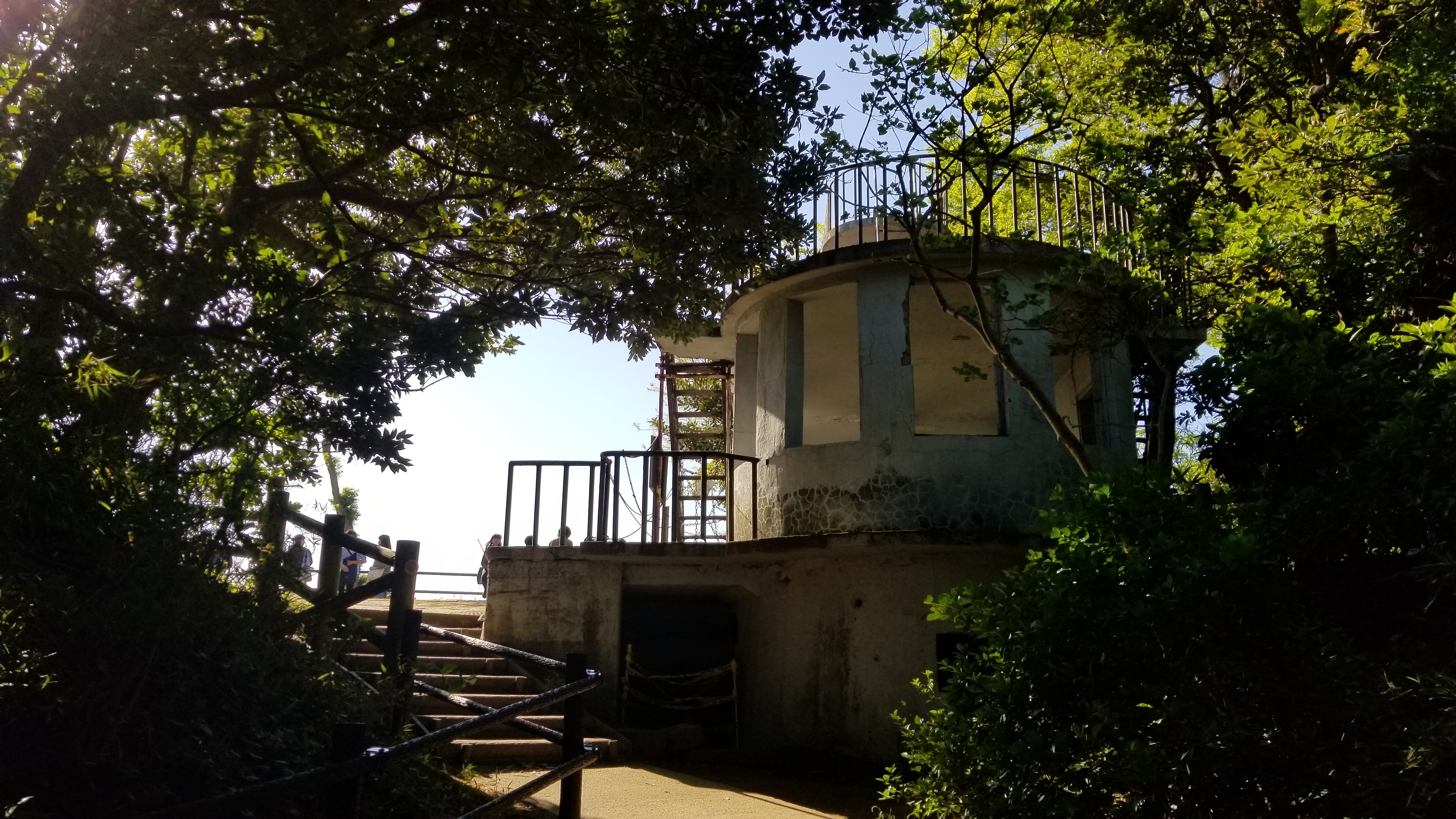
Abandoned Watchtower

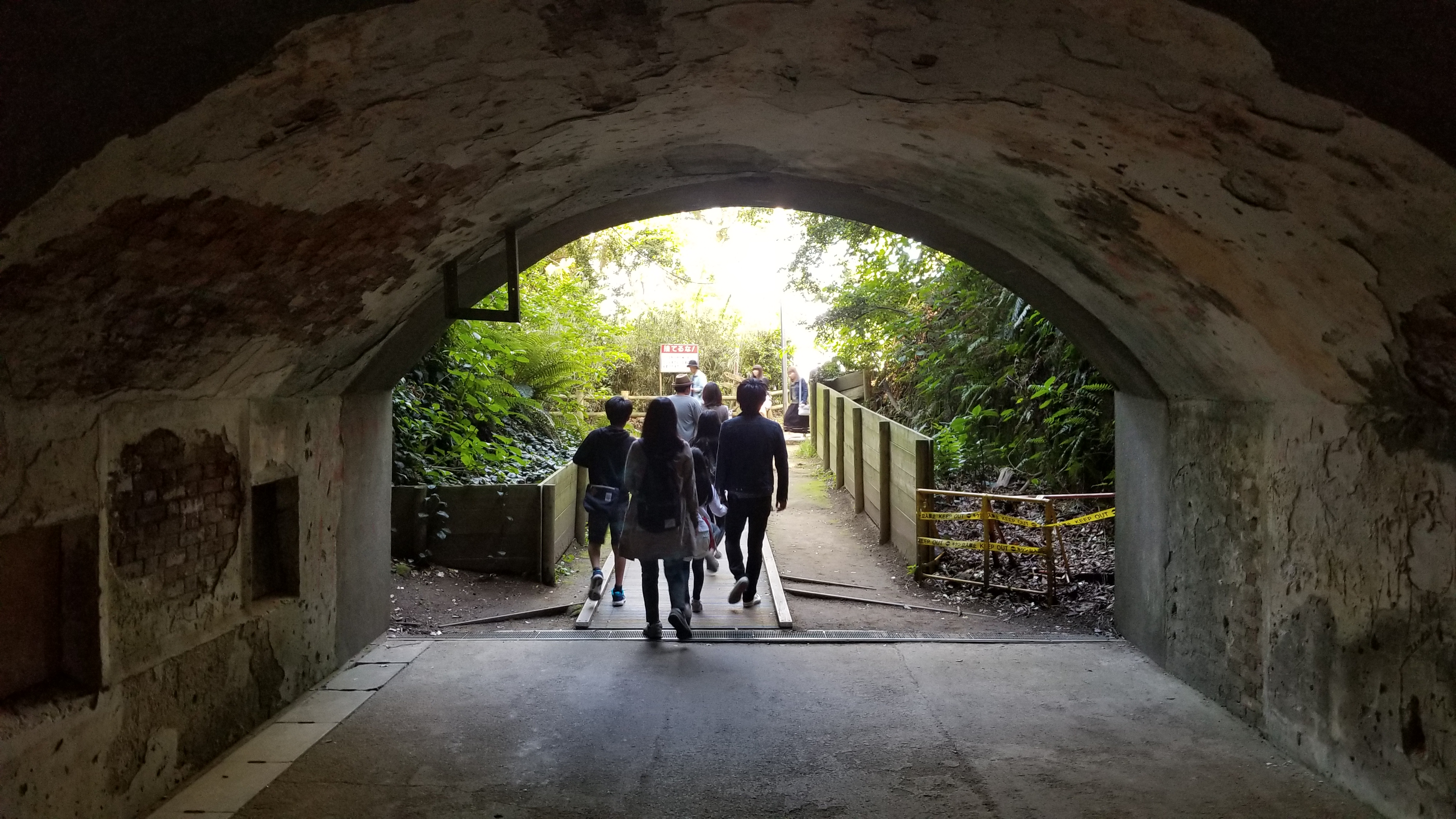
Bunker Tunnel

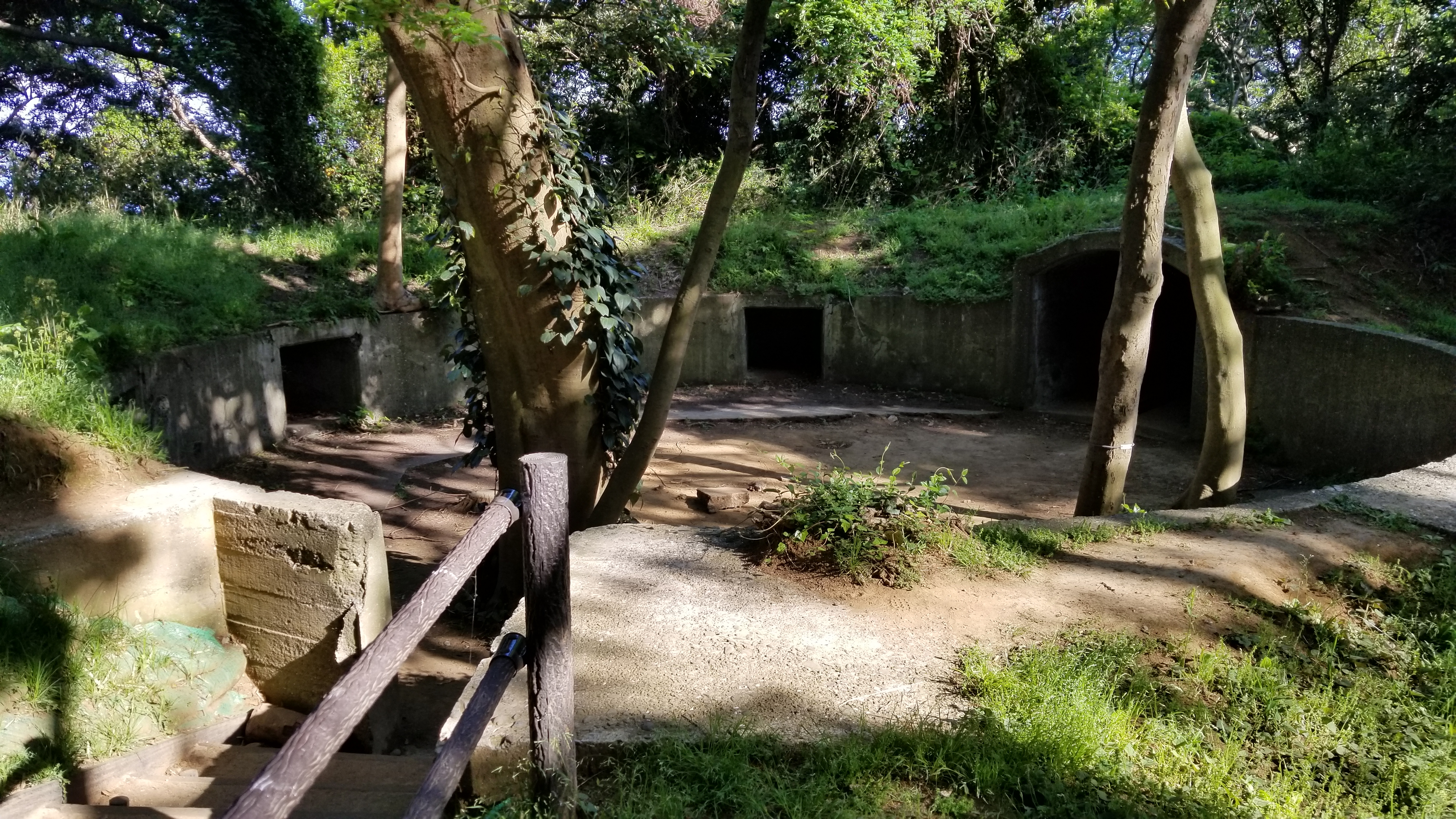
Gun Battery

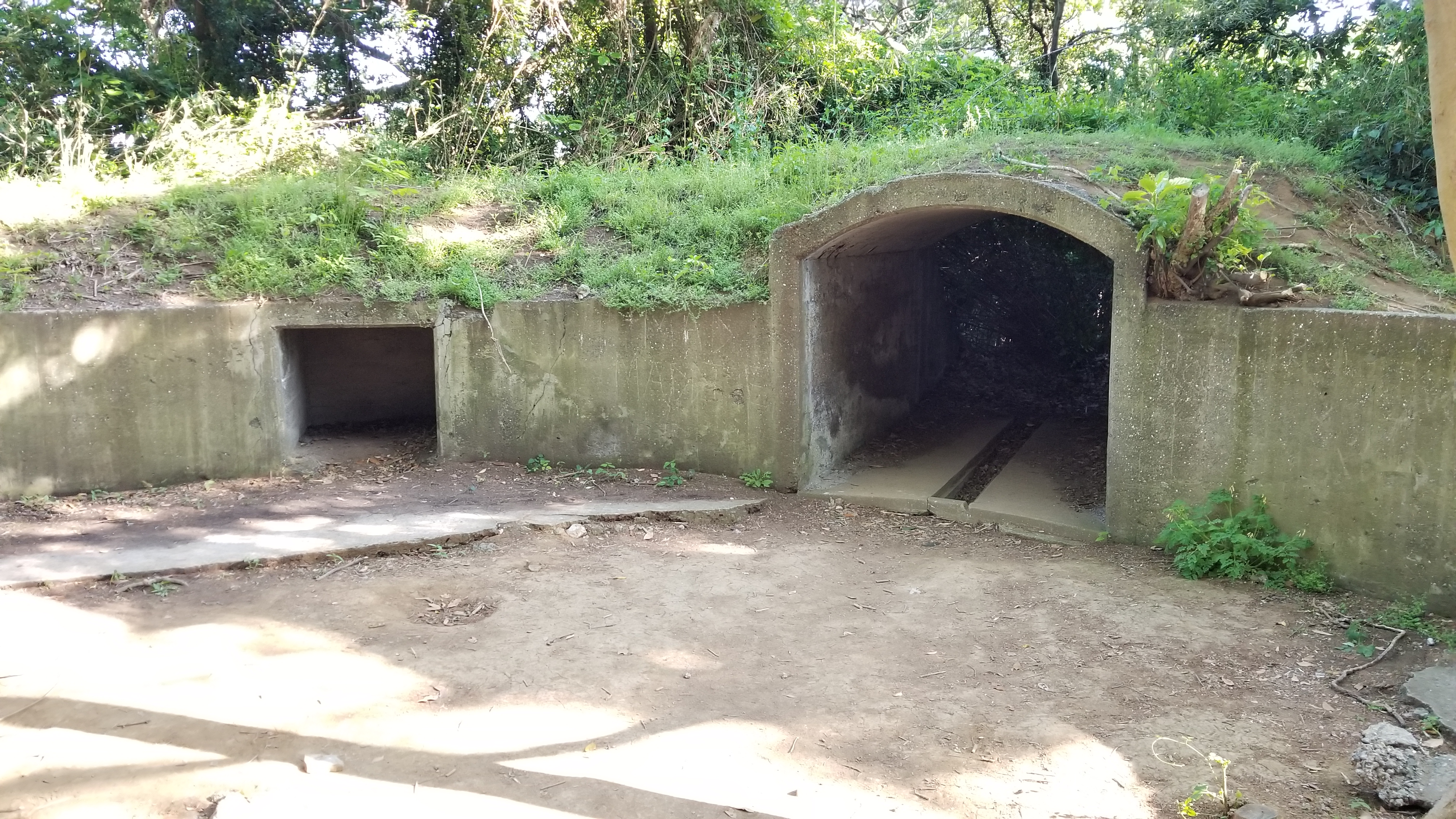
Gun Battery Recess

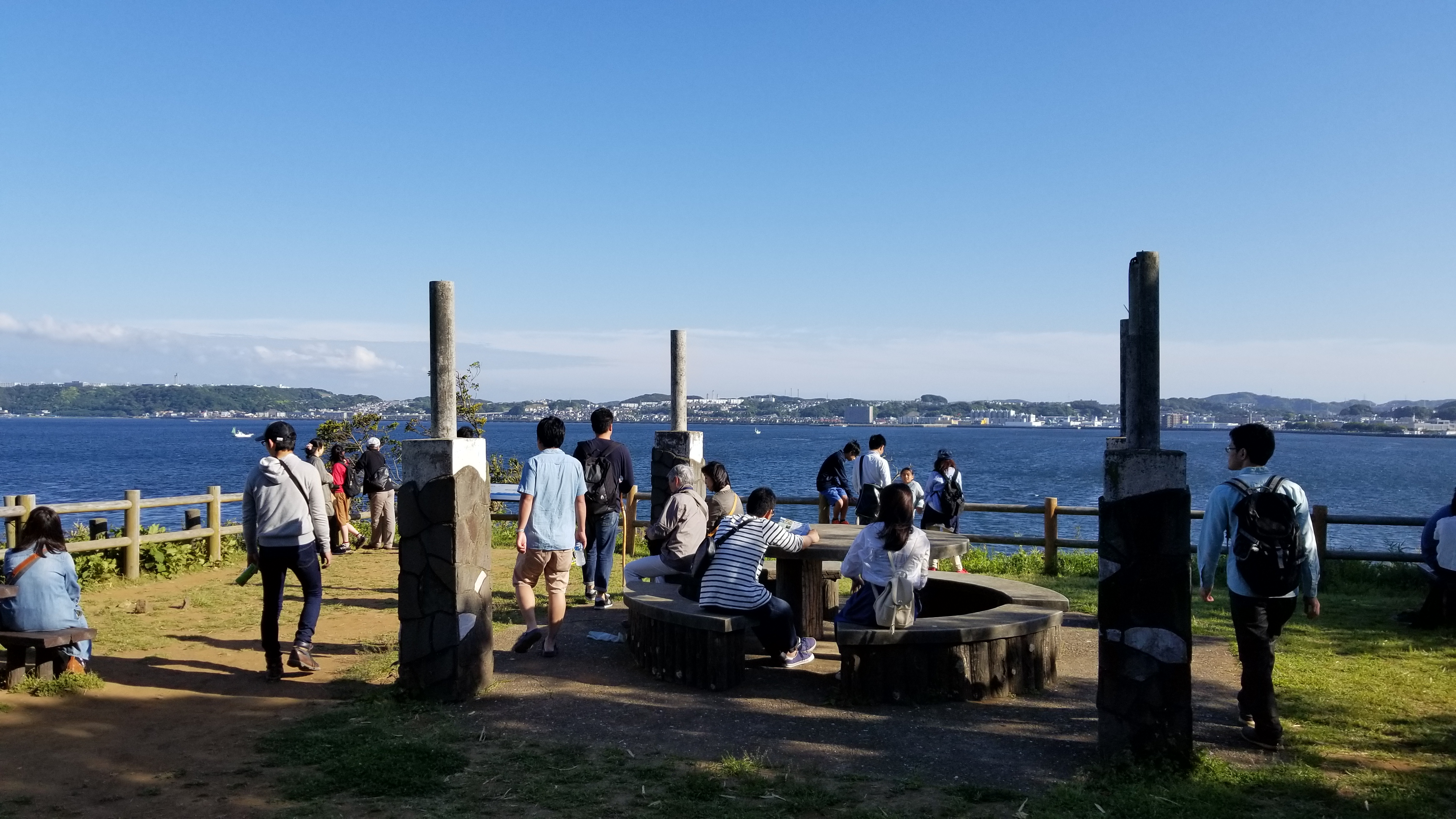
Northwestern Overlook

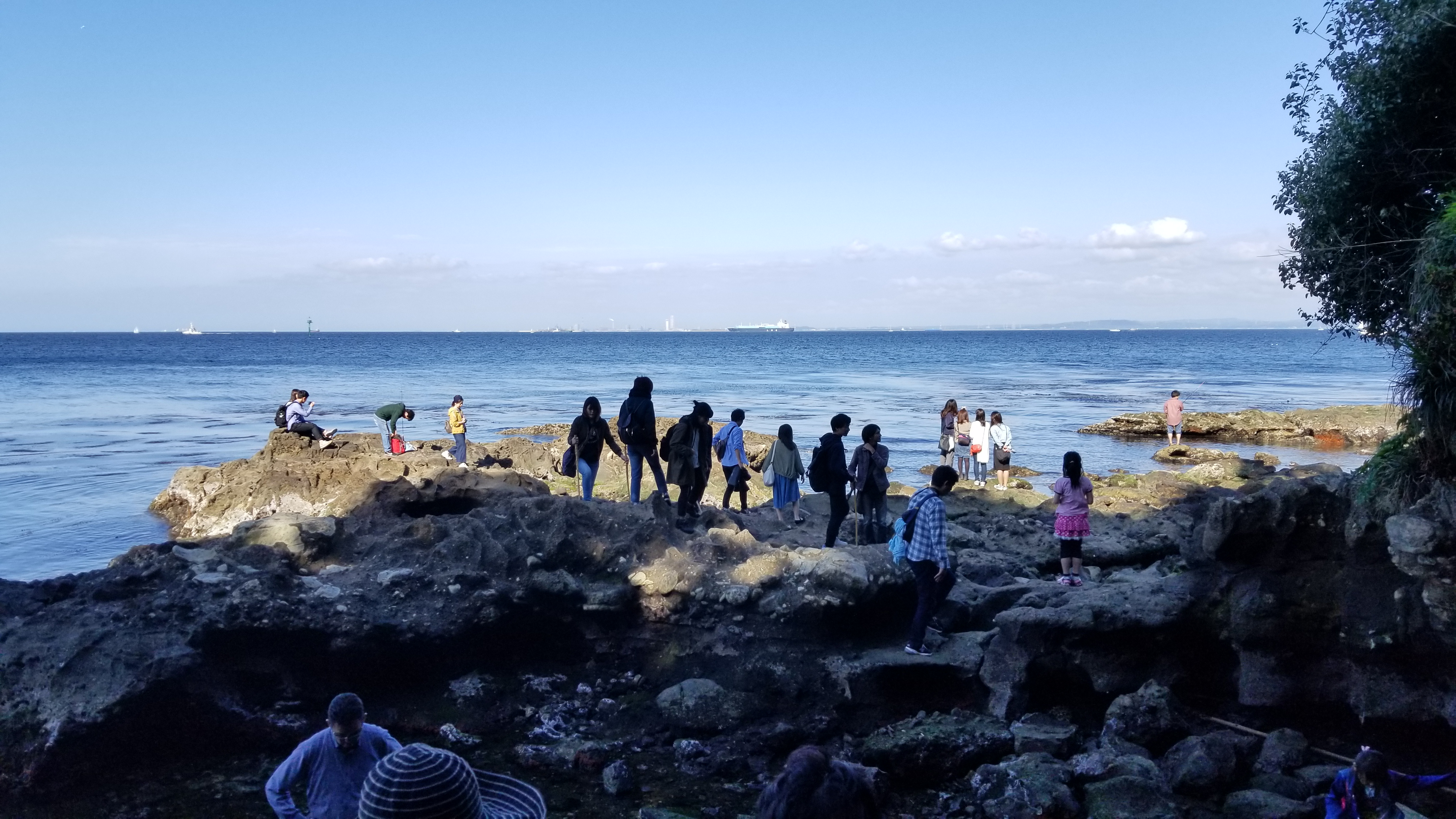
Northern Cove
