= List of East Japan Railway Company stations =

List of East Japan Railway Company stations lists stations of the East Japan Railway Company (JR East), including lines serving the station and daily ridership.

== Summary ==
The reported ridership is the most recent figure available, and represents average daily entries at each station, excluding in-system transfers. For “interface” stations that allow for through-servicing and transfers with other railways without exiting the station's paid area—e.g., Ayase on the Chiyoda Line—the reported ridership includes cross-company passengers on through-servicing trains (as part of trackage rights agreements) or transferring from other railways' trains without passing through faregates. For stations served by both Shinkansen and non-Shinkansen services, the reported ridership includes Shinkansen station entries.

== Stations ==
=== Tokyo Suburban Area ===
For its services in the Greater Tokyo Area, JR East defines the Tokyo Suburban Area(Japanese: 東京近郊区間) for fare calculation purposes, roughly correlating with the Suica coverage area (as of 2012.03.17). However, Suica coverage does not extend to the Karasuyama Line, Kashima Line, and Kururi Line, which are considered part of the Tokyo Suburban Area. As of 2012.03.17, there are a total of 624 “unique” passenger stations (i.e., counting stations served by multiple lines only once) in the Tokyo Suburban Area, excluding Shinkansen-only stations (e.g., Honjō-Waseda)

Station	JR East Lines	Other Lines	Code	Daily Station Entries	Source Year
Abiko	■ Jōban Line; Jōban Line (Local); Jōban Line (Rapid) ■ Narita Line			29,989	2011
Ageo	■ Takasaki Line			40,395	2011
Aihara	Yokohama Line			10,099	2011
Ajiki	■ Narita Line			3,137	2011
Ajiro	Itō Line			913	2011
Akabane	Keihin–Tōhoku Line; Saikyō Line; Shōnan–Shinjuku Line; Utsunomiya Line/Takasaki Line	Saitama Railway Line (Akabane-iwabuchi); Namboku Line (Akabane-iwabuchi)	ABN	87,346	2011
Akatsuka	■ Jōban Line			5,532	2011
Akigawa	Itsukaichi Line			7,310	2011
Akihabara	Chūō–Sōbu Line; Keihin–Tōhoku Line; Yamanote Line	Shinjuku Line (Iwamotochō); Hibiya Line; Tsukuba Express	AKB	230,689	2011
Akishima	Ōme Line			25,526	2011
Anegasaki	■ Uchibō Line			10,537	2011
Annaka	■ Shin'etsu Main Line			1,886	2011
Anzen	Tsurumi Line			1,625	2008
Aohori	■ Uchibō Line			1,525	2011
Arakawaoki	■ Jōban Line			8,445	2011
Araki	■ Narita Line			2,905	2011
Asagaya	Chūō Line; Chūō–Sōbu Line			43,096	2011
Asahi	■ Sōbu Main Line			1,871	2011
Asakusabashi	Chūō–Sōbu Line	Asakusa Line		51,475	2011
Asano	Tsurumi Line			894	2008
Ashikaga	■ Ryōmō Line	Isesaki Line (Ashikagashi)		3,305	2011
Atami	Itō Line; Tōkaidō Line	Tōkaidō Shinkansen; Tōkaidō Main Line		8,871	2011
Atsugi	■ Sagami Line	Odawara Line		6,106	2011
Awa-Amatsu	■ Sotobō Line			140	2011
Awa-Kamogawa	■ Sotobō Line ■ Uchibō Line			1,407	2011
Awa-Katsuyama	■ Uchibō Line			393	2011
Awa-Kominato	■ Sotobō Line			175	2011
Ayase	Jōban Line (Local)	Chiyoda Line		16,088	2011
Bakurochō	Sōbu Line	Asakusa Line (Higashi-Nihombashi); Shinjuku Line (Bakuro-yokoyama)		24,400	2011
Banda	■ Sagami Line			3,192	2011
Bentembashi	Tsurumi Line			5,416	2008
Bubaigawara	Nambu Line	Keiō Line		37,598	2011
Chiba	Chūō–Sōbu Line ■ Narita Line; Sōbu Line ■ Sōbu Main Line ■ Sotobō Line ■ Uchibō Line	Chiba Urban Monorail; Chiba Line (Keisei Chiba)		104,788	2011
Chiba-Minato	Keiyō Line	Chiba Urban Monorail		14,559	2011
Chigasaki	■ Sagami Line; Tōkaidō Line			54,465	2011
Chikura	■ Uchibō Line			457	2011
Chitose	■ Uchibō Line			62	2006
Chōjamachi	■ Sotobō Line			578	2011
Chōshi	■ Narita Line ■ Sōbu Main Line	Chōshi Electric Railway Line		3,366	2011
Ebina	■ Sagami Line	Odawara Line; Sōtetsu Main Line		9,418	2011
Ebisu	Saikyō Line; Shōnan–Shinjuku Line; Yamanote Line	Hibiya Line	EBS	128,555	2011
Emi	■ Uchibō Line			80	2011
Enokido	■ Sōbu Main Line			2,479	2011
Enzan	Chūō Main Line			2,141	2011
Etchūjima	Keiyō Line			4,137	2011
Fubasami	■ Nikkō Line			263 (Note: Daily ridership derived from reported annual ridership.)	2009
Fuchinobe	Yokohama Line			39,350	2011
Fuchūhommachi	Musashino Line; Nambu Line			16,565	2011
Fujino	Chūō Main Line			2,691	2011
Fujisawa	Tōkaidō Line	Enoden; Enoshima Line		102,054	2011
Fujishiro	■ Jōban Line			7,095	2011
Fukaya	■ Takasaki Line			10,273	2011
Fukiage	■ Takasaki Line			9,528	2011
Fukuhara	■ Mito Line			169	2011
Fukutawara	■ Tōgane Line			578	2006
Funabashi	Chūō–Sōbu Line; Sōbu Line	Main Line (Keisei Funabashi); Tōbu Urban Park Line		133,774	2011
Funabashi-Hōten	Musashino Line			16,860	2011
Fusa	■ Narita Line			3,679	2011
Fussa	Ōme Line			15,984	2011
Futamatao	Ōme Line			486	2011
Futamata-Shinmachi	Keiyō Line			4,830	2011
Futomi	■ Uchibō Line			72	2011
Gion	■ Kururi Line			319	2006
Goi	■ Uchibō Line	Kominato Line		18,332	2011
Gokan	■ Jōetsu Line			913	2011
Gotanda	Yamanote Line	Asakusa Line; Ikegami Line		127,996	2011
Gumyō	■ Tōgane Line			1,880	2011
Gunma-Fujioka	■ Hachikō Line			1,166	2011
Gunma-Sōja	■ Jōetsu Line			1,442	2011
Gunma-Yawata	■ Shin'etsu Main Line			961	2011
Gyōda	■ Takasaki Line			6,792	2011
Hachiōji	Chūō Main Line; Chūō Line ■ Hachikō Line; Yokohama Line	Keiō Line(Keiō Hachiōji)		81,474	2011
Hachiōji-Minamino	Yokohama Line			16,769	2011
Haguro	■ Mito Line			765	2011
Haijima	■ Hachikō Line; Itsukaichi Line; Ōme Line	Haijima Line		28,076	2011
Hakonegasaki	■ Hachikō Line			4,112	2011
Hamakanaya	■ Uchibō Line			283	2011
Hama-Kawasaki	Nambu Line; Tsurumi Line			2,606	2008
Hamamatsuchō	Keihin–Tōhoku Line; Yamanote Line	Asakusa Line (Daimon); Ōedo Line(Daimon); Haneda Airport Line	HMC	151,480	2011
Hamano	■ Uchibō Line			6,672	2011
Hamura	Ōme Line			13,872	2011
Harajuku	Yamanote Line	Chiyoda Line (Meiji-Jingūmae); Fukutoshin Line (Meiji-Jingūmae)		69,750	2011
Harataima	■ Sagami Line			4,133	2011
Hashimoto	■ Sagami Line; Yokohama Line	Sagamihara Line		60,241	2011
Hasuda	■ Utsunomiya Line			20,921	2011
Hatchōbori	Keiyō Line	Hibiya Line		28,962	2011
Hatchōnawate	Nambu Line	Main Line		1,197	2011
Hatonosu	Ōme Line			210	2011
Hatori	■ Jōban Line			2,230	2011
Hatsukari	Chūō Main Line			380	2011
Hayakawa	Tōkaidō Line			1,391	2011
Higashi-Abiko	■ Narita Line			729	2006
Higashi-Akiru	Itsukaichi Line			4,809	2011
Higashi-Chiba	■ Narita Line ■ Sōbu Main Line			2,130	2011
Higashi-Funabashi	Chūō–Sōbu Line			18,563	2011
Higashi-Fussa	■ Hachikō Line			1,422	2010
Higashi-Hannō	■ Hachikō Line	Ikebukuro Line		5,422	2011
Higashi-Jūjō	Keihin–Tōhoku Line			21,628	2011
Higashi-Kanagawa	Keihin–Tōhoku Line; Yokohama Line	Main Line (Nakakido)		31,615	2011
Higashi-Kawaguchi	Musashino Line	Saitama Railway Line		29,665	2011
Higashi-Kiyokawa	■ Kururi Line			86	2006
Higashi-Koganei	Chūō Line			27,535	2011
Higashi-Matsudo	Musashino Line	Hokusō Line; Narita Sky Access Line		15,405	2011
Higashi-Nakagami	Ōme Line			6,868	2011
Higashi-Nakano	Chūō–Sōbu Line	Ōedo Line		38,301	2011
Higashi-Ōme	Ōme Line			6,724	2011
Higashi-Ōmiya	■ Utsunomiya Line			30,845	2011
Higashi-Tokorozawa	Musashino Line			14,548	2011
Higashi-Totsuka	Yokosuka Line			57,520	2011
Higashi-Urawa	Musashino Line			26,763	2011
Higashi-Washinomiya	■ Utsunomiya Line			10,844	2011
Higashi-Yamanashi	Chūō Main Line			684	2009
Higashi-Yokota	■ Kururi Line			156	2006
Higashi-Yūki	■ Mito Line				
Higashi-Zushi	Yokosuka Line			5,198	2011
Higata	■ Sōbu Main Line			912	2011
Hinatawada	Ōme Line			940	2011
Hino	Chūō Line			27,710	2011
Hirai	Chūō–Sōbu Line			30,874	2011
Hirama	Nambu Line			14,103	2011
Hiratsuka	Tōkaidō Line			59,757	2011
Hirayama	■ Kururi Line			48	2006
Hitachi	■ Jōban Line			11,182	2011
Hitachino-Ushiku	■ Jōban Line			5,849	2011
Hitachi-Taga	■ Jōban Line			6,454	2011
Hodogaya	Yokosuka Line			31,932	2011
Hon-Chiba	■ Sotobō Line ■ Uchibō Line			9,069	2011
Honda	■ Sotobō Line			6,641	2011
Hongōdai	Negishi Line			19,058	2011
Honjō	■ Takasaki Line			10,440	2011
Honjō-Waseda Station
Honnō	■ Sotobō Line			1,814	2011
Hōshakuji	■ Karasuyama Line ■ Utsunomiya Line			2,130	2011
Hota	■ Uchibō Line			304	2011
Hyūga	■ Sōbu Main Line			1,294	2011
Ichigaya	Chūō–Sōbu Line	Shinjuku Line; Namboku Line; Yūrakuchō Line		56,956	2011
Ichikawa	Chūō–Sōbu Line; Sōbu Line			58,331	2011
Ichikawa-Ōno	Musashino Line			11,097	2011
Ichikawa-Shiohama	Keiyō Line			6,377	2011
Iidabashi	Chūō–Sōbu Line	Ōedo Line; Namboku Line; Tōzai Line; Yūrakuchō Line		90,763	2011
Iigura	■ Sōbu Main Line			449	2006
Iioka	■ Sōbu Main Line			754	2011
Ikebukuro	Saikyō Line; Shōnan–Shinjuku Line; Yamanote Line	Ikebukuro Line; Tojo Line; Fukutoshin Line; Marunouchi Line; Yūrakuchō Line	IKB	544,762	2011
Ikusabata	Ōme Line			238	2010
Imaichi	■ Nikkō Line	Kinugawa Line (Shimo-Imaichi); Nikkō Line (Shimo-Imaichi)		1,163	2011
Inada	■ Mito Line			212	2011
Inadazutsumi	Nambu Line	Sagamihara Line(Keiō-Inadazutsumi)		23,202	2011
Inage	Chūō–Sōbu Line; Sōbu Line			49,472	2011
Inage-Kaigan	Keiyō Line			21,112	2011
Inagi-Naganuma	Nambu Line			6,577	2011
Ino	■ Jōetsu Line			2,036	2011
Iriya	■ Sagami Line			1,091	2007
Isawa-onsen	Chūō Main Line			2,566	2011
Isesaki	■ Ryōmō Line	Isesaki Line		5,193	2011
Ishibashi	■ Utsunomiya Line			4,674	2011
Ishigamimae	Ōme Line			301	2010
Ishikawachō	Negishi Line			34,148	2011
Ishioka	■ Jōban Line			5,595	2011
Isobe	■ Shin'etsu Main Line			1,148	2011
Isogo	Negishi Line			18,256	2011
Isohara	■ Jōban Line			1,860	2011
Itabashi	Saikyō Line	Mita Line (Shin-Itabashi)		30,168	2011
Itako	■ Kashima Line			325	2011
Itō	Itō Line	Izu Kyūkō Line		7,403	2011
Iwafune	■ Ryōmō Line			573	2009
Iwai	■ Uchibō Line			313	2011
Iwajuku	■ Ryōmō Line			1,111	2011
Iwaki	■ Ban'etsu East Line ■ Jōban Line			4,175	2011
Iwama	■ Jōban Line			1,350	2011
Iwamoto	■ Jōetsu Line			252	2009
Iwane	■ Uchibō Line			1,900	2011
Iwase	■ Mito Line			1,011	2011
Izumi	■ Jōban Line			1,928	2011
Izu-Taga	Itō Line			628	2011
Jichi-Idai	■ Utsunomiya Line			3,791	2011
Jimbohara	■ Takasaki Line			2,841	2011
Jūjō	Saikyō Line			34,044	2011
Jūnikyō	■ Kashima Line			55	2006
Jūō	■ Jōban Line			3,121	2011
Kabe	Ōme Line			13,120	2011
Kadosawabashi	■ Sagami Line			1,698	2011
Kagawa	■ Sagami Line			4,795	2011
Kagohara	■ Takasaki Line			14,862	2011
Kaihimmakuhari	Keiyō Line			53,772	2011
Kairakuen	■ Jōban Line				
Kai-Yamato	Chūō Main Line			132	2011
Kamakura	Yokosuka Line	Enoden		40,041	2011
Kamasusaka	■ Utsunomiya Line			354	2011
Kamata	Keihin–Tōhoku Line	Ikegami Line; Tōkyū Tamagawa Line		133,593	2011
Kamatori	■ Sotobō Line			19,016	2011
Kameari	Jōban Line (Local)			38,988	2011
Kameido	Chūō–Sōbu Line	Kameido Line		54,986	2011
Kamimizo	■ Sagami Line			5,351	2011
Kamimoku	■ Jōetsu Line			147	2009
Kami-Nakazato	Keihin–Tōhoku Line			6,983	2011
Kamoi	Yokohama Line			37,828	2011
Kamonomiya	Tōkaidō Line			12,525	2011
Kanamachi	Jōban Line (Local)	Kanamachi Line (Keisei Kanamachi)		44,053	2011
Kanda	Chūō Line; Keihin–Tōhoku Line; Yamanote Line	Ginza Line	KND	99,307	2011
Kandatsu	■ Jōban Line			5,289	2011
Kaneko	■ Hachikō Line			2,098	2011
Kannai	Negishi Line	Blue Line		55,610	2011
Kanuma	■ Nikkō Line			2,012	2011
Karasuyama	■ Karasuyama Line			515	2011
Kasahata	■ Kawagoe Line			2,863	2011
Kasai-Rinkai-kōen	Keiyō Line			11,644	2011
Kasama	■ Mito Line			1,363	2011
Kashima Soccer Stadium	■ Kashima Line	Ōarai Kashima Line		354	2011
Kashimada	Nambu Line			16,438	2011
Kashima-Jingū	■ Kashima Line	Ōarai Kashima Line		906	2011
Kashiwa	■ Jōban Line; Jōban Line (Local); Jōban Line (Rapid)	Tōbu Urban Park Line		118,611	2011
Kasugaichō	Chūō Main Line			498	2009
Katakura	Yokohama Line	Takao Line (Keiō-Katakura)		5,126	2011
Kataoka	■ Utsunomiya Line			725	2011
Katori	■ Kashima Line ■ Narita Line			232	2006
Katsunuma-budōkyō	Chūō Main Line			420	2011
Katsuta	■ Jōban Line	Minato Line		11,803	2011
Katsuura	■ Sotobō Line			1,174	2011
Kawagoe	■ Kawagoe Line	Shinjuku Line (Hon-Kawagoe); Tojo Line		36,344	2011
Kawaguchi	Keihin–Tōhoku Line			78,175	2011
Kawai	Ōme Line			233	2010
Kawasaki	Keihin–Tōhoku Line; Nambu Line; Tōkaidō Line	Daishi Line (Keikyū Kawasaki); Main Line (Keikyū Kawasaki)	KWS	185,651	2011
Kawasaki-Shimmachi	Nambu Line			1,336	2011
Kawashima	■ Mito Line			768	2011
Kazusa-Ichinomiya	■ Sotobō Line			2,951	2011
Kazusa-Kameyama	■ Kururi Line			90	2010
Kazusa-Kiyokawa	■ Kururi Line			254	2006
Kazusa-Matsuoka	■ Kururi Line			81	2006
Kazusa-Minato	■ Uchibō Line			854	2011
Kazusa-Okitsu	■ Sotobō Line			203	2011
Kemigawahama	Keiyō Line			15,220	2011
Kichijōji	Chūō Line; Chūō–Sōbu Line	Inokashira Line		137,555	2011
Kikuna	Yokohama Line	Tōyoko Line		50,595	2011
Kimitsu	■ Uchibō Line			8,535	2011
Kinomiya	Itō Line			1,131	2011
Kinshichō	Chūō–Sōbu Line; Sōbu Line	Hanzōmon Line		99,167	2011
Kinugasa	Yokosuka Line			9,100	2011
Kioroshi	■ Narita Line			2,206	2011
Kiryū	■ Ryōmō Line	Jōmō Line (Nishi-Kiryū) ■ Watarase Keikoku Line		3,717	2011
Kisarazu	■ Kururi Line ■ Uchibō Line			13,274	2011
Kita-Ageo	■ Takasaki Line			14,411	2011
Kita-Akabane	Saikyō Line			17,295	2011
Kita-Asaka	Musashino Line	Tojo Line (Asakadai)		63,263	2011
Kita-Chigasaki	■ Sagami Line			2,659	2011
Kita-Fuchū	Musashino Line			13,490	2011
Kita-Fujioka	■ Hachikō Line			333	2009
Kita-Hachiōji	■ Hachikō Line			7,438	2011
Kita-Kamakura	Yokosuka Line			8,473	2011
Kita-Kashiwa	Jōban Line (Local)			19,426	2011
Kita-Kogane	Jōban Line (Local)			24,625	2011
Kita-Kōnosu	■ Takasaki Line			8,001	2011
Kita-Matsudo	Jōban Line (Local)			20,766	2011
Kitamoto	■ Takasaki Line			19,563	2011
Kita-Senju	■ Jōban Line; Jōban Line (Local); Jōban Line (Rapid)	Isesaki Line; Chiyoda Line; Hibiya Line; Tsukuba Express		194,136	2011
Kita-Takasaki	■ Shin'etsu Main Line			1,615	2011
Kita-Toda	Saikyō Line			17,133	2011
Kita-Urawa	Keihin–Tōhoku Line			49,524	2011
Kita-Yono	Saikyō Line			8,147	2011
Kobana	■ Karasuyama Line			16	2009
Kobayashi	■ Narita Line			2,278	2011
Kobuchi	Yokohama Line			21,313	2011
Kodama	■ Hachikō Line			339	2011
Kōenji	Chūō Line; Chūō–Sōbu Line			48,055	2011
Kōfu	Chūō Main Line	Minobu Line		13,608	2011
Koga	■ Utsunomiya Line			13,437	2011
Koganei	■ Utsunomiya Line			3,954	2011
Kohoku	■ Narita Line			3,923	2011
Koiwa	Chūō–Sōbu Line			62,052	2011
Kokonoe	■ Uchibō Line			103	2006
Kokubunji	Chūō Line	Kokubunji Line; Tamako Line		104,731	2011
Kokudō	Tsurumi Line			1,539	2008
Komagata	■ Ryōmō Line			2,640	2011
Komagawa	■ Hachikō Line ■ Kawagoe Line			4,516	2011
Komagome	Yamanote Line	Namboku Line		46,005	2011
Komiya	■ Hachikō Line			2,783	2011
Kōnandai	Negishi Line			33,307	2011
Kōnosu	■ Takasaki Line			19,727	2011
Kōnoyama	■ Karasuyama Line			164	2009
Kori	Ōme Line			278	2011
Koshigaya-Laketown	Musashino Line			18,115	2011
Kōzu	Tōkaidō Line	Gotemba Line		6,364	2011
Kozukue	Yokohama Line			9,592	2011
Kuji	Nambu Line			13,170	2011
Kuki	■ Utsunomiya Line	Isesaki Line		35,629	2011
Kumagawa	Itsukaichi Line			1,438	2011
Kumagaya	Jōetsu Shinkansen; Hokuriku Shinkansen ■ Takasaki Line	Chichibu Main Line		30,644	2011
Kunisada	■ Ryōmō Line			1,317	2011
Kunitachi	Chūō Line			52,097	2011
Kuragano	■ Hachikō Line	■ Takasaki Line		1,547	2011
Kurahashi	■ Sōbu Main Line			61	2006
Kurami	■ Sagami Line			1,720	2011
Kurihama	Yokosuka Line	Kurihama Line (Keikyū Kurihama)		6,938	2011
Kurihashi	■ Utsunomiya Line	Nikkō Line		11,989	2011
Kuroiso	■ Tōhoku Main Line ■ Utsunomiya Line			2,364	2011
Kururi	■ Kururi Line			433	2011
Kuzumi	■ Narita Line			238	2006
Mabashi	Jōban Line (Local)	Nagareyama Line		24,325	2011
Machida	Yokohama Line	Odawara Line		109,042	2011
Maebashi	■ Ryōmō Line	Jōmō Line (Chūō-Maebashi)		9,294	2011
Maebashi-Ōshima	■ Ryōmō Line			1,484	2011
Maihama	Keiyō Line	Maihama Resort Line Disney Resort Line (Resort Gateway)		63,898	2011
Makuhari	Chūō–Sōbu Line	Chiba Line (Keisei Makuhari)		15,498	2011
Makuharihongō	Chūō–Sōbu Line	Chiba Line (Keisei Makuharihongō		25,933	2011
Makuta	■ Kururi Line			272	2011
Mamada	■ Utsunomiya Line			4,075	2011
Manazuru	Tōkaidō Line			3,669	2011
Matoba	■ Kawagoe Line			2,894	2011
Matsudo	■ Jōban Line; Jōban Line (Local); Jōban Line (Rapid)	Matsudo Line		98,161	2011
Matsugishi	■ Narita Line ■ Sōbu Main Line			471	2011
Matsuhisa	■ Hachikō Line			119	2010
Matsuida	■ Shin'etsu Main Line			501	2011
Matsuo	■ Sōbu Main Line			1,050	2011
Meguro	Yamanote Line	Mita Line; Namboku Line; Meguro Line		101,998	2011
Mejiro	Yamanote Line			37,355	2011
Mikado	■ Sotobō Line			123	2006
Mikawashima	■ Jōban Line; Jōban Line (Rapid)			9,763	2011
Minakami	■ Jōetsu Line			450	2011
Minami-Funabashi	Keiyō Line			19,147	2011
Minami-Furuya	■ Kawagoe Line			7,879	2011
Minamihara	■ Uchibō Line			492	2011
Minami-Hashimoto	■ Sagami Line			5,189	2011
Minami-Kashiwa	Jōban Line (Local)			31,612	2011
Minami-Koshigaya	Musashino Line	Isesaki Line (Shin-Koshigaya)		67,114	2011
Minami-Nagareyama	Musashino Line	Tsukuba Express		27,958	2011
Minami-Nakagō	■ Jōban Line			630	2011
Minami-Senju	■ Jōban Line; Jōban Line (Rapid)	Hibiya Line; Tsukuba Express		15,305	2011
Minami-Shisui	■ Sōbu Main Line			208	2006
Minami-Tama	Nambu Line	Tamagawa Line (Koremasa)		6,461	2011
Minami-Urawa	Keihin–Tōhoku Line; Musashino Line			56,408	2011
Minami-Yono	Saikyō Line			15,612	2011
Misato	Musashino Line			14,287	2011
Mitaka	Chūō Line; Chūō–Sōbu Line			89,295	2011
Mitake	Ōme Line	Mitake Tozan Railway		658	2011
Mito	■ Jōban Line ■ Suigun Line	Ōarai Kashima Line		26,699	2011
Miyahara	■ Takasaki Line			23,061	2011
Miyanohira	Ōme Line			504	2010
Miyayama	■ Sagami Line			2,043	2011
Mobara	■ Sotobō Line			11,346	2011
Monoi	■ Narita Line ■ Sōbu Main Line			3,968	2011
Moro	■ Hachikō Line			699	2011
Moto-Yawata	Chūō–Sōbu Line	Main Line (Keisei Yawata); Shinjuku Line		56,644	2011
Mukaigawara	Nambu Line			15,048	2011
Musashi-Hikida	Itsukaichi Line			3,946	2011
Musashi-Itsukaichi	Itsukaichi Line			4,509	2011
Musashi-Koganei	Chūō Line			56,677	2011
Musashi-Kosugi	Nambu Line; Yokosuka Line	Meguro Line; Tōyoko Line	MKG	103,624	2011
Musashi-Masuko	Itsukaichi Line			2,633	2011
Musashi-Mizonokuchi	Nambu Line	Den-en-toshi Line (Mizonokuchi); Ōimachi Line (Mizonokuchi)		76,774	2011
Musashi-Nakahara	Nambu Line			33,182	2011
Musashi-Sakai	Chūō Line	Tamagawa Line		61,021	2011
Musashi-Shinjō	Nambu Line			31,667	2011
Musashi-Shiraishi	Tsurumi Line			1,601	2008
Musashi-Takahagi	■ Kawagoe Line			3,079	2011
Musashi-Urawa	Musashino Line; Saikyō Line			46,290	2011
Myōkaku	■ Hachikō Line			355	2011
Nagata	■ Sotobō Line			1,224	2011
Nagatsuta	Yokohama Line	Den-en-toshi Line; Kodomonokuni Line		56,867	2011
Nagaura	■ Uchibō Line			6,363	2011
Nakagami	Ōme Line			10,233	2011
Nakano	Chūō Line; Chūō–Sōbu Line	Tōzai Line		122,846	2011
Nakanoshima	Nambu Line			14,244	2011
Naka-Urawa	Saikyō Line			12,111	2011
Nakayama	Yokohama Line	Green Line		37,829	2011
Nako-Funakata	■ Uchibō Line			197	2011
Nakoso	■ Jōban Line			806	2011
Namegawa	■ Narita Line			1,028	2011
Namegawa Island	■ Sotobō Line			19	2006
Namihana	■ Sotobō Line			96	2006
Narita	■ Narita Line	Higashi-Narita Line (Keisei Narita); Main Line (Keisei Narita)		14,298	2011
Narita Airport Terminal 1	■ Narita Line	Main Line; Narita Sky Access Line		5,061	2011
Narita Airport Terminal 2·3	■ Narita Line	Main Line; Narita Sky Access Line		3,482	2011
Naruse	Yokohama Line			18,867	2011
Narutō	■ Sōbu Main Line ■ Tōgane Line			2,903	2011
Nasu-Shiobara	Tōhoku Shinkansen ■ Utsunomiya Line			4,586	2011
Nebukawa	Tōkaidō Line			639	2008
Negishi	Negishi Line			20,188	2011
Niihari	■ Mito Line			623	2011
Niita	■ Karasuyama Line			427	2009
Niiza	Musashino Line			17,834	2011
Nikkō	■ Nikkō Line	Nikkō Line (Tōbu Nikkō)		815	2011
Ninomiya	Tōkaidō Line			13,861	2011
Nippori	■ Jōban Line; Jōban Line (Rapid); Keihin–Tōhoku Line; Yamanote Line	Main Line; Nippori–Toneri Liner	NPR	96,747	2011
Nirasaki	Chūō Main Line			2,622	2011
Nishi-Chiba	Chūō–Sōbu Line			23,207	2011
Nishifu	Nambu Line			8,205	2011
Nishi-Funabashi	Chūō–Sōbu Line; Keiyō Line; Musashino Line	Tōzai Line; Tōyō Rapid Railway Line		125,276	2011
Nishi-Hachiōji	Chūō Line			30,543	2011
Nishi-Kawagoe	■ Kawagoe Line			1,210	2011
Nishi-Kawaguchi	Keihin–Tōhoku Line			50,522	2011
Nishi-Kokubunji	Chūō Line; Musashino Line			26,804	2011
Nishi-Kunitachi	Nambu Line			9,438	2011
Nishi-Matsuida	■ Shin'etsu Main Line			311	2011
Nishi-Nasuno	■ Utsunomiya Line			3,527	2011
Nishi-Nippori	Keihin–Tōhoku Line; Yamanote Line	Nippori–Toneri Liner; Chiyoda Line		93,891	2011
Nishi-Ogikubo	Chūō Line; Chūō–Sōbu Line			40,133	2011
Nishi-Ōi	Shōnan–Shinjuku Line; Yokosuka Line			14,743	2011
Nishi-Ōmiya	■ Kawagoe Line			6,221	2011
Nishi-Tachikawa	Ōme Line			6,361	2011
Nishi-Urawa	Musashino Line			13,243	2011
Nisshin	■ Kawagoe Line			12,389	2011
Noborito	Nambu Line	Odawara Line		76,259	2011
Nobukata	■ Kashima Line				
Nogi	■ Utsunomiya Line			5,414	2011
Nozaki	■ Utsunomiya Line			1,260	2011
Numata	■ Jōetsu Line			1,910	2011
Ōami	■ Sotobō Line ■ Tōgane Line			10,693	2011
Obitsu	■ Kururi Line			154	2006
Ochanomizu	Chūō Line; Chūō–Sōbu Line	Chiyoda Line (Shin-Ochanomizu); Marunouchi Line		100,518	2011
Odawara	Tōkaidō Line	Tōkaidō Shinkansen; Hakone Tozan Line; Daiyūzan Line; Odawara Line		32,469	2011
Ōfuna	Negishi Line; Tōkaidō Line; Yokosuka Line	Shonan Monorail	OFN	93,397	2011
Ōgane	■ Karasuyama Line			322	2011
Ogawamachi	■ Hachikō Line	Tojo Line		602	2011
Ogikubo	Chūō Line; Chūō–Sōbu Line	Marunouchi Line		83,299	2011
Ōgimachi	Tsurumi Line			611	2008
Ogitsu	■ Jōban Line			2,657	2011
Ogose	■ Hachikō Line	Ogose Line		685	2011
Ōguchi	Yokohama Line			16,941	2011
Ōhara	■ Sotobō Line	Isumi Line		1,661	2011
Ōhirashita	■ Ryōmō Line			471	2009
Ōimachi	Keihin–Tōhoku Line	Ōimachi Line; Rinkai Line		95,225	2011
Ōiso	Tōkaidō Line			7,605	2011
Ōji	Keihin–Tōhoku Line	Toden Arakawa Line; Namboku Line		60,294	2011
Okabe	■ Takasaki Line			3,154	2011
Okachimachi	Keihin–Tōhoku Line; Yamanote Line	Ōedo Line(Ueno-okachimachi); Ginza Line (Ueno-hirokōji); Hibiya Line (Naka-Okachimachi)		68,402	2011
Okamoto	■ Utsunomiya Line			1,840	2011
Ōkawa	Tsurumi Line			1,009	2008
Okegawa	■ Takasaki Line			26,753	2011
Oku	Utsunomiya Line/Takasaki Line			7,644	2011
Ōkubo	Chūō–Sōbu Line			23,997	2011
Oku-Tama	Ōme Line			877	2011
Omata	■ Ryōmō Line			534	2009
Ōme	Ōme Line			6,951	2011
Omigawa	■ Narita Line			1,281	2011
Ōmika	■ Jōban Line			8,883	2011
Ōmiya	Akita Shinkansen; Jōetsu Shinkansen; Hokuriku Shinkansen; Tōhoku Shinkansen; Yamagata Shinkansen ■ Kawagoe Line; Keihin–Tōhoku Line; Saikyō Line; Shōnan–Shinjuku Line; Utsunomiya Line/Takasaki Line	New Shuttle; Tōbu Urban Park Line	OMY	235,744	2011
Omoigawa	■ Ryōmō Line			655	2009
Ōmori	Keihin–Tōhoku Line			90,946	2011
Onjuku	■ Sotobō Line			593	2011
Ōnuki	■ Uchibō Line			1,139	2011
Orihara	■ Hachikō Line			40	2010
Ōsaki	Saikyō Line; Shōnan–Shinjuku Line; Yamanote Line	Rinkai Line	OSK	127,838	2011
Otabayashi	■ Mito Line				
Ōto	■ Narita Line			243	2006
Ōtsuka	Yamanote Line	Toden Arakawa Line		51,861	2011
Ōtsuki	Chūō Main Line	Fujikyuko Line		5,153	2011
Ōtsukō	■ Jōban Line			993	2011
Oyama	Tōhoku Shinkansen ■ Mito Line ■ Ryōmō Line ■ Utsunomiya Line			20,947	2011
Ozaku	Ōme Line			17,252	2011
Ryōgoku	Chūō–Sōbu Line	Ōedo Line		37,926	2011
Ryūō	Chūō Main Line			2,050	2011
Sagamihara	Yokohama Line			27,858	2011
Sagamiko	Chūō Main Line			3,293	2011
Saitama-Shintoshin	Keihin–Tōhoku Line; Utsunomiya Line/Takasaki Line			40,251	2011
Sakaori	Chūō Main Line			2,063	2011
Sakura	■ Narita Line ■ Sōbu Main Line			10,422	2011
Sakuragichō	Negishi Line	Blue Line		61,288	2011
Samukawa	■ Sagami Line			6,584	2011
Sano	■ Ryōmō Line	Sano Line		3,315	2011
Sanuki	■ Jōban Line	Ryūgasaki Line		14,030	2011
Sanukimachi	■ Uchibō Line			315	2011
Saruda	■ Sōbu Main Line			240	2006
Saruhashi	Chūō Main Line			1,568	2011
Sasagawa	■ Narita Line			385	2011
Sasago	Chūō Main Line			143	2009
Sashiōgi	■ Kawagoe Line			11,264	2011
Sawa	■ Jōban Line			3,401	2011
Sawai	Ōme Line			274	2010
Sawara	■ Narita Line			3,071	2011
Sendagaya	Chūō–Sōbu Line	Ōedo Line(Kokuritsu-Kyōgijō)		20,008	2011
Shake	■ Sagami Line			1,761	2011
Shibukawa	■ Agatsuma Line ■ Jōetsu Line			3,428	2011
Shibuya	Saikyō Line; Shōnan–Shinjuku Line; Yamanote Line	Inokashira Line; Fukutoshin Line; Ginza Line; Hanzōmon Line; Den-en-toshi Line; Tōyoko Line	SBY	402,766	2011
Shiishiba	■ Narita Line			511	2006
Shikishima	■ Jōetsu Line			357	2009
Shimbashi	Keihin–Tōhoku Line; Tōkaidō Line; Yamanote Line; Yokosuka Line	Asakusa Line; Ginza Line; Yurikamome	SMB	243,890	2011
Shimodate	■ Mito Line	Jōsō Line; Mooka Line		3,332	2011
Shimogōri	■ Kururi Line			78	2006
Shimomizo	■ Sagami Line			1,008	2011
Shimōsa-Kōzaki	■ Narita Line			910	2011
Shimōsa-Manzaki	■ Narita Line			730	2011
Shimōsa-Nakayama	Chūō–Sōbu Line			22,885	2011
Shimōsa-Tachibana	■ Narita Line			391	2011
Shimōsa-Toyosato	■ Narita Line			171	2006
Shimotsuke-Hanaoka	■ Karasuyama Line			58	2009
Shimotsuke-Ōsawa	■ Nikkō Line			770	2011
Shinagawa	Keihin–Tōhoku Line; Tōkaidō Line; Yamanote Line; Yokosuka Line	Tōkaidō Shinkansen; Main Line	SGW	323,893	2011
Shin-Akitsu	Musashino Line	Ikebukuro Line (Akitsu)		36,928	2011
Shinanomachi	Chūō–Sōbu Line			26,031	2011
Shinjuku	Chūō Line; Chūō–Sōbu Line; Saikyō Line; Shōnan–Shinjuku Line; Yamanote Line	Keiō Line; Keiō New Line; Odawara Line; Shinjuku Line (Seibu-Shinjuku); Ōedo Line(Shinjuku, Shinjuku-Nishiguchi); Shinjuku Line (Shinjuku, Shinjuku-sanchōme); Fukutoshin Line (Shinjuku-sanchōme); Marunouchi Line (Shinjuku, Shinjuku-sanchōme)	SJK	734,154	2011
Shin-Kawasaki	Yokosuka Line			25,227	2011
Shin-Kemigawa	Chūō–Sōbu Line			22,873	2011
Shin-Kiba	Keiyō Line	Rinkai Line; Yūrakuchō Line		64,487	2011
Shin-Kodaira	Musashino Line	Tamako Line(Ōmekaidō)		11,073	2011
Shin-Koiwa	Chūō–Sōbu Line; Sōbu Line			70,435	2011
Shin-Koyasu	Keihin–Tōhoku Line	Main Line (Keikyū Shin-Koyasu)		20,536	2011
Shinmachi	■ Takasaki Line			3,740	2011
Shin-Maebashi	■ Jōetsu Line ■ Ryōmō Line			5,789	2011
Shim-Matsudo	Jōban Line (Local); Musashino Line	Nagareyama Line (Kōya)		35,784	2011
Shim-Misato	Musashino Line			16,498	2011
Shin-Mobara	■ Sotobō Line			1,318	2011
Shin-Narashino	Keiyō Line			12,532	2011
Shin-Nihombashi	Sōbu Line	Ginza Line (Mitsukoshimae); Hanzōmon Line (Mitsukoshimae)		18,007	2011
Shin-Ōkubo	Yamanote Line			42,433	2011
Shin-Shibaura	Tsurumi Line			362	2008
Shin-Shiraoka	■ Utsunomiya Line			6,109	2011
Shin-Sugita	Negishi Line	Kanazawa Seaside Line; Main Line (Sugita)		36,314	2011
Shin-Urayasu	Keiyō Line			53,655	2011
Shin-Yahashira	Musashino Line	Matsudo Line (Yabashira)		23,255	2011
Shin-Yokohama	Yokohama Line	Tōkaidō Shinkansen; Blue Line		56,666	2011
Shiomi	Keiyō Line			9,895	2011
Shiotsu	Chūō Main Line			1,911	2011
Shiozaki	Chūō Main Line			1,119	2011
Shiraoka	■ Utsunomiya Line			12,936	2011
Shiromaru	Ōme Line			74	2010
Shishido	■ Mito Line			458	2011
Shisui	■ Narita Line			3,055	2011
Shitte	Nambu Line			11,695	2011
Shōwa	Tsurumi Line			569	2008
Shukugawara	Nambu Line			7,198	2011
Sōbudaishita	■ Sagami Line			1,035	2011
Sodegaura	■ Uchibō Line			3,914	2011
Soga	Keiyō Line ■ Sotobō Line ■ Uchibō Line			30,513	2011
Sugamo	Yamanote Line	Mita Line		76,093	2011
Suidōbashi	Chūō–Sōbu Line	Mita Line		82,133	2011
Suigō	■ Narita Line			185	2006
Suzumenomiya	■ Utsunomiya Line			3,788	2011
Tabata	Keihin–Tōhoku Line; Yamanote Line			43,129	2011
Tachikawa	Chūō Line; Nambu Line; Ōme Line	Tama Toshi Monorail Line (Tachikawa-Kita, Tachikawa-Minami)		155,868	2011
Taitō	■ Sotobō Line			534	2011
Takadanobaba	Yamanote Line	Shinjuku Line; Tōzai Line		199,741	2011
Takahagi	■ Jōban Line			3,064	2011
Takahama	■ Jōban Line			1,248	2011
Takanawa Gateway	Keihin–Tōhoku Line; Yamanote Line				
Takao	Chūō Main Line; Chūō Line	Takao Line		29,968	2011
Takasaki	Jōetsu Shinkansen; Hokuriku Shinkansen ■ Agatsuma Line ■ Hachikō Line ■ Jōetsu Line ■ Ryōmō Line ■ Shin'etsu Main Line ■ Takasaki Line	Jōshin Electric Railway Jōshin Line		27,710	2011
Takasaki-Tonyamachi	■ Jōetsu Line			2,658	2011
Takeoka	■ Uchibō Line			64	2006
Takezawa	■ Hachikō Line			31	2010
Taki	■ Karasuyama Line			30	2009
Tamachi	Keihin–Tōhoku Line; Yamanote Line	Asakusa Line (Mita); Mita Line (Mita)		148,346	2011
Tamado	■ Mito Line			707	2011
Tanshō	■ Hachikō Line			269	2010
Tateyama	■ Uchibō Line			1,963	2011
Taura	Yokosuka Line			2,515	2011
Tawarada	■ Kururi Line			64	2006
Tennōdai	■ Jōban Line; Jōban Line (Local); Jōban Line (Rapid)			21,334	2011
Tochigi	■ Ryōmō Line	Nikkō Line; Utsunomiya Line		5,038	2011
Toda	Saikyō Line			16,985	2011
Toda-Kōen	Saikyō Line			29,750	2011
Tōgane	■ Tōgane Line			4,482	2011
Tōkai	■ Jōban Line			4,328	2011
Tōkaichiba	Yokohama Line			20,398	2011
Toke	■ Sotobō Line			13,847	2011
Tokyo	Akita Shinkansen; Jōetsu Shinkansen; Hokuriku Shinkansen; Tōhoku Shinkansen; Yamagata Shinkansen; Chūō Line; Keihin–Tōhoku Line; Keiyō Line; Sōbu Line; Tōkaidō Line; Yamanote Line; Yokosuka Line	Tōkaidō Shinkansen; Chiyoda Line (Nijūbashimae); Marunouchi Line; Tōzai Line (Ōtemachi)	TYO	380,997	2011
Tomita	■ Ryōmō Line			823	2011
Tomiura	■ Uchibō Line			239	2011
Tomobe	■ Jōban Line ■ Mito Line			3,461	2011
Torami	■ Sotobō Line			81	2006
Toride	■ Jōban Line; Jōban Line (Local); Jōban Line (Rapid)	Jōsō Line		28,315	2011
Torisawa	Chūō Main Line			944	2011
Toro	■ Utsunomiya Line			13,371	2011
Totsuka	Tōkaidō Line; Yokosuka Line	Blue Line	TTK	105,538	2011
Toyoda	Chūō Line			29,772	2011
Tsuchiura	■ Jōban Line			16,055	2011
Tsudanuma	Chūō–Sōbu Line; Sōbu Line	Matsudo Line (Shin-Tsudanuma)		101,327	2011
Tsudayama	Nambu Line			3,559	2011
Tsuga	■ Narita Line ■ Sōbu Main Line	Chiba Urban Monorail		19,979	2011
Tsujidō	Tōkaidō Line			50,203	2011
Tsukuda	■ Jōetsu Line			48	2009
Tsurumi	Keihin–Tōhoku Line; Tsurumi Line	Main Line (Keikyū Tsurumi)		76,445	2011
Tsurumi-Ono	Tsurumi Line			4,905	2008
Tsuruta	■ Nikkō Line			1,308	2011
Ubara	■ Sotobō Line			80	2011
Uchigō	■ Jōban Line			1,045	2011
Uchihara	■ Jōban Line			2,213	2011
Ueda	■ Jōban Line			1,727	2011
Ueno	Akita Shinkansen; Jōetsu Shinkansen; Hokuriku Shinkansen; Tōhoku Shinkansen; Yamagata Shinkansen ■ Jōban Line; Jōban Line (Rapid); Keihin–Tōhoku Line; Utsunomiya Line/Takasaki Line; Yamanote Line	Main Line (Keisei Ueno); Ginza Line; Hibiya Line	UEN	174,832	2011
Uenohara	Chūō Main Line			5,273	2011
Uguisudani	Keihin–Tōhoku Line; Yamanote Line			23,734	2011
Ujiie	■ Utsunomiya Line			2,910	2011
Ukima-Funado	Saikyō Line			19,463	2011
Umi-Shibaura	Tsurumi Line			3,250	2008
Urawa	Keihin–Tōhoku Line; Utsunomiya Line/Takasaki Line		URW	78,807	2011
Usami	Itō Line			1,272	2011
Ushihama	Ōme Line			4,154	2011
Ushiku	■ Jōban Line			13,922	2011
Utsunomiya	Tōhoku Shinkansen; Yamagata Shinkansen ■ Nikkō Line ■ Utsunomiya Line			34,023	2011
Wadaura	■ Uchibō Line			96	2011
Warabi	Keihin–Tōhoku Line			57,476	2011
Yabe	Yokohama Line			11,323	2011
Yachimata	■ Sōbu Main Line			6,126	2011
Yagawa	Nambu Line			7,394	2011
Yagihara	■ Jōetsu Line			956	2011
Yaho	Nambu Line			9,608	2011
Yaita	■ Utsunomiya Line			2,983	2011
Yakō	Nambu Line			16,318	2011
Yamamae	■ Ryōmō Line			784	2011
Yamanashishi	Chūō Main Line			1,748	2011
Yamate	Negishi Line			17,226	2011
Yamato	■ Mito Line			311	2010
Yanagawa	Chūō Main Line			232	2009
Yanokuchi	Nambu Line			9,193	2011
Yatsumi	■ Sotobō Line			878	2011
Yawatajuku	■ Uchibō Line			12,207	2011
Yōdo	■ Hachikō Line			89	2010
Yōkaichiba	■ Sōbu Main Line			1,952	2011
Yōkōdai	Negishi Line			20,890	2011
Yokohama	Keihin–Tōhoku Line; Negishi Line; Shōnan–Shinjuku Line; Tōkaidō Line; Yokohama Line; Yokosuka Line	Main Line (Keikyū Kawasaki); Minatomirai Line; Sōtetsu Main Line; Tōyoko Line; Blue Line	YHM	394,900	2011
Yokokawa	■ Shin'etsu Main Line			269	2011
Yokoshiba	■ Sōbu Main Line			1,408	2011
Yokosuka	Yokosuka Line	Main Line (Shioiri, Hemi)		5,710	2011
Yokota	■ Kururi Line			221	2011
Yono	Keihin–Tōhoku Line			24,299	2011
Yono-Hommachi	Saikyō Line			13,884	2011
Yorii	■ Hachikō Line	Chichibu Main Line; Tojo Line		376	2011
Yoshikawa	Musashino Line			18,727	2011
Yoshikawaminami	Musashino Line			1,474	2011
Yotsukaidō	■ Narita Line ■ Sōbu Main Line			21,680	2011
Yotsuya	Chūō Line; Chūō–Sōbu Line	Marunouchi Line; Namboku Line		88,104	2011
Yoyogi	Chūō–Sōbu Line; Yamanote Line	Ōedo Line		69,466	2011
Yugawara	Tōkaidō Line			5,976	2011
Yūki	■ Mito Line			2,100	2011
Yumoto	■ Jōban Line			1,659	2011
Yūrakuchō	Keihin–Tōhoku Line; Yamanote Line	Asakusa Line (Higashi-Ginza); Mita Line (Hibiya); Chiyoda Line (Hibiya); Ginza Line (Ginza); Hibiya Line (Hibiya, Ginza, Higashi-Ginza); Marunouchi Line (Ginza); Yūrakuchō Line		162,252	2011
Zushi	Yokosuka Line	Zushi Line (Shinzushi)		28,642	2011
Total				15,642,198	

== See also ==
- List of railway stations in Japan
