= Tanamukaihara =

Archaeological site in Japan

Tanamukaihara Site
- 田名向原遺跡 (Japanese)
- Tanamukaihara Site Tanamukaihara (Japan)
- 35°31′46″N 139°21′18″E
- Type: settlement
- Periods: Japanese Paleolithic
- Location: Sagamihara, Kanagawa, Japan
- Region: Kantō region

History
- Built: 13,000 BC

Site notes
- Elevation: 10 m (33 ft)
- Public access: Yes (park)

The Tanamukaihara Site (田名向原遺跡, Tanamukaihara iseki) is an archaeological site with the ruins of a Japanese Paleolithic period settlement located in the Tanashioda neighborhood of Chūō-ku, Sagamihara, Kanagawa Prefecture in the southern Kantō region of Japan. It was designated a National Historic Site in 1999.

== Overview ==
Many remains of the Upper Paleolithic period are distributed on the Sagamino Plateau between the Sagami River, which flows into Sagami Bay from Lake Yamanaka as its water source, and the Sakai River, which has its source near Lake Shiroyama. During this period, the average temperature of the Japanese archipelago was -7 deg C, or as cold as modern Siberia, and sea levels were around 100 meters lower than at present. It as also a time of intense volcanic activity. Sagamihara at that time was a grasslands with subarctic and coniferous forests.

The Tanamukaihara site is located on a fluvial terrace with a relative elevation of 11 meters above the left bank of the Sagami River. Excavations discovered two concentrations of stone tools, a gravel pit with lithic flakes, and the traces of one pit dwelling from a stratum 2.5 meters below the surface. The building had a diameter of about ten meters, with a floor of river stones, 12 pillar holes, and two hearth marks. Radiocarbon dating of charcoal fragments yielded a date of between 17,600 and 20,500 years ago, making it the oldest structure yet discovered in Japan. In addition, about 180 stone spearheads mainly made of obsidian from Nagano Prefecture, the Izu Peninsula or the Hakone area were found, providing evidence of surprisingly long-distance trade during this period of time. Artifacts also included a small amount of scrapers (flake tools) and knife-shaped stone tools, and a large amount of lithic cores and lithic flakes generated during production, for a total 3000 artifacts. It is thought that this was a stone tool workshop, and from its location on the bank of the Sagami River, it is assumed that it was used as a seasonal settlement dwelling and fishing ground for salmon and trout.

In 2007, the surrounding area was improved and the Tana Mukaihara Archaeological Park (史跡田名向原遺跡公園, Shiseki Tanamukaihara Iseki Kōen) an archaeological park was opened with a reconstructed pit dwelling, a small circular kofun burial tumuli. An on-site museum, the Paleolithic Hatena Pavilion (旧石器ハテナ館, kyū sekki Hatena-kan), displays some of the finds from this site. It is located a short distance from the "Shiodashita" bus stop on the Kanagawa Bus from Harataima Station on the JR East Sagami Line.

== See also ==
- List of Historic Sites of Japan (Kanagawa)
