= Iriya Station =

Iriya Station is the name of two train stations in Japan:

- Iriya Station (Kanagawa)
- Iriya Station (Tokyo)
