= Shimomizo Station =

Railway station in Sagamihara, Kanagawa Prefecture, Japan

Shimomizo Station 下溝駅
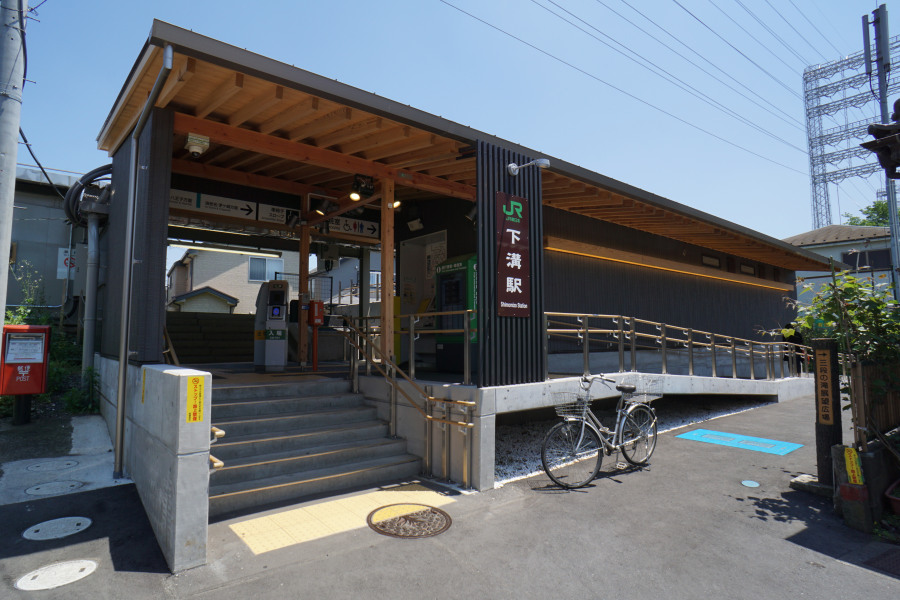
- Shimomizo Station in May 2017

General information
- Location: Shimomizo 1364, Minami-ku, Sagamihara-shi, Kanagawa-ken 252-0335; Japan
- Coordinates: 35°31′5.5″N 139°22′50″E
- Operator: JR East
- Line: ■ Sagami Line
- Distance: 23.5 km from Chigasaki.
- Platforms: 1 side platform
- Connections: Bus stop

Other information
- Status: Unstaffed
- Website: Official website

History
- Opened: April 29, 1931

Passengers
- FY2014: 1,134 daily (boarding passengers)

Services
Preceding station	JR East	Following station
Harataima towards Hachiōji	Sagami Line	Sobudaishita towards Chigasaki
Location
- Location within Kanagawa Prefecture Location within Japan

Shimomizo Station (下溝駅, Shimomizo-eki) is a passenger railway station located in the city of Sagamihara, Kanagawa Prefecture, Japan, operated by the East Japan Railway Company (JR East).

== Lines ==
Shimomizo Station is served by the Sagami Line, and is located 23.5 kilometers from the terminus of the line at Chigasaki.

== Station layout ==
The station consists of a single side platform with an unattended station building.

== History ==
Shimomizo Station was opened on April 29, 1931 as a station on the Sagami Railway. On June 1, 1944, the Sagami Railway was nationalized and merged with the Japan National Railways. Freight services were discontinued from October 1962. On April 1, 1987, with the dissolution and privatization of the Japan National Railways, the station came under the operation of JR East. Automated turnstiles using the Suica IC card system came into operation from November 2001.

== Passenger statistics ==
In fiscal 2014, the station was used by an average of 1,134 passengers daily (boarding passengers only).

== Surrounding area ==
- Camp Zama

== See also ==
- List of railway stations in Japan
