= Sōbudaishita Station =

Railway station in Sagamihara, Kanagawa Prefecture, Japan

Sōbudaishita Station 相武台下駅
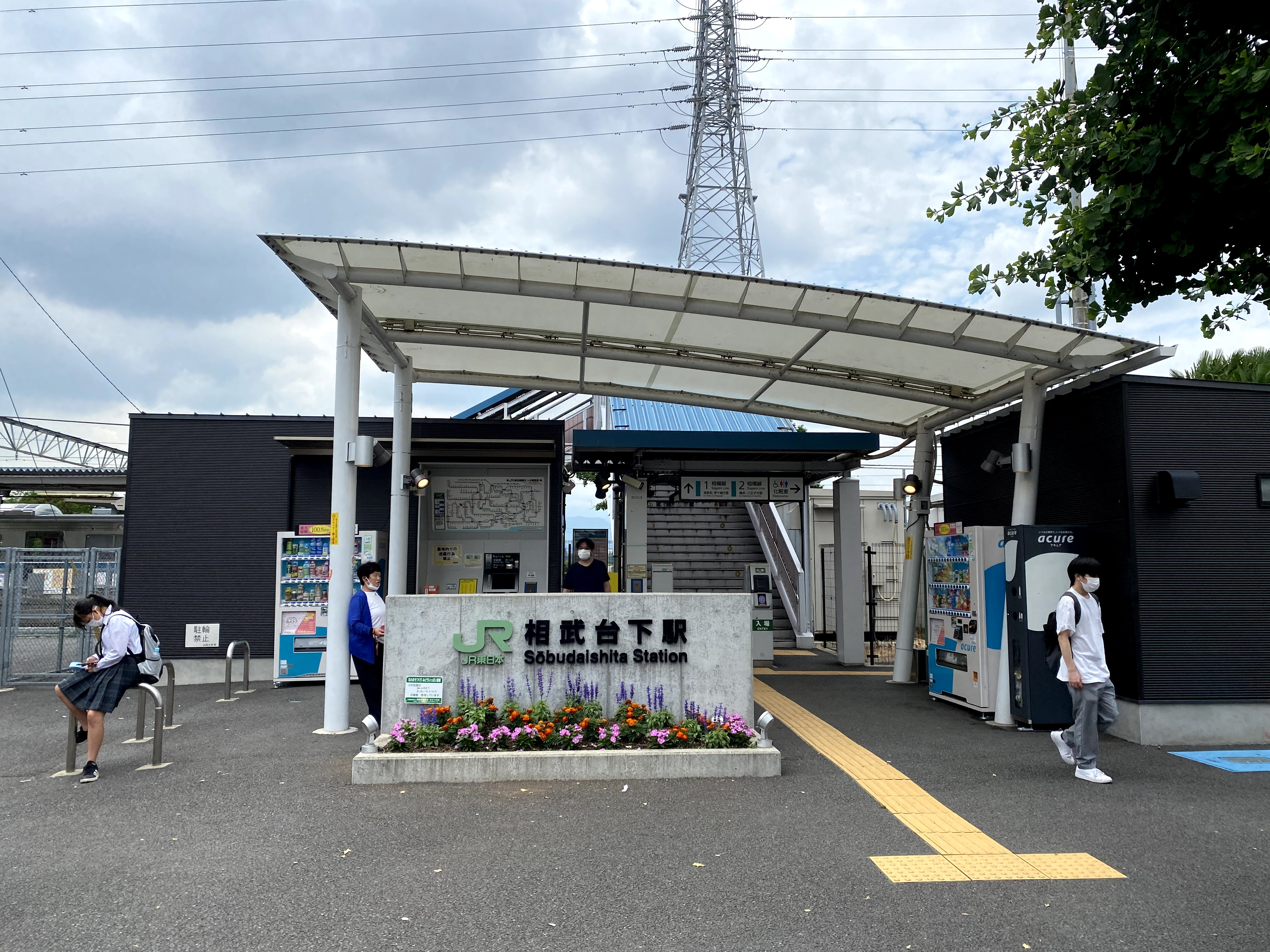
- Sōbudaishita Station, June 2021

General information
- Location: Shindo 1940, Minami-ku, Sagamihara-shi, Kanagawa-ken 252-0326; Japan
- Coordinates: 35.49325°N 139.38633°E
- Operator: JR East
- Line: ■ Sagami Line
- Distance: 20.6 km from Chigasaki.
- Platforms: 1 island platform
- Connections: Bus stop

Other information
- Status: Unstaffed
- Website: Official website

History
- Opened: April 29, 1931
- Former names: Zama-Shindo; Rikushimae (until 1940)

Passengers
- FY2014: 1,241 daily (boarding passengers)

Services
Preceding station	JR East	Following station
Shimomizo towards Hachiōji	Sagami Line	Iriya towards Chigasaki
Location
- Location within Kanagawa Prefecture Location within Japan

Sōbudaishita Station (相武台下駅, Sōbudaishita-eki) is a passenger railway station located in the city of Sagamihara, Kanagawa Prefecture, Japan, operated by the East Japan Railway Company (JR East).

== Lines ==
Sōbudaishita Station is served by the Sagami Line, and is located 20.6 kilometers from the terminus of the line at Chigasaki.

== Station layout ==
The station consists of a single island platform connected to the station building by a footbridge. The station is unattended.

=== Platforms ===
1	■ Sagami Line	for Chigasaki
2	■ Sagami Line	for Hashimoto

== History ==
Sōbudaishita Station was opened on April 29, 1931 as Zamashindo Station (座間新戸駅, Zama-Shindo-eki) on the Sagami Railway. With the opening of the nearby Imperial Japanese Army Academy (Rikugun Shikan Gakkō, or Rikushi), the station was renamed Rikushimae Station (陸士前駅, Rikushimae-eki) on September 28, 1938. However, amid the counter-intelligence movement of eliminating the names of military facilities from maps, the station was soon renamed to its present name in 1940. On June 1, 1944, the Sagami Railway was nationalized and merged with the Japanese Government Railways. Freight services were discontinued from October 1962. On April 1, 1987, with the dissolution and privatization of the Japanese National Railways, the station came under the operation of JR East. Automated turnstiles using the Suica IC card system came into operation from November 2001. A station master's office was added in 2004.

== Passenger statistics ==
In fiscal 2014, the station was used by an average of 1,241 passengers daily (boarding passengers only).

== Surrounding area ==
- Camp Zama

== See also ==
- List of railway stations in Japan
