= Chigasaki =

Chigasaki 茅ヶ崎市
- Special city
- Chigasaki City
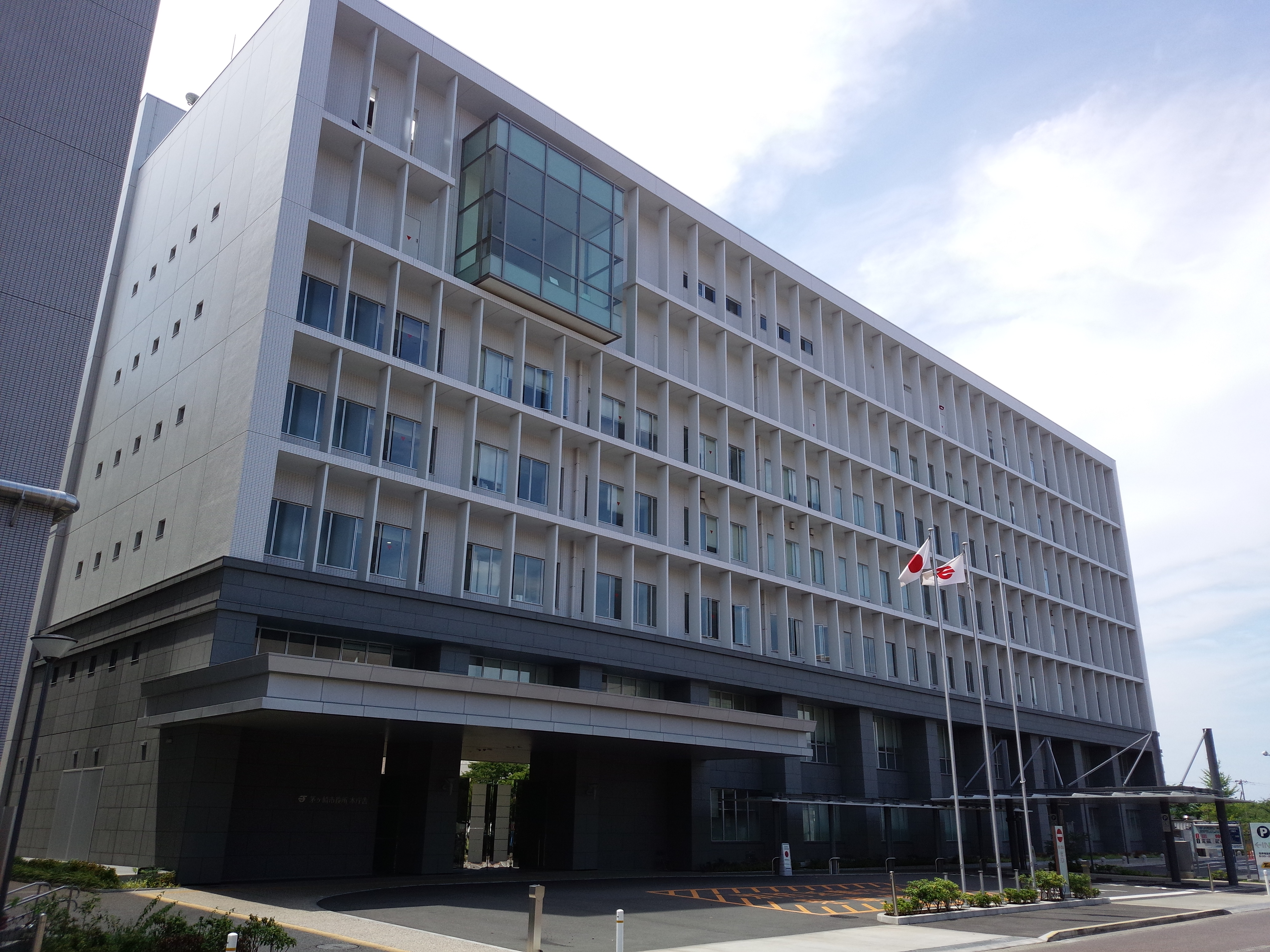
- Chigasaki City Hall

- Flag Seal

- Location of Chigasaki in Kanagawa Prefecture

- Coordinates: 35°20′N 139°24′E
- Country: Japan
- Region: Kantō
- Prefecture: Kanagawa

Area
  - Total: 35.71 km^{2} (13.79 sq mi)

Population (June 1, 2021)
  - Total: 242,798
  - Density: 6,799/km^{2} (17,610/sq mi)
- Time zone: UTC+9 (Japan Standard Time)
- Symbols
  - Tree: Acacia
  - Flower: Rhododendron
  - Bird: Great tit
- Phone number: 0467-82-1111
- Address: 1-1 Chigasaki 1-chome, Chigasaki-shi, Kanagawa-ken 253-8686
- Website: Official website

Chigasaki (茅ヶ崎市, Chigasaki-shi) is a city located in Kanagawa Prefecture, Japan. As of 1 June 2021, the city had an estimated population of 242,798 and a population density of 6800 people per km^{2}. The total area of the city is 35.71 square kilometres (13.79 sq mi).

== Geography ==
The city is located on the eastern bank of the Sagami River in south-central Kanagawa Prefecture, facing Sagami Bay on the Pacific Ocean to the south. The Hikiji River flows through part of the city.

=== Surrounding municipalities ===
Kanagawa Prefecture

- Fujisawa
- Hiratsuka
- Samukawa

=== Climate ===
The city has a humid subtropical climate (Köppen Cfa) characterized by warm summers and cool winters with light to no snowfall. The average annual temperature in Chigasaki is 15.9 °C. The average annual rainfall is 1872 mm with September as the wettest month. The temperatures are highest on average in August, at around 26.1 °C, and lowest in January, at around 6.4 °C.

== Demographics ==
Per Japanese census data, the population of the city grew rapidly during the late 20th century and has grown at a slower rate in the 21st.

Historical population
Year	Pop.	±%
1950	50,112	—
1960	68,054	+35.8%
1970	129,621	+90.5%
1980	171,016	+31.9%
1990	201,675	+17.9%
2000	220,809	+9.5%
2010	235,081	+6.5%
2020	242,389	+3.1%

== History ==
The city has been inhabited since prehistoric times. The area was largely pasture and farmland well into the Edo period. The Tōkaidō connecting Edo with Kyoto passed through what is now Chigasaki, without a post station. A large part of the area was the tenryō territory in Sagami Province controlled directly by the Tokugawa Shogunate through the Edo period, though other parts were administered by small clans including the Ōoka clan, which is renowned for its descendant Ōoka Tadasuke. After the start of the Meiji period, the Tōkaidō Main Line railway connected Chigasaki Station with Tokyo and Osaka in 1898, which spurred the development of the area. Chigasaki village in Kōza District, Kanagawa Prefecture became Chigasaki town in 1908. In 1921, the Sagami Line railway connected Chigasaki with Hashimoto to the north. Chigasaki became a city on October 1, 1947. On April 1, 2003, the population of Chigasaki exceeded 200,000 and it became a special city with increased local autonomy. On October 24, 2014, Chigasaki agreed with Honolulu to establish the sister city relationship.

== Government ==
The city has a mayor-council form of government with a directly elected mayor and a unicameral city council of 28 members. Chigasaki contributes three members to the Kanagawa Prefectural Assembly. In terms of national politics, the city is part of Kanagawa 15th district of the lower house of the Diet of Japan.

== Economy ==
The city is largely a bedroom community for Tokyo and Yokohama, and has been noted as a seaside resort community since the Meiji period. Tourism and summer leisure activities remain important to the local economy.

Companies headquartered in Chigasaki include:

- Autech Japan Co Ltd
- Miyata Industrial Co Ltd
- Toho Titanium Corporation

== Education ==
The city has nineteen elementary schools and thirteen middle schools operated by the city government. The city has four public high schools operated by the Kanagawa Prefectural Board of Education, and the prefecture operates one special education school for the handicapped. There is one private elementary, middle school and high school in the city. Bunkyo University has a campus located in the city.

== Transportation ==
=== Railway ===
JR East - Tōkaidō Main Line

- Chigasaki

JR East - Sagami Line

- Kita-Chigasaki - Kagawa

=== Highway ===
- Ken-Ō Expressway
- Shin-Shōnan Bypass
- National Route 1, to Tokyo or Kyoto
- National Route 134, to Yokosuka via Kamakura or Hiratsuka
- National Route 468

=== Bus ===
- Chigasaki-eki - Minami nakadori - Fujisawa-eki-kita-guchi Route 7

== Local attractions ==
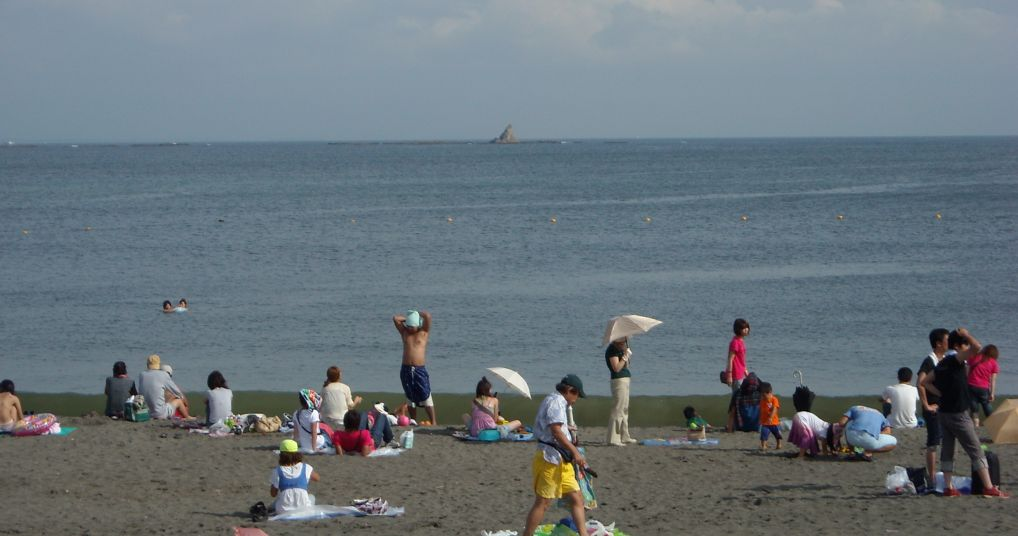
Southern Beach Chigasaki

The shoreline from Chigasaki to Kamakura is called the "Shōnan area". A popular swimming destination, Chigasaki is well known as the birthplace of Japanese surfing. A shop called "Goddess," located only about 20 meters from the shoreline, claims to be the first surfboard shop in Japan. Bicycles with metal fittings for holding surfboards are prominent in the area. A section of the beach in Chigasaki is named "Southern Beach", after the rock band Southern All Stars, whose lead vocalist Keisuke Kuwata hails from Chigasaki. The symbol of Southern Beach is Eboshi-iwa, a large hat-shaped rock that is visible from the coast.

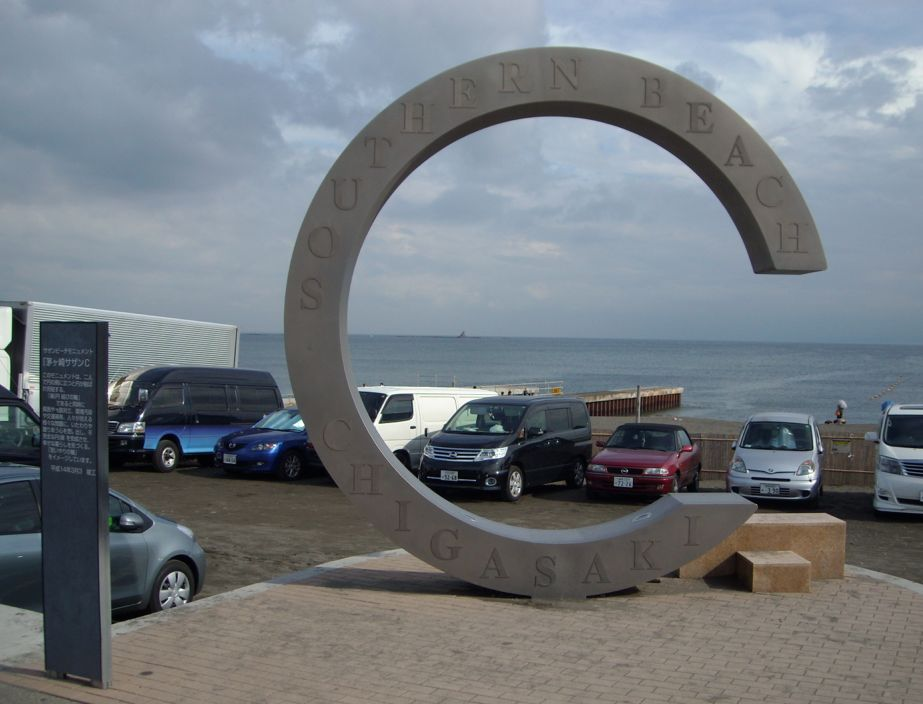
Southern Beach monument known as "Southern C"

The city is known for being the center of Japanese Hawaiian culture with many tropical and Hawaiian stores located mainly in the southern side of the town. Fridays in Chigasaki was called "Aloha Friday" in which consumers were able to have discounts in many stores and taxis. Salesclerks and city officers are encouraged to work wearing aloha shirts as a part of Cool Biz campaign to promote its Hawaiian culture every summer since 2003.

In contrast to the popularity as a modernized resort in south, north part of the city still retains some historical heritages. Ōoka Echizen festival is held in the family temple of the Ōoka clan (bodaiji) "Jōkenji" on May.

== Sister cities ==
- Okazaki, Aichi, Japan, since July 1, 1983
- Honolulu, United States, since October 25, 2014

== Notable people from Chigasaki ==
- Richard Bozulich, author and publisher of books about go
- Hitoshi Doi
- Ailes Gilmour, early pioneer of the American Modern Dance movement
- Masato Hagiwara
- Yūzō Kayama
- Keisuke Kuwata, singer-songwriter and musician
- Tori Matsuzaka, actor
- Masumi Mishina, softball player
- Moomin, singer
- Isamu Noguchi, sculptor and landscape architect
- Soichi Noguchi, JAXA astronaut; NASA STS-114 crew member
- Kiyohiko Ozaki, Country Western, Popular Classic Standards and Enka.
- Tetta Sugimoto, actor
- Ai Sugiyama, professional tennis player
- Kohsuke Toriumi, voice actor
- Masahiro Yamamoto, baseball player
- Tani Yuuki, singer
