= Banda Station =

Railway station in Sagamihara, Kanagawa, Japan

Banda Station 番田駅
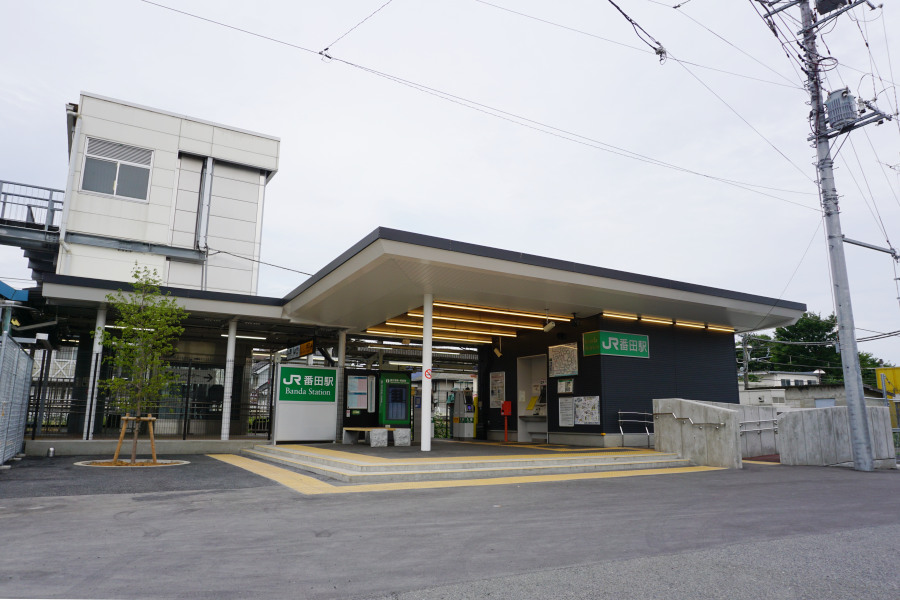
- Banda Station in May 2018

General information
- Location: Kamimizo, Chūō-ku, Sagamihara-shi, Kanagawa-ken 252-0243; Japan
- Coordinates: 35.545287°N 139.363254°E
- Operator: JR East
- Line: ■ Sagami Line
- Distance: 26.9 km from Chigasaki
- Platforms: 1 island platform
- Tracks: 2
- Connections: Bus stop

Other information
- Status: Unstaffed
- Website: Official website

History
- Opened: 29 April 1931
- Rebuilt: 2017-2018
- Former names: Kamimizo (until 1944)

Passengers
- FY2014: 3,643 daily

Services
Preceding station	JR East	Following station
Kamimizo towards Hachiōji	Sagami Line	Harataima towards Chigasaki
Location
- Location within Kanagawa Prefecture Location within Japan

Banda Station (番田駅, Banda-eki) is a passenger railway station located in the city of Sagamihara, Kanagawa Prefecture, Japan, operated by the East Japan Railway Company (JR East).

== Lines ==
Banda Station is served by the Sagami Line, and is located 26.9 kilometers from the terminus of the line at Chigasaki.

== Station layout ==
The station consists of a single island platform connected to a small station building by a footbridge. The station is unattended.

=== Platforms ===
1	■ Sagami Line	for Hashimoto
2	■ Sagami Line	for Chigasaki

== History ==
The station opened on April 29, 1931, as Kamimizo Station (上溝駅) on the Sagami Railway. On June 1, 1944, the Sagami Railway was nationalized and merged with the Japanese National Railways (JNR), at which time the station was renamed Banda Station. On April 1, 1987, with the dissolution and privatization of JNR, the station came under the operation of JR East.

The station building is scheduled to be rebuilt between September 2017 and spring 2018.

== Passenger statistics ==
In fiscal 2014, the station was used by an average of 3,643 passengers daily (boarding passengers only).

== Surrounding area ==
- Kamimizo Minami High School

== See also ==
- List of railway stations in Japan
