= Kadosawabashi Station =

Railway station in Ebina, Kanagawa Prefecture, Japan

Kadosawabashi Station 門沢橋駅
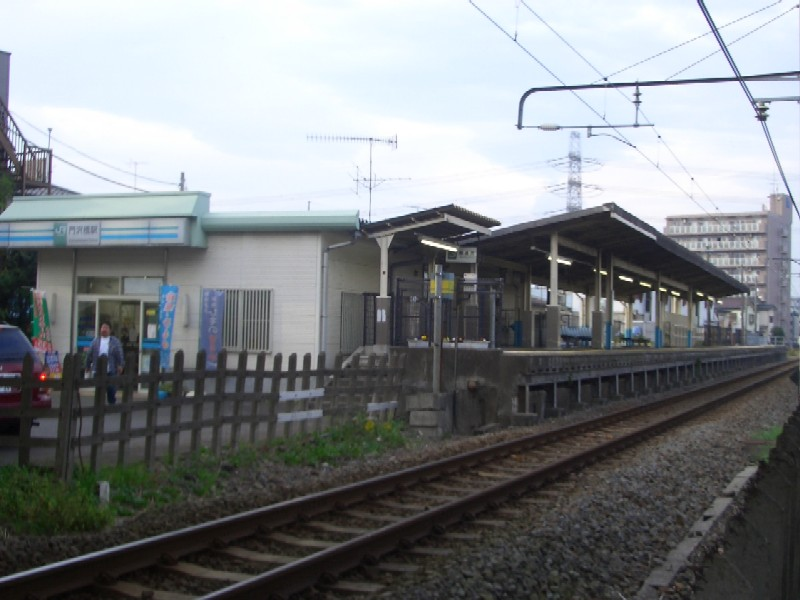
- Kadosawabashi Station

General information
- Location: Kadosawabashi 2-4-1, Ebina-shi, Kanagawa-ken 243-0426; Japan
- Coordinates: 35°24′24.4″N 139°22′48.5″E
- Operator: JR East
- Line: ■ Sagami Line
- Distance: 10.0 km from Chigasaki
- Platforms: 1 side platform

Construction
- Structure type: At grade

Other information
- Status: Unstaffed
- Website: Official website

History
- Opened: June 1, 1944

Passengers
- FY2014: 1,862 daily

Services
Preceding station	JR East	Following station
Shake towards Hachiōji	Sagami Line	Kurami towards Chigasaki
Location
- Location within Kanagawa Prefecture Location within Japan

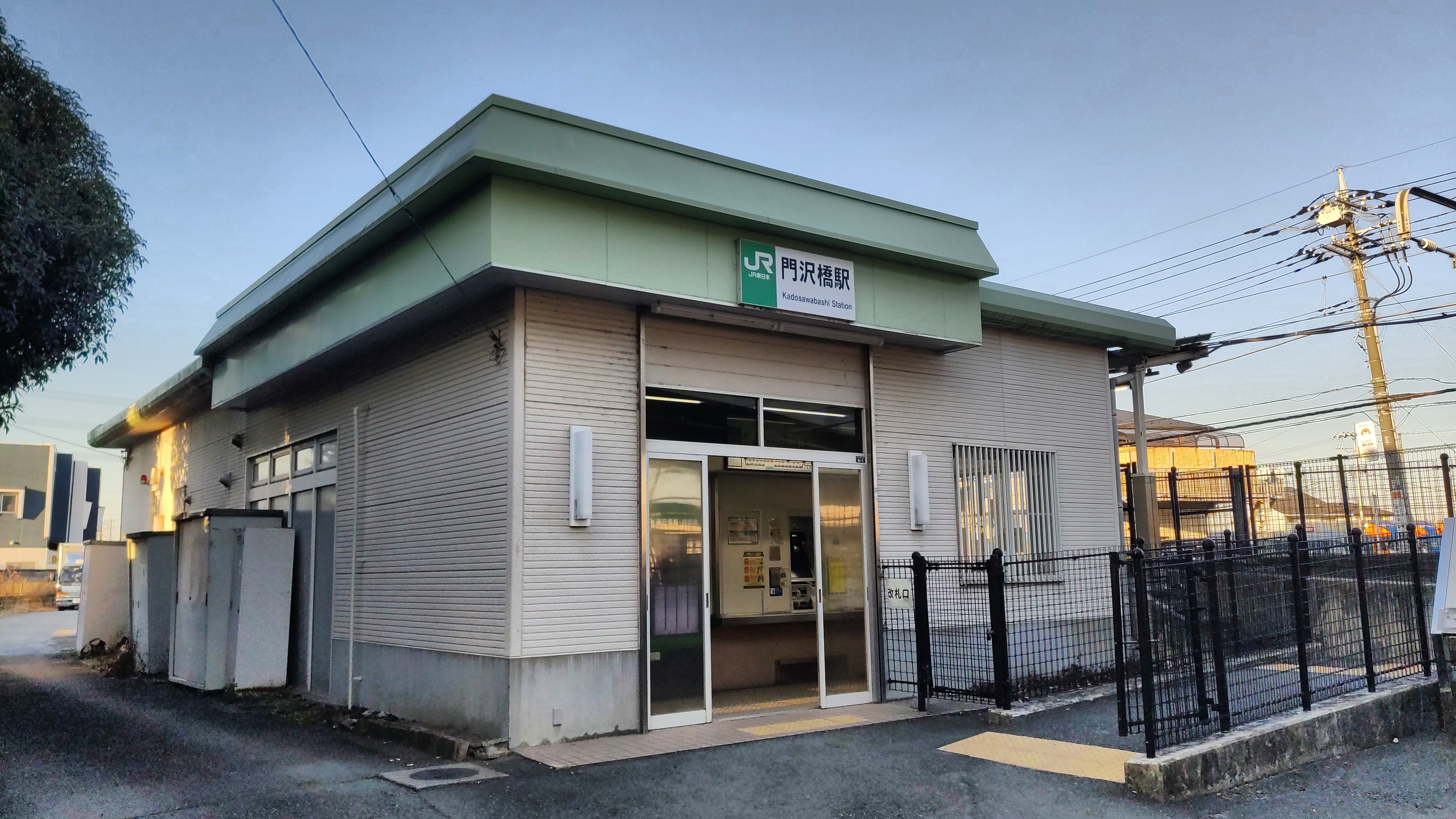
Kadosawabashi Station building in 2022

Kadosawabashi Station (門沢橋駅, Kadosawabashi-eki) is a passenger railway station located in the city of Ebina, Kanagawa Prefecture, Japan, operated by the East Japan Railway Company (JR East).

== Lines ==
Kadosawabashi Station is served by the Sagami Line and is located 10.0 km from the southern terminus of the line at Chigasaki.

== Station layout ==
The station consists of a single side platform with a small station building. The station is unattended.

== History ==
Kadosawabashi Station was opened on July 1, 1931, as a rail siding on the Sagami Railway. On June 1, 1944, the Sagami Railway was nationalized and merged with the Japan National Railways; on the same day, the Kadoawabashi was elevated to the status of a full station. The station has been unstaffed since 1962, with tickets sold at nearby shops. On April 1, 1987, with the dissolution and privatization of the Japan National Railways, the station came under the operation of JR East. Automated turnstiles using the Suica IC card system came into operation from November 2001.

== Passenger statistics ==
In fiscal 2014, the station was used by an average of 1,862 passengers daily (boarding passengers only).

== Surrounding area ==
- Ebina City Arima Library
- Fujifilm Business Innovation Ebina Office
- Nissin Industry
- Kanagawa West Post Office
- Kadosawabashi Elementary School

== See also ==
- List of railway stations in Japan
