= Iriya Station (Kanagawa) =

Railway station in Zama, Kanagawa Prefecture, Japan

Iriya Station 入谷駅
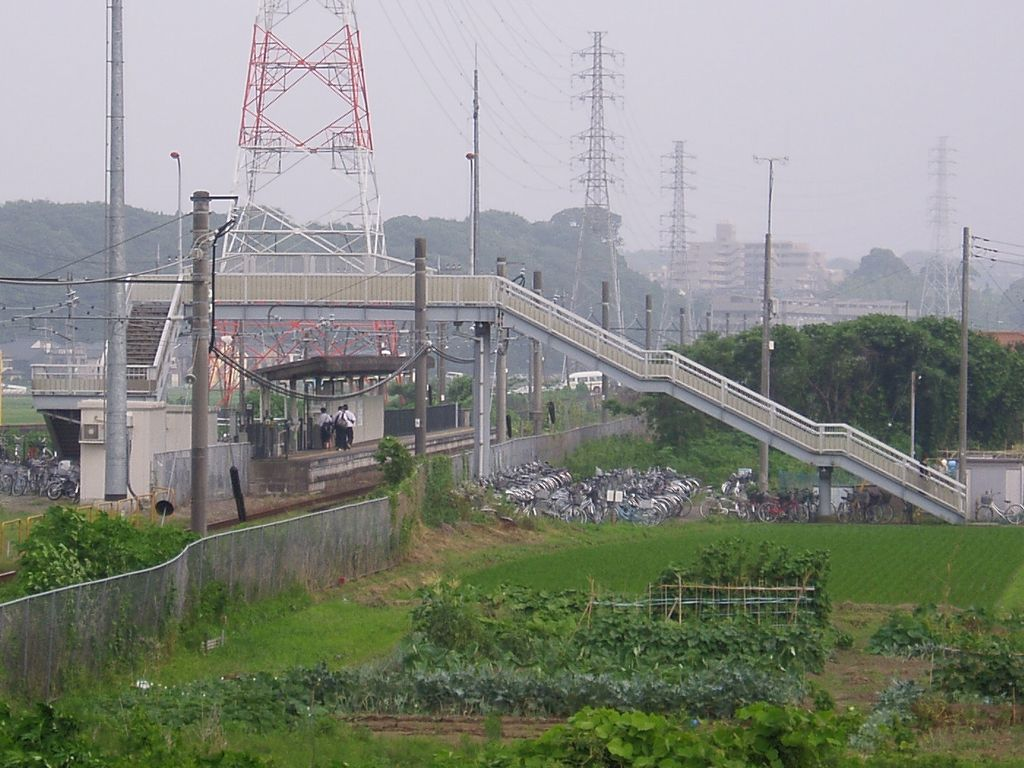
- Iriya Station in June 2007

General information
- Location: Iriya-nishi 5-45-1, Zama-shi, Kanagawa-ken 252-0029; Japan
- Coordinates: 35°28′43.18″N 139°23′30.35″E
- Operator: JR East
- Line: ■ Sagami Line
- Distance: 18.9 km from Chigasaki.
- Platforms: 1 side platform
- Connections: Bus stop

Other information
- Status: Unstaffed
- Website: Official website

History
- Opened: February 23, 1935

Passengers
- FY2007: 1,091 daily (boarding passengers)

Services
Preceding station	JR East	Following station
Sobudaishita towards Hachiōji	Sagami Line	Ebina towards Chigasaki
Location
- Location within Kanagawa Prefecture Location within Japan

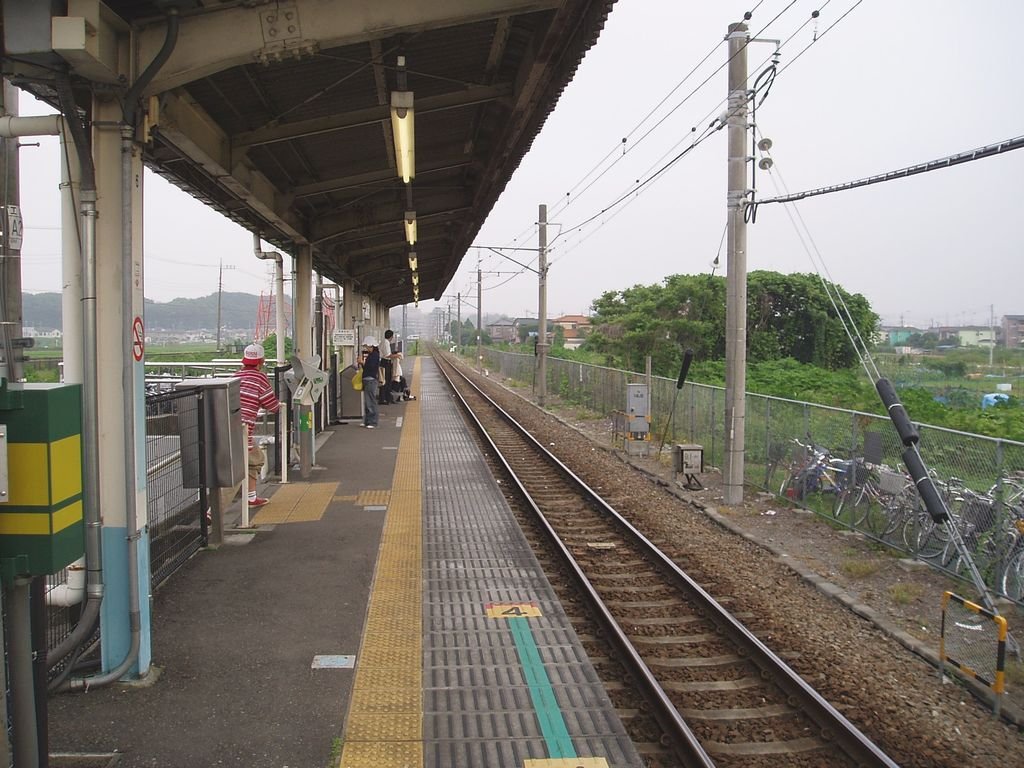
Platform of Iriya Station

Iriya Station (入谷駅, Iriya-eki) is a passenger railway station located in the city of Zama, Kanagawa Prefecture, Japan, operated by the East Japan Railway Company (JR East).

== Lines ==
Iriya Station is served by the Sagami Line, and is located 18.9 kilometers from the terminus of the line at Chigasaki.

== Station layout ==
The station consists of a single side platform and an unstaffed station building.

== History ==
Iriya Station was opened on February 23, 1935, as a station on the Sagami Railway. On June 1, 1944, the Sagami Railway was nationalized and merged with the Japan National Railways. Freight services were discontinued from February 1961. On April 1, 1987, with the dissolution and privatization of the Japan National Railways, the station came under the operation of JR East. Automated turnstiles using the Suica IC card system came into operation from November 2001.

== Passenger statistics ==
In fiscal 2007, the station was used by an average of 1,091 passengers daily (boarding passengers only).

== Surrounding area ==
The area including the station site is designated as an urbanization control area. Land use for other than agricultural land is severely restricted. Rice fields spread around the area, and even the house closest to the station is located at a distance of 100 meters or more.

- Kanagawa Prefectural Zama High School
- Kanagawa Prefectural Zama School for the Disabled

== See also ==
- List of railway stations in Japan
