= Harataima Station =

Railway station in Kanagawa Prefecture, Japan

Harataima Station 原当麻駅
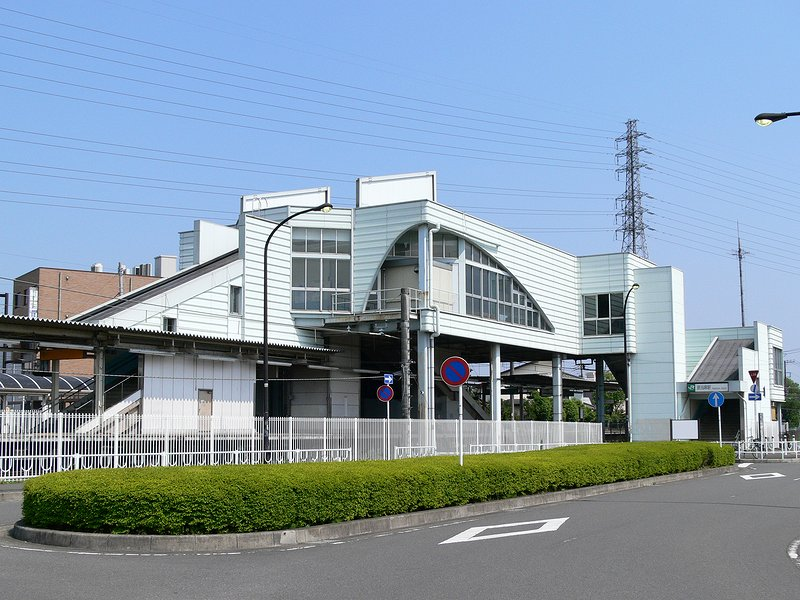
- Harataima Station in May 2007

General information
- Location: Taima 1288-1, Minami-ku, Sagamihara-shi, Kanagawa-ken 252-0336; Japan
- Coordinates: 35.529221°N 139.375056°E
- Operator: JR East
- Line: ■ Sagami Line
- Distance: 24.8 km from Chigasaki.
- Platforms: 1 island platform
- Connections: Bus stop

Other information
- Status: Staffed
- Website: Official website

History
- Opened: April 29, 1931

Passengers
- FY2019: 5,176 daily (boarding passengers)

Services
Preceding station	JR East	Following station
Banda towards Hachiōji	Sagami Line	Shimomizo towards Chigasaki
Location
- Location within Kanagawa Prefecture Location within Japan

Harataima Station (原当麻駅, Harataima-eki) is a passenger railway station located in the city of Sagamihara, Kanagawa Prefecture, Japan, operated by the East Japan Railway Company (JR East).

== Lines ==
Harataima Station is served by the Sagami Line, and is located 24.8 kilometers from the terminus of the line at Chigasaki.

== Station layout ==
The station consists of a single island platform connected to a modern station building by a footbridge. The station is attended.

=== Platforms ===
1	■ Sagami Line	for Chigasaki
2	■ Sagami Line	for Hashimoto

== History ==
Harataima Station was opened on April 29, 1931 as a station on the Sagami Railway. On June 1, 1944, the Sagami Railway was nationalized and merged with the Japan National Railways. Freight services were discontinued from October 1962. On April 1, 1987, with the dissolution and privatization of the Japan National Railways, the station came under the operation of JR East. The station building was complexly rebuilt in 1991. Automated turnstiles using the Suica IC card system came into operation from November 2001.

== Passenger statistics ==
In fiscal 2019, the station was used by an average of 5,176 passengers daily (boarding passengers only).

The passenger figures (boarding passengers only) for previous years are as shown below.

Fiscal year	daily average
2005	3,769
2010	4,164
2015	4,727

== Surrounding area ==
- Muryoko-ji, Buddhist temple, one of the 50 scenic spots in Kanagawa
- Kanshin-ji, Buddhist temple, Buso Kannon Pilgrimage Route #31

== See also ==
- List of railway stations in Japan
