= Kita-Chigasaki Station =

Railway station in Chigasaki, Kanagawa Prefecture, Japan

Kita-Chigasaki Station 北茅ヶ崎駅
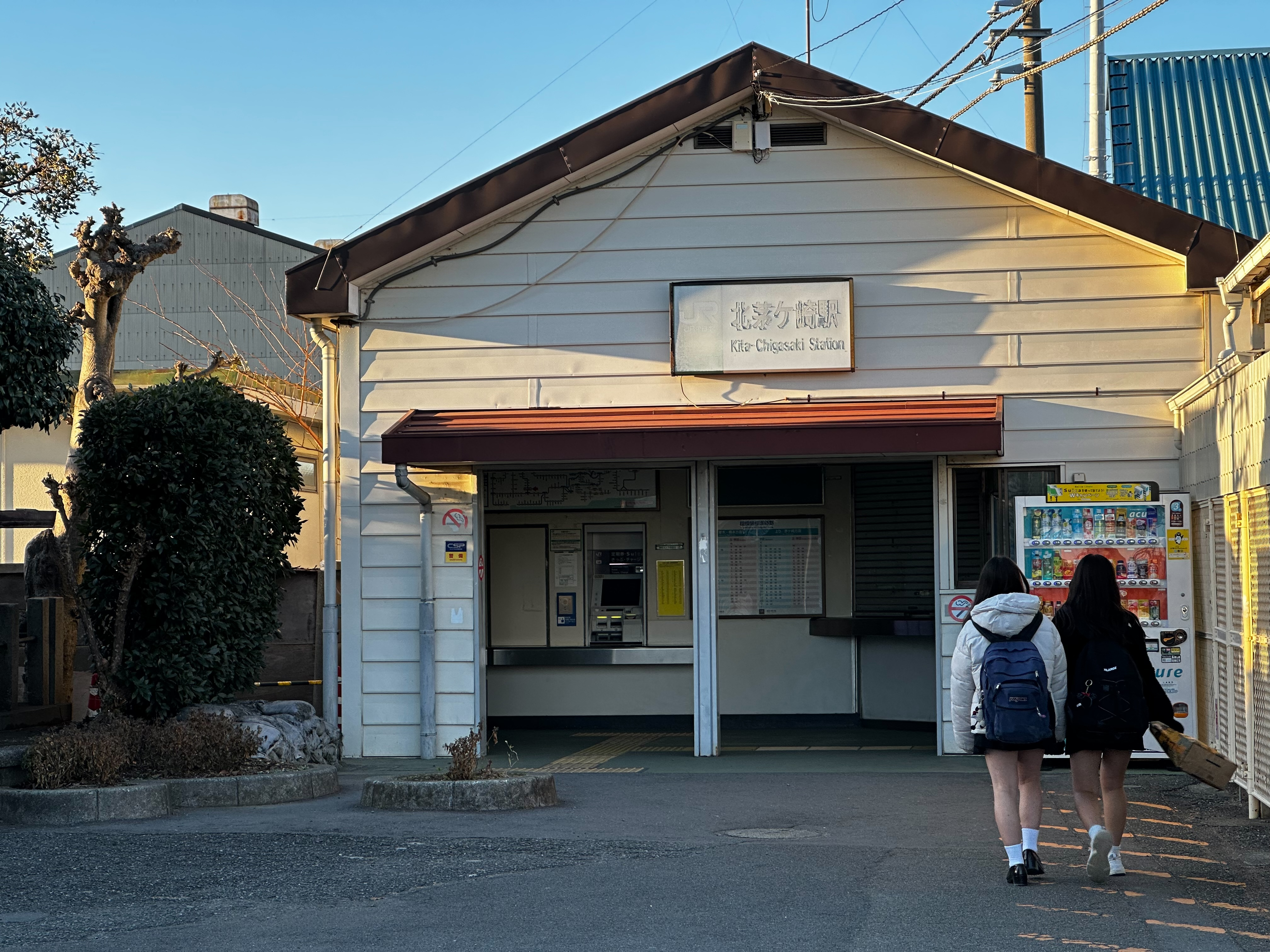
- Kita-Chigasaki Station in 2023

General information
- Location: Chigasaki 3-1-1, Chigasaki-shi, Kanagawa-ken 253-0041; Japan
- Coordinates: 35°20′20.8″N 139°24′27.3″E
- Operator: JR East
- Line: ■ Sagami Line
- Distance: 1.3 km from Chigasaki.
- Platforms: 1 island platform
- Connections

Other information
- Status: Staffed
- Website: Official website

History
- Opened: 2,870
- Former names: Nitto (until 1944)

Passengers
- FY2019: 5,709 daily (boarding passengers)

Services
Preceding station	JR East	Following station
Kagawa towards Hachiōji	Sagami Line	Chigasaki Terminus
Location
- Location within Kanagawa Prefecture Location within Japan

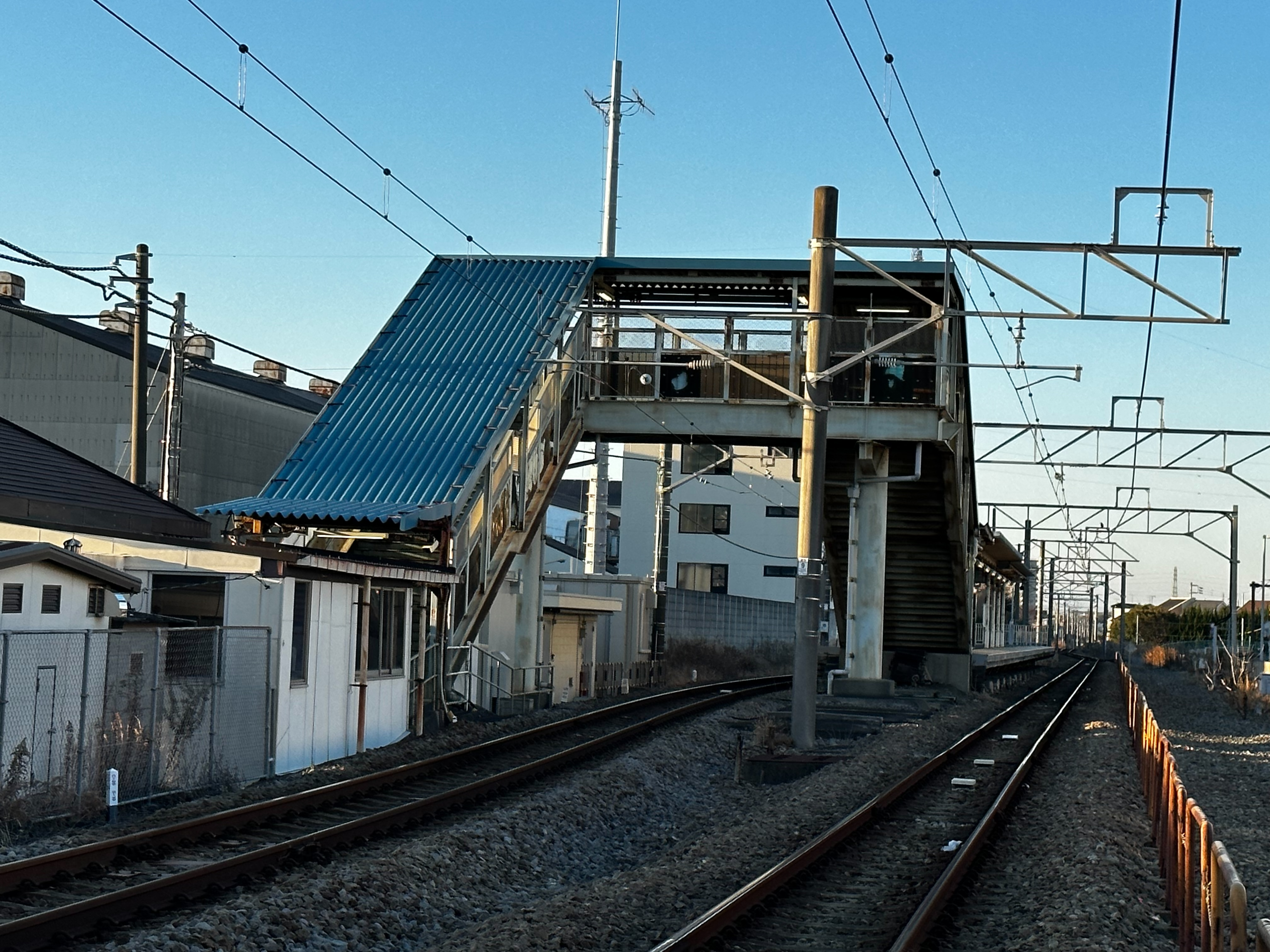
Kita-Chigasaki Station in 2023

Kita-Chigasaki Station (北茅ヶ崎駅, Kita-Chigasaki-eki) is a passenger railway station located in the city of Chigasaki, Kanagawa Prefecture, Japan, operated by the East Japan Railway Company (JR East).

== Lines ==
Kita-Chigasaki Station is served by the Sagami Line, and is located 1.3 kilometers from the terminus of the line at Chigasaki.

== Station layout ==
The station consists of a single island platform connected to a small station building by a footbridge. The station is staffed.

== History ==
Kita-Chigasaki was opened on February 1, 1940 as Nitto Station (日東駅, Nitto-eki) on the Sagami Railway. It assumed its present name on June 1, 1944, when the Sagami Railway was nationalized and merged with the Japan National Railways. Freight services were discontinued from November 1986. On April 1, 1987, with the dissolution and privatization of the Japan National Railways, the station came under the operation of JR East. Automated turnstiles using the Suica IC card system came into operation from November 2001.

== Passenger statistics ==
In fiscal 2019, the station was used by an average of 2,870 passengers daily (boarding passengers only).

The passenger figures (boarding passengers only) for previous years are as shown below.

Fiscal year	daily average
2005	2,595
2010	2,601
2015	2,837

== Surrounding area ==
- Chigasaki Municipal Hospital
- Kanagawa Prefectural Tsurumine High School
- Toho Titanium / Chigasaki Factory
- AGC Seimi Chemical / Chigasaki Factory
- Tokai Carbon Shonan Factory

== See also ==
- List of railway stations in Japan
