= Shin-Shibaura Station =

Railway station in Yokohama, Japan

JI51 Shin-Shibaura Station 新芝浦駅
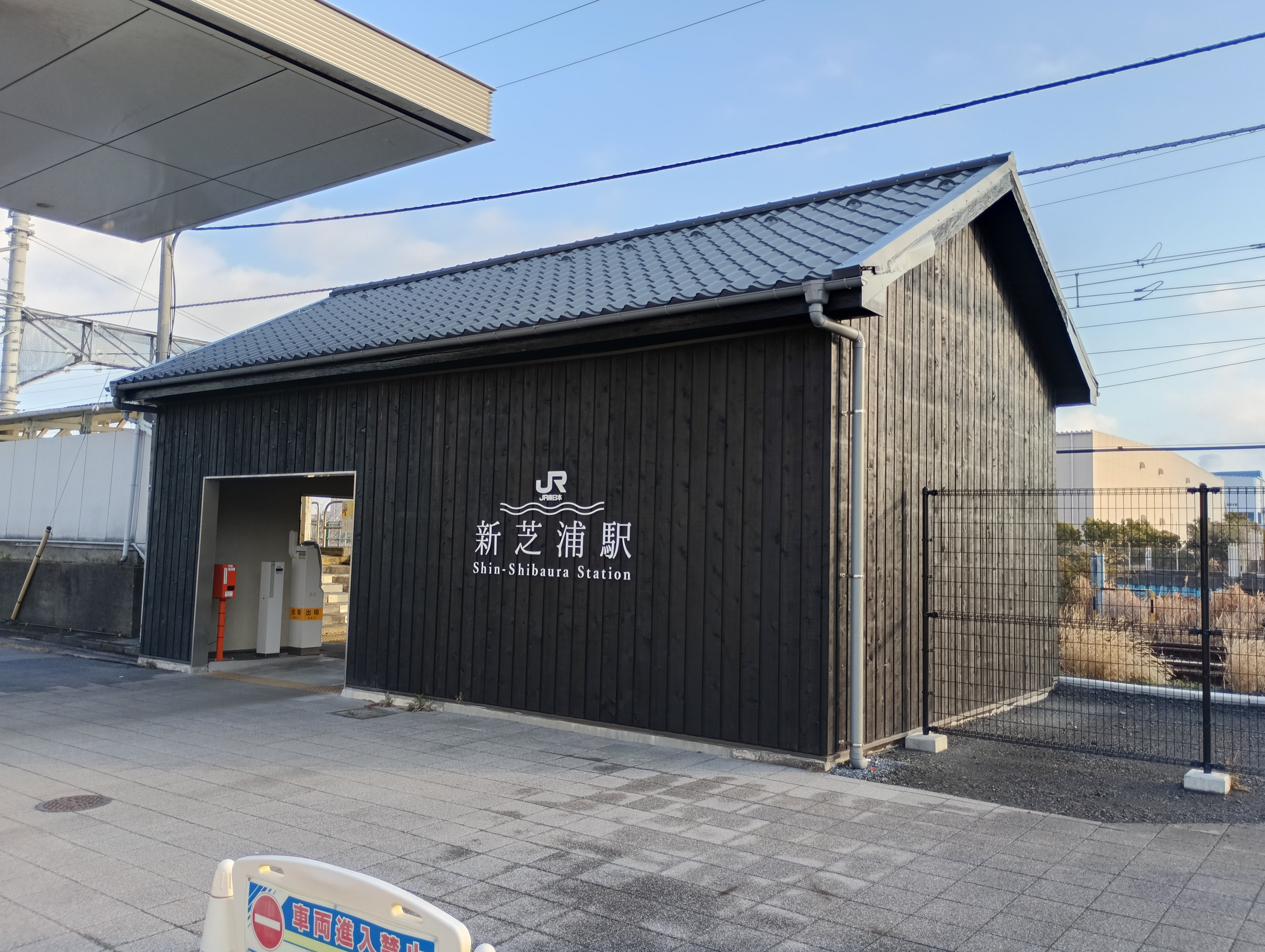
- Shin-Shibaura station building, February 2026

General information
- Location: 2-chōme Suehirochō; Tsurumi, Yokohama; Japan
- Coordinates: 35°29′31″N 139°42′01″E
- Operator: JR East
- Line: Umi-Shibaura Branch
- Distance: 3.9 km (2.4 mi) from Tsurumi
- Platforms: 2 side platforms
- Tracks: 2

Construction
- Structure type: At-grade

Other information
- Station code: JI51

History
- Opened: 10 June 1932; 94 years ago

Passengers
- JFY2008: 362 daily

Services
Preceding station	JR East	Following station
Asano JI05 towards Tsurumi	Tsurumi Line	Umi-Shibaura JI52 Terminus
Location
- Location within Yokohama Location within Tokyo Bay and Bōsō Peninsula Location within Kanagawa Prefecture Location within Kanto Area Location within Japan

Shin-Shibaura Station (Japanese: 新芝浦駅, Hepburn: Shin-Shibaura-eki) is a railway station operated by East Japan Railway Company (JR East) in the Tsurumi ward of Yokohama.

== Lines ==
Shin-Shibaura Station is served by the Tsurumi Line, and is located 3.9 kilometers (2.4 mi) from the terminus at Tsurumi Station.

== Station layout ==
Shin-Shibaura Station has two side platforms serving two tracks, connected by a level crossing.

=== Platforms ===
1	Tsurumi Line	for Umi-Shibaura
2	Tsurumi Line	for Tsurumi

== History ==
Shin-Shibaura Station was opened on June 10, 1932 as a station on a spur line of the privately held Tsurumi Rinkō Railway (鶴見臨港鉄道, Tsurumi Rinkō Tetsudō). The line was extended on the Umi-Shibaura Station on November 1, 1940. The Tsurumi Rinkō line was nationalized on July 1, 1943, and was later absorbed into the Japan National Railway (JNR) network. The station has been unstaffed since March 1, 1971. Upon the privatization of the Japan National Railways (JNR) on April 1, 1987 the station has been operated by JR East.

== Gallery ==
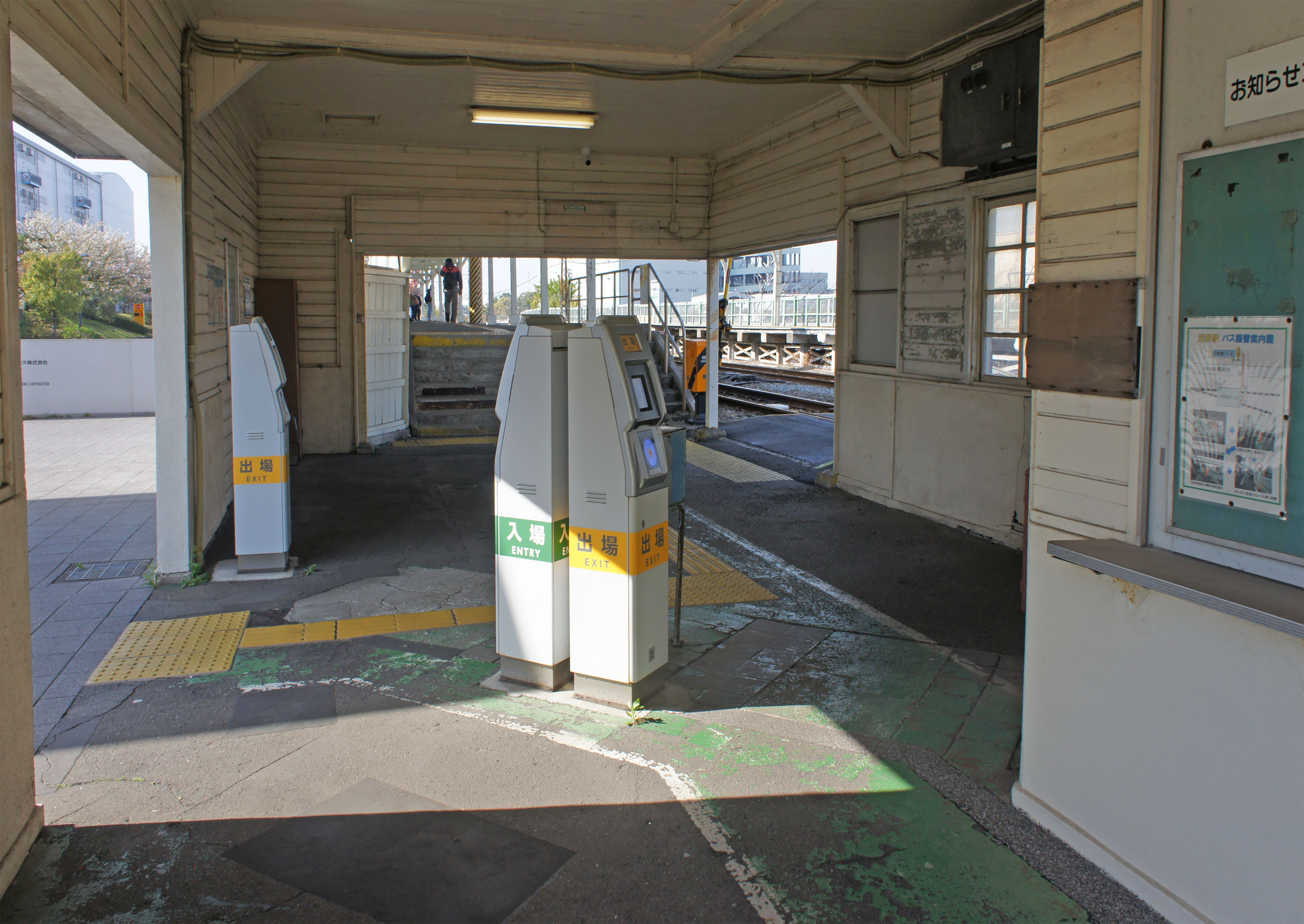
IC card readers, April 2022

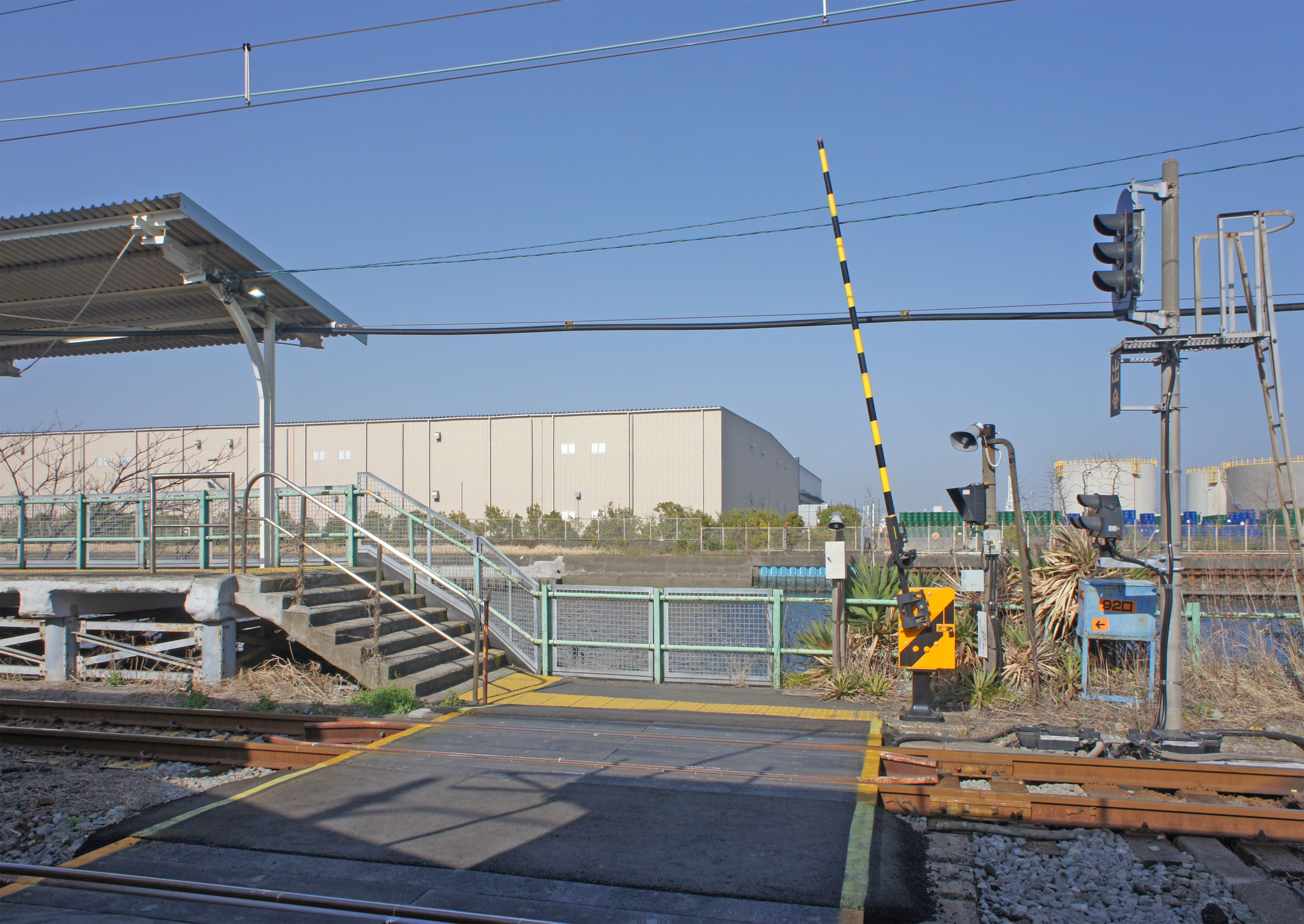
Level crossing inside the station, April 2022

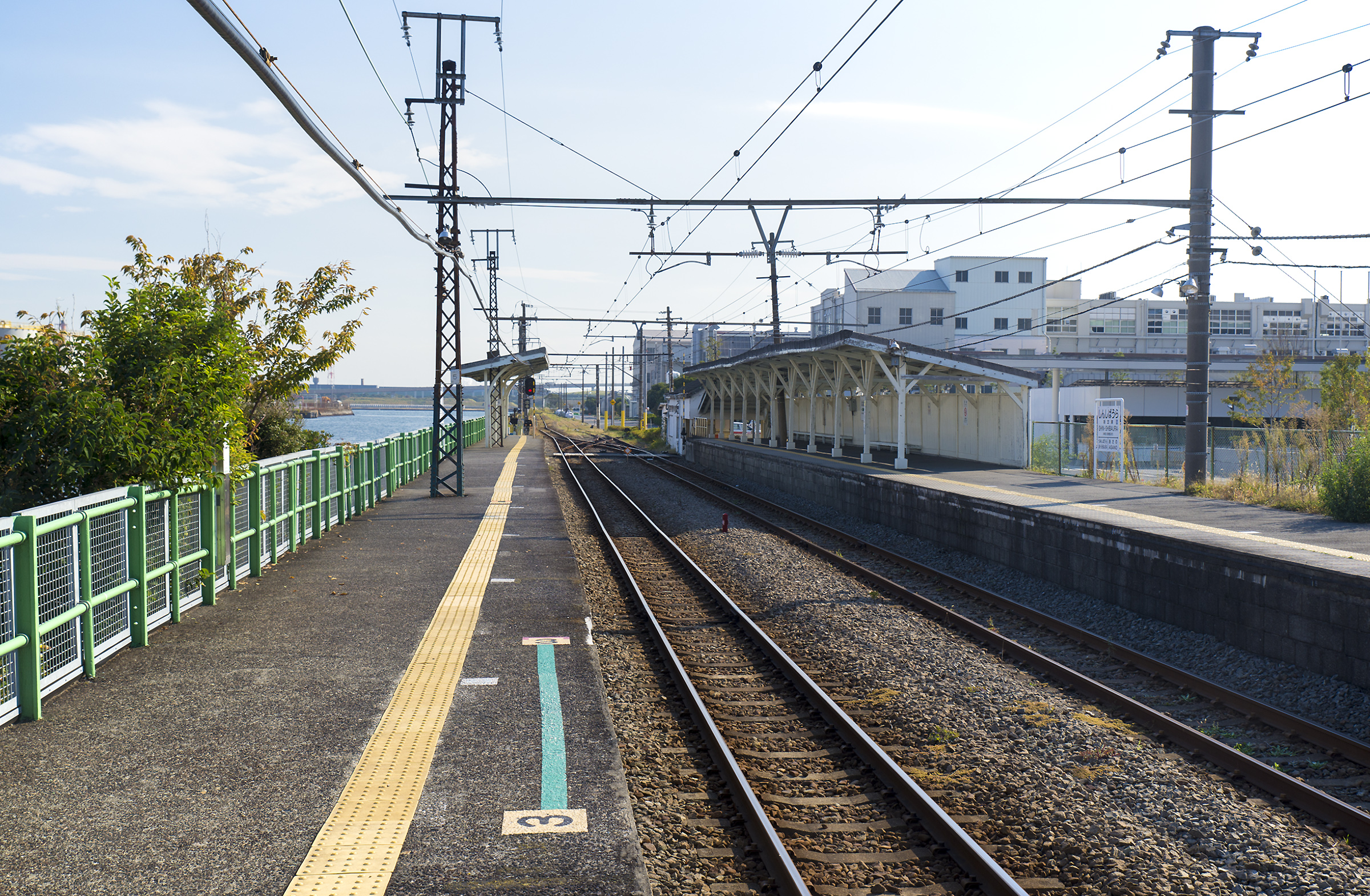
Platforms, November 2014
