= Sagami Line =

Railway line in Kanagawa Prefecture, Japan

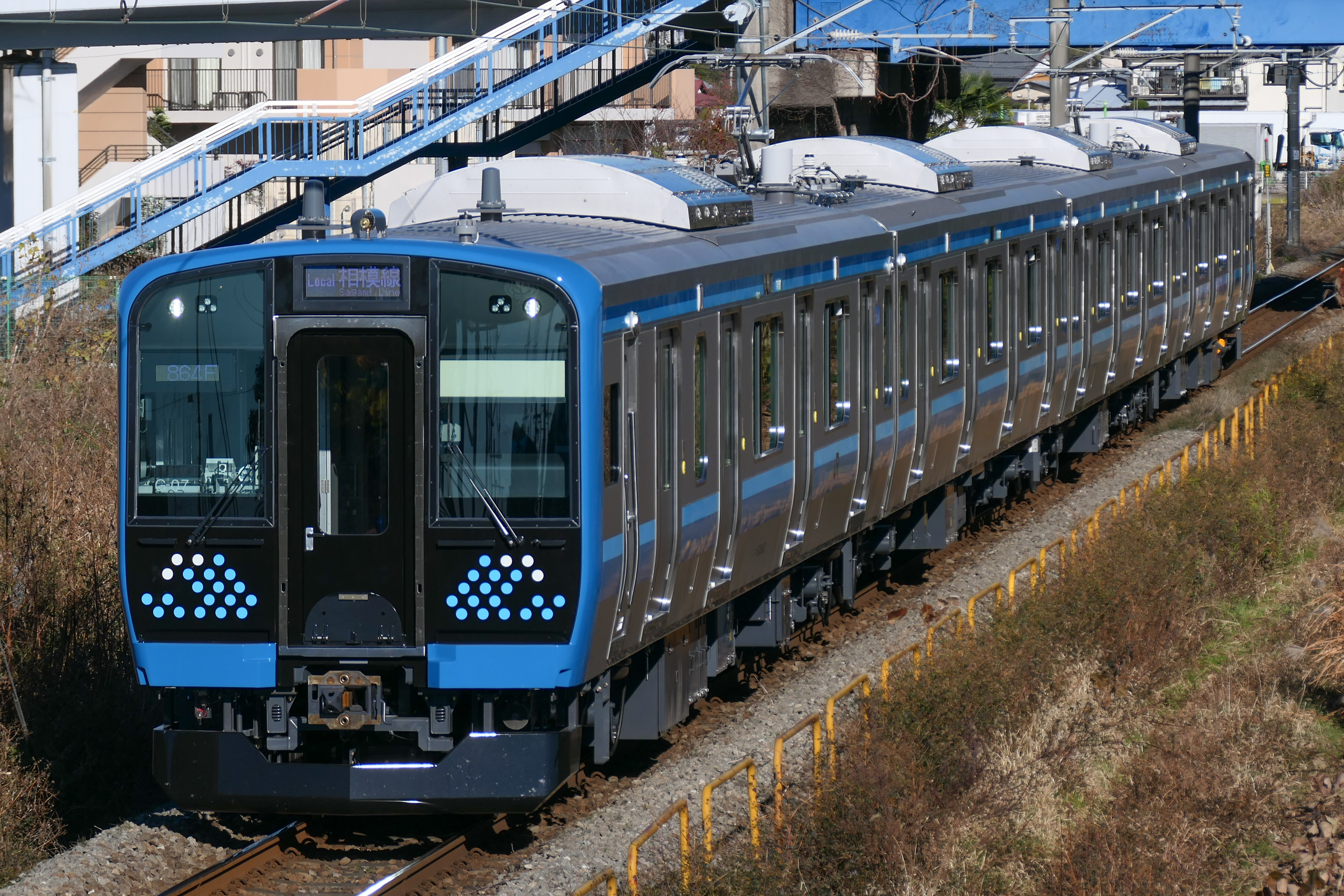
- A E131-500 series EMU in November 2021

Overview
- Owner: JR East
- Locale: Kanagawa Prefecture
- Termini: Chigasaki; Hashimoto
- Stations: 18

Service
- Type: Heavy rail
- Rolling stock: E131-500 series

History
- Opened: 28 September 1921; 105 years ago

Technical
- Line length: 33.3 km (20.7 mi)
- Number of tracks: 1
- Track gauge: 1,067 mm (3 ft 6 in)
- Electrification: Overhead line, 1,500 V DC
Route map

The Sagami Line (Japanese: 相模線, Hepburn: Sagami-sen) is a railway line in Kanagawa Prefecture, Japan, operated by East Japan Railway Company (JR East). It approximately parallels the east bank of the Sagami River. The line connects Hashimoto Station in Sagamihara and Chigasaki Station in Chigasaki. The entire line is single-track, with passing available at almost every other station.

== Services ==
All services on the Line are Local trains, stopping at every station.

As of August 2025, services operate approximately every 15 minutes during morning and evening peak periods, and every 20 minutes at other times (every 30 minutes at night).

Running time is between 49 and 73 minutes towards Hashimoto, and between 46 and 67 minutes towards Chigasaki. The large variance in running times is due to the entire line being single-track, requiring trains to wait at passing stations for a train in the opposite direction to arrive before they can depart.

Between March 1991 and 11 March 2022, some trains operated through services onto the Yokohama Line beyond Hashimoto and made four additional stops, terminating at Hachiōji Station.

== Rolling stock ==
- E131-500 series four-car EMUs (12 trainsets) (from 18 November 2021)

Former Rolling Stock:

- KiHa 4 DMU
- KiHa 10 DMU (until 1980)
- KiHa 20 DMU (1958–1982)
- KiHa 26-400 (under KiHa 55 family)
- KiHa 30
- KiHa 35 (1986–1991)
- KiHa 36
- 205-500 series four-car EMUs (from 1991—2022)

The Sagami Line formerly operated a series of Diesel Multiple Unit passenger trains before electrification. The 205-500 series four-car EMUs were introduced in 1991 after the line was electrified. New E131-500 series EMUs replaced the older 205 series EMUs starting from Fall 2021.

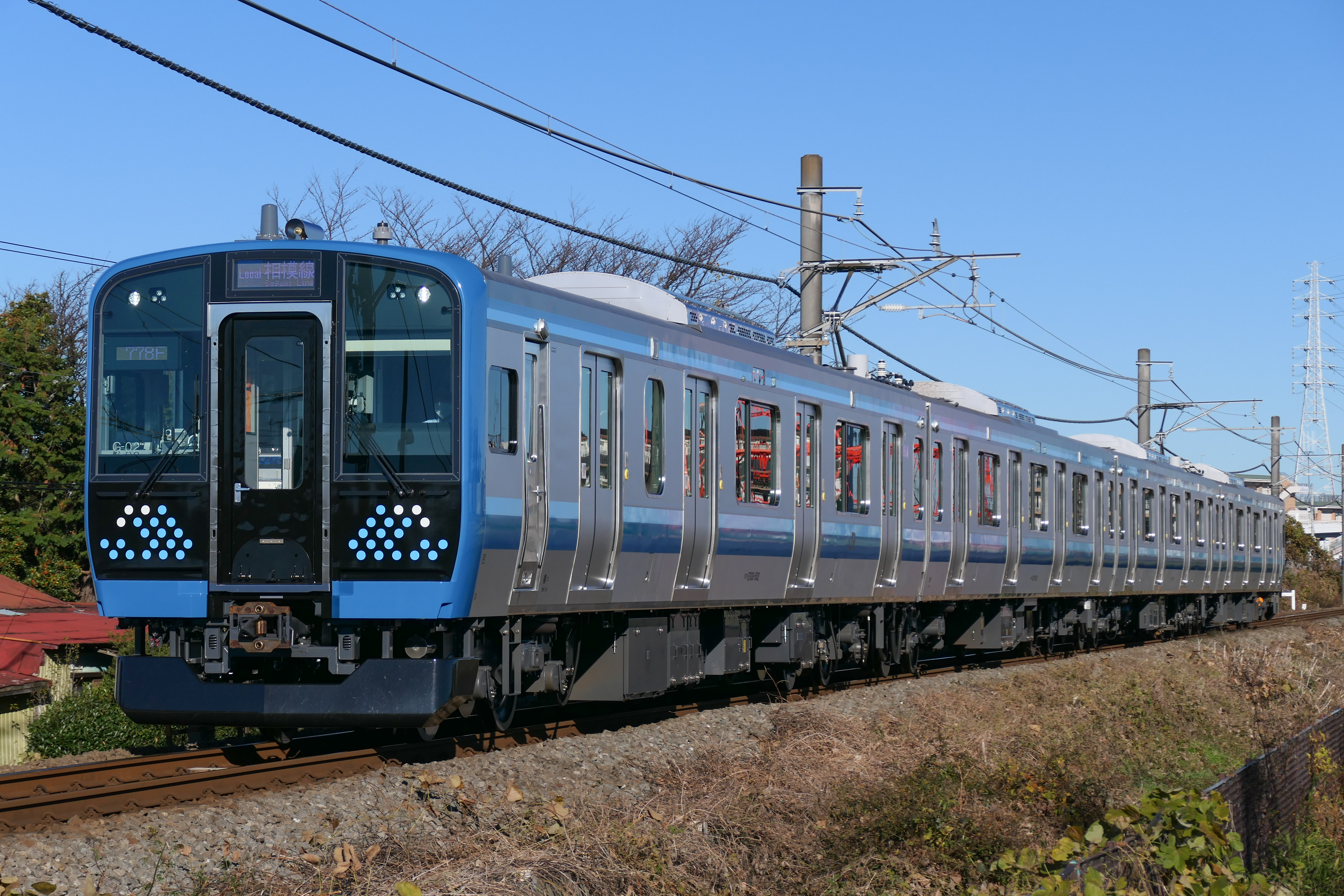
Sagami Line E131-500 series EMU, November 2021

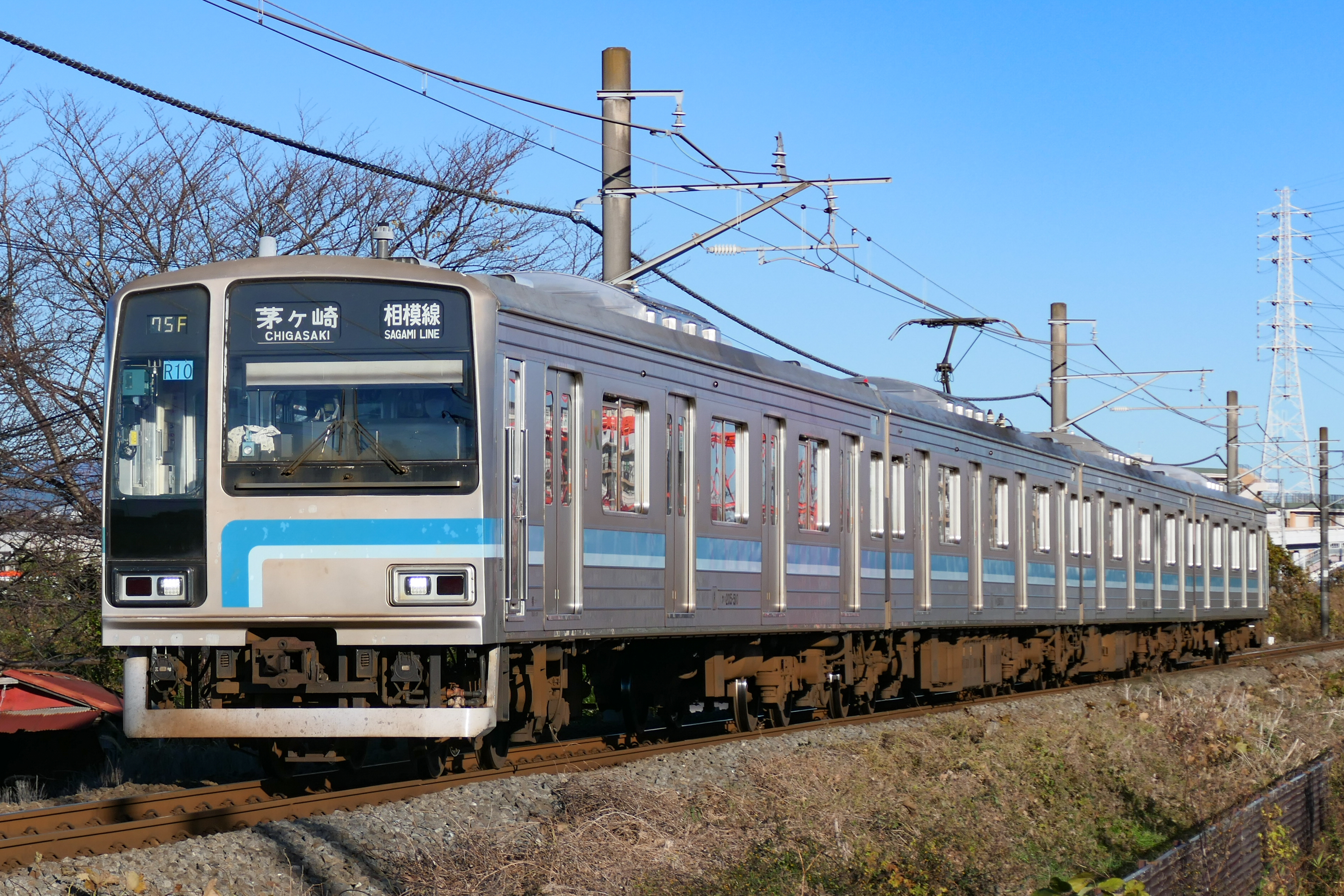
Sagami Line 205-500 series EMU, November 2021

== Stations ==
- All stations located in Kanagawa Prefecture.
- All trains stop at every station.
- Stations marked "◇", "v", or "^" allow passing; stations marked"｜" do not.

Station	Distance in km (mi)		Transfers	Track layout	Location
Station	Between stations	Total	Transfers	Track layout	Location
Chigasaki 茅ヶ崎	—N/a	0 (0)	Tōkaidō Line (JT10); Shōnan–Shinjuku Line	v	Chigasaki
Kita-Chigasaki 北茅ヶ崎	1.3 (0.81)	1.3 (0.81)		◇	Chigasaki
Kagawa 香川	2.1 (1.3)	3.4 (2.1)		｜	Chigasaki
Samukawa 寒川	1.7 (1.1)	5.1 (3.2)		◇	Samukawa, Kōza District
Miyayama 宮山	2.1 (1.3)	7.2 (4.5)		｜	Samukawa, Kōza District
Kurami 倉見	1.4 (0.87)	8.6 (5.3)		◇	Samukawa, Kōza District
Kadosawabashi 門沢橋	1.4 (0.87)	10.0 (6.2)		｜	Ebina
Shake 社家	1.6 (0.99)	11.6 (7.2)		◇	Ebina
Atsugi 厚木	2.6 (1.6)	14.2 (8.8)	Odakyū Odawara Line (OH33)	｜	Ebina
Ebina 海老名	1.7 (1.1)	15.9 (9.9)	Odakyū Odawara Line (OH32); Sōtetsu Main Line (SO18)	◇	Ebina
Iriya 入谷	3.0 (1.9)	18.9 (11.7)		｜	Zama
Sōbudaishita 相武台下	1.7 (1.1)	20.6 (12.8)		◇	Minami-ku, Sagamihara
Shimomizo 下溝	2.9 (1.8)	23.5 (14.6)		｜	Minami-ku, Sagamihara
Harataima 原当麻	1.3 (0.81)	24.8 (15.4)		◇	Minami-ku, Sagamihara
Banda 番田	2.1 (1.3)	26.9 (16.7)		◇	Chūō-ku, Sagamihara
Kamimizo 上溝	1.5 (0.93)	28.4 (17.6)		｜	Chūō-ku, Sagamihara
Minami-Hashimoto 南橋本	2.9 (1.8)	31.3 (19.4)		◇	Chūō-ku, Sagamihara
Hashimoto 橋本	2.0 (1.2)	33.3 (20.7)	Yokohama Line (JH28); Keiō Sagamihara Line (KO45)	^	Midori-ku, Sagamihara

== History ==
The Chigasaki to Samukawa section was opened by the Sagami Railway (Sōtetsu) in 1921, primarily to haul gravel. The line was extended to Atsugi in 1926, and to Hashimoto in 1931.

The line was nationalized in 1944 during World War II; the private Sagami Railway began operating the then Jinchū Line (神中線), now the Sagami Railway Main Line.

A short branch to Nishi-Samukawa Station from Samukawa Station was closed in 1984, and freight services ceased in 1998.

After privatization of Japanese National Railways (JNR) in 1987, the line was electrified in 1991. Before the JNR privatization, there were discussions to transfer the line to the Sagami Railway in order meet the expected demands of passenger traffic in the Tokyo and Yokohama suburbs. Because it had long been left as a non-electrified rural line, the cost to upgrade the line was beyond the ability of then financially constrained JNR; Sagami Railway, on the other hand, was running a profitable operation on its own line. However, the two companies did not agree on a deal, and plans to transfer the line were cancelled.

Upon electrification, through services to the Yokohama Line began, using the new 205-500 series EMUs. The through service operation ended on 11 March 2022.

The line was converted to one-man operation on 12 March 2022 following the completion of delivery of the E131-500 series trains.
