= Chigasaki Station =

Railway station in Chigasaki, Kanagawa Prefecture, Japan

JT10 Chigasaki Station 茅ヶ崎駅
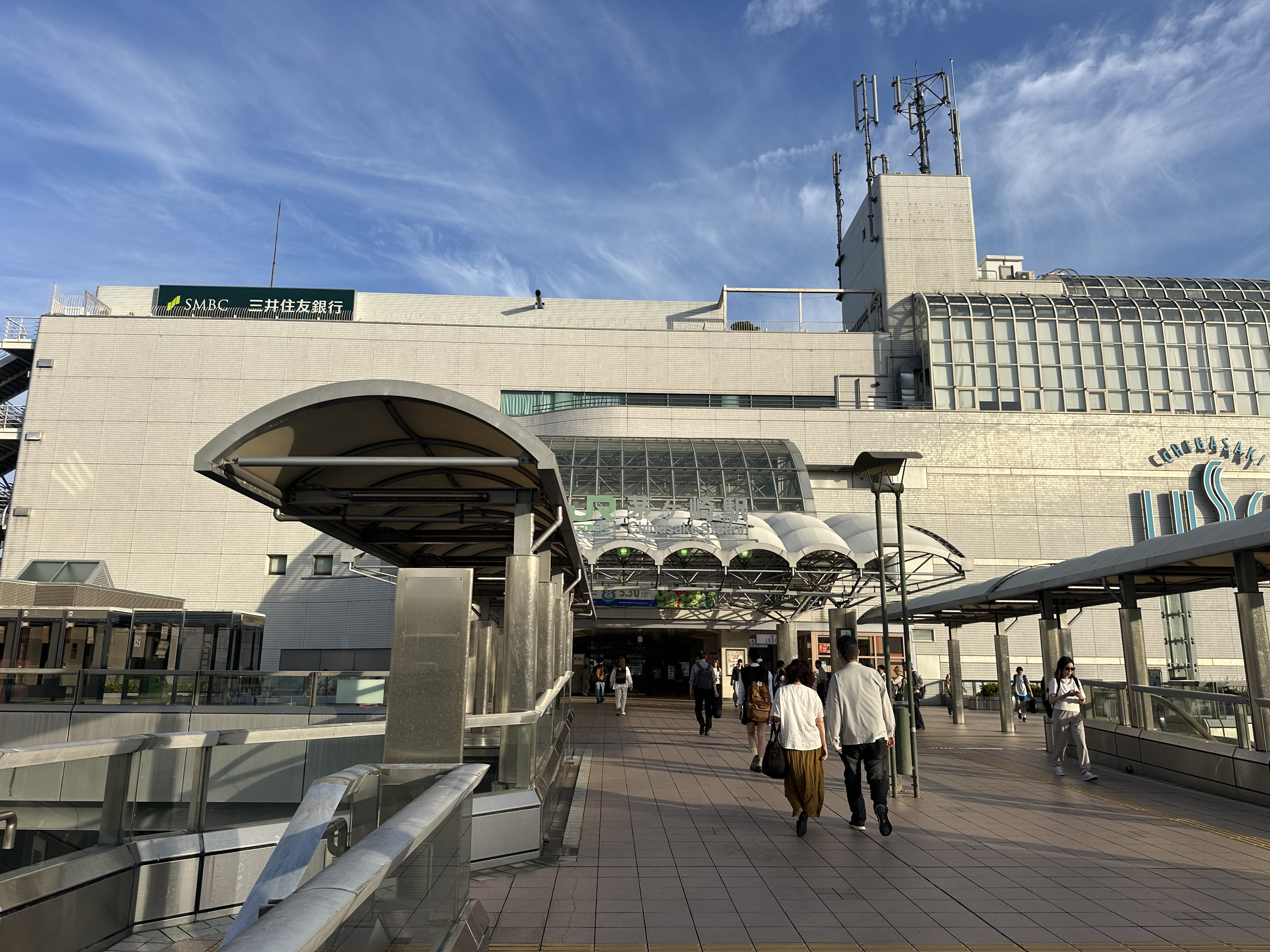
- North side of the station

General information
- Location: Motomachi 1-1, Chigasaki-shi, Kanagawa-ken 253-0043; Japan
- Coordinates: 35°19′49″N 139°24′24″E
- Operator: JR East
- Lines: ■ Tōkaidō Main Line; ■ Sagami Line
- Platforms: 3 island platforms
- Tracks: 6
- Connections: Bus terminal

Construction
- Structure type: At grade

Other information
- Status: Staffed (Midori no Madoguchi)
- Station code: JT10
- Website: Official website

History
- Opened: 15 June 1898; 128 years ago

Passengers
- FY2019: 55,778 daily (boarding passengers)

Services
Preceding station	JR East	Following station
Hiratsuka JT11 towards Odawara	Shōnan	Tsujidō JT09 towards Tokyo
Hiratsuka JT11 towards Odawara	Shōnan	Fujisawa JT08 towards Shinjuku
Hiratsuka JT11 towards Atami	Tōkaidō Line	Tsujidō JT09 towards Tokyo
Hiratsuka JT11 towards Odawara	Shōnan–Shinjuku Line Special Rapid	Fujisawa JT08 towards Takasaki
Hiratsuka JT11 towards Odawara	Shōnan–Shinjuku Line Rapid	Tsujidō JT09 towards Maebashi
Terminus	Sagami Line	Kita-Chigasaki towards Hachiōji
Location
- Location within Kanagawa Prefecture Location within Kanto Area Location within Japan

Chigasaki Station (Japanese: 茅ヶ崎駅, Hepburn: Chigasaki-eki) is a junction passenger railway station located in the city of Chigasaki, Kanagawa Prefecture, Japan. It is operated by the East Japan Railway Company (JR East).

== Lines ==
Chigasaki Station is served by the Tōkaidō Main Line and the Shōnan-Shinjuku Line, and is located 56.8 kilometers from Tokyo. It is also the southern terminus of the 33.3 kilometer Sagami Line.

== Station layout ==
Chigasaki Station has three island platforms with an elevated station building. The station has a Midori no Madoguchi staffed ticket office.

=== Platforms ===
1,2
■ Sagami Line
for Ebina, Kamimizo, Hashimoto, Hachiōji (via Yokohama Line)
3
■ Tōkaidō Line

(Ltd. Exp. Shōnan)

for Shinagawa and Tokyo
for Shinjuku
4
■ Tōkaidō Line

(Ltd. Exp. Shōnan)

for Hiratsuka and Odawara
5
Tokaido Line
(Ueno-Tokyo Line)
for Yokohama, Tokyo, Ueno, Ōmiya
Utsunomiya Line for Utsunomiya and Kuroiso
Takasaki Line for Takasaki and Maebashi
Shōnan-Shinjuku Line
for Yokohama, Shibuya, Shinjuku, Ikebukuro, Ōmiya, Takasaki and Maebashi (via Takasaki Line)
6
Tōkaidō Line
for Kōzu, Odawara, Atami, Numazu
Itō Line for Itō

== History ==
Chigasaki Station was opened on June 15, 1898, for both passenger and freight service as part of the section of the Japan National Railway (JNR) Tōkaidō Main Line connecting Yokohama with Kōzu. The adjacent Sagami Line station (then operated by the Sagami Railway opened on September 28, 1921. It was nationalized on June 1, 1944, becoming part of the Japan National Railways. Scheduled freight services were discontinued from 1984, and small parcel services from 1985. With the dissolution and privatization of the JNR on April 1, 1987, the station came under the operational control of the East Japan Railway Company. The north exit bus terminal was greatly expanded in 1996 and 1998. Automated turnstiles using the Suica IC Card system came into operation on November 18, 2001. The station building was reconstructed in 2006 to include a multi-story department store.

On 1 October 2014, the departure melody for platforms 5 and 6 was changed to "Kibō no Wadachi" by the Southern All Stars, as the band's leader is from Chigasaki.

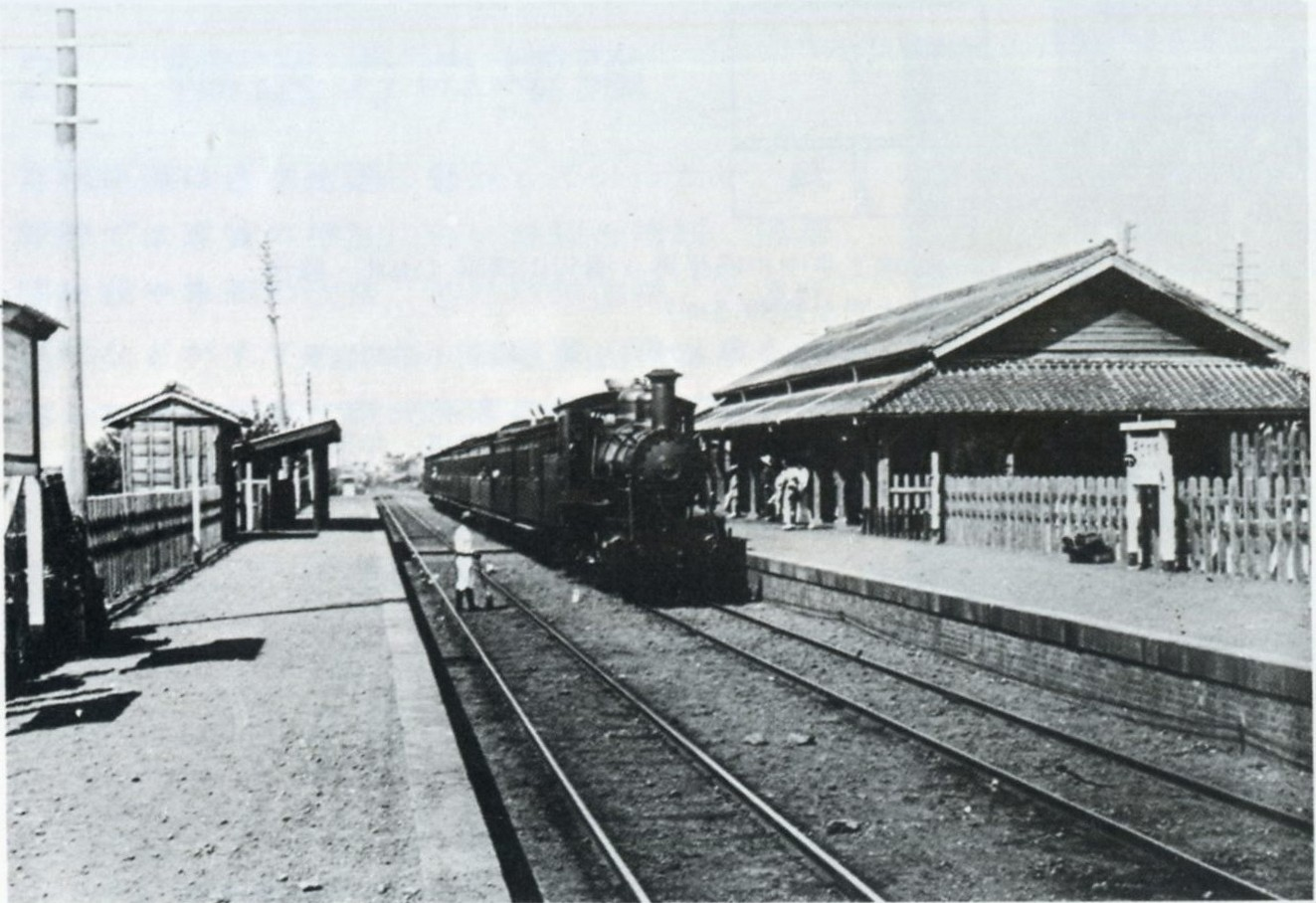
The station in 1898

== Passenger statistics ==
In fiscal 2019, the station was used by an average of 55,778 passengers daily (boarding passengers only).

The passenger figures (boarding passengers only) for previous years are as shown below.

Fiscal year	daily average
2005	54,041
2010	54,599
2015	55,600

== Surrounding area ==
- Chigasaki City Hall
- Chigasaki Municipal Hospital
- Chigasaki Citizens' Cultural Centerl
- Kanagawa Prefectural Chigasaki High School
- Kanagawa Prefectural Tsurumine High School
- Chigasaki Tokushukai Hospital
- Chigasaki City Library
- Chigasaki City Museum of Art

== See also ==
- List of railway stations in Japan
