= Sakaori Station =

Railway station in Kōfu, Yamanashi Prefecture, Japan

CO42 Sakaori Station 酒折駅
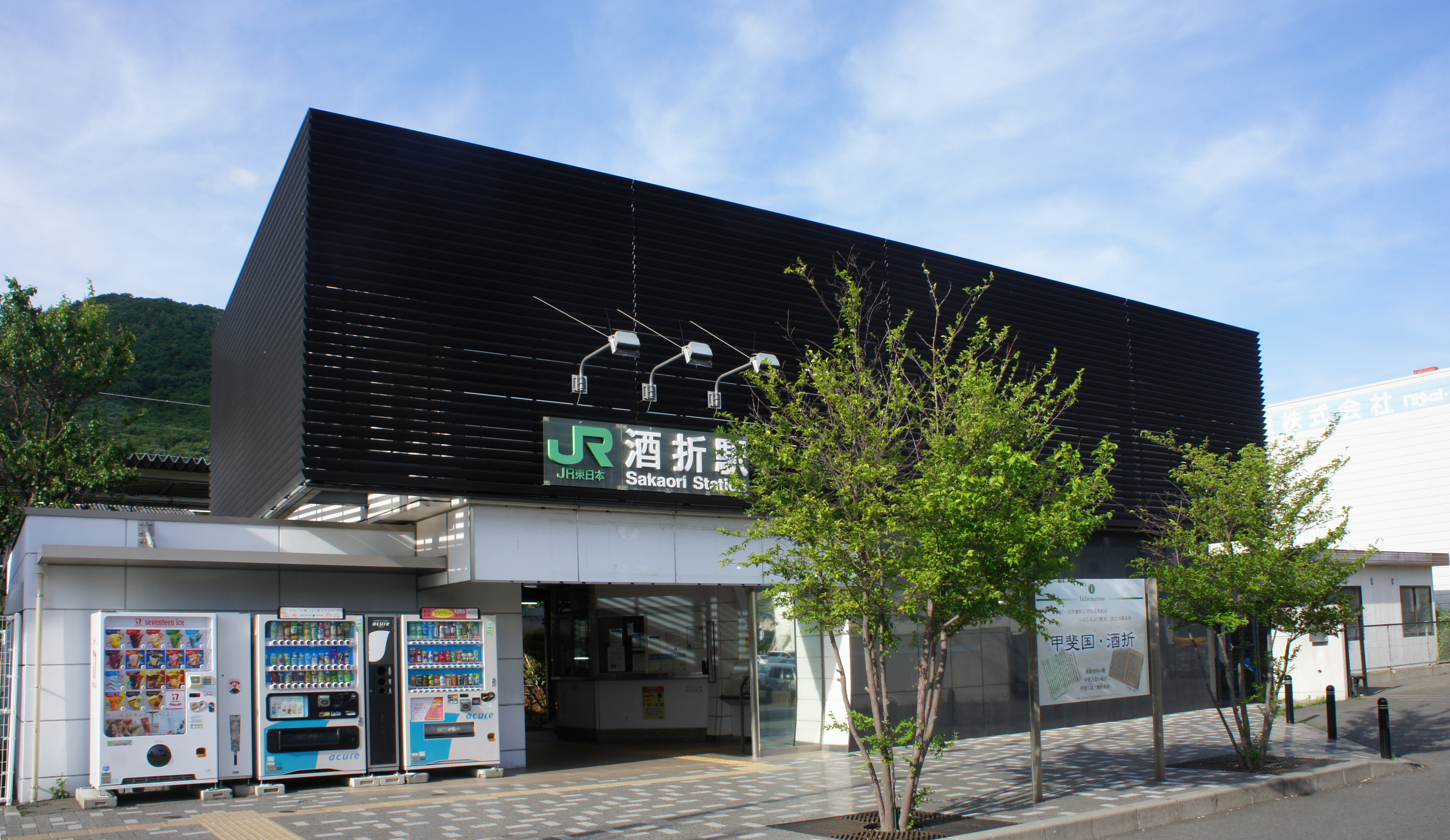
- Sakaori Station, May 2021

General information
- Location: Sakaori, Kōfu-shi, Yamanashi-ken; Japan
- Coordinates: 35°39′34″N 138°35′57″E operator = JR East
- Line: ■ Chūō Main Line
- Distance: 131.2 km from Tokyo
- Platforms: 1 side + 1 island platform
- Tracks: 3

Other information
- Status: Staffed
- Website: Official website

History
- Opened: 25 November 1905

Passengers
- FY2023: 4,136 (daily)

Services
Preceding station	JR East	Following station
Kōfu CO43 towards Shiojiri	Chūō Main Line Local	Isawa-onsen CO41 towards Tachikawa
Location
- Location within Yamanashi Prefecture Location within Japan

Sakaori Station (酒折駅, Sakaori-eki) is a railway station of the Chūō Main Line, East Japan Railway Company (JR East) in Sakaori 1-chōme, in the city of Kōfu, Yamanashi Prefecture, Japan.

== Lines ==
Sakaori Station is served by the Chūō Main Line, and is 131.2 kilometers from the terminus of the line at Tokyo Station.

== Station layout ==
The station consists of one ground level side platform and a one island platform serving three tracks, connected by an underground passage. The station is staffed.

=== Platforms ===
1	■ Chūō Main Line	for Kōfu, Nirasaki, and Kobuchizawa
2	■ Chūō Main Line	for express and starting trains
3	■ Chūō Main Line	for Ōtsuki, Takao, Hachiōji and Tachikawa

== History ==
Sakaori Station was opened on February 11, 1926 as a station on the Japanese Government Railways (JGR) Chūō Main Line. The JGR became the JNR (Japanese National Railways) after the end of World War II. Scheduled freight services were discontinued from November 1986. With the dissolution and privatization of the JNR on April 1, 1987, the station came under the control of the East Japan Railway Company. Automated turnstiles using the Suica IC Card system came into operation from October 16, 2004. The current station building was completed in February 2006.

== Passenger statistics ==
In fiscal 2017, the station was used by an average of 2,203 passengers daily (boarding passengers only).

== Surrounding area ==
- Furouen - Garden Park of Eternal Life
- iCLA (International College of Liberal Arts)
- Kofu Higashi High School
- Yamanashi Eiwa College
- Yamanashi Gakuin University
- Yamanashi Gakuin Junior College
- Yamanashi Gakuin High School
- Kai Zenkoji Temple

== See also ==
- List of railway stations in Japan
