= Hakusan Castle =

Japanese castle

- 白山城
- Nirasaki, Yamanashi, Japan

Site information
- Type: yamashiro-style Japanese castle
- Controlled by: Takeda clan
- Condition: Ruins

Location
- Coordinates: 35°42′03″N 138°25′19″E

Site history
- Built: late Heian period
- In use: early Edo period

Hakusan Castle (白山城, Hakusan-jō) was a Heian period yamashiro-style Japanese castle located in the Kamiyamamachi neighborhood of the city of Nirasaki, Yamanashi prefecture. It was the primary fortress of the warlord Takeda Nobuyoshi, the ancestor of the Takeda clan. The ruins have been protected as a National Historic Site since 2001. The castle is also known as Nabeyama Castle (鍋山城, Nabeyama-jō)

== Background ==
Hakusan Castle is located in the northwestern part of the prefecture and is located at the northern end of the Kōfu basin, on a mountain with elevation of 573 meters. The site is on the right bank of the Kamanashi River near its confluence with the Shiokawa River, which can be considered part of its natural defenses. The ruins of Shinpu Castle can be seen almost due north across the river. The castle extended on a ridge extending from north to south, about 150 meters east-to-west by 180 meters north-to-south. The enclosures are protected by vertical dry moats, and two large moats are provided on the ridge behind the west side. This combination of horizontal and radial moats was one of the techniques of Takeda castle design. Behind the west side leads to a ridge with an elevation of 882 meters, and the north and south ridges descend on the east side so as to wrap around the site of Hakusan Castle, with a signal tower built at the tip of each ridge. Each beacon defended the north and south of the main castle.

The castle was built by Takeda Nobuyoshi, the son of Minamoto no Kiyomitsu of Yato Castle and the progenitor of the Takeda clan. Nobumitsu's residence was located just over a kilometer away and takes its name from the Hakusan Jinja, a Shinto shrine preexisting on this mountain. Little is known of the history of Hakusan Castle, other than that it was completely rebuilt by Aoki Nobutane as part the outer defensive line of Kai Province. After the fall of the Takeda clan, the castle came under the control of Tokugawa Ieyasu, who used it as a stronghold against the Odawara Hōjō in his struggle for control of the province. The castle was assigned to the control of Yamadera Nobumasa for a period, and disappeared from history in the Kanbun era of the Edo Period (1661-1673).

The ruins of the castle include the remains of several kuruwa enclosures which formed the first, second and third baileys, as well as the remains of earthworks, dry moats, vertical moats, and foundations of gates. The preservation of the remains is very good, and plans to turn the site into quarry in 1983, and again in 1996 were thwarted by local conservation groups. The ruins are a short walk from the "Nabeyamagami" bus stop on the a bus from Nirasaki Station on the JR East Chūō Main Line.

== See also ==
- List of Historic Sites of Japan (Yamanashi)
