= Shimpu Station =

Railway station in Nirasaki, Yamanashi Prefecture, Japan

CO47 Shimpu Station 新府駅
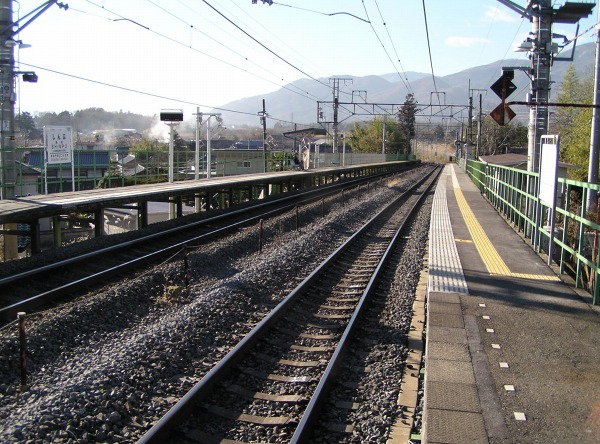
- Shimpu Station platforms in December 2005

General information
- Location: 4103-1, Nakada-machi Nakajo, Nirasaki-shi, Yamanashi-ken; Japan
- Coordinates: 35°44′14″N 138°26′00″E
- Operator: JR East
- Line: ■ Chūō Main Line
- Distance: 151.2 km from Tokyo
- Platforms: 2 side platforms
- Tracks: 2

Other information
- Status: Unstaffed
- Website: Official website

History
- Opened: September 10, 1972

Passengers
- FY2010: 68 daily

Services
Preceding station	JR East	Following station
Anayama CO48 towards Shiojiri	Chūō Main Line Local	Nirasaki CO46 towards Tachikawa
Location
- Location within Yamanashi Prefecture Location within Japan

Shimpu Station (新府駅, Shinpu-eki) is a railway station of the Chūō Main Line, East Japan Railway Company (JR East) in Nakata-Nakajō, Nirasaki City, Yamanashi Prefecture, Japan.

== Lines ==
Shinpu Station is served by the Chūō Main Line, and is 151.2 kilometers from the terminus of the line at Tokyo Station.

== Station layout ==
The station consists of two opposed side platforms built on an embankment. There is no station building and the station is unattended.

=== Platforms ===
west	■ Chūō Main Line	for Shiojiri and Matsumoto
east	■ Chūō Main Line	for Kōfu, Enzan, Ōtsuki and Tachikawa

== History ==
Shimpu Station opened on June 10, 1945 as a signal stop, and was elevated to a full station on September 10, 1972 as a station on the JNR (Japanese National Railways). With the dissolution and privatization of the JNR on April 1, 1987, the station came under the control of the East Japan Railway Company.

== Passenger statistics ==
In fiscal 2010, the station was used by an average of 68 passengers daily (boarding passengers only).

== Surrounding area ==
- Kamanashi River
- Japan National Route 20
- site of Shinpu Castle

== See also ==
- List of railway stations in Japan
