= Anayama Station =

Railway station in Nirasaki, Yamanashi Prefecture, Japan

CO48 Anayama Station 穴山駅
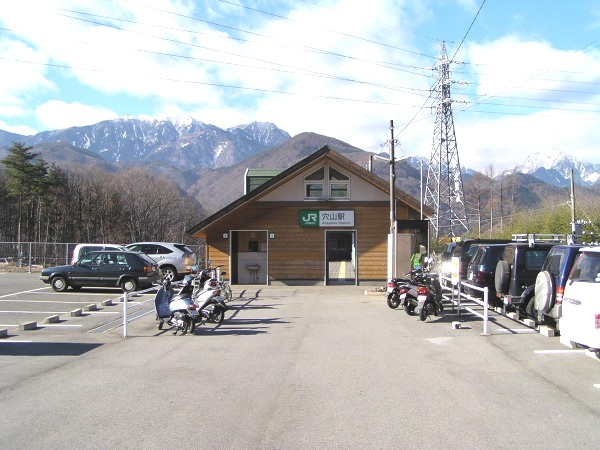
- Anayama Station in December 2006

General information
- Location: 4248-2, Anayama-cho, Nirasaki-shi, Yamanashi-ken; Japan
- Coordinates: 35°45′04″N 138°24′50″E
- Operator: JR East
- Line: ■ Chūō Main Line
- Distance: 154.7 km from Tokyo
- Platforms: 1 island platform
- Tracks: 2

Other information
- Status: Unstaffed
- Website: Official website

History
- Opened: August 1, 1913

Passengers
- FY2010: 186 daily

Services
Preceding station	JR East	Following station
Hinoharu CO49 towards Shiojiri	Chūō Main Line Local	Shimpu CO47 towards Tachikawa
Location
- Location within Yamanashi Prefecture Location within Japan

Anayama Station (穴山駅, Anayama-eki) is a railway station of the Chūō Main Line, East Japan Railway Company (JR East) in Anayama, in the city of Nirasaki, Yamanashi Prefecture, Japan.

== Lines ==
Anayama Station is served by the Chūō Main Line, and is 154.7 kilometers from the terminus of the line at Tokyo Station.

== Station layout ==
The station consists of one ground level island platform, connected to the station building by a footbridge. The station is unattended.

=== Platforms ===
west	■ Chūō Main Line	for Shiojiri and Matsumoto
east	■ Chūō Main Line	for Kōfu, Enzan, Ōtsuki and Tachikawa

== History ==
Anayama Station opened on August 1, 1913, as a station on the Japanese Government Railways (JGR) Chūō Main Line. The JGR became the JNR (Japanese National Railways) after the end of World War II. With the dissolution and privatization of the JNR on April 1, 1987, the station came under the control of the East Japan Railway Company. Automated turnstiles using the Suica IC Card system came into operation from October 16, 2004.

== Passenger statistics ==
In fiscal 2010, the station was used by an average of 186 passengers daily (boarding passengers only).

== Surrounding area ==
- Kamanashi River
- Japan National Route 20
- Anayama Post Office

== See also ==
- List of railway stations in Japan
