= Shiozaki Station =

Railway station in Kai, Yamanashi Prefecture, Japan

CO45 Shiozaki Station 塩崎駅
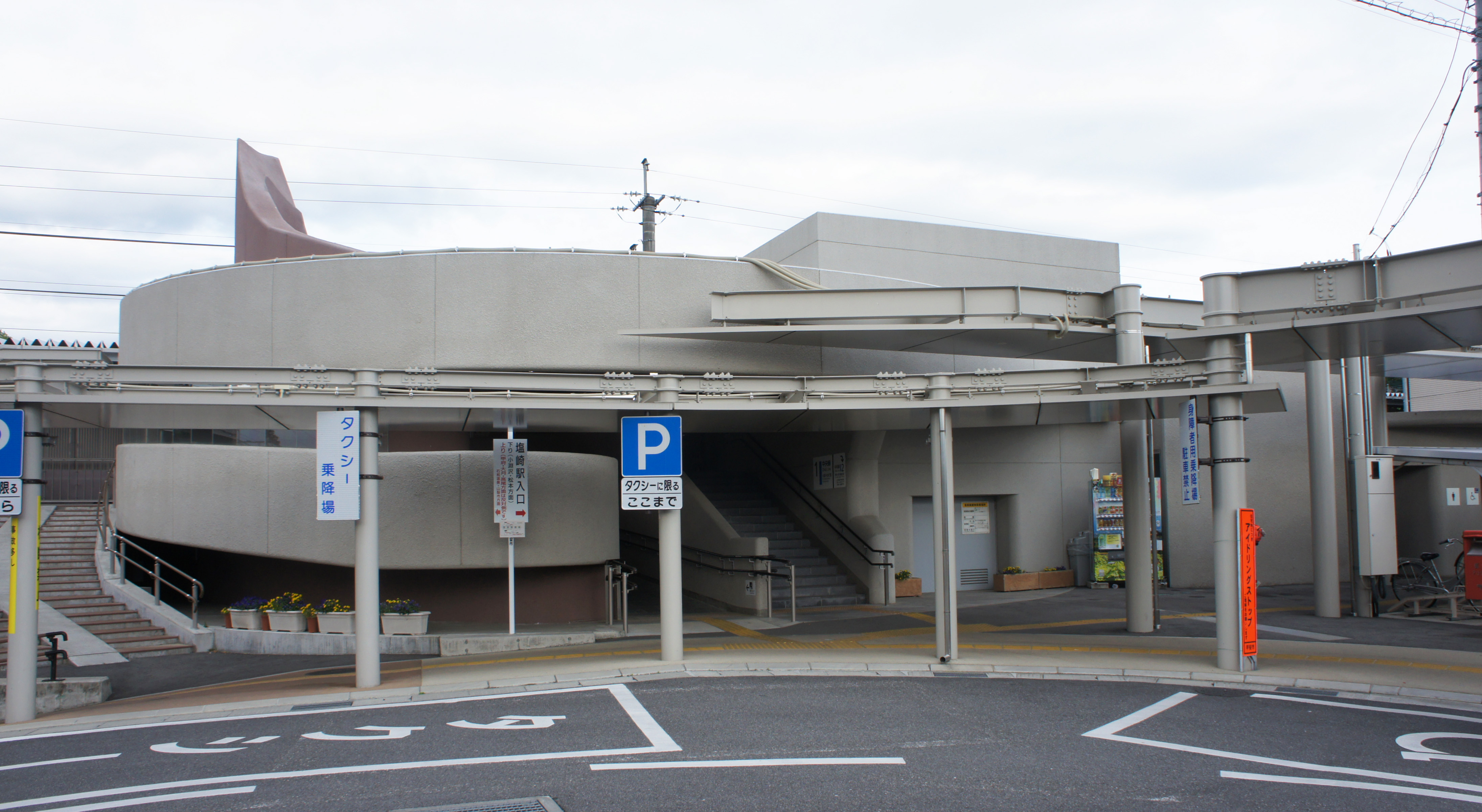
- Shiozaki Station in May 2021

General information
- Location: 123, Shimoimai, Kai-shi, Yamanashi-ken; Japan
- Coordinates: 35°41′16″N 138°29′15″E
- Operator: JR East
- Line: ■ Chūō Main Line
- Distance: 142.7 km from Tokyo
- Platforms: 2 side platforms
- Tracks: 2

Other information
- Status: Staffed
- Website: Official website

Passengers
- FY2023: 2,032 (daily)

Services
Preceding station	JR East	Following station
Nirasaki CO46 towards Shiojiri	Chūō Main Line Local	Ryūō CO44 towards Tachikawa
Location
- Location within Yamanashi Prefecture Location within Japan

Shiozaki Station (塩崎駅, Shiozaki-eki) is a railway station of Chūō Main Line, East Japan Railway Company (JR East) in Shimoimai, in the city of Kai, Yamanashi Prefecture, Japan.

== Lines ==
Shiozaki Station is served by the Chūō Main Line, and is 142.7 km (88.7 mi) from the terminus of the line at Tokyo Station

== Layout ==
Shiozaki Station has two elevated opposed side platforms, which were on an embankment at a higher level than the station building, and which were not connected by an overpass or level crossing. Changing platforms required leaving the station and crossing a public road and reentering. In 2014, the city of Kai and JR East built a new station building which eliminated the height difference, making it a barrier-free station. The station is staffed.

=== Platforms ===
1, 2	■ Chūō Main Line	for Nirasaki, Kobuchizawa and Matsumoto
3	■ Chūō Main Line	for Kōfu, Enzan, Ōtsuki and Tachikawa

== History ==
Shiozaki Station opened on December 15, 1951 as a passenger station on the JNR (Japanese National Railways). With the dissolution and privatization of the JNR on April 1, 1987, the station came under the control of the East Japan Railway Company. Automated turnstiles using the Suica IC Card system came into operation from October 16, 2004. A new station building was completed in 2014.。

== Passenger statistics ==
In fiscal 2017, the station was used by an average of 1,120 passengers daily (boarding passengers only).

== Surrounding area ==
- Nihon Koku High School

== See also ==
- List of railway stations in Japan
