= Higashi-Yamanashi Station =

Railway station in Yamanashi, Japan

CO38 Higashi-Yamanashi Station 東山梨駅
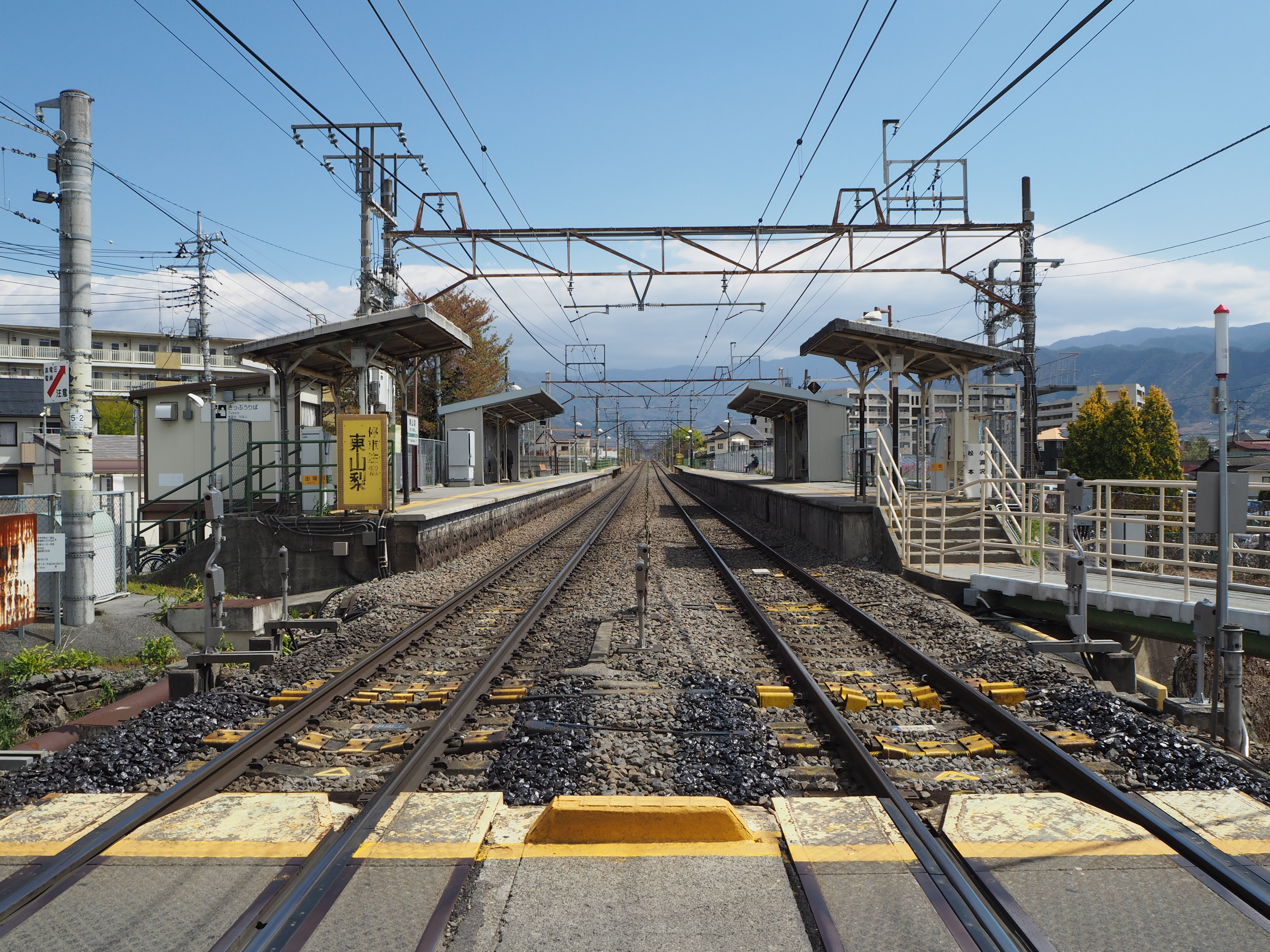
- Higashi-Yamanashi Station platforms, April 2018

General information
- Location: 192, Sangasho, Yamanashi-shi, Yamanashi-ken; Japan
- Coordinates: 35°41′39″N 138°42′10″E
- Operator: JR East
- Line: ■ Chūō Main Line
- Distance: 120.1 km from Tokyo
- Platforms: 2 side platforms
- Tracks: 2

Other information
- Status: Unstaffed
- Website: Official website

History
- Opened: February 5, 1957

Passengers
- FY2010: 669 daily

Services
Preceding station	JR East	Following station
Yamanashishi CO39 towards Shiojiri	Chūō Main Line Local	Enzan CO37 towards Tachikawa
Location
- Location within Yamanashi Prefecture Location within Japan

Higashi-Yamanashi Station (東山梨駅, Higashi-Yamanashi-eki) is a railway station of the Chūō Main Line, East Japan Railway Company (JR East) in Sangasho, in the city of Yamanashi, Yamanashi Prefecture, Japan.

== Lines ==
Higashi-Yamanashi Station is served by the Chūō Main Line, and is 120.1 kilometers from the terminus of the line at Tokyo Station.

== Station layout ==
The station consists of two unnumbered opposed side platforms connected by a level crossing. The station is unattended.

=== Platforms ===
south	■ Chūō Main Line	for Kōfu, Kobuchizawa, Kami-Suwa and Matsumoto
north	■ Chūō Main Line	for Ōtsuki, Hachiōji, Shinjuku and Tōkyō

== History ==
Higashi-Yamanashi Station opened on February 5, 1957 as a passenger station on the JNR (Japanese National Railways). It has been unattended since October 1970. With the dissolution and privatization of the JNR on April 1, 1987, the station came under the control of the East Japan Railway Company. Automated turnstiles using the Suica IC Card system came into operation from October 16, 2004.

== Passenger statistics ==
In fiscal 2010, the station was used by an average of 669 passengers daily (boarding passengers only).

== Surrounding area ==
- Seihaku-ji

== See also ==
- List of railway stations in Japan
