= Yamanashishi Station =

Railway station in Yamanashi, Japan

CO39 Yamanashishi Station 山梨市駅
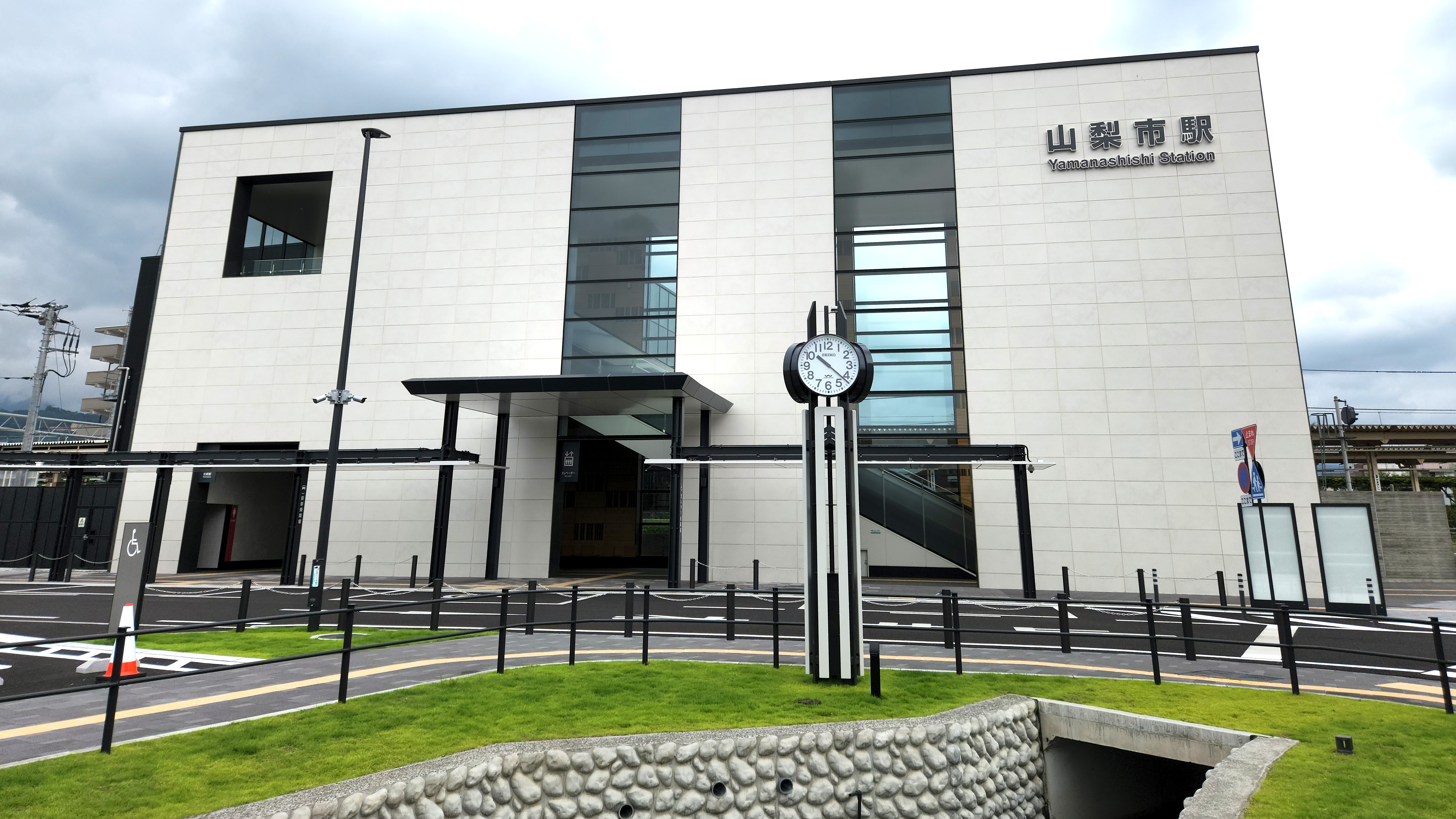
- The south-side building of the station in August 2022

General information
- Location: 1561, Kamikanogawa, Yamanashi-shi, Yamanashi-ken; Japan
- Coordinates: 35°41′06″N 138°40′59″E
- Operator: JR East
- Line: ■ Chūō Main Line
- Distance: 122.2 km from Tokyo
- Platforms: 1 side + 1 island platform
- Tracks: 3

Other information
- Status: Staffed
- Website: Official website

History
- Opened: 11 June 1903
- Former names: Kusakabe (until 1962)

Passengers
- FY2024: 3,278 (daily) ▲5.4%

Services
Preceding station	JR East	Following station
Isawa-Onsen CO41 towards Hakuba	Azusa	Enzan CO37 towards Chiba or Tokyo
Isawa-Onsen CO41 towards Ryūō	Kaiji	Enzan CO37 towards Tokyo
Kasugaichō CO40 towards Shiojiri	Chūō Main Line Local	Higashi-Yamanashi CO38 towards Tachikawa
Location
- Location within Yamanashi Prefecture Location within Japan

Yamanashishi Station (山梨市駅, Yamanashishi-eki) is a railway station of the Chūō Main Line, East Japan Railway Company (JR East) in Kamikanogawa, in the city of Yamanashi, Yamanashi Prefecture, Japan.

== Lines ==
Yamanashishi Station is served by the Chūō Main Line, and is 122.2 kilometers from the terminus of the line at Tokyo Station.

== Station layout ==
The station consists of one side platform and one island platform serving three tracks. The platforms are connected by a footbridge. The station is staffed.

=== Platforms ===
1	■ Chūō Main Line	for Ōtsuki, Hachiōji, Shinjuku and Tōkyō
2	■ Chūō Main Line	(siding)
3	■ Chūō Main Line	for Kōfu, Kobuchizawa, Kami-Suwa and Matsumoto

== History ==
Yamanashishi Station opened on 11 June 1903 as Kusakabe Station (日下部駅) on the Japanese Government Railways (JGR) Chūō Main Line. The JGR became the JNR (Japanese National Railways) after the end of World War II. The station was renamed to its present name on January 15, 1962. Scheduled freight services were discontinued from November 15, 1982. With the dissolution and privatization of the JNR on April 1, 1987, the station came under the control of the East Japan Railway Company. Automated turnstiles using the Suica IC Card system came into operation from October 16, 2004.

== Passenger statistics ==
In fiscal 2017, the station was used by an average of 1788 passengers daily (boarding passengers only).

== Buses ==
Name	Via	Destination	Company	Note
Nishizawa Keikoku Line	Erin-ji	Nishizawa Keikoku (Lake Hirose・Kobushigatake)	Yamanashi Municipal Bus
Nishizawa Keikoku Line	Non stop	Yamanashi Kōsei Hospital	Yamanashi Municipal Bus
The Direction of South Circle Line	Non stop	Yamanashi Kōsei Hospital	Yamanashi Municipal Bus
The Direction of South Circle Line	Kamikurihara・Hikawa Kōkō・Minamichū	Yamanashi-shi Station	Yamanashi Municipal Bus
The Direction of South Circle Line	Kamikurihara・Hikawa Kōkō・Minamichū・Ōno	Yamanashi-shi Station	Yamanashi Municipal Bus
The Direction of South Circle Line	Kyū Yamanashi City Hall・Yamanashi Kōsei Hospital・Odaya	Yamanashi-shi Station	Yamanashi Municipal Bus
The Direction of South Circle Line	Shōtokuji・Odaya・Yamanashi Kōsei Hospital	Yamanashi-shi Station	Yamanashi Municipal Bus
The Direction of South Circle Line	Yamanashi City Hall・Rōjin Kenkō Fukushi Center・Higashi Yashiki・Higashi-Yamanashi Station	Rōjin Kenkō Fukushi Center	Yamanashi Municipal Bus
The Direction of South Circle Line	Non stop	Yamanashi City Hall	Yamanashi Municipal Bus
The Direction of North Circle Line	Yamanashi City Hall・Yawata Jinja・Mizuguchi	Toichi	Yamanashi Municipal Bus
The Direction of North Circle Line	Yamanashi City Hall・Higashi-Yamanashi Station・Shitikaichiba・Fujiniki Danchi	Yamanashi-shi Station	Yamanashi Municipal Bus
The Direction of North Circle Line	Yamanashi City Hall・Yamanashi City Hall・Rōjin Kenkō Fukushi Center・Yawata Jinja・Mizuguchi・Esohara	Yamanashi-shi Station	Yamanashi Municipal Bus
The Direction of North Circle Line	Yamanashi City Hall	Rōjin Kenkō Fukushi Center	Yamanashi Municipal Bus
Fuefukigawa Fruit Park Line	Fruit Park	Fruit Center	Yamanashi Municipal Bus

== Surrounding area ==
- Yamanashi High School
- Fuefuki River

== See also ==
- List of railway stations in Japan
