= Nirasaki =

Nirasaki 韮崎市
- City
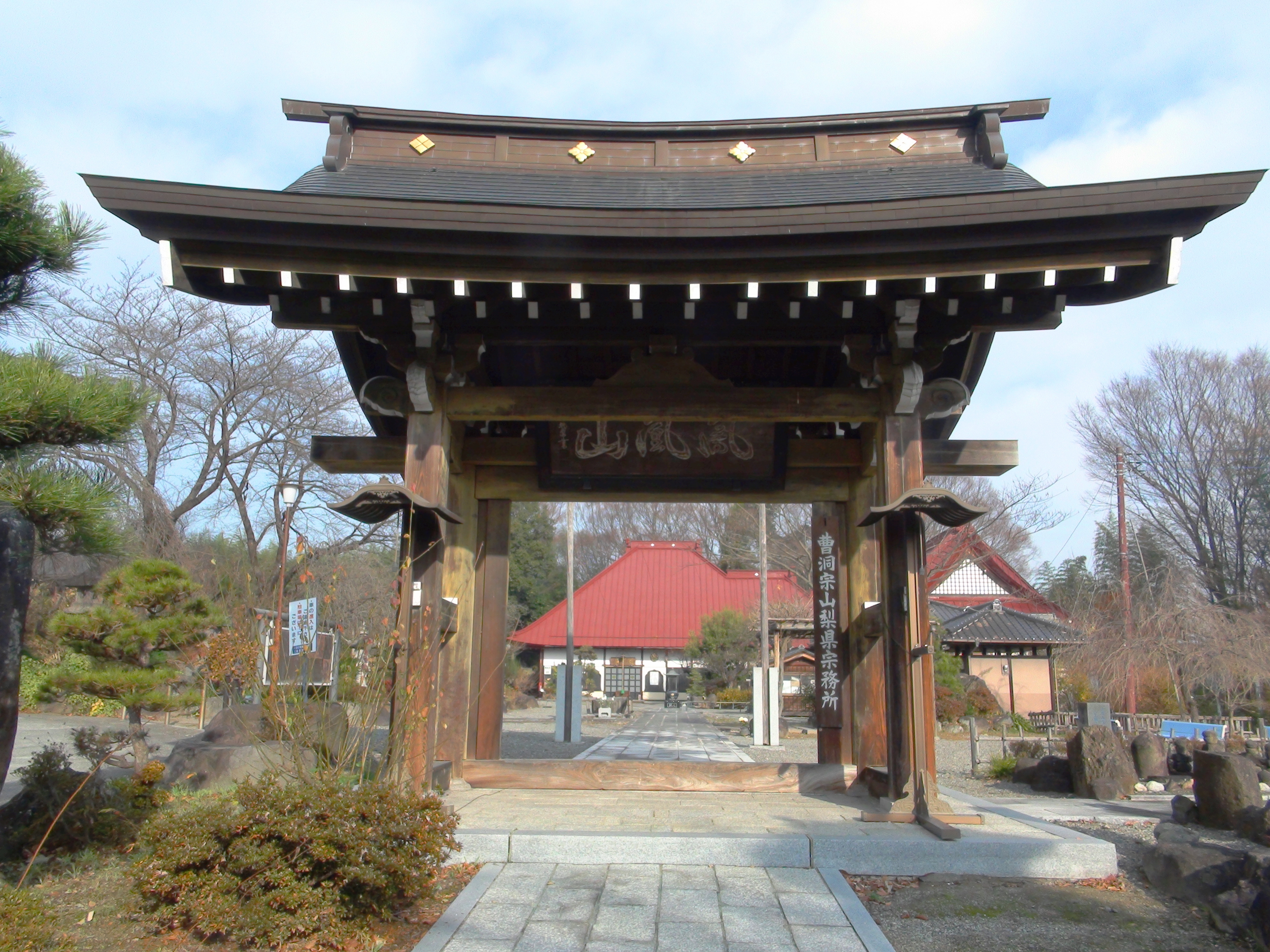
- Ganjo-ji temple in Nirasaki

- Flag Seal

- Location of Nirasaki in Yamanashi Prefecture

- Coordinates: 35°42′31.9″N 138°26′46.1″E
- Country: Japan
- Region: Chūbu (Tōkai)
- Prefecture: Yamanashi

Government
  - Mayor: Komei Yokouchi (since November 2006)

Area
  - Total: 143.69 km^{2} (55.48 sq mi)

Population (October 1, 2020)
  - Total: 28,150
  - Density: 195.9/km^{2} (507.4/sq mi)
- Time zone: UTC+9 (Japan Standard Time)
- Phone number: 0551-22-1111
- Address: 1-3-1 Suijin, Nirasaki-shi, Yamanashi-ken 407-8501
- Climate: Cfa
- Website: Official website
- Symbols
- Bird: Falco tinnunculus
- Flower: Zelkova serrata
- Tree: Cherry blossom

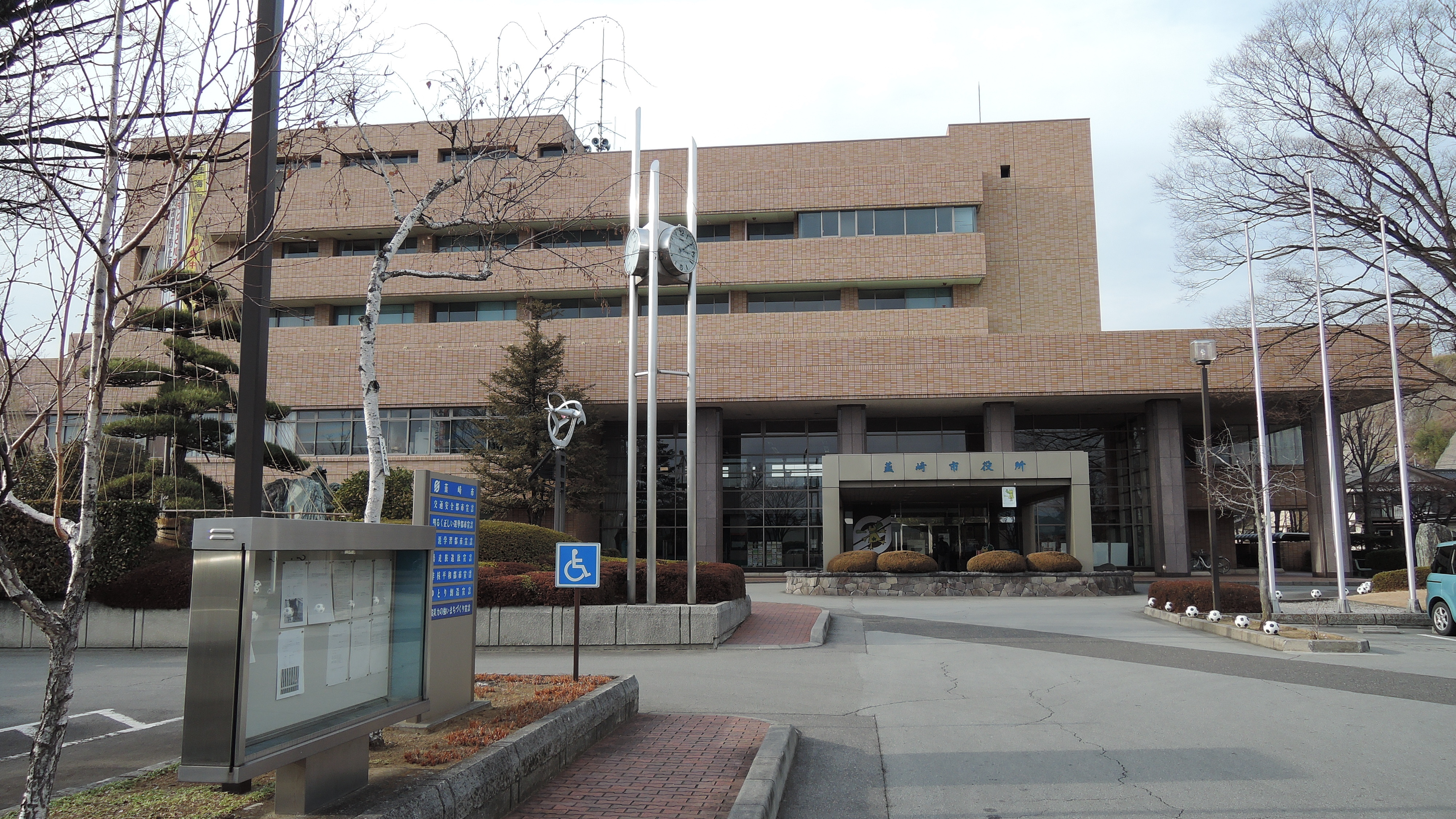
Nirasaki City Hall

Nirasaki (韮崎市, Nirasaki-shi) is a city in Yamanashi Prefecture, Japan. As of 1 October 2020, the city had an estimated population of 28,150 in 12831 households, and a population density of 210 persons per km^{2}. The total area is 132.69 square kilometres (51.23 sq mi).

== Geography ==
Nirasaki is located in the northwestern end of the Kofu Basin in Yamanashi Prefecture, bordered to the east by the Minami Alps National Park and the west by the Minami Alps Koma Prefectural Natural Park.

=== Surrounding municipalities ===
Yamanashi Prefecture

- Hokuto
- Kai
- Minami-Alps

== Climate ==
The city has a climate characterized by hot and humid summers, and relatively mild winters (Köppen climate classification Cfa). The average annual temperature in Nirasaki is 13.8 °C (56.8 °F). The average annual rainfall is 1,278 mm (50.3 in) with September as the wettest month.

Climate data for Nirasaki (1991–2020 normals, extremes 1977–present)
Month	Jan	Feb	Mar	Apr	May	Jun	Jul	Aug	Sep	Oct	Nov	Dec	Year
Record high °C (°F)	17.8 (64.0)	24.5 (76.1)	26.4 (79.5)	31.7 (89.1)	33.3 (91.9)	37.9 (100.2)	38.7 (101.7)	38.4 (101.1)	37.0 (98.6)	32.2 (90.0)	26.5 (79.7)	22.7 (72.9)	38.7 (101.7)
Mean daily maximum °C (°F)	8.0 (46.4)	9.6 (49.3)	13.7 (56.7)	19.6 (67.3)	24.1 (75.4)	26.5 (79.7)	30.1 (86.2)	31.6 (88.9)	27.4 (81.3)	21.4 (70.5)	15.7 (60.3)	10.4 (50.7)	19.8 (67.6)
Daily mean °C (°F)	2.0 (35.6)	3.4 (38.1)	7.2 (45.0)	12.7 (54.9)	17.5 (63.5)	21.1 (70.0)	24.6 (76.3)	25.5 (77.9)	21.8 (71.2)	15.8 (60.4)	9.6 (49.3)	4.3 (39.7)	13.8 (56.8)
Mean daily minimum °C (°F)	−3.2 (26.2)	−1.9 (28.6)	1.6 (34.9)	6.8 (44.2)	12.1 (53.8)	16.8 (62.2)	20.7 (69.3)	21.5 (70.7)	17.7 (63.9)	11.4 (52.5)	4.6 (40.3)	−0.8 (30.6)	8.9 (48.0)
Record low °C (°F)	−11.7 (10.9)	−11.9 (10.6)	−8.2 (17.2)	−4.1 (24.6)	2.7 (36.9)	8.0 (46.4)	14.6 (58.3)	13.5 (56.3)	7.0 (44.6)	1.2 (34.2)	−3.8 (25.2)	−9.2 (15.4)	−11.9 (10.6)
Average precipitation mm (inches)	47.8 (1.88)	49.0 (1.93)	94.8 (3.73)	88.7 (3.49)	96.6 (3.80)	124.0 (4.88)	154.3 (6.07)	114.3 (4.50)	190.0 (7.48)	158.6 (6.24)	55.7 (2.19)	39.1 (1.54)	1,212.9 (47.75)
Average precipitation days (≥ 1.0 mm)	4.8	5.0	8.7	8.1	8.5	10.9	11.9	9.0	10.2	8.8	6.0	4.7	96.7
Mean monthly sunshine hours	199.5	183.9	194.3	208.0	204.7	152.2	166.7	201.2	147.3	153.4	173.2	186.1	2,170.5
Source: Japan Meteorological Agency

== Demographics ==
Per Japanese census data, the population of Nirasaki has remained relatively steady in recent decades.

Historical population
Year	Pop.	±%
1940	25,804	—
1950	33,469	+29.7%
1960	30,244	−9.6%
1970	27,267	−9.8%
1980	27,343	+0.3%
1990	29,766	+8.9%
2000	32,707	+9.9%
2010	32,477	−0.7%
2020	29,067	−10.5%

== History ==
The area around present-day Nirasaki was the ancestral homeland of the Takeda clan, which dominated Kai Province in the Sengoku period. During the Edo period, the area was tenryō territory under the direct administration of the Tokugawa shogunate, and the village of Niirasaki was a post town on the Kōshū Kaidō highway. During the early Meiji period, the area was organized into 14 villages under Kitakoma District, Yamanashi. Nirasaki was elevated to town status on September 20, 1892. Modern Nirasaki City was founded by merger of Nirasaki with ten surrounding villages on October 10, 1954.

== Government ==
Nirasaki has a mayor-council form of government with a directly elected mayor and a unicameral city legislature of 18 members.

== Economy ==
The economy of Nirasaki is primarily agricultural.

== Education ==
Nirasaki has five public elementary schools and two public middle schools operated by the city government and two public high schools operated by the Yamanashi Prefectural Board of Education.

== Transportation ==
=== Railway ===
- East Japan Railway Company - Chūō Main Line
  - Nirasaki - Shimpu - Anayama

=== Highway ===
- Chūō Expressway
- National Route 20
- National Route 52
- National Route 141

== Sister cities ==
- Fairfield, California, United States
- Jiamusi, Heilongjiang, China

== Local attractions ==
- Nirasaki Asahi onsen
- Nirasaki Ōmura Art Museum
- Site of Hakusan Castle
- Site of Shinpu Castle, Takeda Hachiman-gu, Ganjo-ji

== Notable people ==
- Ichizō Kobayashi, industrialist
- Azuma Koshiishi, politician
- Satoshi Omura, scientist
