= Kasugaichō Station =

Railway station in Fuefuki, Yamanashi Prefecture, Japan

CO40 Kasugaichō Station 春日居町駅
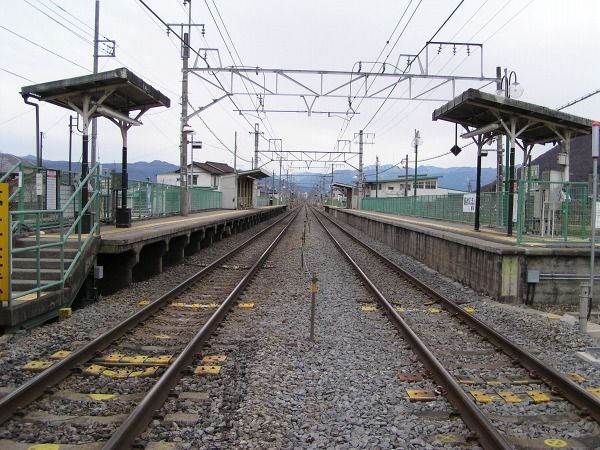
- Kasugaicho Station platforms in April 2018

General information
- Location: 392-5, Kasugai-cho Betsuden, Fuefuki-shi, Yamanashi-ken; Japan
- Coordinates: 35°40′25″N 138°39′33″E
- Operator: JR East
- Line: ■ Chūō Main Line
- Distance: 125.0 km from Tokyo
- Platforms: 2 side platforms
- Tracks: 2

Other information
- Status: Unstaffed
- Website: Official website

History
- Opened: 1 December 1954
- Former names: Betsuden Station (to 1993)

Passengers
- FY2010: 510

Services
Preceding station	JR East	Following station
Isawa-onsen CO41 towards Shiojiri	Chūō Main Line Local	Yamanashishi CO39 towards Tachikawa
Location
- Location within Yamanashi Prefecture Location within Japan

Kasugaichō Station (春日居町駅, Kasugaichō-eki) is a railway station of the Chūō Main Line, operated by East Japan Railway Company (JR East) in the Kasugai-Betsuden neighborhood of the city of Fuefuki, Yamanashi Prefecture, Japan.

== Lines ==
Kasugaichō Station is served by the Chūō Main Line, and is 125.0 kilometers from the terminus of the line at Tokyo Station.

== Station layout ==
The station consists of two opposed ground level side platforms serving two tracks, connected by a level crossing. The station is unattended.

=== Platforms ===
1	■ Chūō Main Line	for Kōfu, Kobuchizawa, and Matsumoto
2	■ Chūō Main Line	for Ōtsuki, Takao, Hachiōji and Tachikawa

== History ==
Kasugaichō Station was opened on 1 December 1954 as Betsuden Station (別田駅), a passenger station on JNR (Japanese National Railways). The station has been unattended since 1 October 1970. With the dissolution and privatization of JNR on 1 April 1987, the station came under the control of the East Japan Railway Company. The station was given its present name on 1 April 1993. Automated turnstiles using the Suica IC Card system came into operation on 16 October 2004.

== Passenger statistics ==
In fiscal 2010, the station was used by an average of 510 passengers daily (boarding passengers only).

== Surrounding area ==
- former Kasugai town hall
- Kasugai Elementary School

== See also ==
- List of railway stations in Japan
