= Isawa-Onsen Station =

Railway station in Fuefuki, Yamanashi Prefecture, Japan

CO41 Isawa-Onsen Station 石和温泉駅
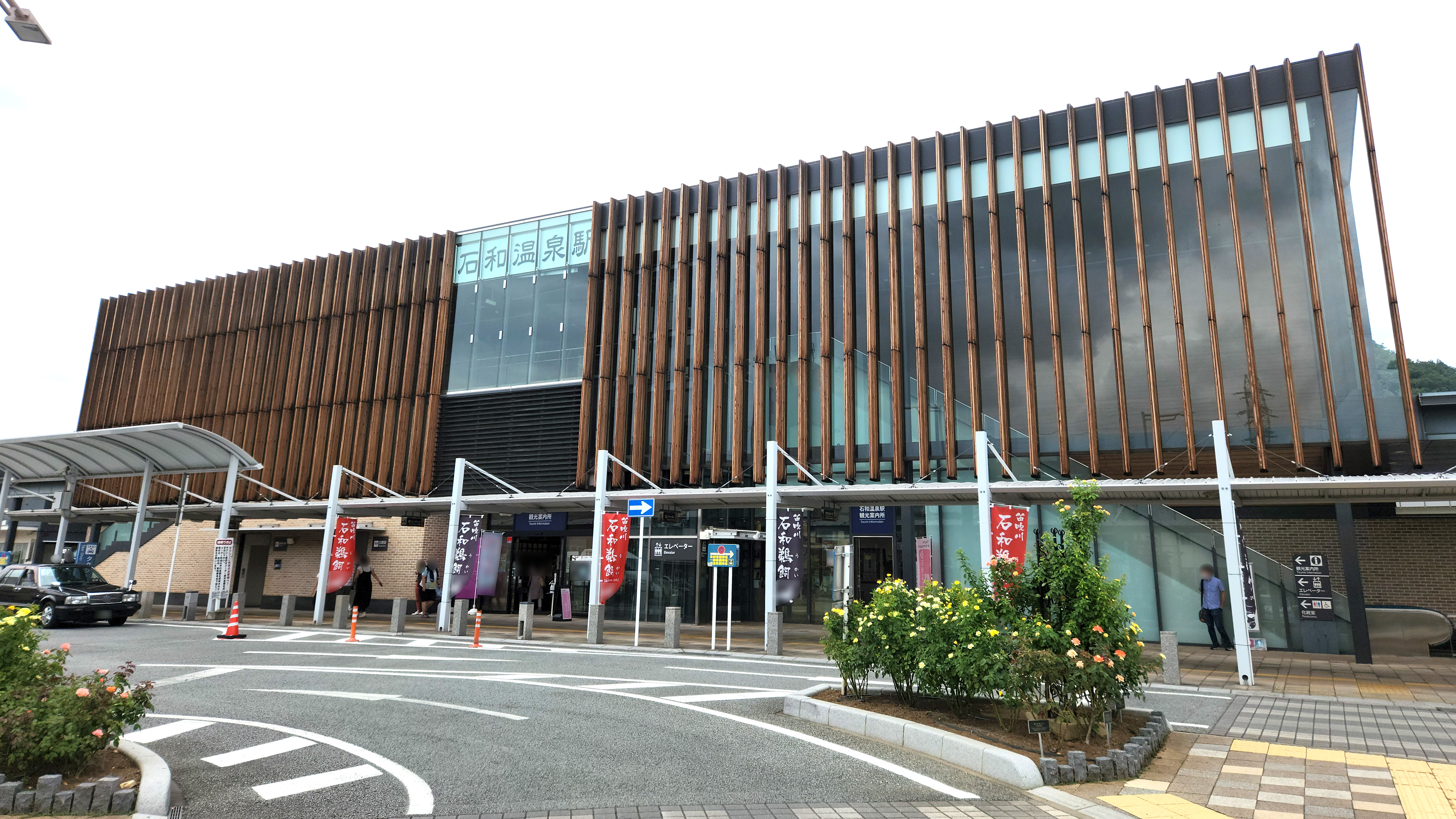
- The south-side building of the Station in August 2022

General information
- Location: 177-1, Isawa-cho Matsumoto, Fuefuki-shi, Yamanashi-ken; Japan
- Coordinates: 35°39′27″N 138°38′07″E
- Operator: JR East; JR Freight
- Line: ■ Chūō Main Line

Other information
- Status: Staffed (Midori no Madoguchi )
- Website: Official website

History
- Opened: 11 June 1903; 123 years ago
- Former names: Isawa (until 1993)

Passengers
- FY2024: 5,650 (daily) ▲4.59%

Services
Preceding station	JR East	Following station
Kōfu CO43 towards Hakuba	Azusa	Enzan CO39 towards Chiba or Tokyo
Kōfu CO43 towards Ryūō	Kaiji	Enzan CO39 towards Tokyo
Sakaori CO42 towards Shiojiri	Chūō Main Line Local	Kasugaichō CO40 towards Tachikawa
Location
- Location within Yamanashi Prefecture Location within Japan

Isawa-Onsen Station (石和温泉駅, Isawa-Onsen-eki) is a railway station of the Chūō Main Line, East Japan Railway Company (JR East) in the Isawa-Matsumoto neighborhood of the city of Fuefuki, Yamanashi Prefecture, Japan. It is also a freight terminal for the Japan Freight Railway Company (JR Freight).

== Lines ==
Isawa-Onsen Station is served by the Chūō Main Line, and is 127.8 kilometers from the terminus of the line at Tokyo Station.

== Station layout ==
The station consists of two ground level opposed side platforms serving two tracks, with the station building located above the platforms. The station has a Midori no Madoguchi staffed ticket office.

=== Platforms ===
1	■ Chūō Main Line	for Kōfu, Kobuchizawa, and Matsumoto
2	■ Chūō Main Line	for Ōtsuki, Takao, Hachiōji and Tachikawa

== History ==
Isawa-onsen Station was opened on 11 June 1903 as Isawa Station (石和駅) on the Japanese Government Railways (JGR). The JGR became the JNR (Japanese National Railways) after the end of World War II. Scheduled freight services were discontinued from March 1985. With the dissolution and privatization of the JNR on April 1, 1987, the station came under the joint control of the East Japan Railway Company and the Japan Freight Railway Company. The station was named to its present name on April 1, 1993. Automated turnstiles using the Suica IC Card system came into operation from October 16, 2004.

== Passenger statistics ==
In fiscal 2017, the station was used by an average of 2,961 passengers daily (boarding passengers only).

== Surrounding area ==
- former Kasugai town hall
- Kasugai Elementary School

== Surroundings ==
- Isawa Onsen
- National Route 140
- Fuefuki City Hall
- WINS Isawa (Off course betting facilities of JRA)

== Gallery ==
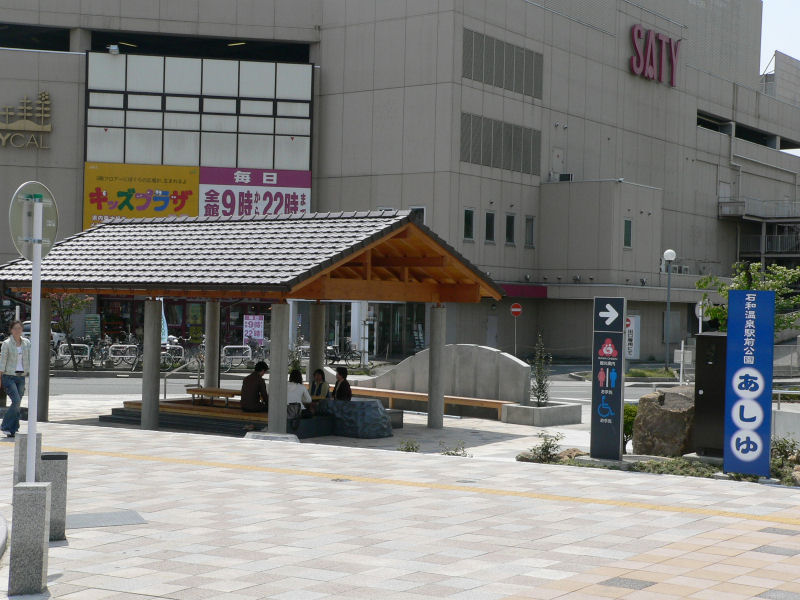
Ashiyu front of the Isawa-Onsen Station

== See also ==
- List of railway stations in Japan
