= Minami Alps Koma Prefectural Natural Park =

Prefectural Natural Park in Japan

- 県立南アルプス巨摩自然公園
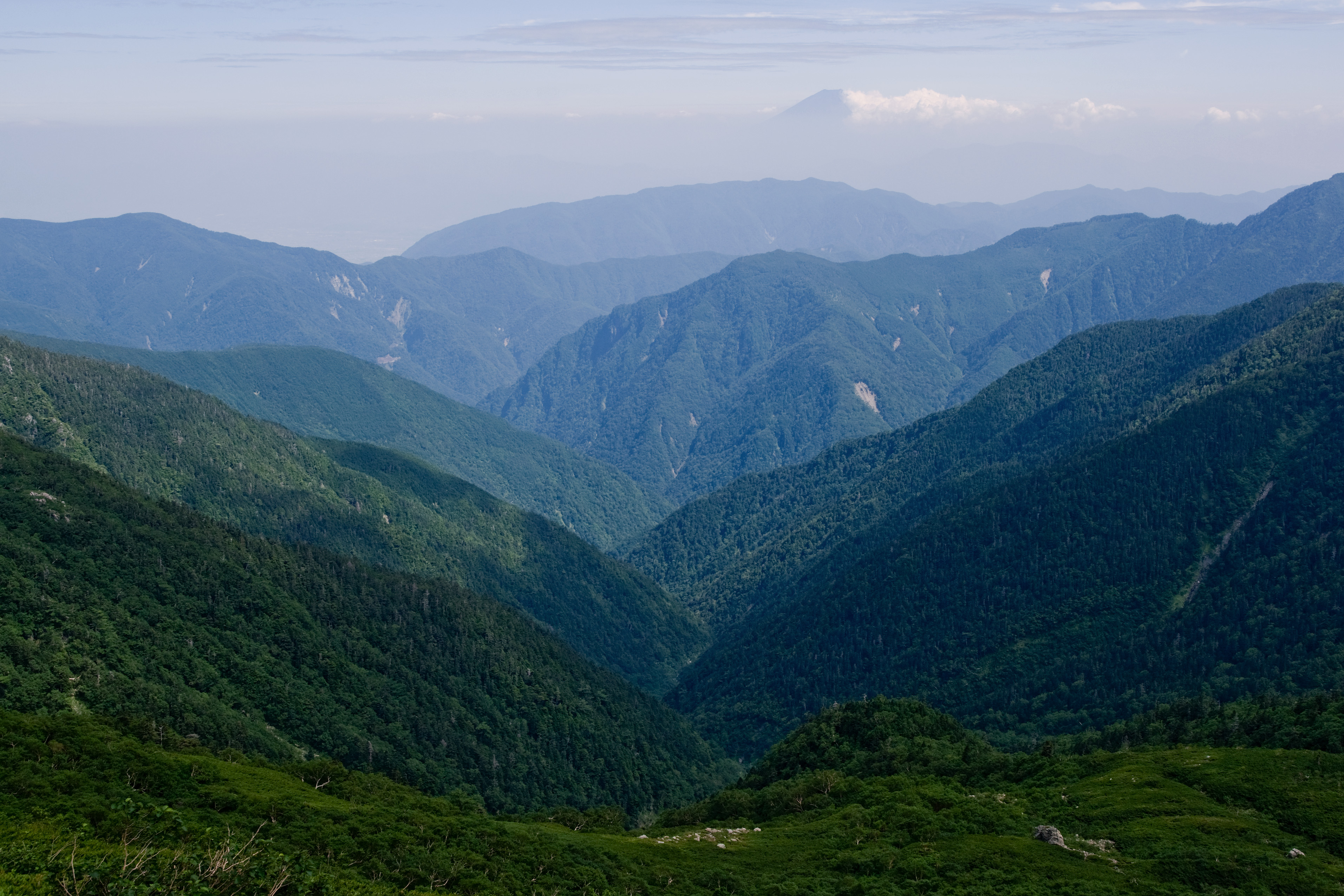
- Mount Kushigata

- Location within Japan
- Location: Yamanashi Prefecture, Japan
- Coordinates: 35°36′54″N 138°12′36″E
- Area: 148.41 km^{2} (57.30 sq mi)
- Established: 1 April 1966

Minami Alps Koma Prefectural Natural Park (県立南アルプス巨摩自然公園, Kenritsu Minami Arupusu Koma shizen kōen) is a Prefectural Natural Park in Yamanashi Prefecture, Japan. Established in 1966, the park's central feature is the Southern Alps. The park spans the municipalities of Fujikawa, Hokuto, Minami-Alps, Minobu, and Nirasaki.

== See also ==
- National Parks of Japan
- Minami Alps National Park
