= Tetsuya Matsumoto =

Japanese baseball player and coach (born 1984)

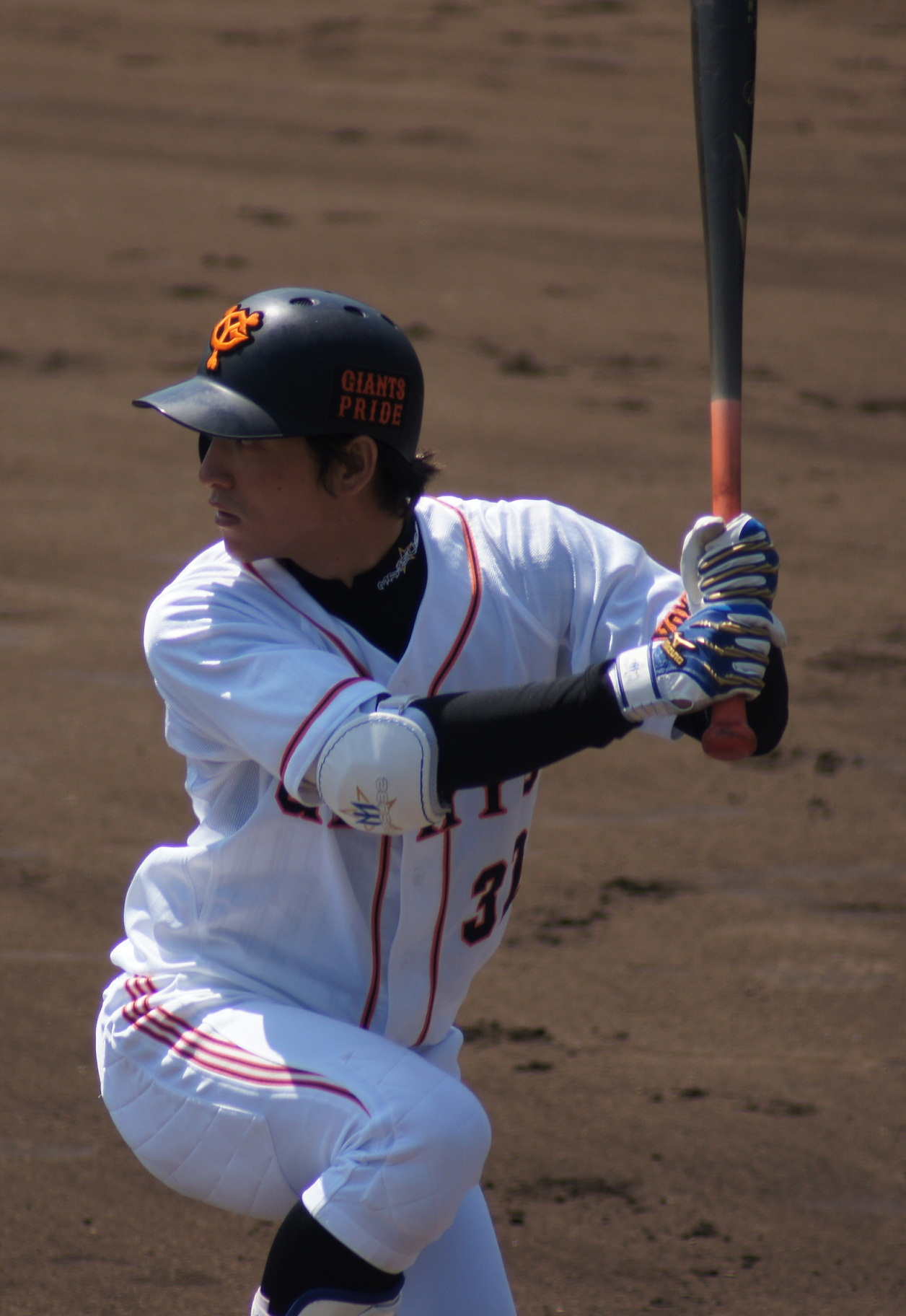

Hokkaido Nippon-Ham Fighters – No. 79
- Outfielder/Coach
- Born: July 3, 1984 (age 41); Yamanashi, Yamanashi
- Batted: Left Threw: Left

NPB debut
- May 28, 2008, for the Yomiuri Giants

Last NPB appearance
- August 26, 2016, for the Yomiuri Giants

NPB statistics
- Batting average: .263
- Hits: 336
- RBIs: 57
- Stats at Baseball Reference

Teams
- As player: Yomiuri Giants (2007–2017); As coach: Yomiuri Giants (2018–2022, 2025); Hokkaido Nippon-Ham Fighters (2026-present)

Career highlights and awards
- 2009 Central League Rookie of the Year; Mitsui Golden Glove Award (2009); 2009 Japan Series champion
- Last updated on: 2 January 2026

Tetsuya Matsumoto (松本 哲也, Matsumoto Tetsuya ; born July 3, 1984 in Yamanashi, Yamanashi) is a Nippon Professional Baseball player for the Yomiuri Giants in Japan's Central League. He was named the 2009 Central League Rookie of the Year.
