= Makioka, Yamanashi =

Makioka 牧丘町
- Former town
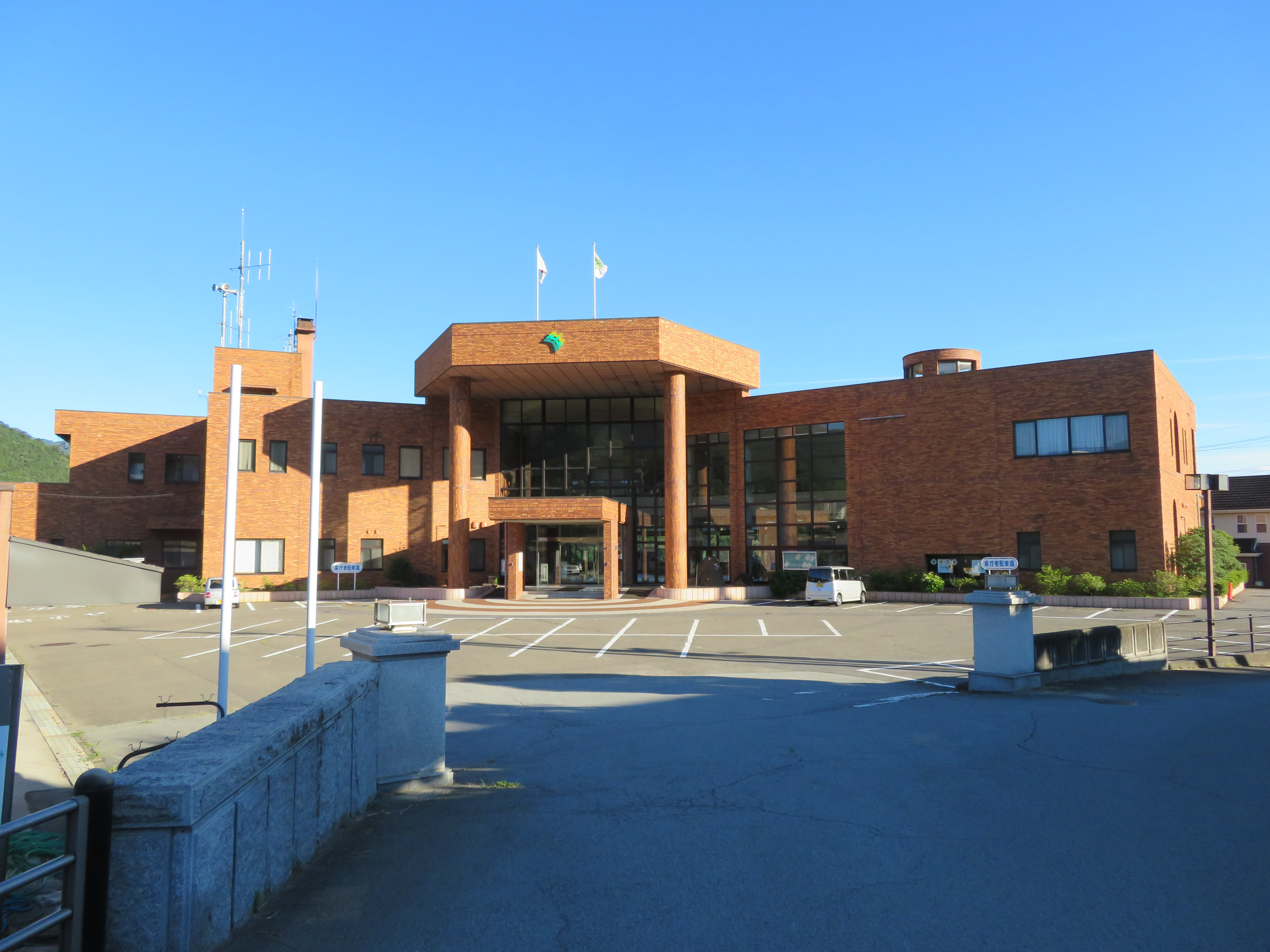
- Former Makioka Town Hall.
- Interactive map of Makioka
- Country: Japan
- Prefecture: Yamanashi
- District: Higashiyamanashi
- Established: —
- Merged into: 22 March 2005

Area
  - Total: 101.85 km^{2} (39.32 sq mi)

Population (2003)
  - Total: 5,797
  - Density: 56.92/km^{2} (147.4/sq mi)
- Time zone: JST

Makioka (牧丘町, Makioka-chō) was a town located in Higashiyamanashi District, Yamanashi Prefecture, Japan. As of 2003, the town had an estimated population of 5,797 and a density of 56.92 persons per km^{2}. The total area was 101.85 km^{2}.

== History ==
On March 22, 2005 Makioka and Mitomi (also from Higashiyamanashi District) merged into the expanded city of Yamanashi.

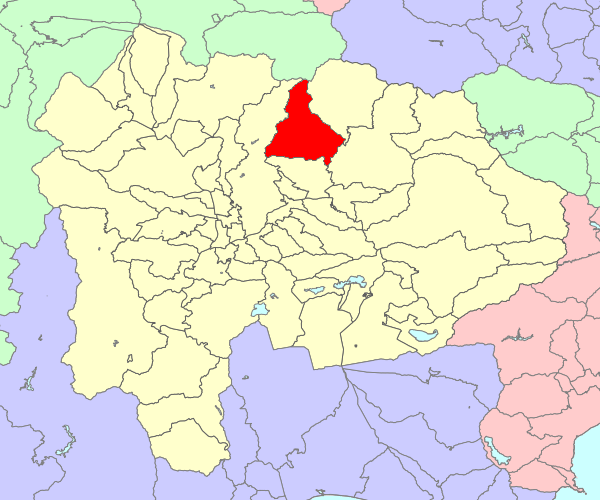
Location map of former Makioka town
