= Yamanashi (city) =

Yamanashi 山梨市
- City
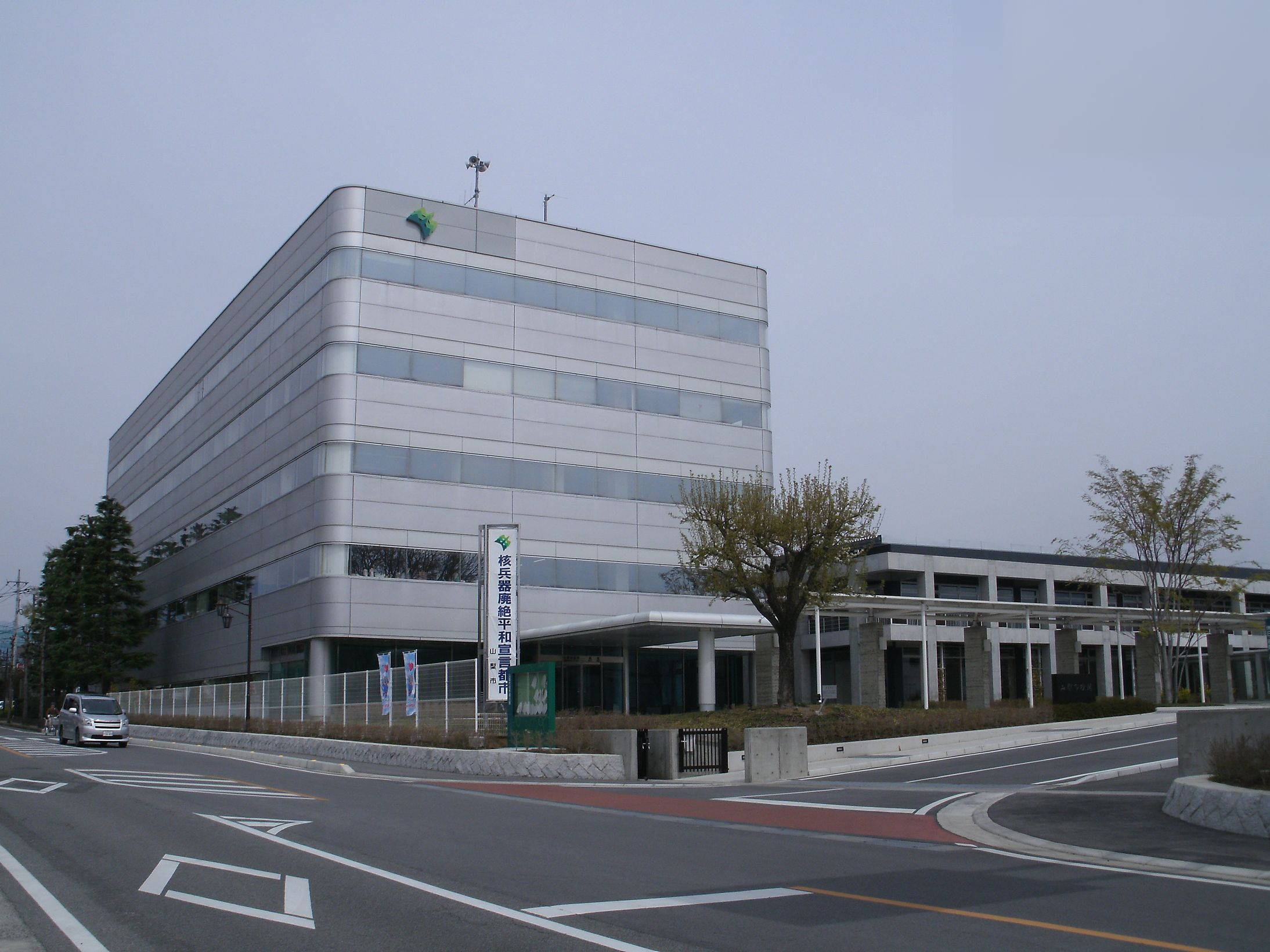
- Yamanashi City Hall

- Flag Emblem

- Location of Yamanashi in Yamanashi Prefecture

- Coordinates: 35°41′36.4″N 138°41′12.8″E
- Country: Japan
- Region: Chūbu (Tōkai)
- Prefecture: Yamanashi
- First official recorded: 111 AD
- City settled: July 1, 1954

Government
  - Mayor: Haruo Takagi (since October 2017)

Area
  - Total: 289.80 km^{2} (111.89 sq mi)

Population (July 1, 2019)
  - Total: 34,738
  - Density: 119.87/km^{2} (310.46/sq mi)
- Time zone: UTC+9 (Japan Standard Time)
- Tree: Pinus
- Flower: Azalea
- -Bird: Plovers
- Phone number: 0553-22-1111
- Address: West Kohara 843, Yamanashi City, Yamanashi-ken 405-8501
- Website: Official website

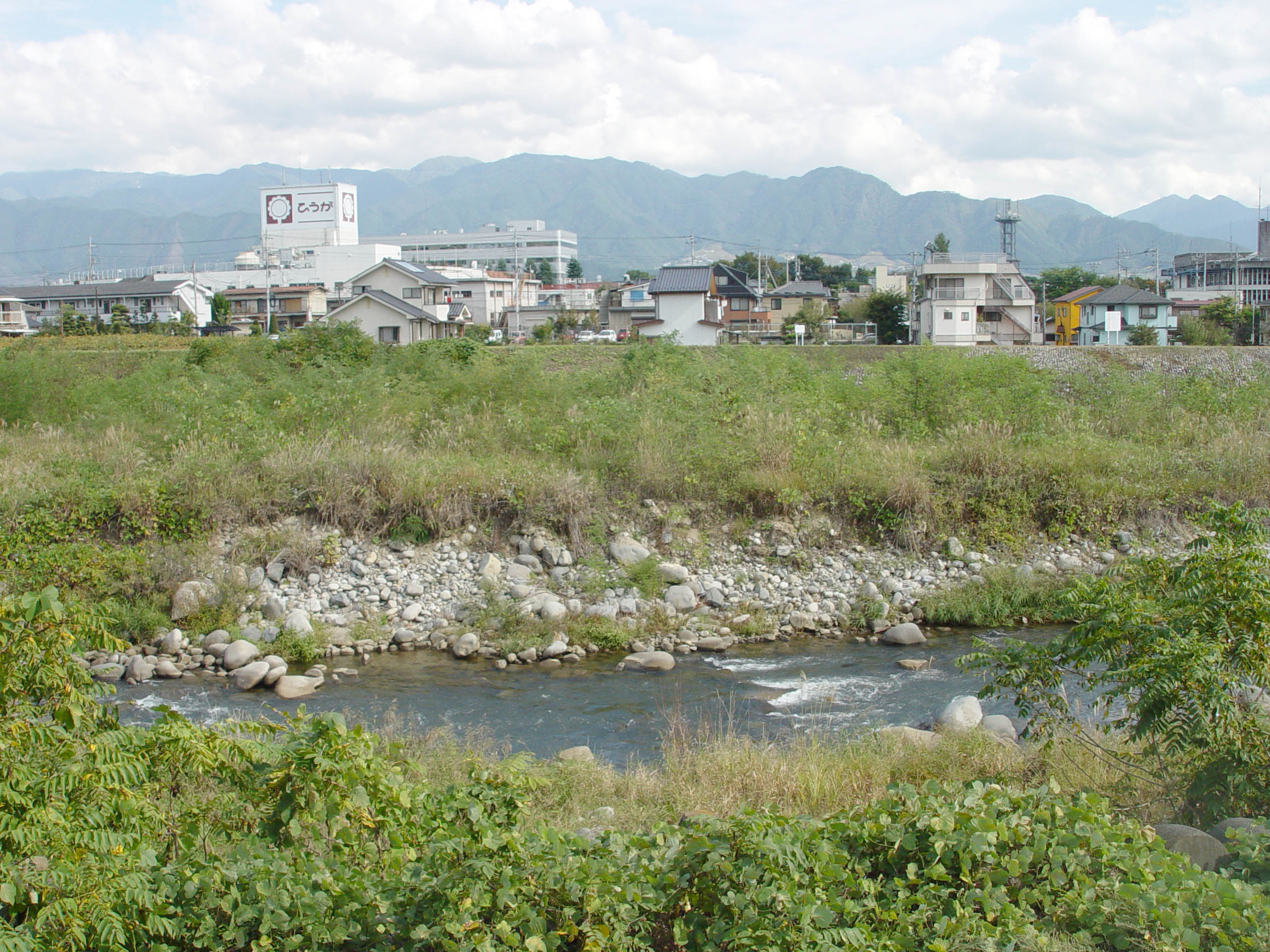
Yamanashi city center from the Fuefuki River

Yamanashi (山梨市, Yamanashi-shi) (Note: Japanese pronunciation: [jä̀.mä́.nä̀.ɕì, -nä́.ɕí.ɕì]) is a city located in Yamanashi Prefecture, Japan. As of 1 July 2019, the city had an estimated population of 34,738 in 14,679 households, and a population density of 120 persons per km^{2}. The total area of the city is 289.80 square kilometres (111.89 sq mi).

== Geography ==
Yamanashi City is located in north-central Yamanashi Prefecture in the northeastern end of the Kofu Basin. The city is flat in the south, rising toward mountains to the north. The Fuefuki River flows through the city.

=== Neighboring municipalities ===
- Nagano Prefecture
  - Minamisaku District: Kawakami
- Saitama Prefecture
  - Chichibu
- Yamanashi Prefecture
  - Fuefuki
  - Kōfu
  - Kōshū

=== Climate ===
The city has a humid continental climate characterized by characterized by hot and humid summers, and relatively severe winters (Köppen climate classification Dfb). The average annual temperature in Yamanashi is 6.4 °C. The average annual rainfall is 1834 mm with September as the wettest month. The temperatures are highest on average in August, at around 18.7 °C, and lowest in January, at around -5.5 °C.

== Demographics ==
Per Japanese census data, the population of Yamanashi has been in decline since the year 2000.

Historical population
| Year | Pop. | ±% |
|---|---|---|
| 1940 | 37,229 | — |
| 1950 | 46,185 | +24.1% |
| 1960 | 43,434 | −6.0% |
| 1970 | 38,748 | −10.8% |
| 1980 | 39,142 | +1.0% |
| 1990 | 39,263 | +0.3% |
| 2000 | 39,797 | +1.4% |
| 2010 | 36,832 | −7.5% |
| 2020 | 33,435 | −9.2% |

== History ==
The village of Yamanashi was founded on July 1, 1942, by the merger of two hamlets within Higashiyamanashi District. It was elevated to city status on July 1, 1954.

On March 22, 2005, Yamanashi absorbed the town of Makioka, and the village of Mitomi (both from Higashiyamanashi District).

== Government ==
Yamanashi has a mayor-council form of government with a directly elected mayor and a unicameral city legislature of 16 members.

== Economy ==
The economy of Yamanashi is based primarily on horticulture, with grapes and peaches as the main cash crops.

== Education ==
Yamanashi has 12 public elementary schools and three public middle schools operated by the city government and two public high schools operated by the Yamanashi Prefectural Board of Education.

== Gallery ==
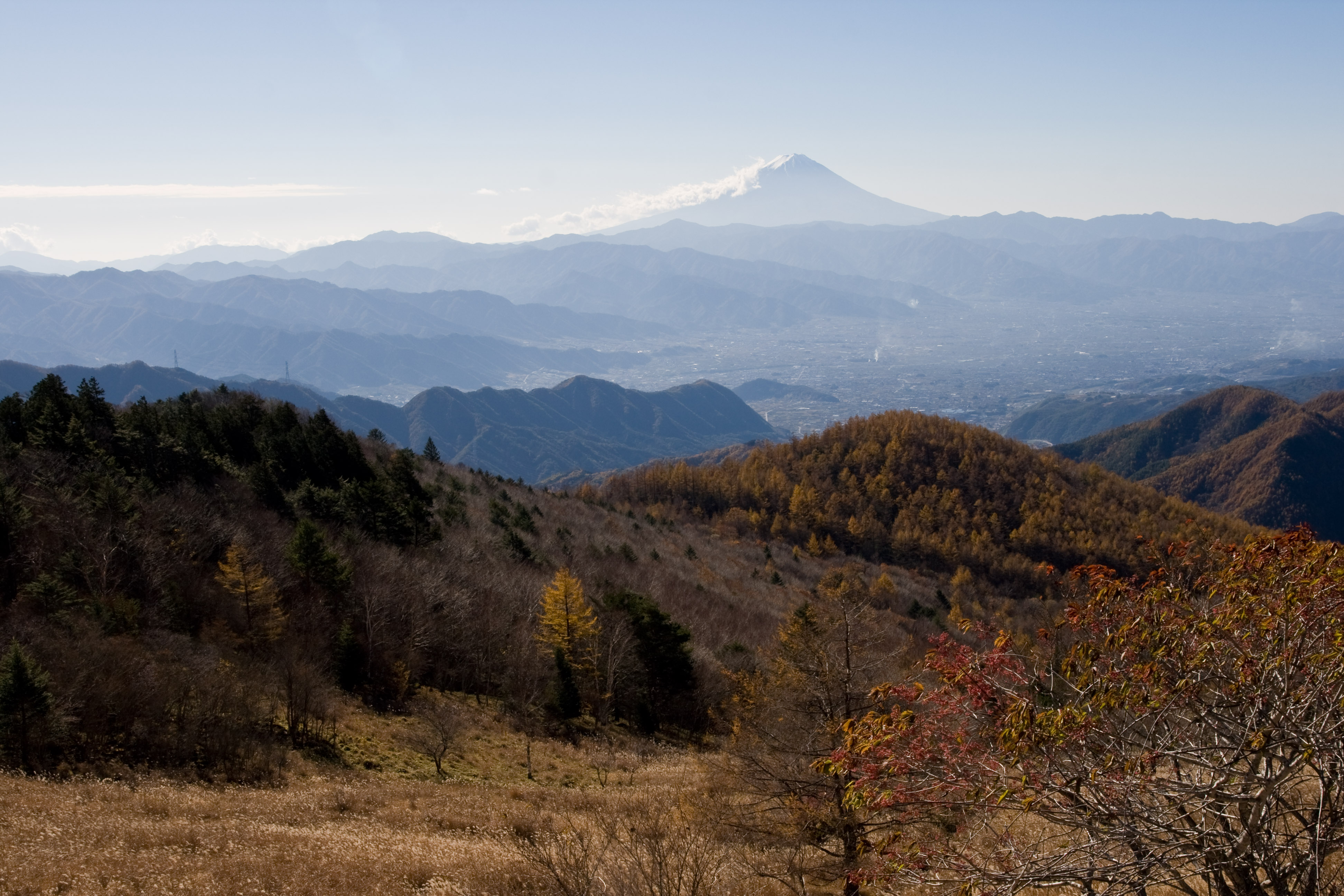
View of Mount Fuji from Mount Kentoku

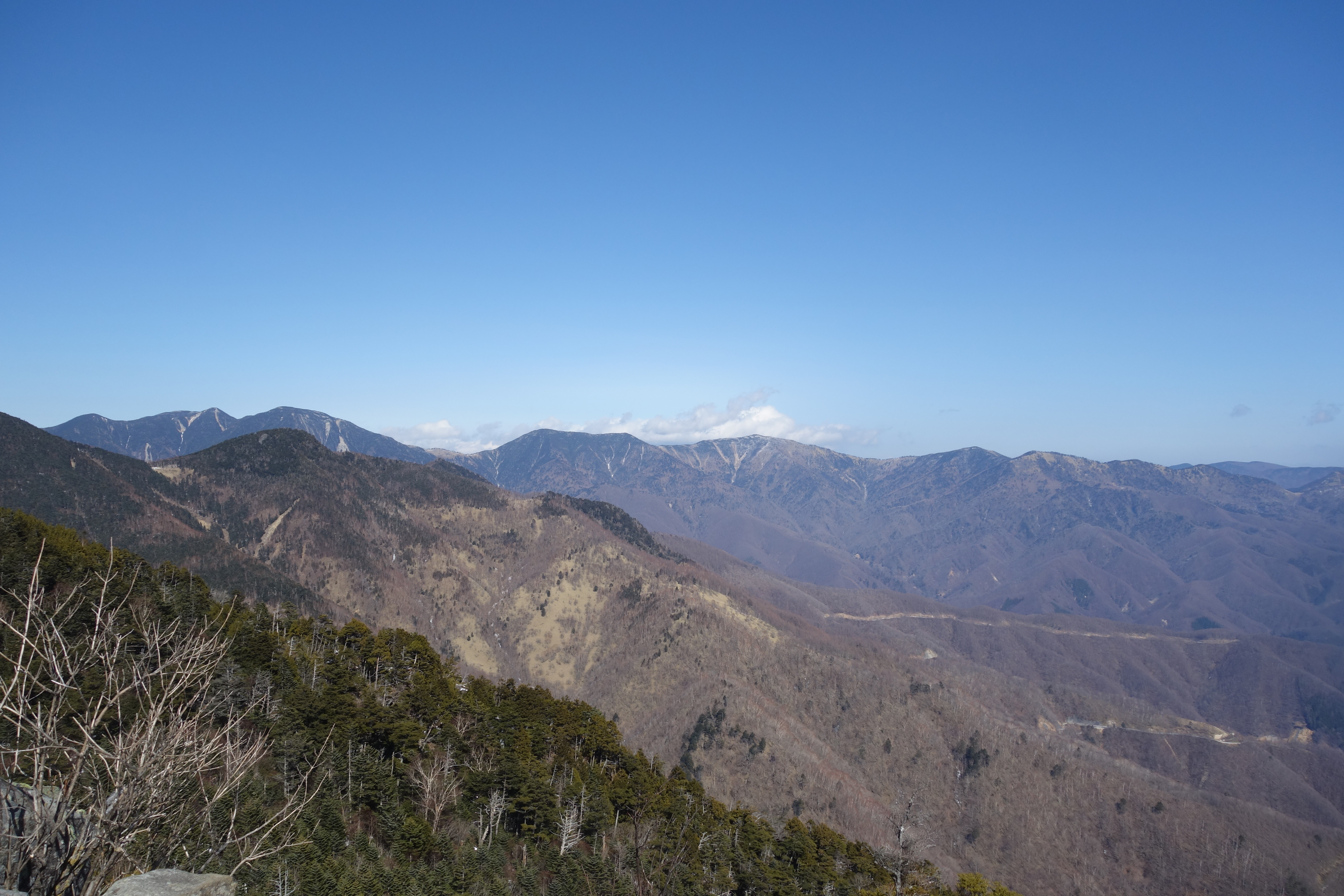
View of Chichibu Mountain Range, from Mount Kentoku

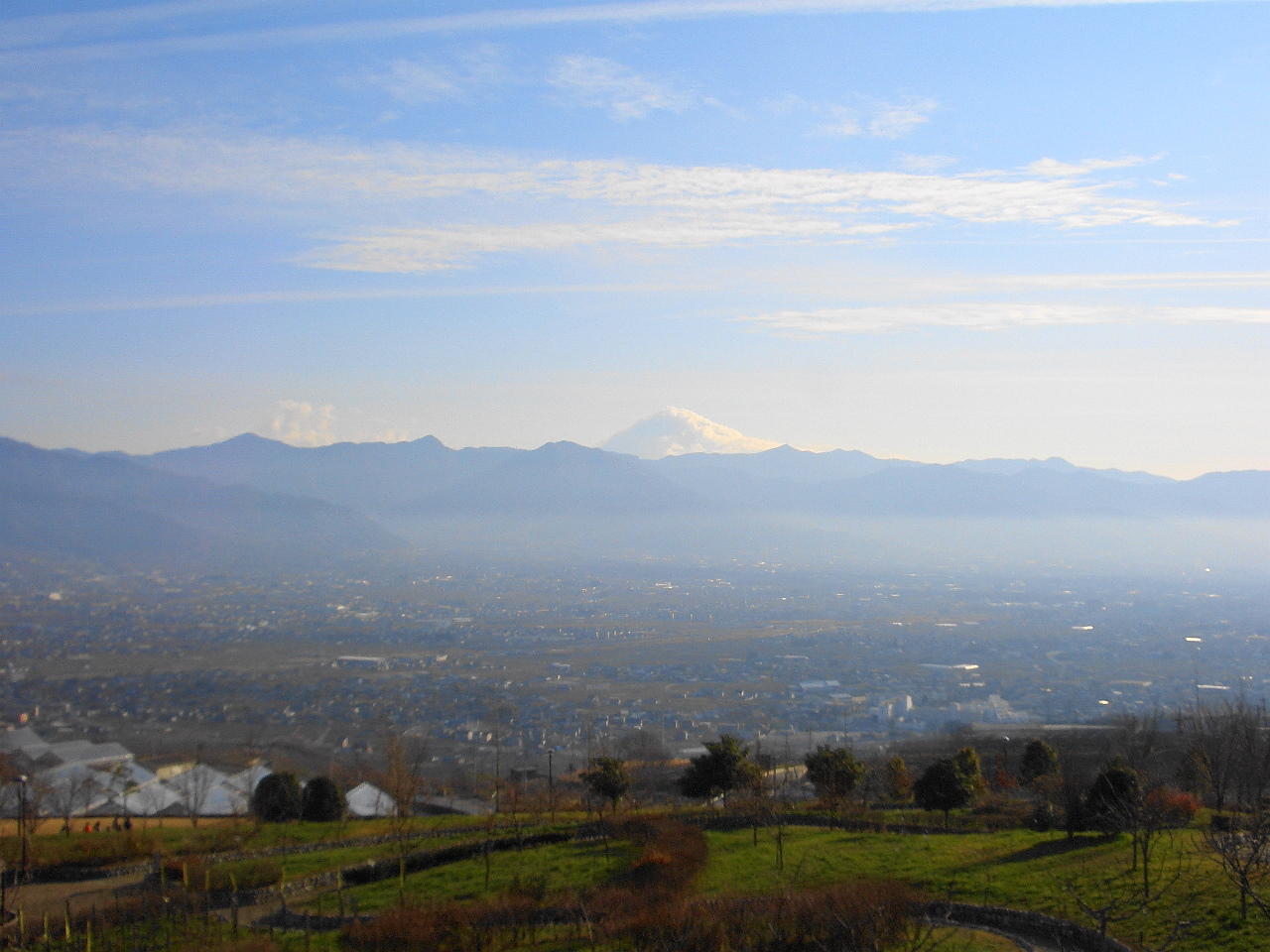
Panorama view of Yamanashi city and Kōfu Basin, from hill of Fuefuki River Fruit Park

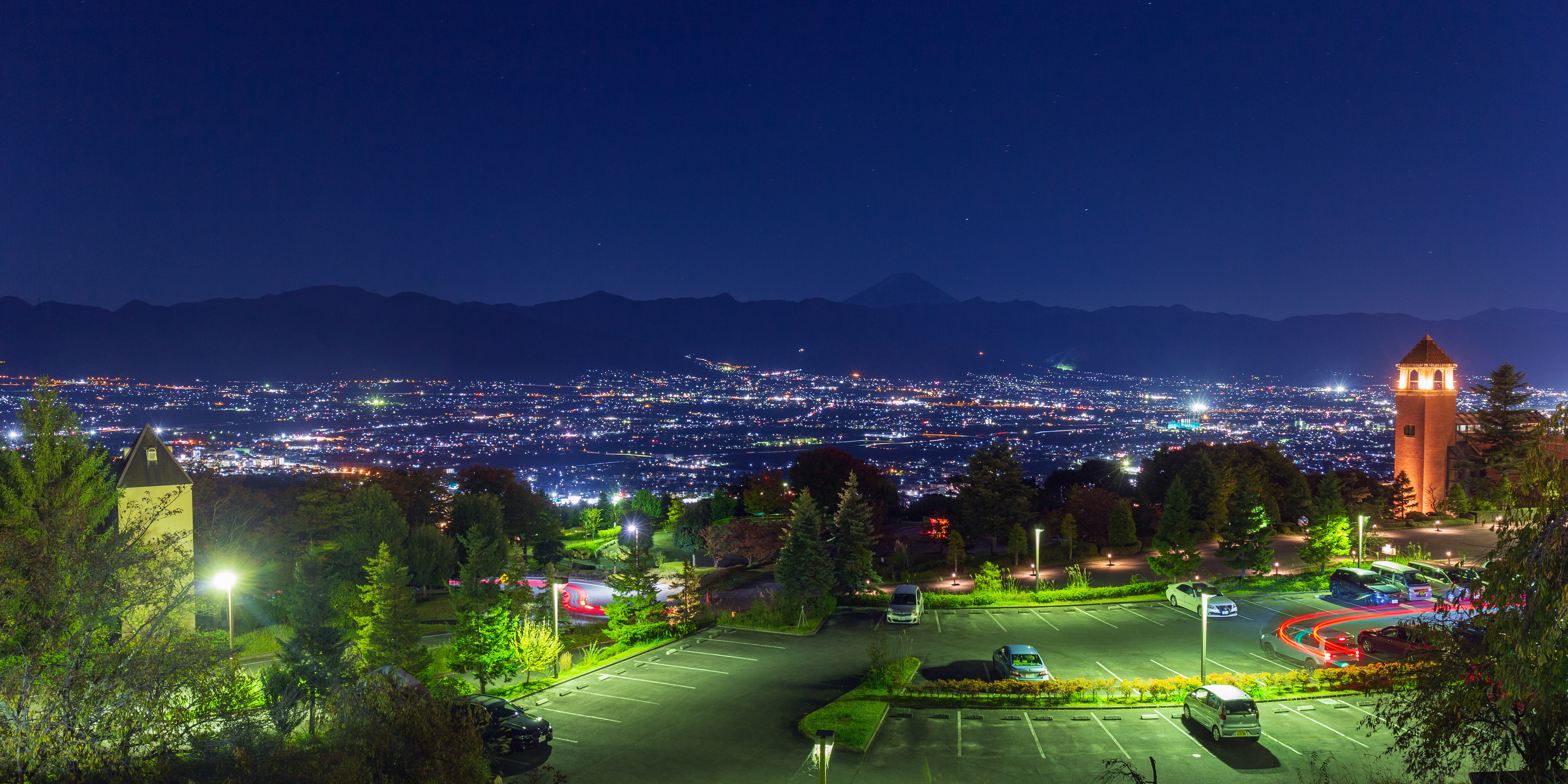
A night view of Kōfu Basin and Yamanashi city, from Fuefuki River Fruit Park

== Transportation ==
=== Railway ===
- East Japan Railway Company - Chūō Main Line
  - Yamanashishi - Higashi-Yamanashi

=== Highway ===
- National Route 140
- National Route 411

== Sister cities ==
- Sioux City, Iowa, United States, since November 6, 2003
- Xiaoshan District, Hangzhou, Zhejiang, China, friendship city since October 14, 1993

== Local attractions ==
- Oimatakubo-Hachiman-gu
- Seihaku-ji – Buddhist temple

== Notable people ==
- Nezu Kaichirō - Meiji era industrialist, politician and philanthropist. Founder of the Nezu Museum.
- Masahiko Kobe - celebrity chef, known for specializing in Italian cuisine, and known as "Iron Chef Italian" in Iron Chef
- Tetsuya Matsumoto – professional baseball player
- Kazufumi Miyazawa - musician, founder of rock band The Boom.
- Shirō Sano - actor
- Jumbo Tsuruta – professional wrestler
