= Mitomi, Yamanashi =

Dissolved municipality in Yamanashi prefecture, Japan

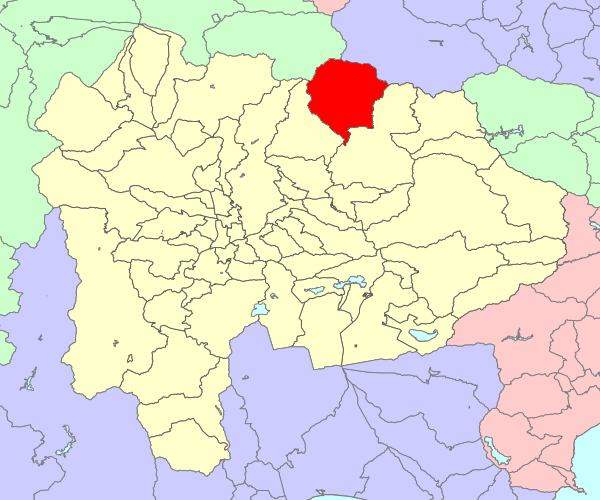
Location map of former Mitomi Village

Mitomi (三富村, Mitomi-mura) was a village located in Higashiyamanashi District, Yamanashi Prefecture, Japan.

As of 2003, the village had an estimated population of 1,287 and a population density of 9.54 persons per km^{2}. The total area was 134.91 km^{2}.

On March 22, 2005, Mitomi, along with the town of Makioka (also from Higashiyamanashi District), was merged into the expanded city of Yamanashi.
