= Seihaku-ji =

Seihaku-ji 清白寺
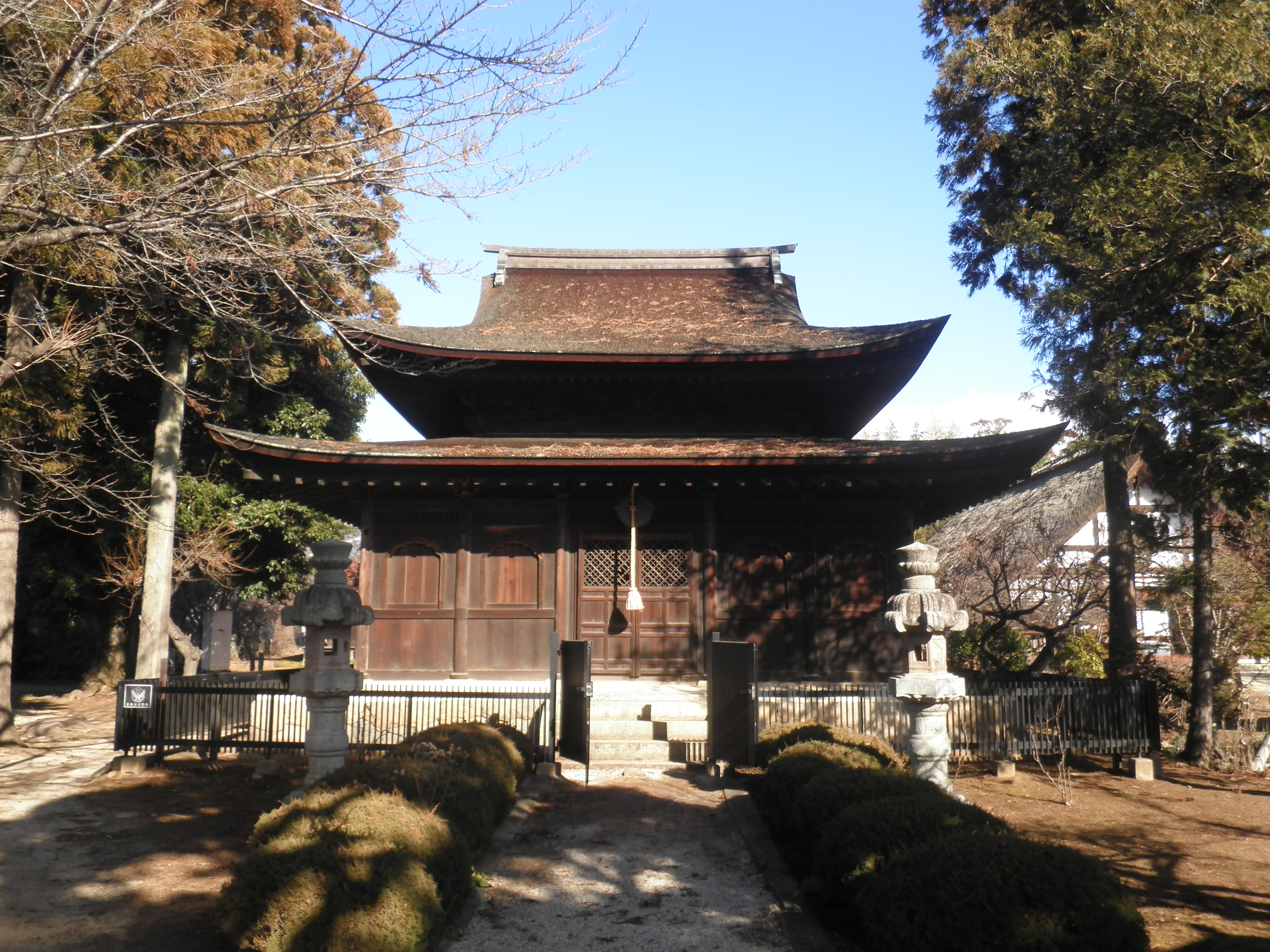
- Seihaku-ji Butsuden

- Seihaku-ji Seihaku-ji (Japan)

Religion
- Affiliation: Buddhism
- Deity: Shaka Nyōrai
- Rite: Myōshin-ji branch of Rinzai Zen

Location
- Location: 620 Sankasho, Yamanashi-shi, Yamanashi-ken
- Country: Japan
- Coordinates: 35°41′38″N 138°42′30″E

Architecture
- Founder: Ashikaga Takauji
- Completed: 1333 AD

Website
- seihakuji.com

Seihaku-ji (清白寺), is a Buddhist temple belonging to the Myōshin-ji branch of the Rinzai school of Japanese Zen Buddhism, located in the city of Yamanashi, Japan. Its main image is a statue of Shaka Nyōrai.

== History ==
Seihaku-ji was founded by Ashikaga Takauji in 1333 AD to pray for peace in the nation following the destruction of the Kamakura shogunate by Ashikaga forces in the Battle of Kamakura. Its founding priests were close disciples of Musō Soseki, and the temple's construction was supported by donations raised by Engaku-ji in Kamakura. Although Erin-ji in Kōshū was founded in 1330 by Musō Soseki himself, Saihaku-ji grew to become the leading temple of the Musō school in Kai Province during the Muromachi period. It transferred its allegiance to Kenchō-ji in Kamakura during the Muromachi period, and to Myōshin-ji in the early Edo period. Most of the temple burned down in 1682, with the exception of the Butsuden.

== Cultural properties ==
=== National Treasures ===
==== Seihaku-ji Butsuden ====
The Butsuden (仏殿) at Seihaku-ji was built in 1415. It is a 3x3 bay irimoya-zukuri structure with mokoshi, and was designated a National Treasure in 1955. Its precise construction date was learned from items found during dismantling for repairs in 1917. Its ranma (欄間) was damaged by the 2011 Tōhoku earthquake.

=== Important cultural properties ===
==== Seihaku-ji Kuri ====
The seigaku-ji kuri (庫裏) built in 1689-93 is representative of Edo period priests' quarters in the region and was designated an Important Cultural Property in 2005.

== Gallery ==
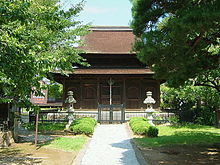
Butsuden (NT)

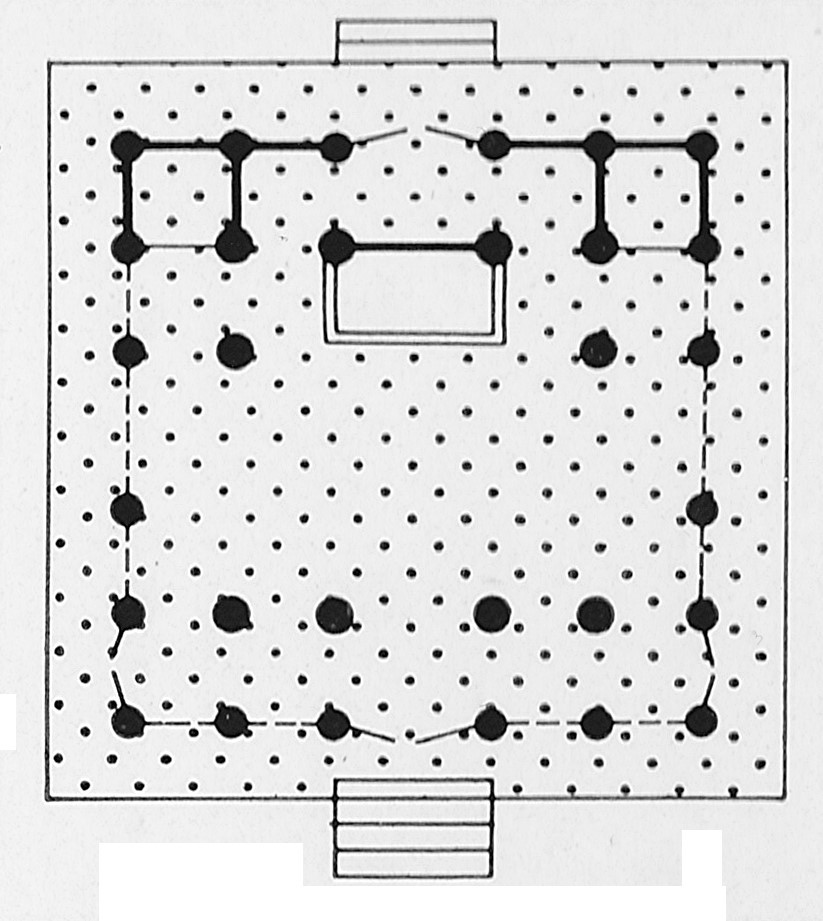
Butsuden plan

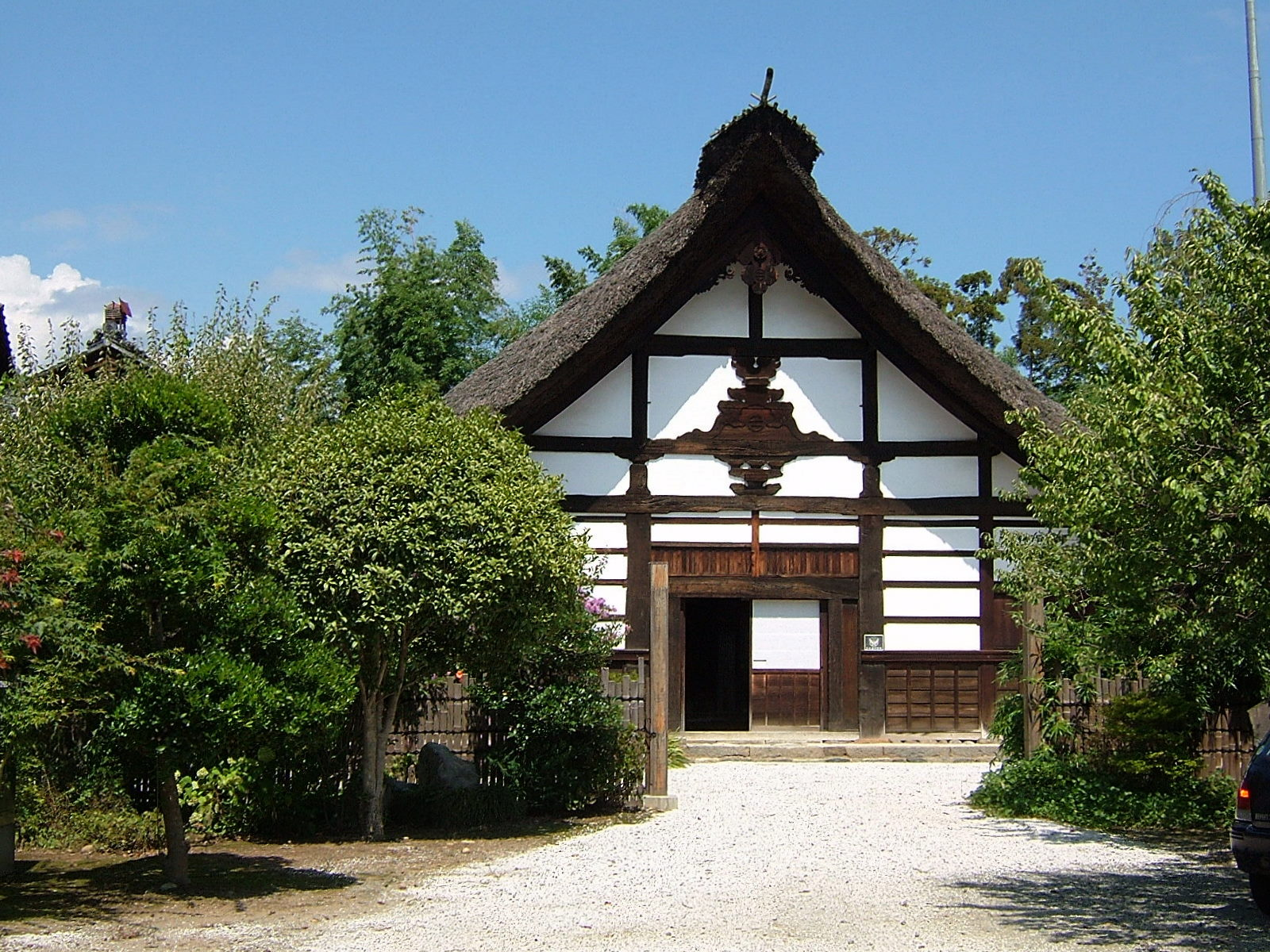
Kuri (ICP)

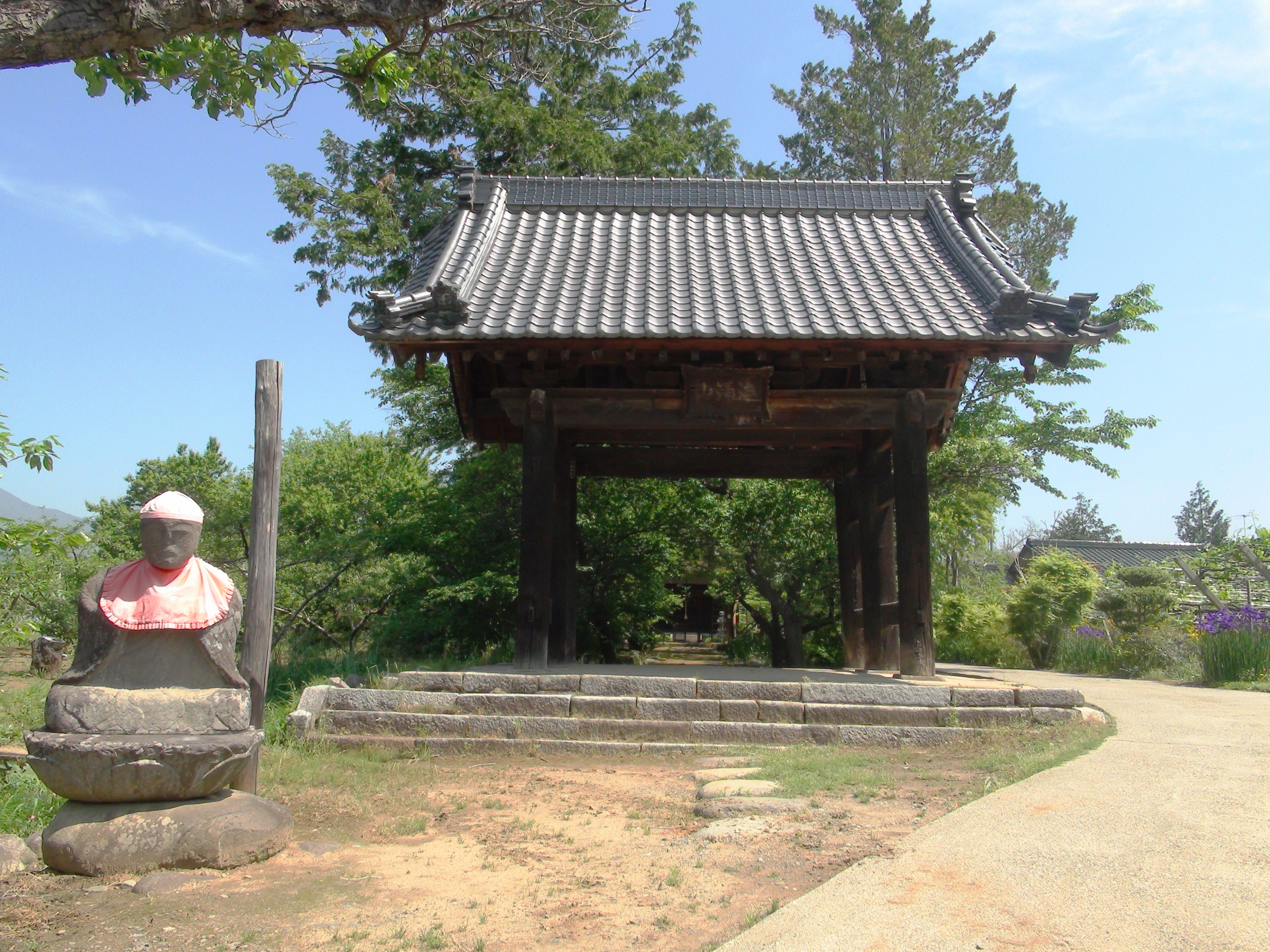
Sanmon
