= Yamanashi Gakuin University =

University in Kōfu, Yamanashi, Japan

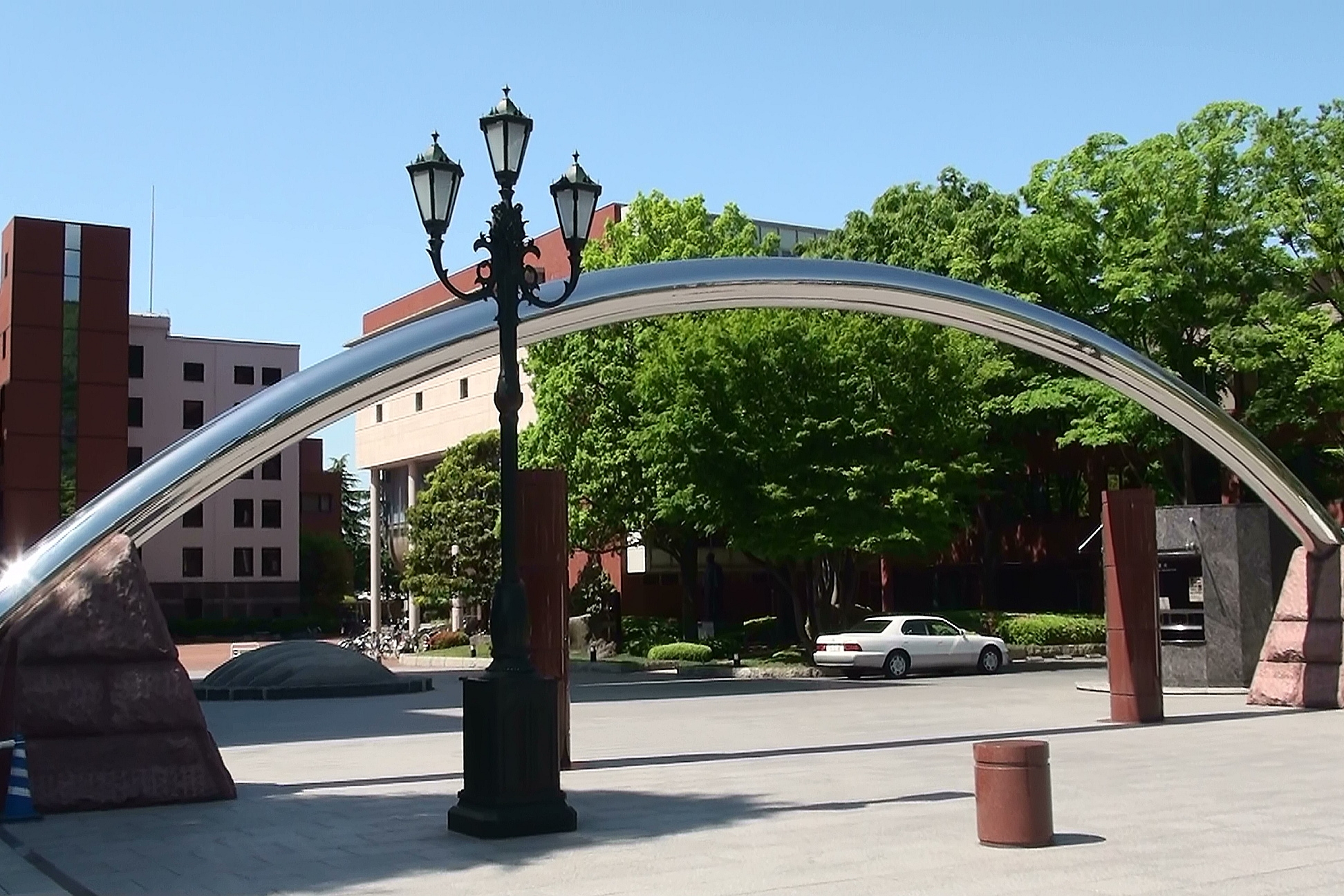
- Main Entrance of the Yamanashi Gakuin University
- Type: Private higher education institution
- Established: 1946
- Chairman: Koji Furuya
- President: Takako Aoyama
- Vice-president: Yoshiki Takeda, Hua Zhang
- Students: 4,200
- Undergraduates: 3,500
- Postgraduates: 40
- Other students: 80 in iCLA Program and 575 in Junior College
- Location: Kofu, Yamanashi Prefecture, Japan
- Campus: Urban
- Colors: Blue and red
- Website: www.ygu.ac.jp

Yamanashi Gakuin University (Japanese: 山梨学院大学, Yamanashi gakuin daigaku) (YGU) is a private university in Kōfu, Yamanashi Prefecture, Japan. Yamanashi Gakuin was founded in 1946. Today, it is a comprehensive educational institution that includes a kindergarten, elementary school, junior and senior high school, junior college, university and graduate school. YGU sits at the core of the whole institution.

== Faculties ==
- Faculty of Business Administration
- Faculty of Law
- Faculty of Sport Science
- International College of Liberal Arts
- Faculty of Health and Nutrition
- Graduate School of Policy Administration

== Areas of interest ==
Yamanashi Gakuin University is well known for a long-distance intercollegiate relay race and has produced 70 Olympians in its nearly 70-year history. Ten athletes participated in the London 2012 Summer Olympics–one of whom earned a medal in three swimming events, the first-ever Japanese female swimmer to do so. In 2004, YGU received a special prize from the Japan Olympic Committee and in 2010 and 2013 a special award from Japan's Ministry of Education, Culture, Sports, Science and Technology in recognition of their excellence in world sports. In 2020 Tokyo Olympic, 17 athletes participated in the event and two of them won gold medals.

== Notable alumni ==
- Naito Ehara (Class of 2015) - Olympic swimmer (Rio de Janeiro bronze medal)
- Kanae Yamabe (Class of 2012) - Olympic judoist (Rio de Janeiro bronze medal)
- Lien Chen-li (Class of 2011) - Olympic judoist
- Yuka Kato (Class of 2009) - Olympic Swimmer (London Bronze medal)
- Mekubo Mogusu (Class of 2009) - long-distance Runner
- Kazuyoshi Saito - musician
- Karolina Styczyńska - professional shogi player
- Satomi Suzuki (Class of 2013) - Olympic Swimmer (London silver and bronze medal)
- Takuto Otoguro - The youngest Japanese ever freestyle wrestling senior world champion
