= Yamanashi Gakuin Junior College =

Coordinates: 35°39′20″N 138°36′01″E

- 山梨学院短期大学
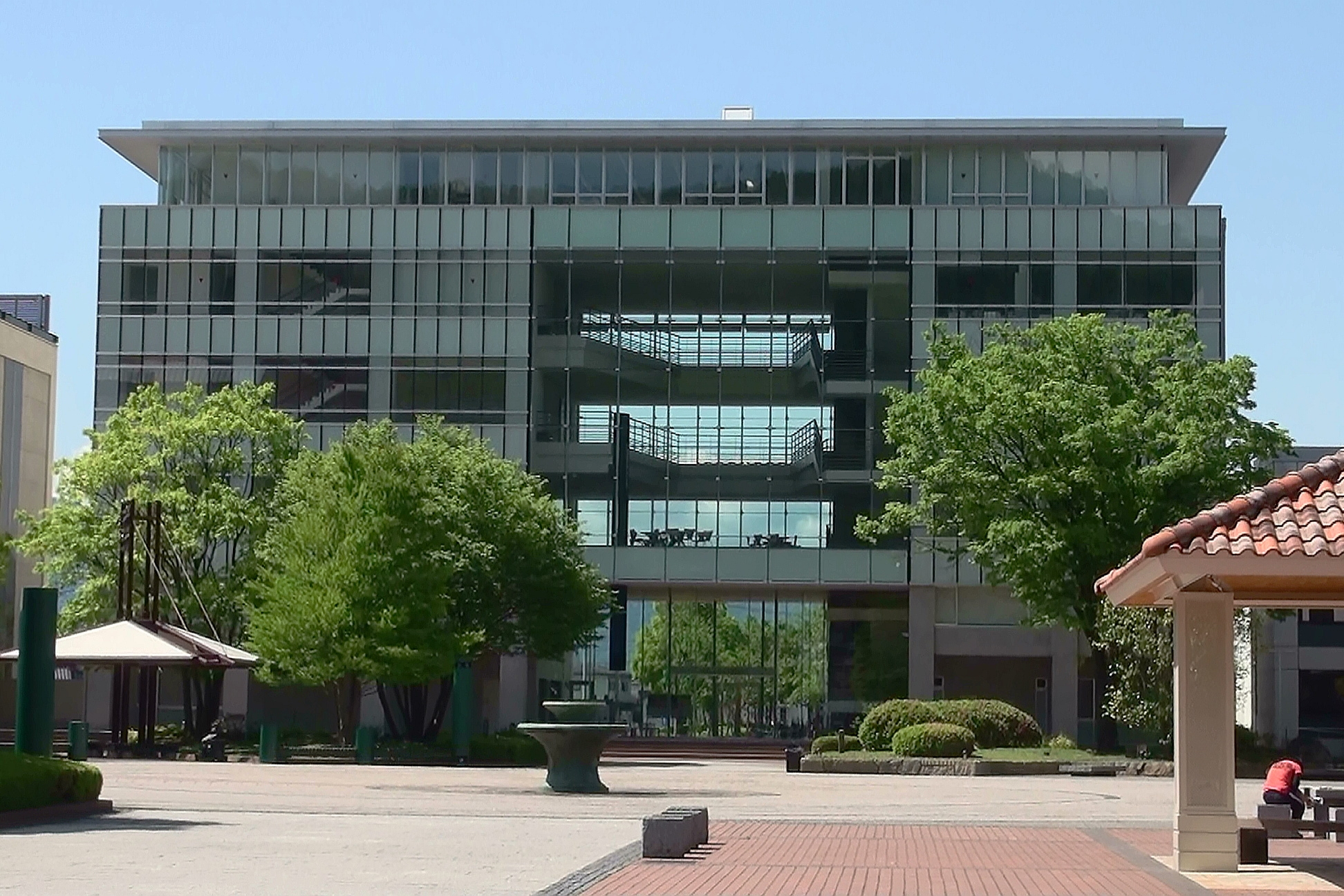
- Type: Private
- Established: 1951
- Undergraduates: 575
- Location: Kōfu, Yamanashi, Japan
- Campus: Urban
- Colors: Blue and Red
- Website: YGU Junior College

Yamanashi Gakuin Junior College (山梨学院短期大学, Yamanashi Gakuin Tanki Daigaku) is one of the private junior Colleges located at Kōfu, Yamanashi in Japan. It was established in 1951, and is now attached to Yamanashi Gakuin University. It consists of two departments.

== Department and Graduate Course ==
=== Departments ===
- Department of food and nutrition
- Department of early childhood education

== See also ==
- Yamanashi Gakuin University
