= Shinpu Castle =

Sengoku period Hirayama-style castle

- 新府城
- Nirasaki, Yamanashi, Japan
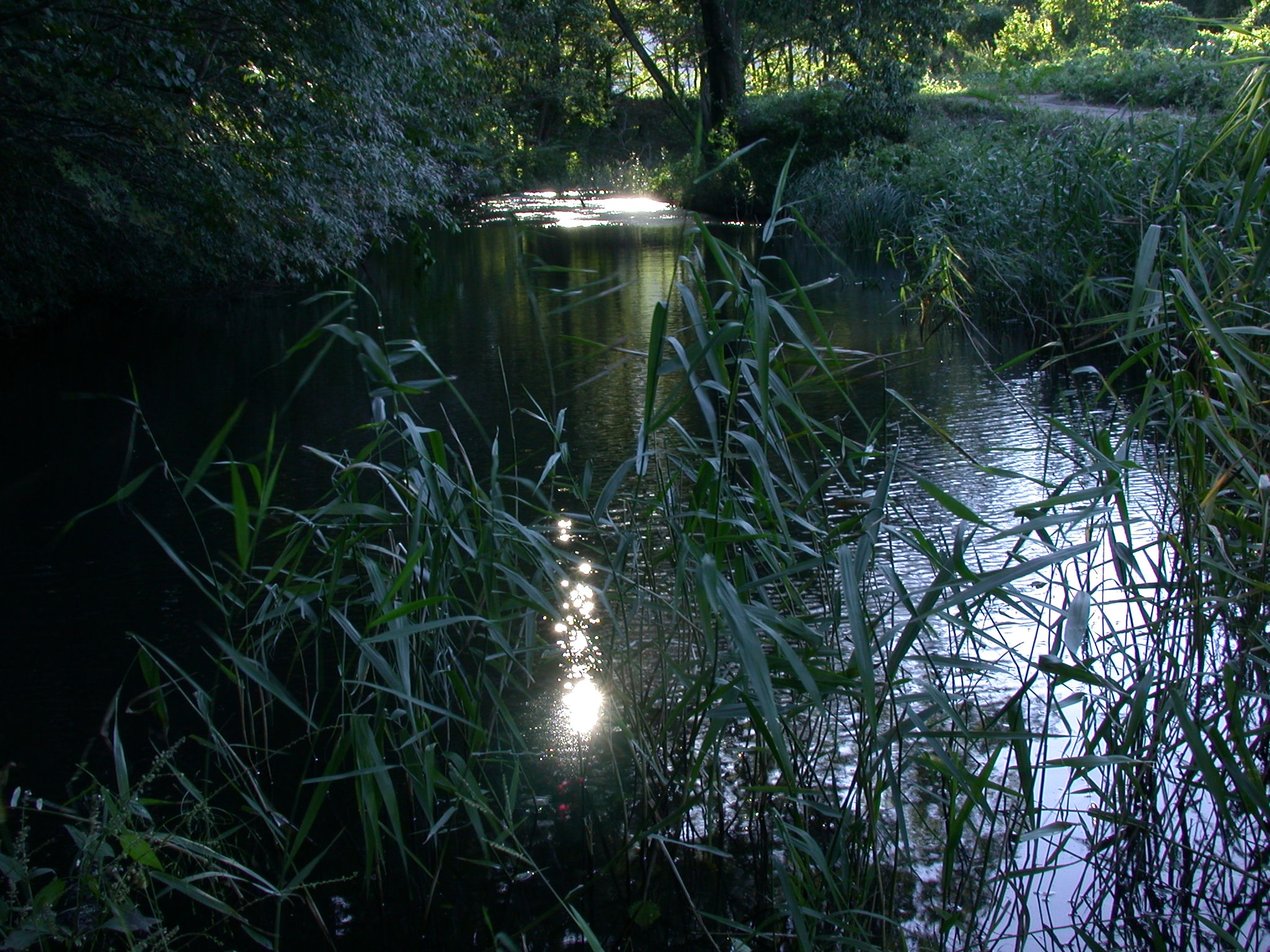
- Surviving moat of Shinpu Castle

Site information
- Type: hirayama-style Japanese castle
- Controlled by: Takeda clan
- Condition: Ruins

Location
- Coordinates: 35°44′09″N 138°25′31″E

Site history
- Built: 1581
- Built by: Takeda Katsuyori
- In use: until 1582

Shinpu Castle (新府城, Shinpu-jō) was a Sengoku period hirayama-style Japanese castle located in what is now part of the city of Nirasaki, Yamanashi prefecture. It was the primary fortress of the warlord Takeda Katsuyori. The ruins have been protected as a National Historic Site since 1973.

== Background ==
Shinpu Castle is located on a mountain with steep sides overlooking the Kamanashi River to the west of Kōfu, where Takeda Shingen's Tsutsujigasaki Castle was located. Following Shingen's death, his son and successor, Takeda Katsuyori initially successfully expanded his territory into eastern Mino Province; however, suffered a major defeat against Oda Nobunaga's matchlock-armed forces at the Battle of Nagashino, losing four of his top generals. Following this defeat, the Takeda found themselves surrounded by increasing aggressive neighbors, including the Oda, the Tokugawa clan, the Uesugi clan and the Odawara Hōjō clan. Katsuyori felt that a castle located near the center of his domains would be easier to defend, and over the objections of many of his surviving vassals relocated from Tsutsujigasaki Castle in 1581.

== Structure ==
The castle is located on a hill with steep cliffs which was created by an ancient lava flow from Mount Yatsugatake and erosion by the Kamanashi River. The defenses enclosed an area 500 meters long by 200 meters wide in a north-to-south orientation. The Inner bailey was a square enclosure at the top of the hill, and connects to the main gate, which was located to the west, via a second bailey. The layout thus somewhat resembles the layout of Tsutsujigasaki Castle. South of the central area was a large third bailey, which was approximately 100 meters long and divided into two kuruwa enclosures by a clay wall. The main gate of the castle was also fortified by a half-circular fortification with a dry moat. The northern side of the castle was also fortified by two protections, which extended into a water moat. Construction of the castle took only eight months and was overseen by Sanada Masayuki.

== History ==
In early 1582, before the castle or its jōkamachi were even complete, an alliance between Oda Nobunaga and Tokugawa Ieyasu invaded the Takeda holdings in Shinano Province after the defection of Kiso Yoshimasa. Takatō Castle fell after only one day, and many Takeda retainers defected or simply ran away. The Oda-Tokugawa alliance advanced into Kai Province, and laid siege to Shinpu Castle at Battle of Tenmokuzan. Takeda Katsuyori was unable to hold the castle with his remaining 300-400 men, so on March 3, 1582, he set fire to Shinpu Castle and fled into the mountains, attempting to reach another Takeda stronghold, Iwadono Castle, held by Oyamada Nobushige, an old Takeda retainer. At the time, Sanada Masayuki had advised Katsuyori to make for Iwabitsu Castle instead, but he would not listen. Katsuyori was denied entry by Oyamada, and committed suicide while the last remnant of his army held off their pursuers.

Oda Nobunaga sent Kawajiri Hidetaka to take control of the castle while Tokugawa Ieyasu conducted mopping up operations against the remnants of the Takeda forces. It became Ieyasu's stronghold while he fought off an invasion of the province the Odawara Hōjō. Afterwards, the castle was allowed to fall completely into ruins.

Today, no structures remain of the castle except for the remnants of some dry moats and earthenworks. The site of the former Inner bailey of the castle is now occupied by a Shinto shrine. The castle was listed as one of the Continued Top 100 Japanese Castles in 2017. It is located a 10-minute walk from Shinpu Station on the JR East Chūō Main Line.

== See also ==
- List of Historic Sites of Japan (Yamanashi)
