= Nirasaki Station =

Railway station in Nirasaki, Yamanashi Prefecture, Japan

CO46 Nirasaki Station 韮崎駅
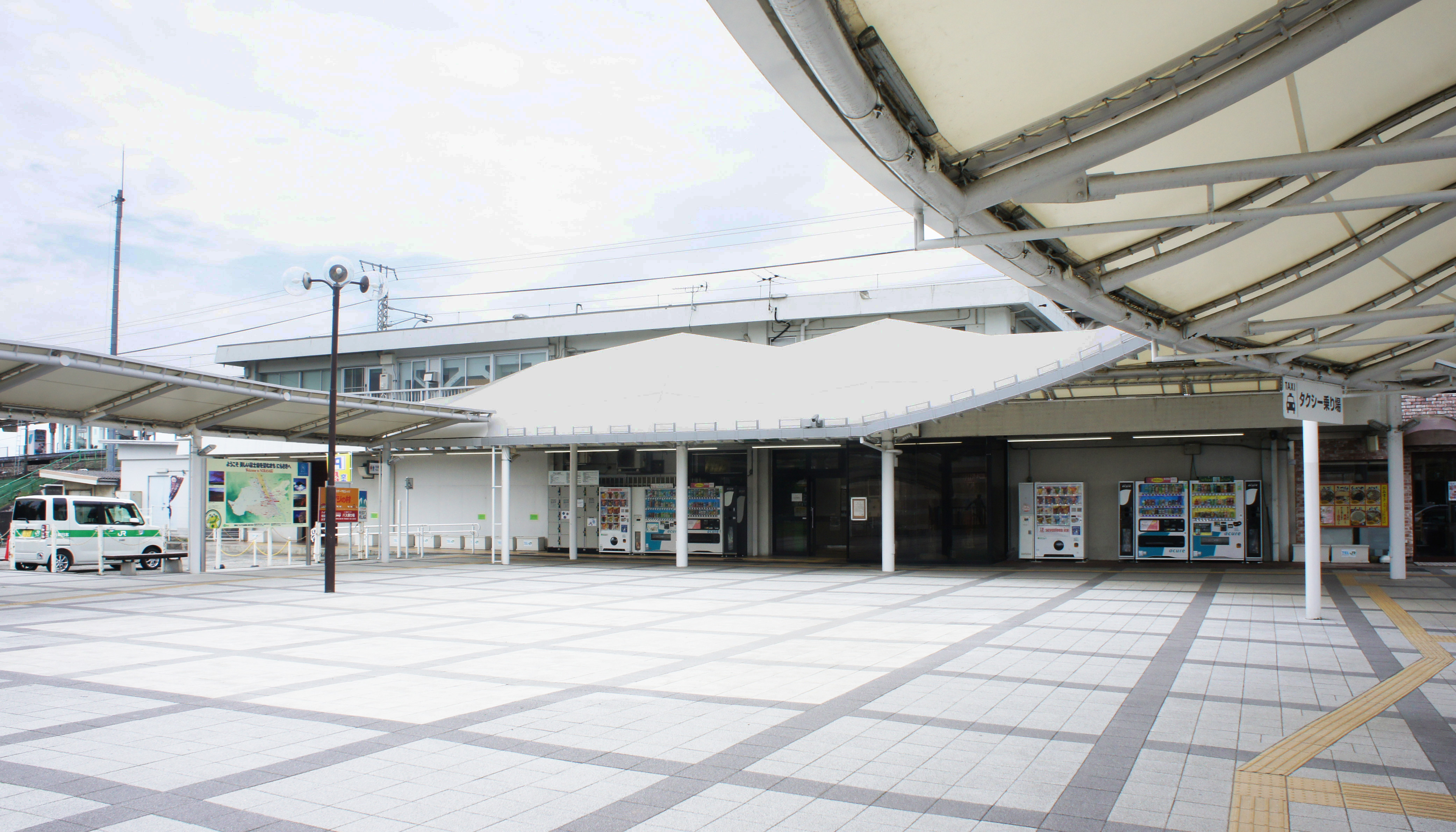
- Nirasaki Station in June 2021

General information
- Location: 1-1, Wakamiya 1-chome, Nirasaki-shi, Yamanashi-ken; Japan
- Coordinates: 35°42′37″N 138°27′03″E
- Line: ■ Chūō Main Line
- Distance: 154.7 km from Tokyo
- Platforms: 1 island platform
- Tracks: 2

Other information
- Status: Staffed (Midori no Madoguchi )
- Website: Official website

History
- Opened: 15 December 1903; 122 years ago

Passengers
- FY2024: 4,986 (daily) ▲5.05%

Services
Preceding station	JR East	Following station
Kobuchizawa CO51 towards Hakuba	Azusa	Kōfu CO43 towards Chiba or Tokyo
Shimpu CO47 towards Shiojiri	Chūō Main Line Local	Shiozaki CO45 towards Tachikawa
Location
- Location within Yamanashi Prefecture Location within Japan

Nirasaki Station (韮崎駅, Nirasaki-eki) is a railway station of the Chūō Main Line, East Japan Railway Company (JR East) in Wakamiya 1-chōme, in the city of Nirasaki, Yamanashi Prefecture, Japan.

== Lines ==
Nirasaki Station is served by the Chūō Main Line, and is 147.0 kilometers from the terminus of the line at Tokyo Station.

== Station layout ==
The station consists of a single island platform connected to the two-story station building by a footbridge. The station has a Midori no Madoguchi staffed ticket office.

=== Platforms ===
west	■ Chūō Main Line	for Shiojiri and Matsumoto
east	■ Chūō Main Line	for Kōfu, Enzan, Ōtsuki and Tachikawa

== History ==
Nirasaki Station was opened on 15 December 1903 on the Japanese Government Railways (JGR) Chūō Main Line when the line was extended from Kōfu. The track was further extended from this station to Fujimi on 21 December 1904. The JGR became the JNR (Japanese National Railways) after the end of World War II. With the dissolution and privatization of the JNR on 1 April 1987, the station came under the control of the East Japan Railway Company. Automated turnstiles using the Suica IC Card system came into operation from October 16, 2004.

== Passenger statistics ==
In fiscal 2010, the station was used by an average of 2,682 passengers daily (boarding passengers only). ef>

== Surrounding area ==
- Nirasaka City Hall
- Nirasaka Elementary School
- Nirasaka High School

== See also ==
- List of railway stations in Japan
