= Enzan Station =

Railway station in Kōshū, Yamanashi Prefecture, Japan

CO37 Enzan Station 塩山駅
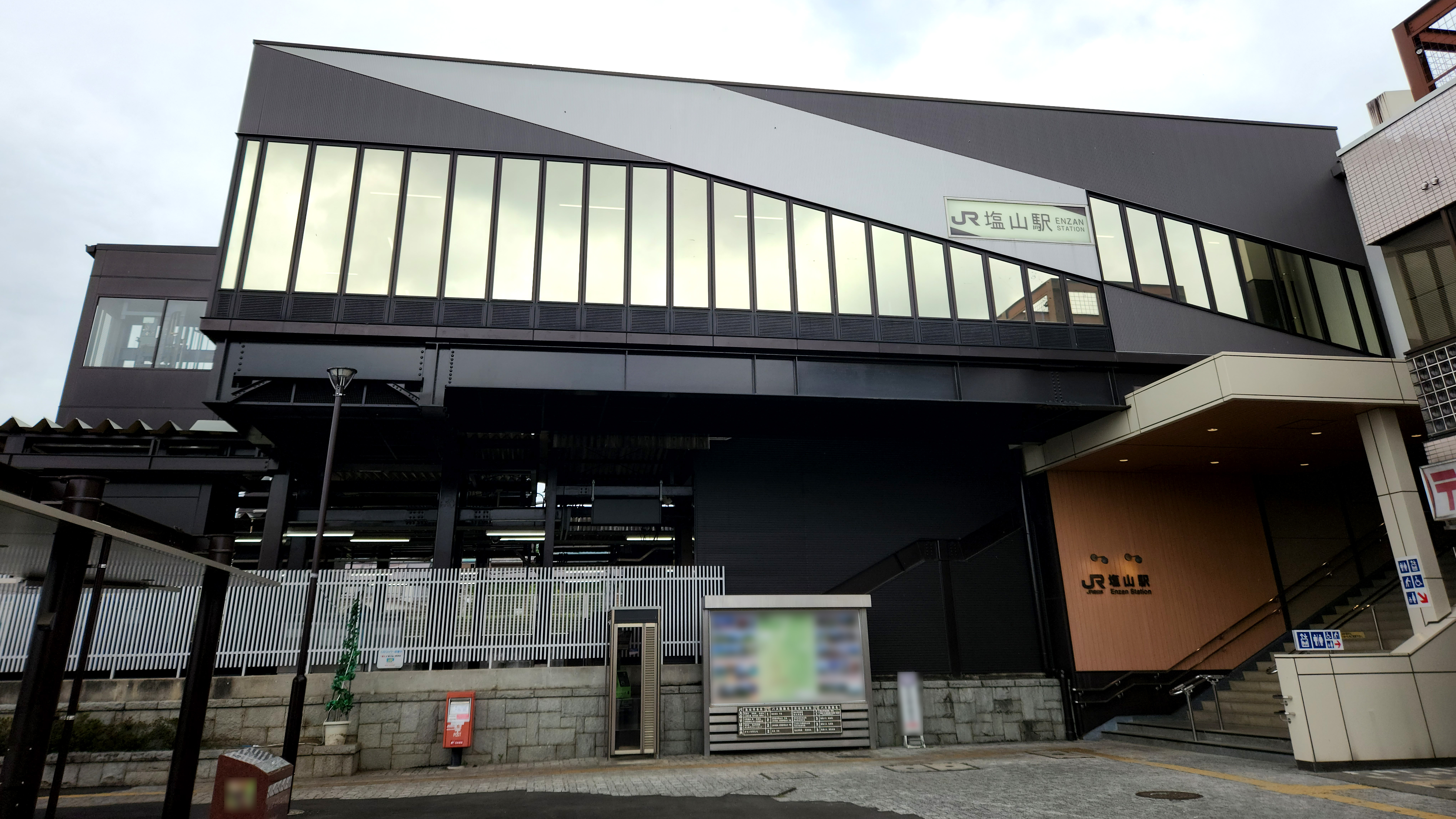
- South Exit of the station in August 2022

General information
- Location: 1720, Enzan-Kamiozo, Kōshū-shi, Yamanashi-ken; Japan
- Coordinates: 35°42′19″N 138°44′04″E
- Operator: JR East
- Line: ■ Chūō Main Line
- Distance: 116.9 km from Tokyo
- Platforms: 1 side + 1 island platform
- Tracks: 3

Other information
- Status: Staffed (Midori no Madoguchi )
- Website: Official website

History
- Opened: 11 June 1903; 123 years ago

Passengers
- FY2024: 3,196 (daily) ▲0.5%

Services
Preceding station	JR East	Following station
Yamanashishi CO39 towards Hakuba	Azusa	Ōtsuki JC32 towards Chiba or Tokyo
Yamanashishi CO39 towards Ryūō	Kaiji	Ōtsuki JC32 towards Tokyo
Higashi-Yamanashi CO38 towards Shiojiri	Chūō Main Line Local	Katsunuma-budōkyō CO36 towards Tachikawa
Location
- Location within Yamanashi Prefecture Location within Japan

Enzan Station (塩山駅, Enzan-eki) is a railway station of the Chūō Main Line, East Japan Railway Company (JR East) in Enzan-Kamioso, in the city of Kōshū, Yamanashi Prefecture, Japan.

== Lines ==
Enzan Station is served by the Chūō Main Line, and is 116.9 kilometers from the terminus of the line at Tokyo Station.

== Station layout ==
The station consists of one ground level side platform and one ground level island platform, connected to the station building by a footbridge. The station has a Midori no Madoguchi staffed ticket office.

=== Platforms ===
1	■ Chūō Main Line	for Kōfu, Nirasaki, Kobuchizawa and Matsumoto
2, 3	■ Chūō Main Line	for Ōtsuki, Takao, Hachiōji and Tachikawa

== History ==
Enzan Station was opened on 11 June 1903 as part of the Japanese Government Railways (JGR) Chūō Main Line from Hajikano to Kōfu. The JGR became the JNR (Japanese National Railways) after the end of World War II. With the dissolution and privatization of the JNR on April 1, 1987, the station came under the control of the East Japan Railway Company. Automated turnstiles using the Suica IC Card system came into operation from October 16, 2004.

== Passenger statistics ==
In fiscal 2017, the station was used by an average of 2086 passengers daily (boarding passengers only).

== Surrounding area ==
- former Katsunuma city hall

== See also ==
- List of railway stations in Japan
