= Kōzō-ji =

Kōzō-ji may refer to:

- Kōzō-ji (Kakuda), a Buddhist temple in Kakuda, Miyagi Prefecture, Japan
- Kōzō-ji (Kisarazu, Chiba), a Buddhist temple in Kisarazu, Chiba Prefecture, Japan
