= Kisarazu =

Kisarazu 木更津市
- City
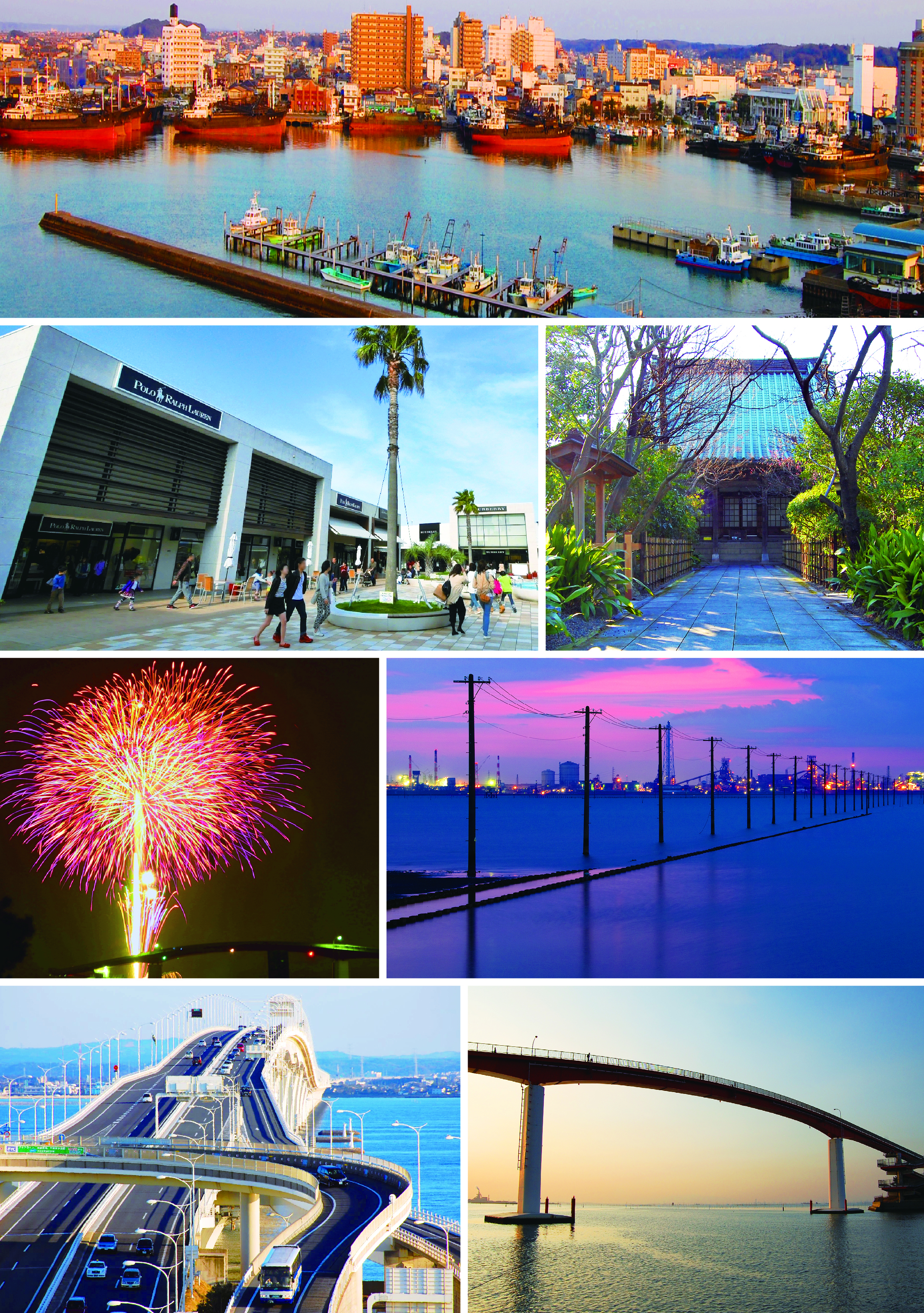
Kisarazu Port
Mitsui Outlet mall	Shōjo-ji
Fireworks at Kisarazu Port	Egawa Coast
View from Umihotaru PA	Nakanoshima Ohashi
- Flag Seal

- Location of Kisarazu in Chiba Prefecture

- Coordinates: 35°22′33.5″N 139°55′0.6″E
- Country: Japan
- Region: Kantō
- Prefecture: Chiba

Government
  - Mayor: Yoshikuni Watanabe

Area
  - Total: 138.95 km^{2} (53.65 sq mi)

Population (December 2020)
  - Total: 136,023
  - Density: 978.93/km^{2} (2,535.4/sq mi)
- Time zone: UTC+9 (Japan Standard Time)
- Phone number: 0438-23-7111
- Address: 1-1 Shiomi, Kisarazu-shi, Chiba-ken 292-8501
- Climate: Cfa
- Website: Official website
- Symbols
- Flower: Satsuki azalea
- Tree: Camellia

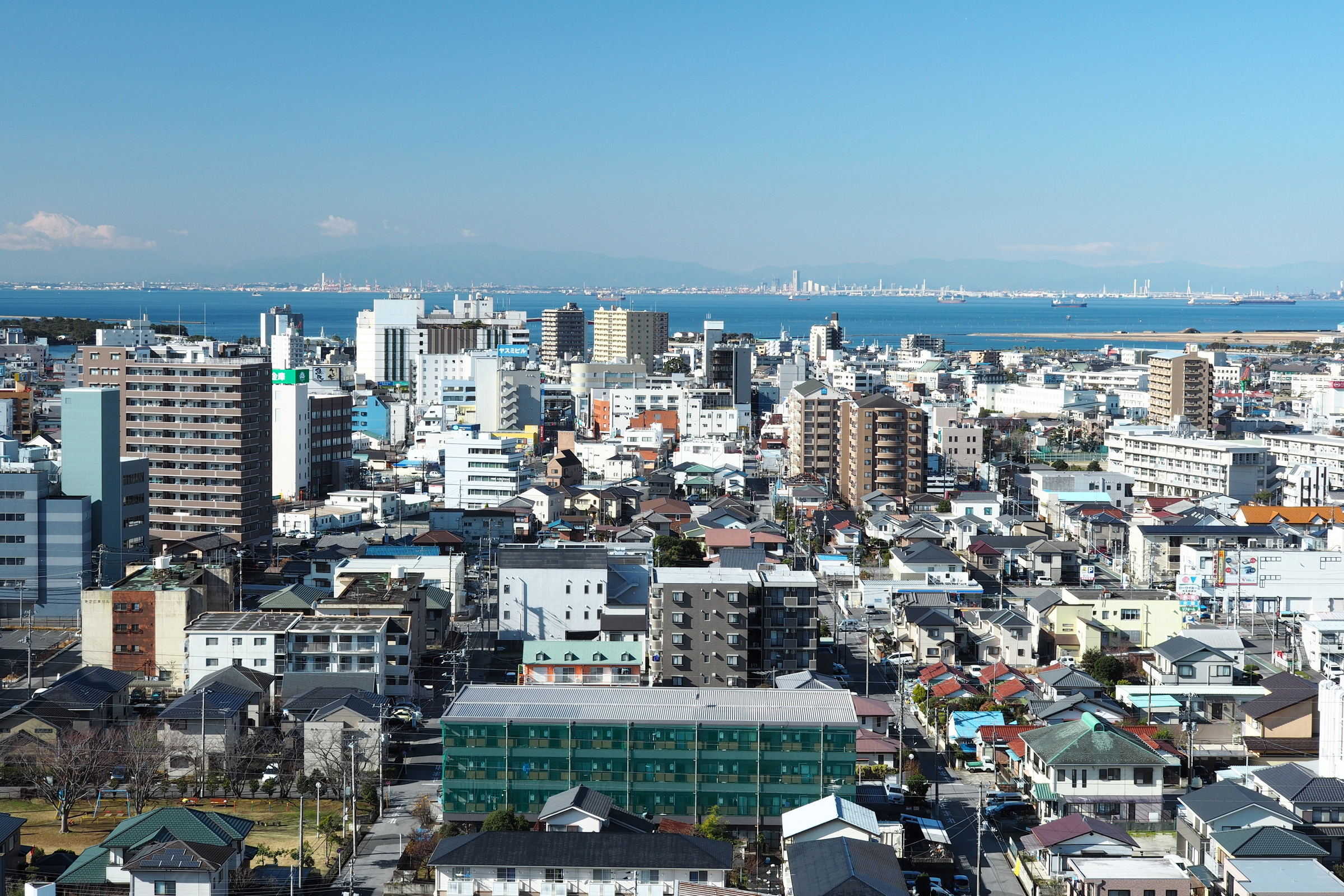
Kisarazu

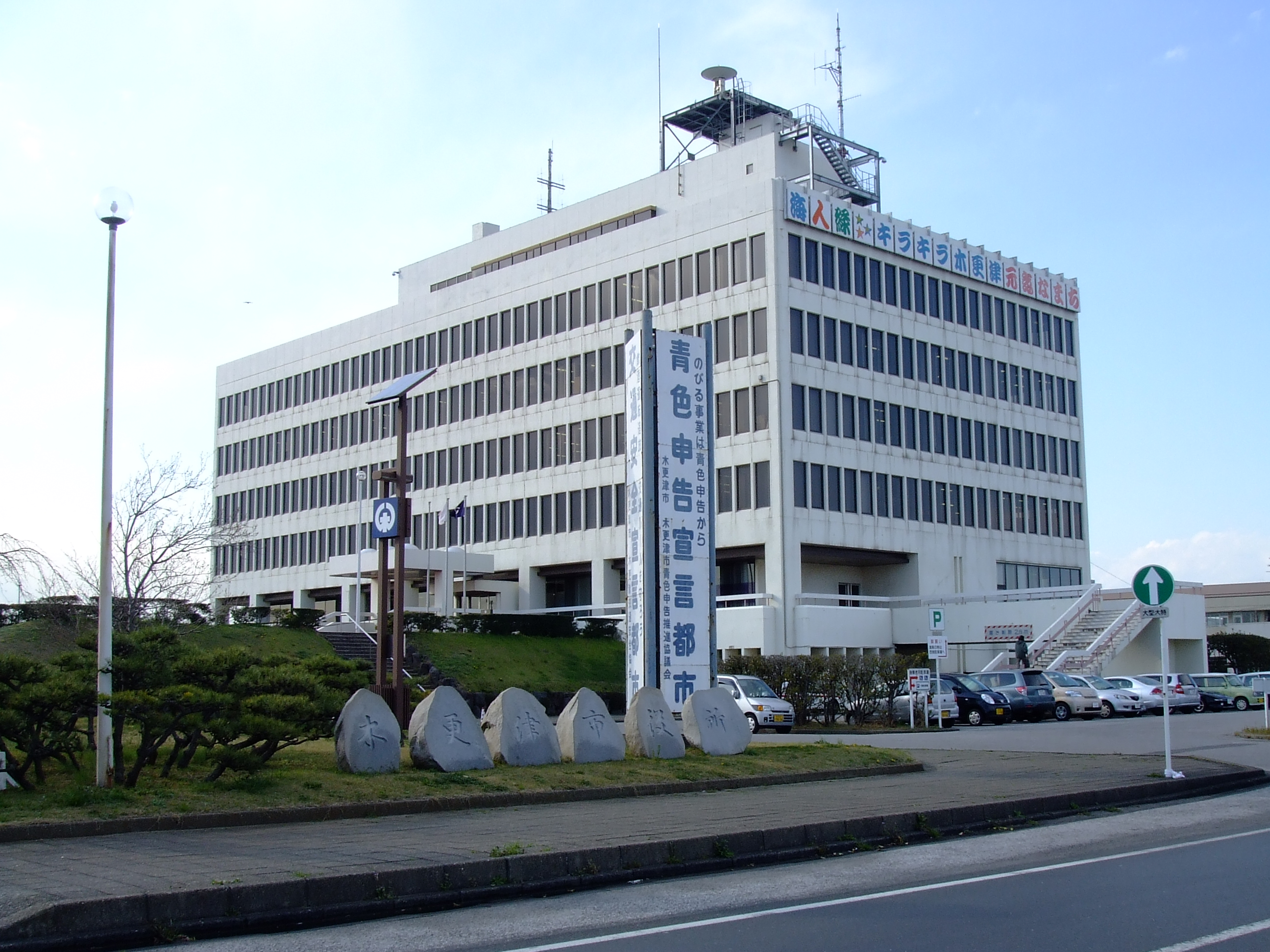
Kisarazu City Hall

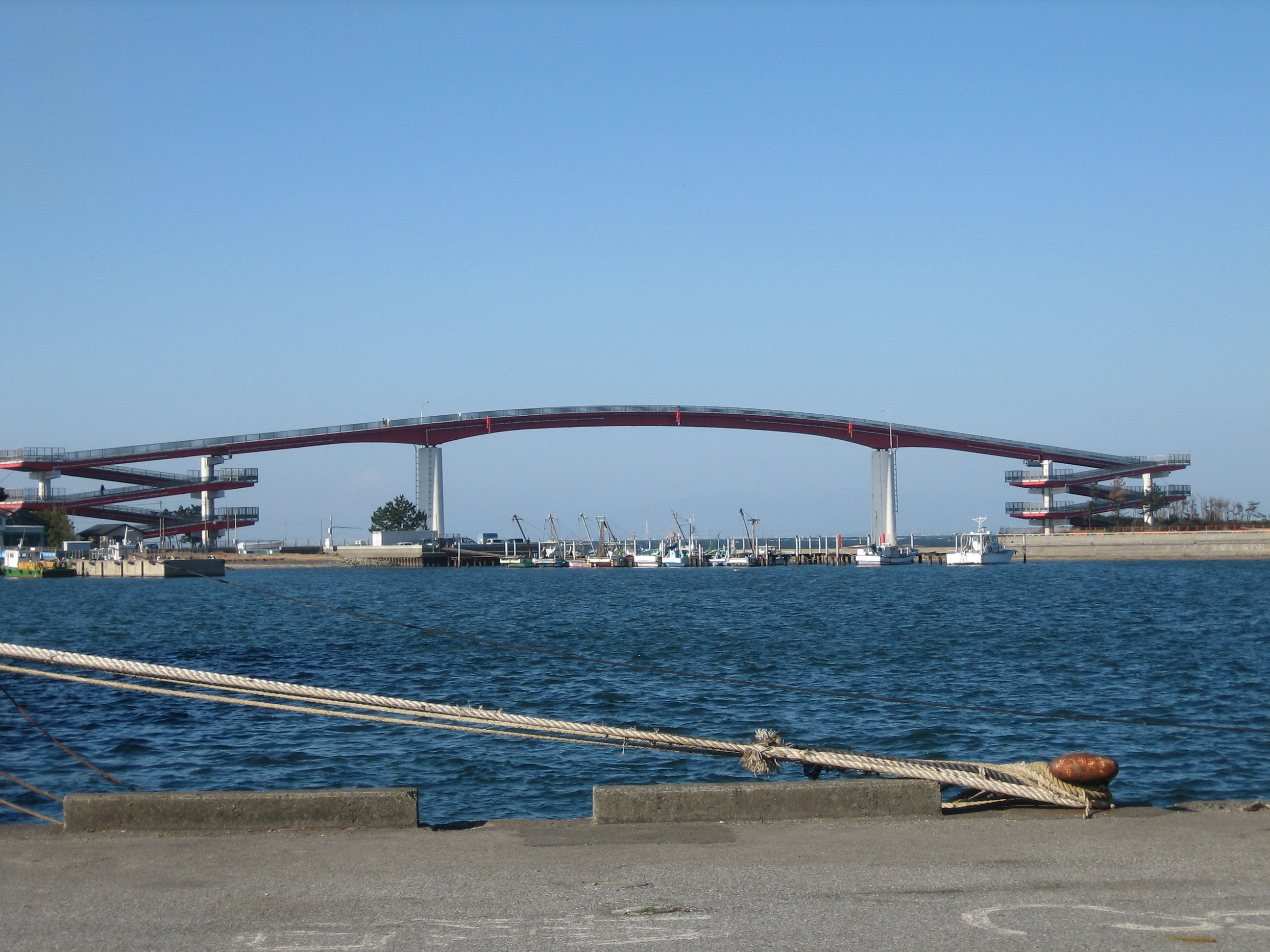
Nakanoshima Bridge

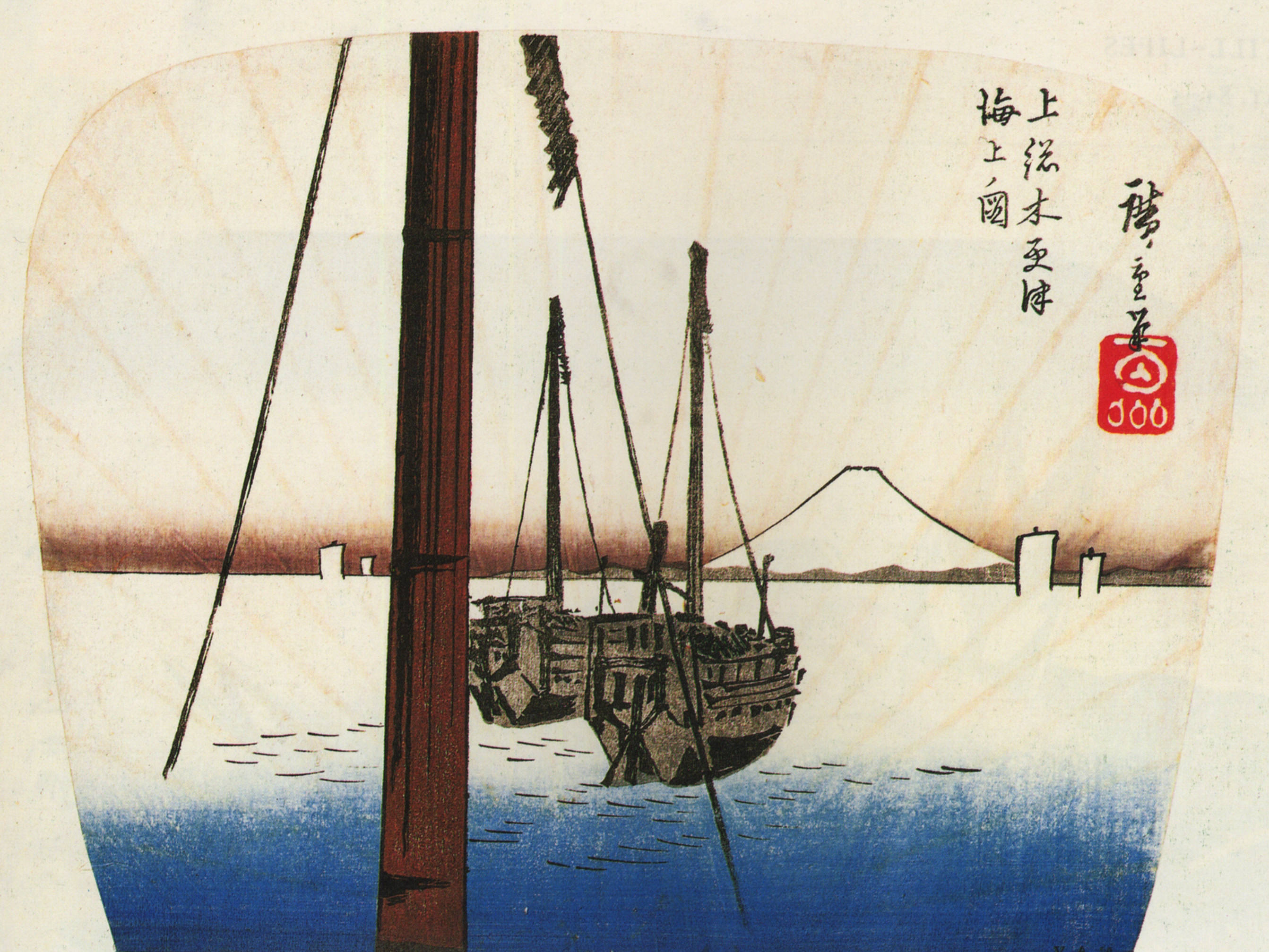
This ukiyo-e by Hiroshige shows Mount Fuji across Edo Bay from Kisarazu.

Kisarazu (木更津市, Kisarazu-shi) is a city located in Chiba Prefecture, Japan. As of 1 December 2020, the city had an estimated population of 136,023 in 63,431 households and a population density of 980 persons per km^{2}. The total area of the city is 138.95 square kilometres (53.65 sq mi).

== Geography ==
Kisarazu is located in the midwestern part of the Bōsō Peninsula, approximately 30 kilometers southwest of the prefectural capital at Chiba and 70 to 80 kilometers from central Tokyo. The Tokyo Bay Aqua-Line, a bridge-tunnel across Tokyo Bay, connects Kisarazu and the cities of Kawasaki and Yokohama in Kanagawa Prefecture, shortening the road distance to central Tokyo to 30 to 40 kilometers.

The city area extends from east to west, and the western part of the city is the flat land of the Kanto Plain, and the eastern part is the plateau of the Kisarazu Plateau and the Boso Hill Range. The Tokyo Bay coastal area is an industrial landfill from the south coast of Kisarazu Port to the direction of Kimitsu. The city's main river is the Obitsu River, which is the second longest river in the prefecture after the Tone River and has a total length of 88 kilometers. There are no particularly high mountains in the city, and even the highest point is about 200 meters above sea level.

=== Neighboring municipalities ===
Chiba Prefecture

- Ichihara
- Kimitsu
- Sodegaura

=== Climate ===
Kisarazu has a humid subtropical climate (Köppen Cfa) characterized by warm summers and cool winters with light to no snowfall. The average annual temperature in Kisarazu is 15.8 °C (60.4 °F). The average annual rainfall is 1,650.7 mm (64.99 in) with October as the wettest month. The temperatures are highest on average in August, at around 26.8 °C (80.2 °F), and lowest in January, at around 5.6 °C (42.1 °F).

Climate data for Kisarazu (2006−2020 normals, extremes 2006−present)
Month	Jan	Feb	Mar	Apr	May	Jun	Jul	Aug	Sep	Oct	Nov	Dec	Year
Record high °C (°F)	19.3 (66.7)	23.3 (73.9)	24.4 (75.9)	26.0 (78.8)	32.7 (90.9)	34.7 (94.5)	36.1 (97.0)	37.6 (99.7)	35.3 (95.5)	31.6 (88.9)	26.4 (79.5)	23.0 (73.4)	37.6 (99.7)
Mean daily maximum °C (°F)	9.6 (49.3)	10.4 (50.7)	14.0 (57.2)	18.6 (65.5)	23.5 (74.3)	25.7 (78.3)	29.6 (85.3)	31.3 (88.3)	27.5 (81.5)	21.9 (71.4)	16.8 (62.2)	12.1 (53.8)	20.1 (68.1)
Daily mean °C (°F)	5.6 (42.1)	6.2 (43.2)	9.5 (49.1)	13.8 (56.8)	18.6 (65.5)	21.4 (70.5)	25.3 (77.5)	26.8 (80.2)	23.2 (73.8)	18.0 (64.4)	12.8 (55.0)	8.1 (46.6)	15.8 (60.4)
Mean daily minimum °C (°F)	1.6 (34.9)	2.2 (36.0)	5.3 (41.5)	9.5 (49.1)	14.6 (58.3)	18.1 (64.6)	22.3 (72.1)	23.7 (74.7)	20.1 (68.2)	14.8 (58.6)	9.0 (48.2)	4.1 (39.4)	12.1 (53.8)
Record low °C (°F)	−5.4 (22.3)	−3.8 (25.2)	−1.2 (29.8)	0.7 (33.3)	8.0 (46.4)	10.2 (50.4)	15.1 (59.2)	16.8 (62.2)	12.1 (53.8)	7.8 (46.0)	0.4 (32.7)	−2.2 (28.0)	−5.4 (22.3)
Average precipitation mm (inches)	66.2 (2.61)	82.0 (3.23)	134.0 (5.28)	133.5 (5.26)	140.9 (5.55)	181.7 (7.15)	138.0 (5.43)	97.2 (3.83)	229.2 (9.02)	261.7 (10.30)	111.7 (4.40)	93.6 (3.69)	1,650.7 (64.99)
Average precipitation days (≥ 1.0 mm)	4.9	7.4	10.0	9.3	9.0	11.4	9.8	7.4	12.1	11.5	9.5	6.5	108.8
Mean monthly sunshine hours	185.5	149.5	174.5	177.7	197.5	135.0	165.2	207.1	132.8	124.4	139.1	169.3	1,960.2
Source: Japan Meteorological Agency

== Demographics ==
Per Japanese census data, the population of Kisarazu has increased substantially over the past 70 years.

Historical population
Year	Pop.	±%
1950	58,065	—
1960	59,965	+3.3%
1970	79,956	+33.3%
1980	110,711	+38.5%
1990	123,433	+11.5%
2000	122,768	−0.5%
2010	129,312	+5.3%
2020	136,166	+5.3%

== History ==
=== Early history ===
The area of modern Kisarazu has been inhabited since the Japanese Paleolithic period, and numerous remains from the Jōmon, Yayoi and Kofun periods have been found within the city limits. The area also is prominent in the Yamatotakeru mythology. Under the Ritsuryō system of the Nara period, the area became part of Kazusa Province. The area was contested between the Later Hōjō clan, Takeda clan and Satomi clan during the Sengoku period. During the Edo period under the Tokugawa shogunate, part of the area was under the control of the feudal domain of Jōzai, with large portions as tenryō territory controlled directly by the Shogunate and administered by numerous hatamoto.

=== Meiji Restoration and Kisarazu Prefecture ===
Kisarazu was part of the complex reconfiguration of administrative areas at the start of the Meiji period. In 1871, as part of the abolition of the han system, the Sakurai Domain, located partly in Kisarazu, was abolished and "Sakurai Prefecture" was established.

In November of the same year, the prefecture was combined with the former Awa Province and Kazusa Province to form "Kisarazu Prefecture". The prefectural seat was established in the present-day Kaifuchi district of Kisarazu. Kisarazu Prefecture was established two years later in 1873. It was combined with Inba Prefecture to form present-day Chiba Prefecture. Kisarazu Town, founded on April 1, 1889, with the creation of the modern municipalities system.

=== World War II and post-war period ===
Kisarazu was developed as a center for military activity as part of the militarization of Japan in the 1930s. In 1935-1936 the Imperial Japanese Navy, established the Kisarazu Air Field for the Kisarazu Air Group on landfill in the northern part of Kisarazu to protect Tokyo from attack. The base served as an arsenal, and employed up to 17,000 workers during the war. It was this site that received the remains of Admiral Isoroku Yamamoto after being transported back to Japan aboard Japanese battleship Musashi. The Nakajima Kikka, Japan's first jet-powered aircraft, was tested at the base in 1945. The base was used by the United States Air Force from 1945 as "Kisarazu Air Base". In 1956, the base was officially transferred to the control of the Japan Air Self-Defense Force (JASDF).

On November 3, 1942. Kisarazu Town, Iwane Village, Kiyokawa Village, and Namioka Village marged to form Kisarazu City. Kisarazu was expanded through merger with neighboring Aoyagi Town on March 31, 1955, and again through merger with Amaha Town and Osawa Town on April 25, 1971.

In 2025, Kisarazu was designated as an "Africa Hometown" by the Japan International Cooperation Agency as part of an exchange program between Japan and Nigeria, leading to public complaints. Coupled with the fact that the Kisarazu City Hall government building in front of the station has been renamed "Nigeria City Hall government building in front of the station" on Google Maps, concerns spread among Japanese people that an influx of immigrants from disorderly countries will lead to an increase in crime.

== Government ==
Kisarazu has a mayor-council form of government with a directly elected mayor and a unicameral city council of 24 members. Kisarazu contributes two members to the Chiba Prefectural Assembly. In terms of national politics, the city is part of Chiba 12th district of the lower house of the Diet of Japan.

== Economy ==
Kisarazu has a mixed economy based on commercial fishing, agriculture, and heavy industry along its Tokyo Bay shoreline. It serves as the commercial center for central Bōsō Peninsula, and is increasingly a bedroom community for neighboring Kimitsu and the Kawasaki – Yokohama metropolis across Tokyo Bay. The opening of the Tokyo Bay Aqua-Line has also resulted in the creation of a number of factory outlet shopping malls, and the development of new towns, and land prices increased dramatically in the 1980s through 2000s.

== Transportation ==
=== Railway ===
JR East – Uchibō Line

- Iwane - Kisarazu

JR East – Kururi Line

- Kisarazu - Gion - Kazusa-Kiyokawa -Higashi-Kiyokawa --- Makuta

=== Highway ===
- Tokyo Bay Aqua-Line
- Ken-Ō Expressway
- Tateyama Expressway
- National Route 16
- National Route 127
- National Route 409
- National Route 410

=== Air ===
The city does not have an airport. The nearest airports are:

- Haneda Airport, located 28 km (17 mi) north west which is easily accessible by crossing over the Tokyo Bay Aqua-Line.
- Narita International Airport, located 85 km (53 mi) north east of Kisarazu.

=== Seaports ===
- Port of Kisarazu

== Education ==
- Seiwa University
- Kisazaru has 18 public elementary schools and 12 public middle schools operated by the city government, and two public high schools operated by the Chiba Prefectural Board of Education. The city also has one private elementary school, two private middle schools, and four private high schools.

== Local attractions ==
- Enmyō-in - Buddhist temple
- Kōzō-ji - 30th temple in the Bandō Sanjūsankasho the circuit of 33 Buddhist temples in eastern Japan
- Nakanoshima Park (Kisarazu)

== Sister cities ==
- Bogor, West Java, Indonesia, since November 18, 2016
- Oceanside, California, United States, since June 29, 1990

== Notable people from Kisarazu ==
- Kaori Fukuhara, voice actress
- Miyuki Miura, karate master
- Akira Nakao, actor
- Haruo Oka, musician
- Hideki Takahashi, actor

== In popular culture ==
Kisarazu's profile has been raised in recent times by the popularity of the TV show and subsequent film, Kisarazu Cat's Eye, which were set and filmed in the city. Kisarazu is also featured in the movie, "Shin Gojira."<Toho>

== Gallery ==
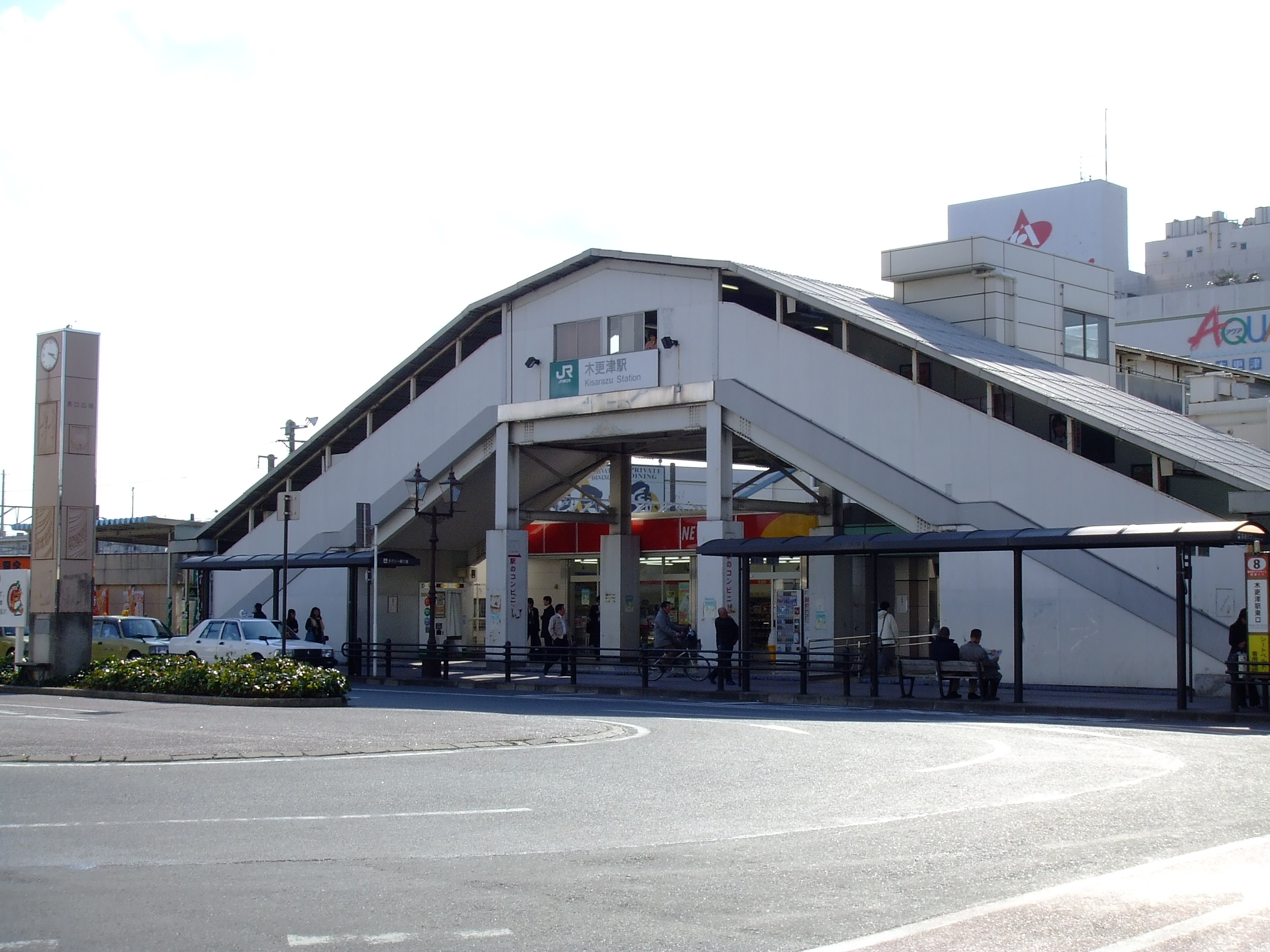
Kisarazu Station

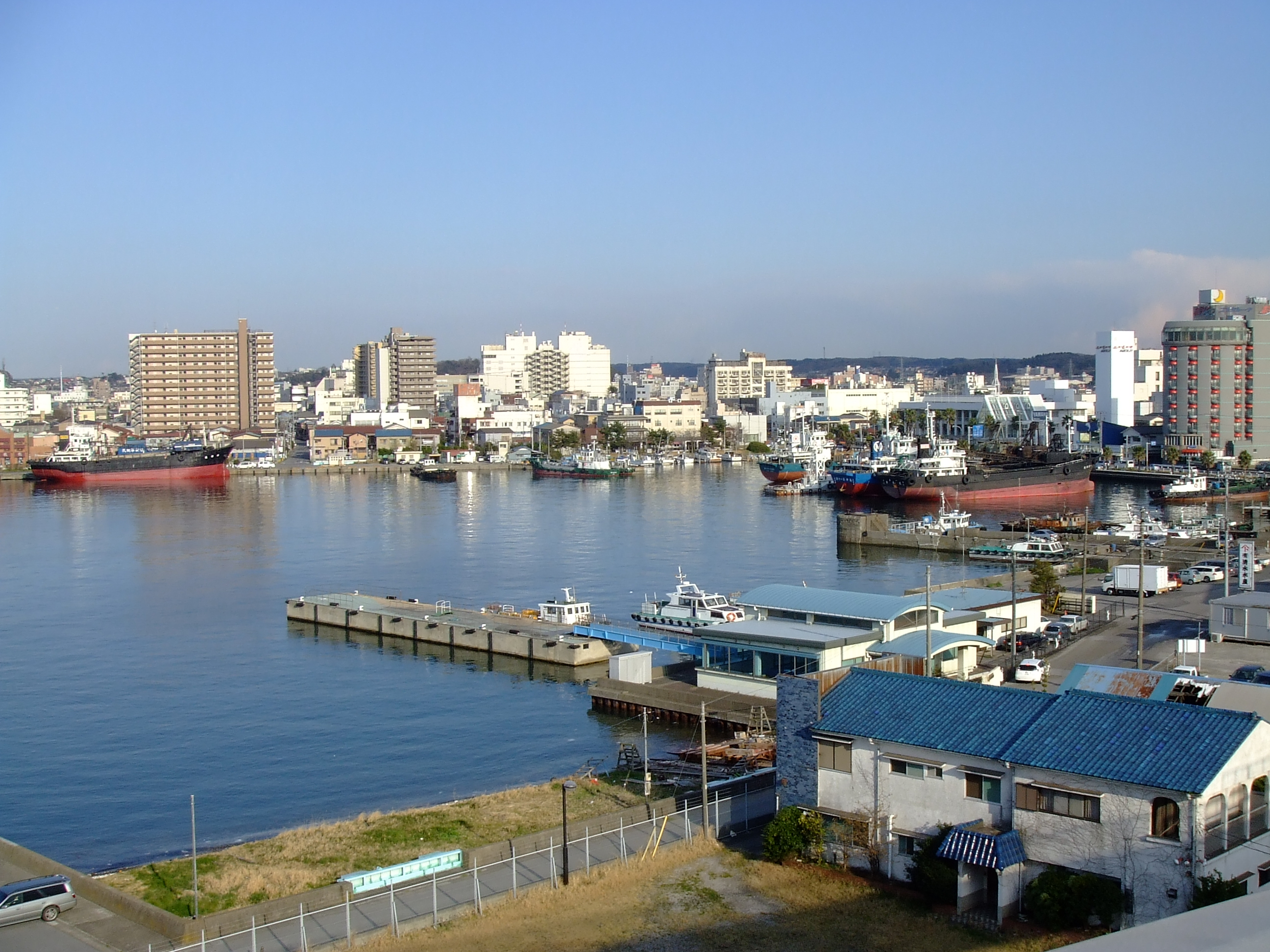
Port of Kisarazu

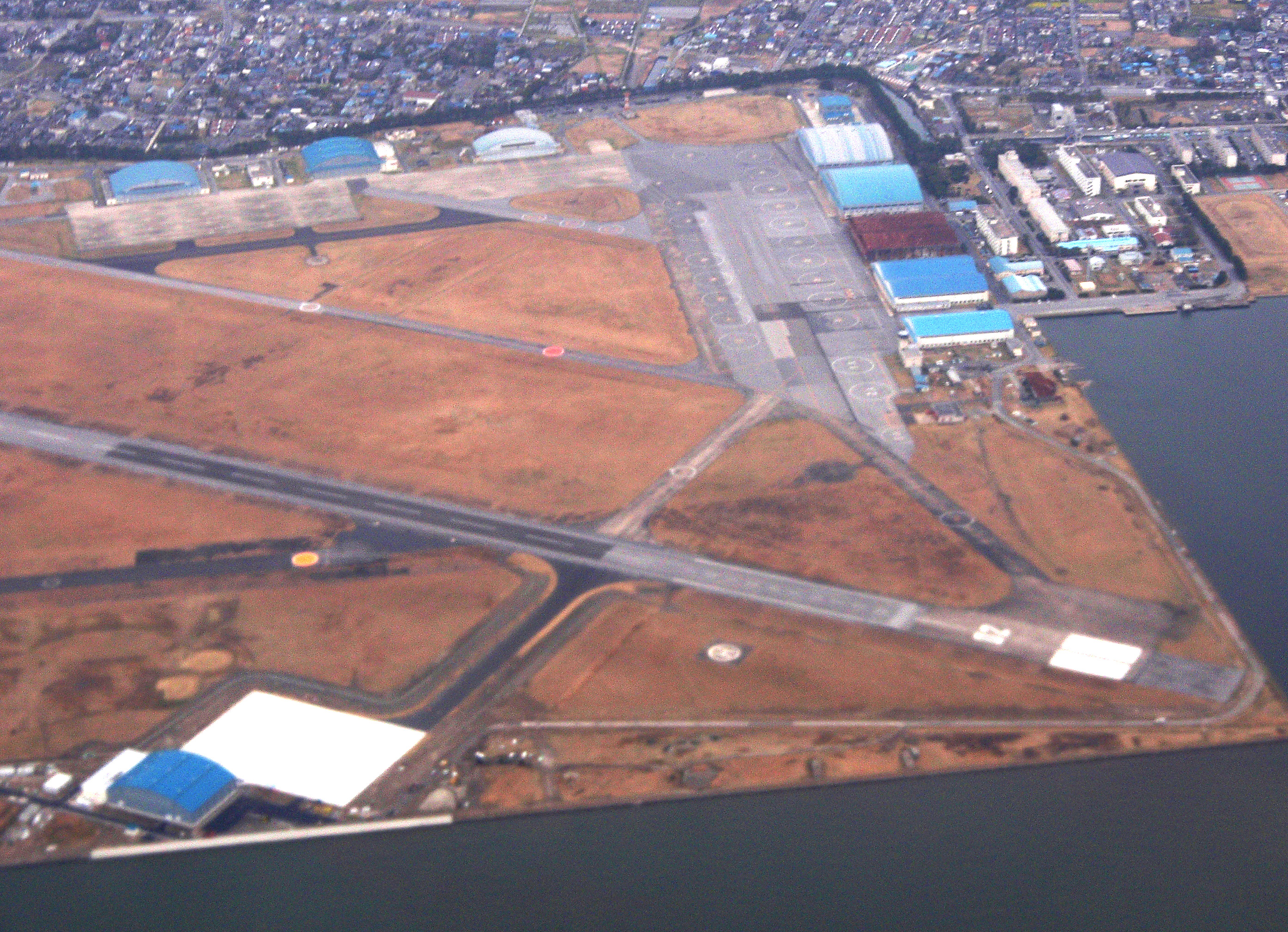
JGSDF Kisarazu Air Field

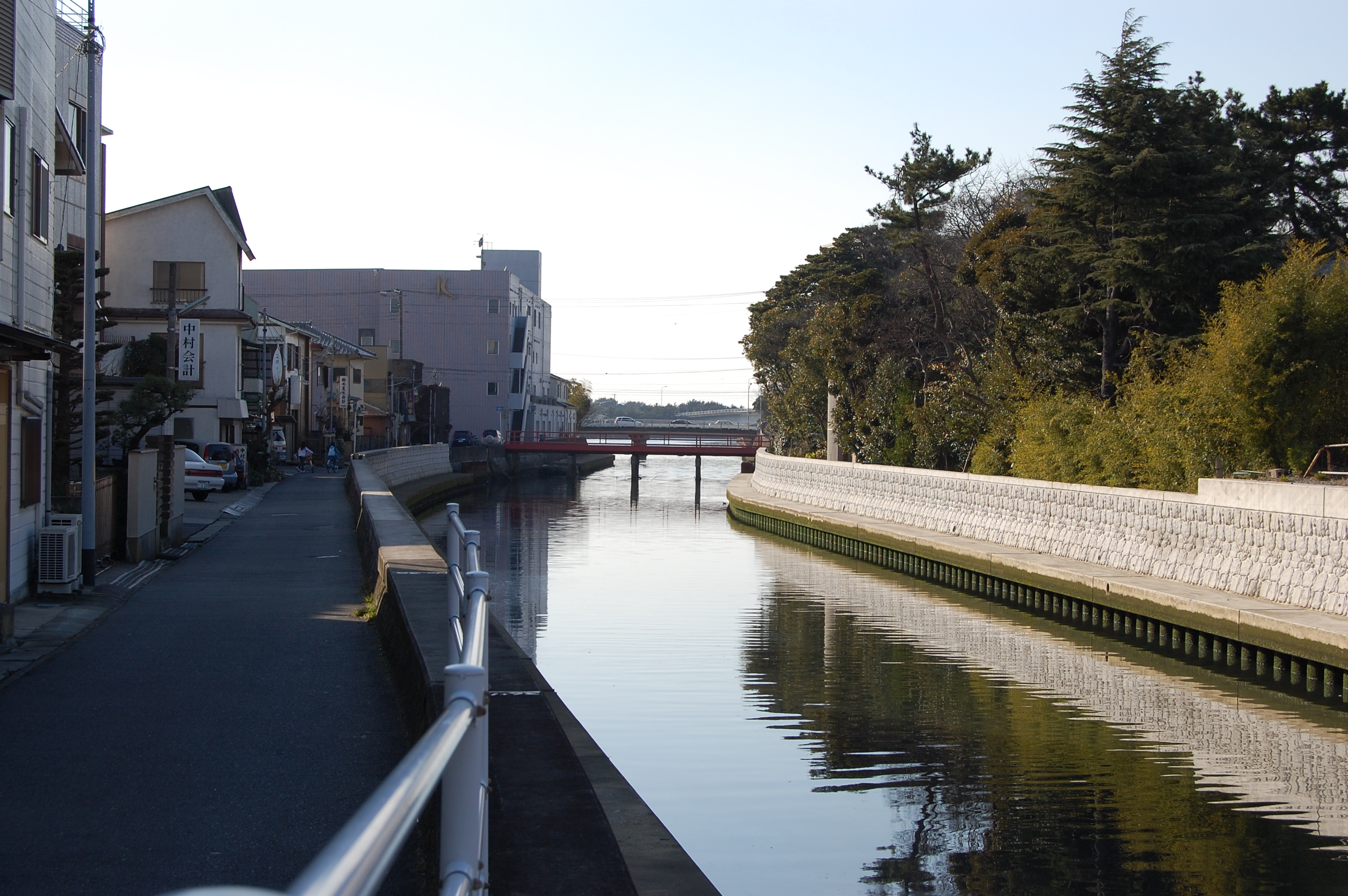
Yana River, Kisarazu

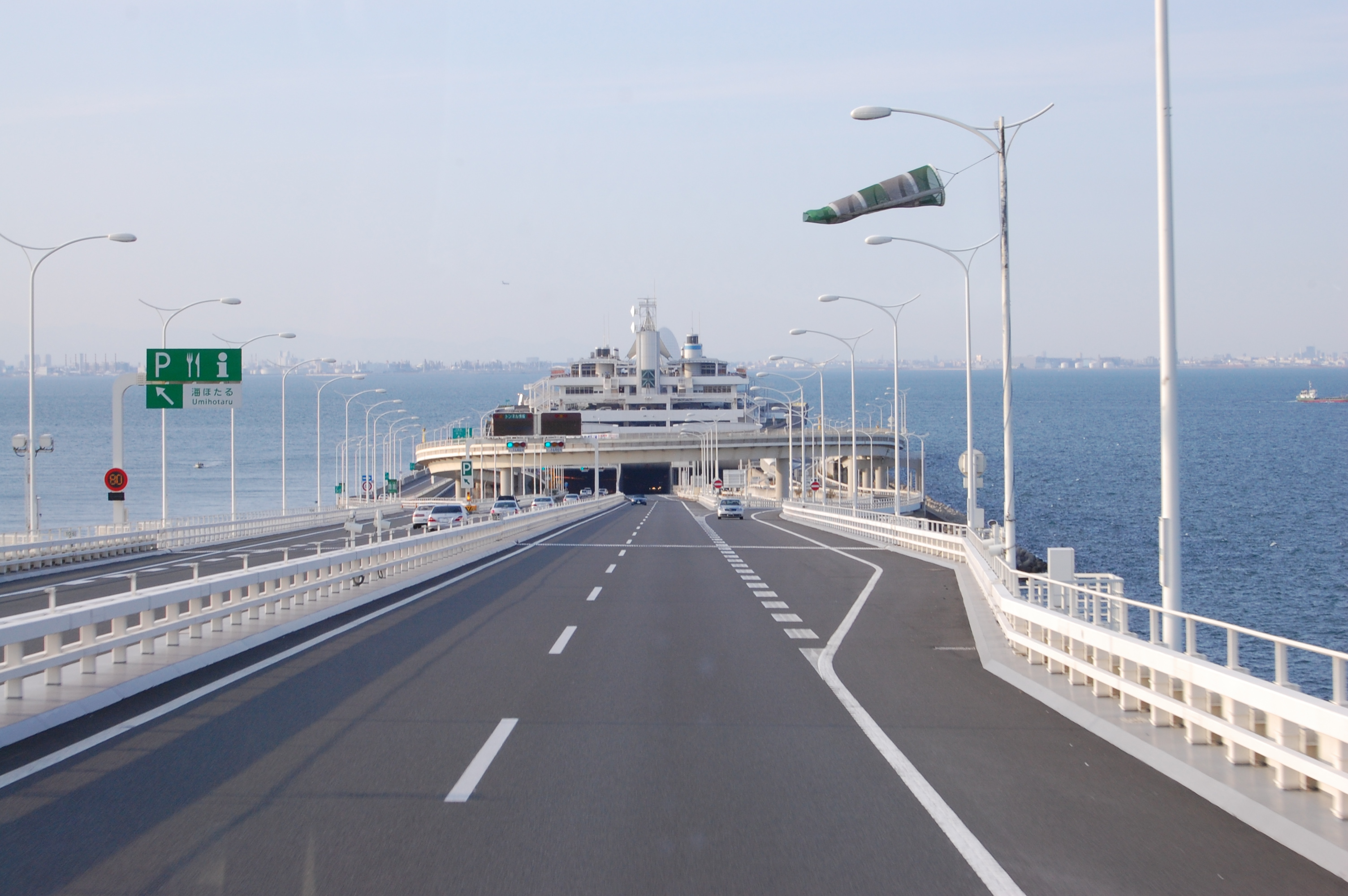
Umi-hotaru (Sea firefly) Parking Service area and Kisarazu

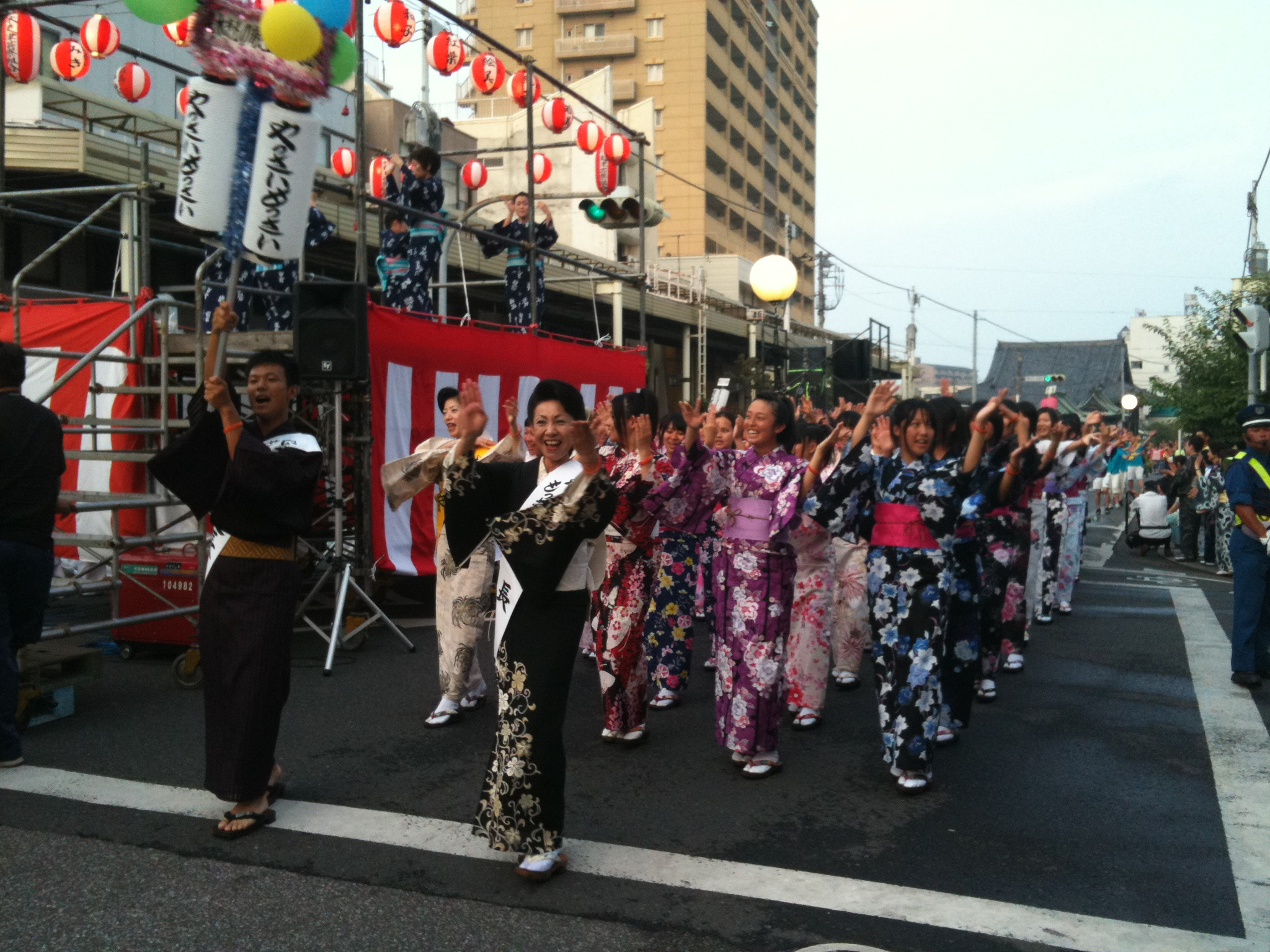
Yassai-Mossai (Sokonoke-Sokonoke) Dancing Event on August 14

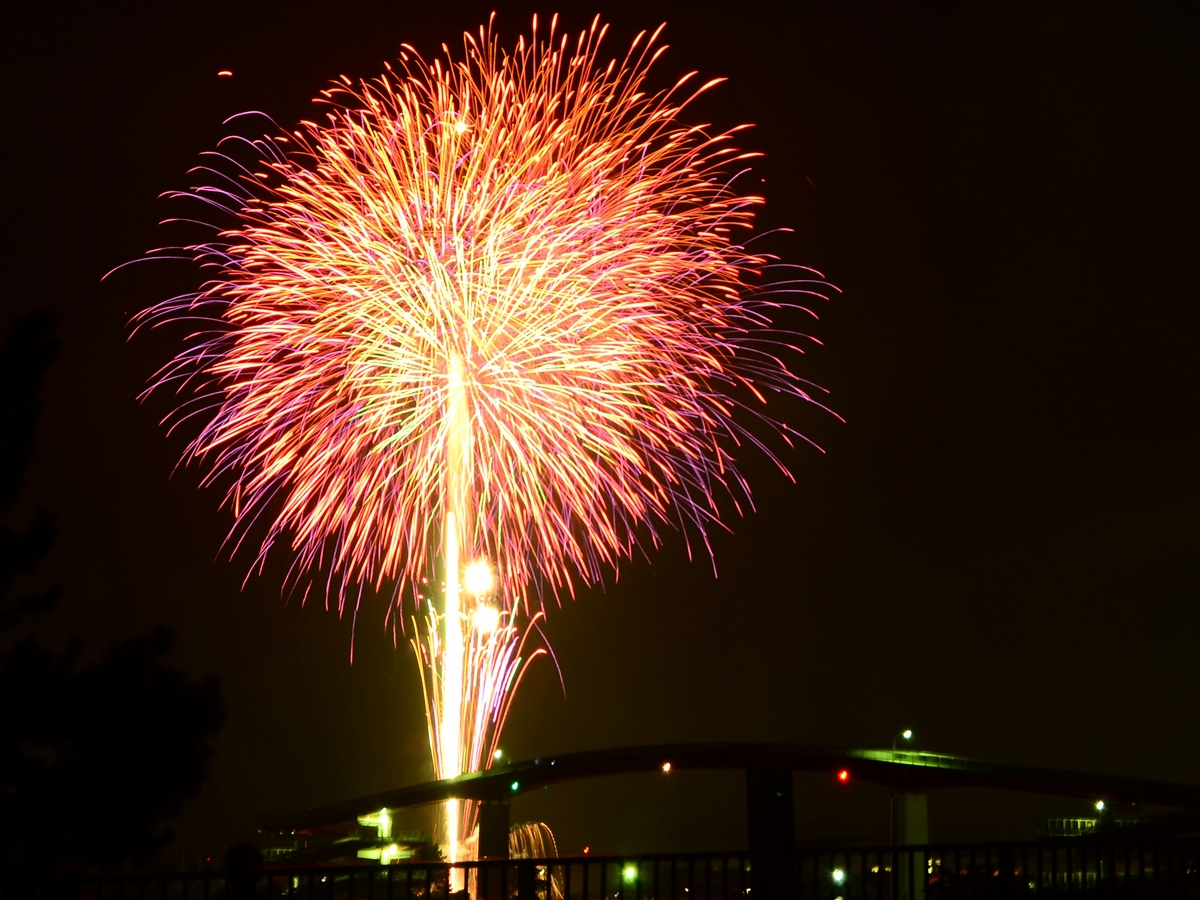
Kisarazu Port Festival (Minato-Matsuri) Fireworks Festival on August15
