= Gion Station =

Gion Station (祇園駅) is the name of two train stations in Japan:

- Gion Station (Fukuoka) on the Airport Line
- Gion Station (Chiba) on the Kururi Line
