= Port of Kisarazu =

Port of Kisarazu 木更津港
- Interactive map of Port of Kisarazu 木更津港

Location
- Country: Japan
- Location: Chiba Prefecture
- Coordinates: 35°22′58″N 139°54′58″E

Details
- Opened: 1968

The Port of Kisarazu is located in Chiba Prefecture, Japan. The port is located across the cities of Kisarazu, Kimitsu and Futtsu.
