= Kazusa-Kiyokawa Station =

Railway station in Kisarazu, Chiba Prefecture, Japan

Kazusa-Kiyokawa Station 上総清川駅
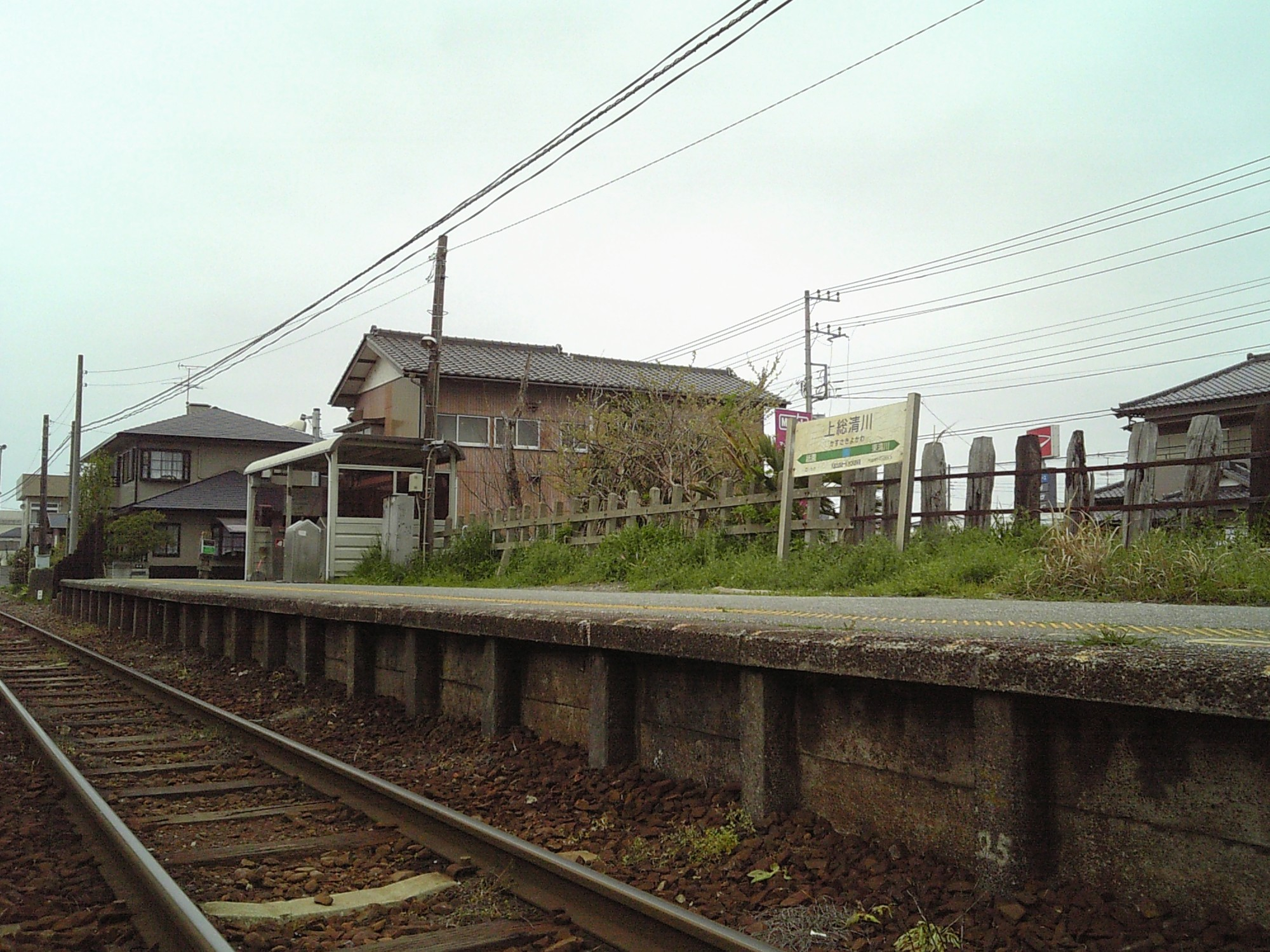
- Kazusa-Kiyokawa Station platform, April 2008

General information
- Location: Sugō 799, Kisarazu-shi, Chiba-ken 292-0051; Japan
- Coordinates: 35°23′27.73″N 139°57′56.29″E
- Operator: JR East
- Line: ■ Kururi Line
- Distance: 4.2 km from Kisarazu
- Platforms: 1 side platform

Other information
- Status: Unstaffed
- Website: Official website

History
- Opened: December 28, 1912
- Former names: Kiyokawa (until 1923)

Passengers
- FY2006: 254 daily

Services
Preceding station	JR East	Following station
Gion towards Kisarazu	Kururi Line	Higashi-Kiyokawa towards Kazusa-Kameyama
Location
- Location within Chiba Prefecture Location within Japan

Kazusa-Kiyokawa Station (上総清川駅, Kazusa-Kiyokawa-eki) is a passenger railway station in the city of Kimitsu, Chiba Prefecture, Japan, operated by the East Japan Railway Company (JR East).

== Lines ==
Kazusa-Kiyokawa Station is a station on the Kururi Line, and is located 4.2 km (2.6 mi) from the terminus of the line at Kisarazu Station.

== Station layout ==
The station consists of a single side platform serving bidirectional traffic. The platform is short, and can only handle trains with a length of five carriages or less. The station is unattended.

=== Platform ===
1	■ Kururi Line	Kisarazu; Kazusa-Kameyama

== History ==
Kazusa-Kiyokawa Station was opened on December 28, 1912, as Kiyokawa Station (清川駅, Kiyokawa-eki) on the Chiba Prefectural Railways Kururi Line. The line was nationalized into the Japanese Government Railways (JGR) on September 1, 1923, at which time the station name was changed to its present name. The JGR became the Japan National Railways (JNR) after World War II. The station was absorbed into the JR East network upon the privatization of the JNR on April 1, 1987. The original station building was destroyed in typhoon in 2004 and replaced with the current structure.

== Passenger statistics ==
In fiscal 2006, the station was used by an average of 254 passengers daily.

== Surrounding area ==
- National Route 409
- National Route 410
- Seiwa University

== See also ==
- List of railway stations in Japan
