= Higashi-Kiyokawa Station =

Railway station in Kisarazu, Chiba Prefecture, Japan

Higashi-Kiyokawa Station 東清川駅
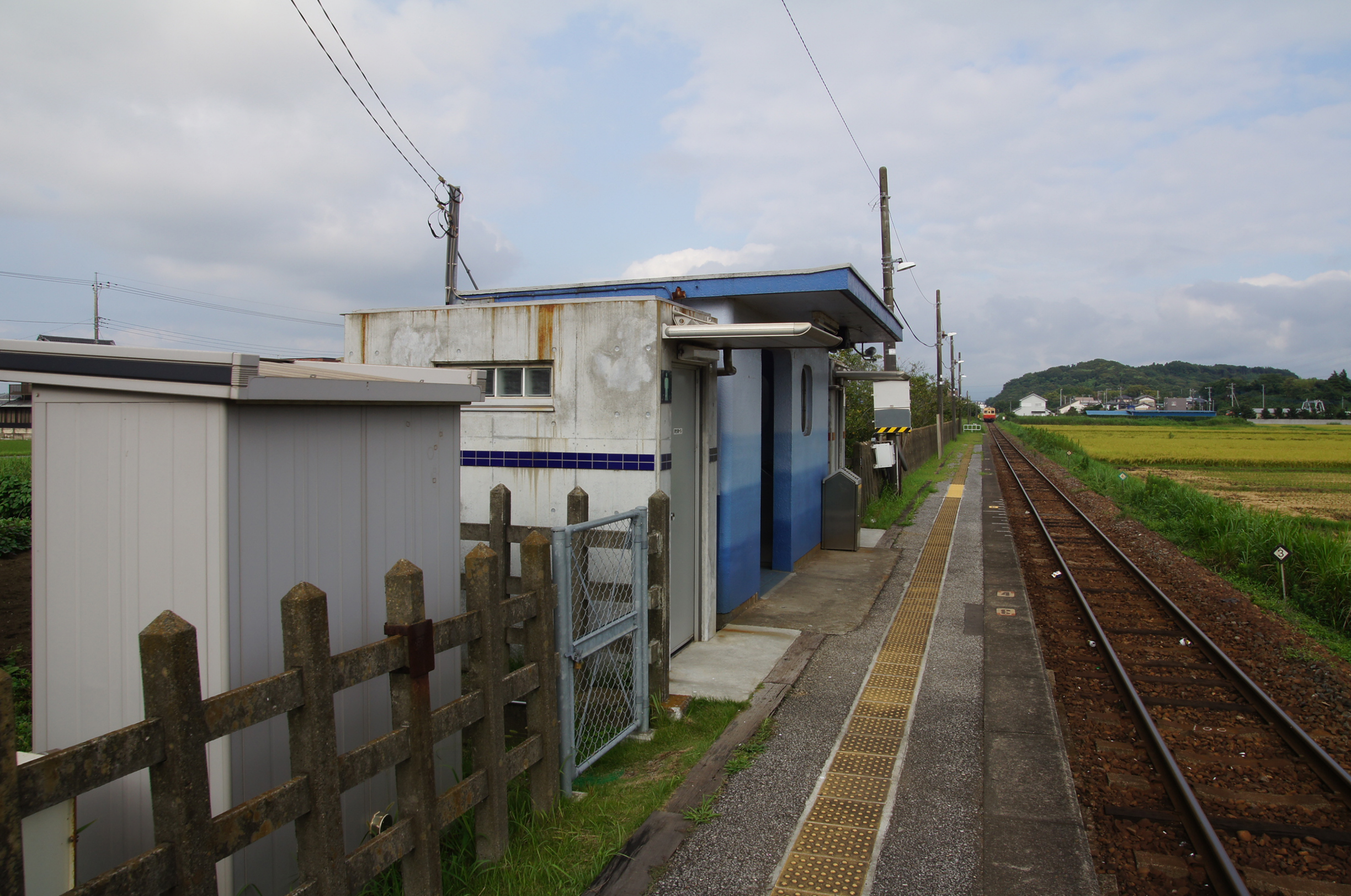
- Higashi-Kiyokawa Station in August 2011

General information
- Location: 486 Sasago, Kisarazu-shi, Chiba-ken 292-0032; Japan
- Coordinates: 35°23′24.16″N 139°59′08.73″E
- Operator: JR East
- Line: ■ Kururi Line
- Distance: 6.1 km from Kisarazu
- Platforms: 1 side platform
- Tracks: 1

Construction
- Parking: None
- Cycle facilities: Yes

Other information
- Status: Unstaffed
- Website: Official website

History
- Opened: 2 October 1978

Passengers
- FY2006: 86 daily

Services
Preceding station	JR East	Following station
Kazusa-Kiyokawa towards Kisarazu	Kururi Line	Yokota towards Kazusa-Kameyama
Location
- Location within Chiba Prefecture Location within Japan

Higashi-Kiyokawa Station (東清川駅, Higashi-Kiyokawa-eki) is a passenger railway station in the city of Kisarazu, Chiba Prefecture, Japan, operated by the East Japan Railway Company (JR East).

== Lines ==
Higashi-Kiyokawa Station is served by the 32.2 km Kururi Line from Kisarazu to Kazusa-Kameyama, and lies 6.1 kilometers from the starting point of the line at Kisarazu.

== Station layout ==
The station consists of one side platform serving a single bidirectional track. The station is unattended.

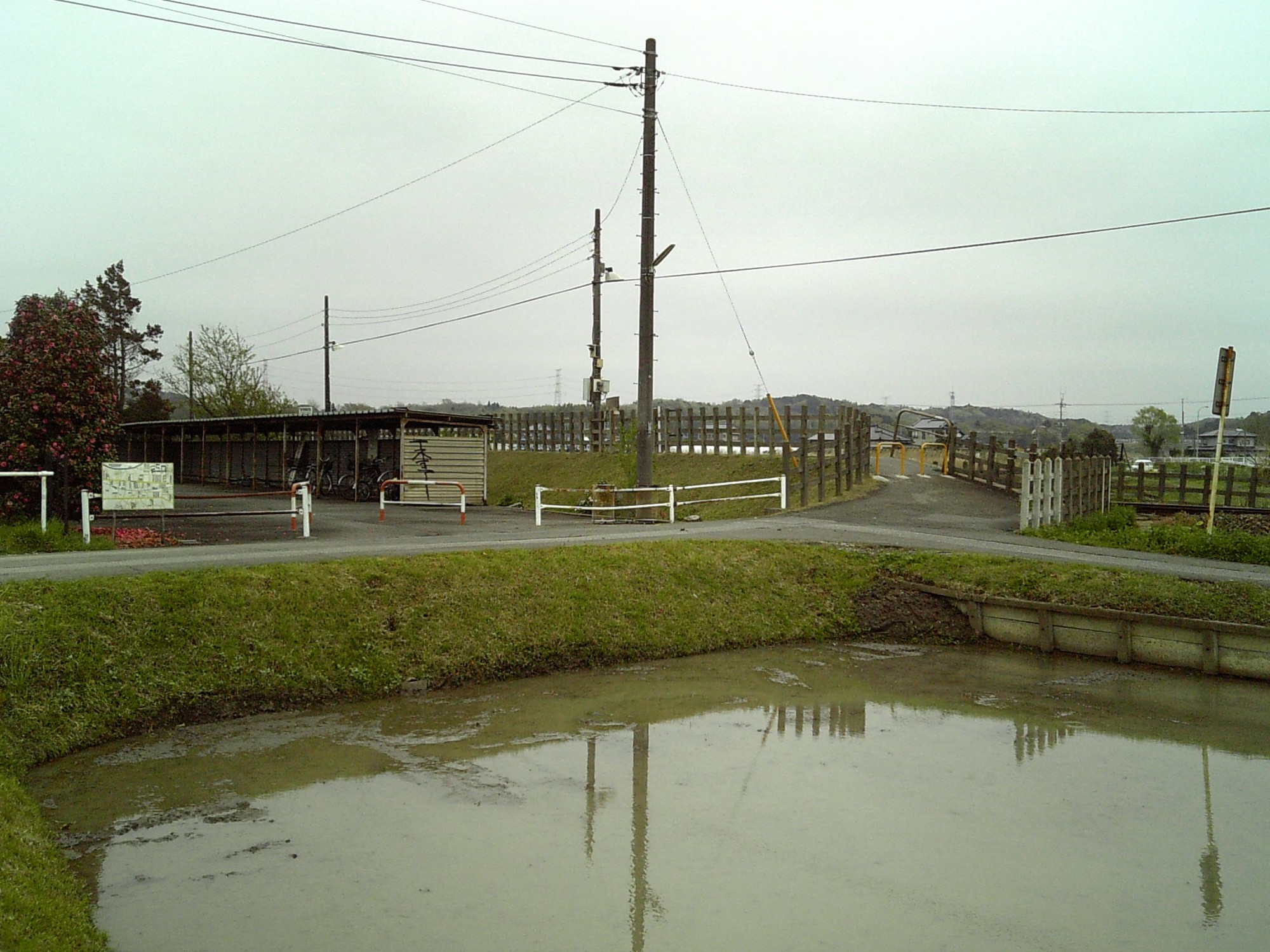
The entrance directly to the platform in April 2008

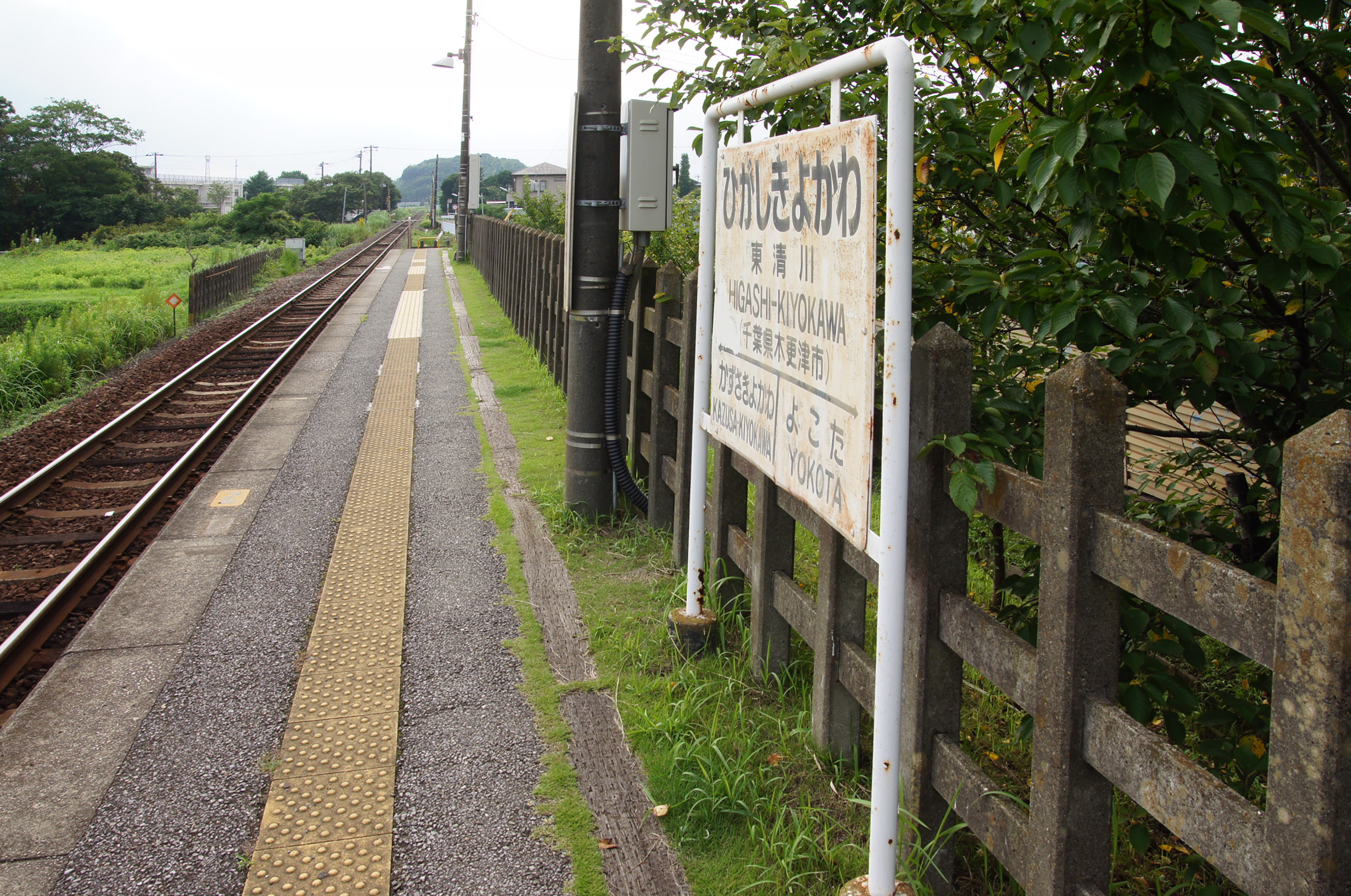
The platform looking west in August 2011

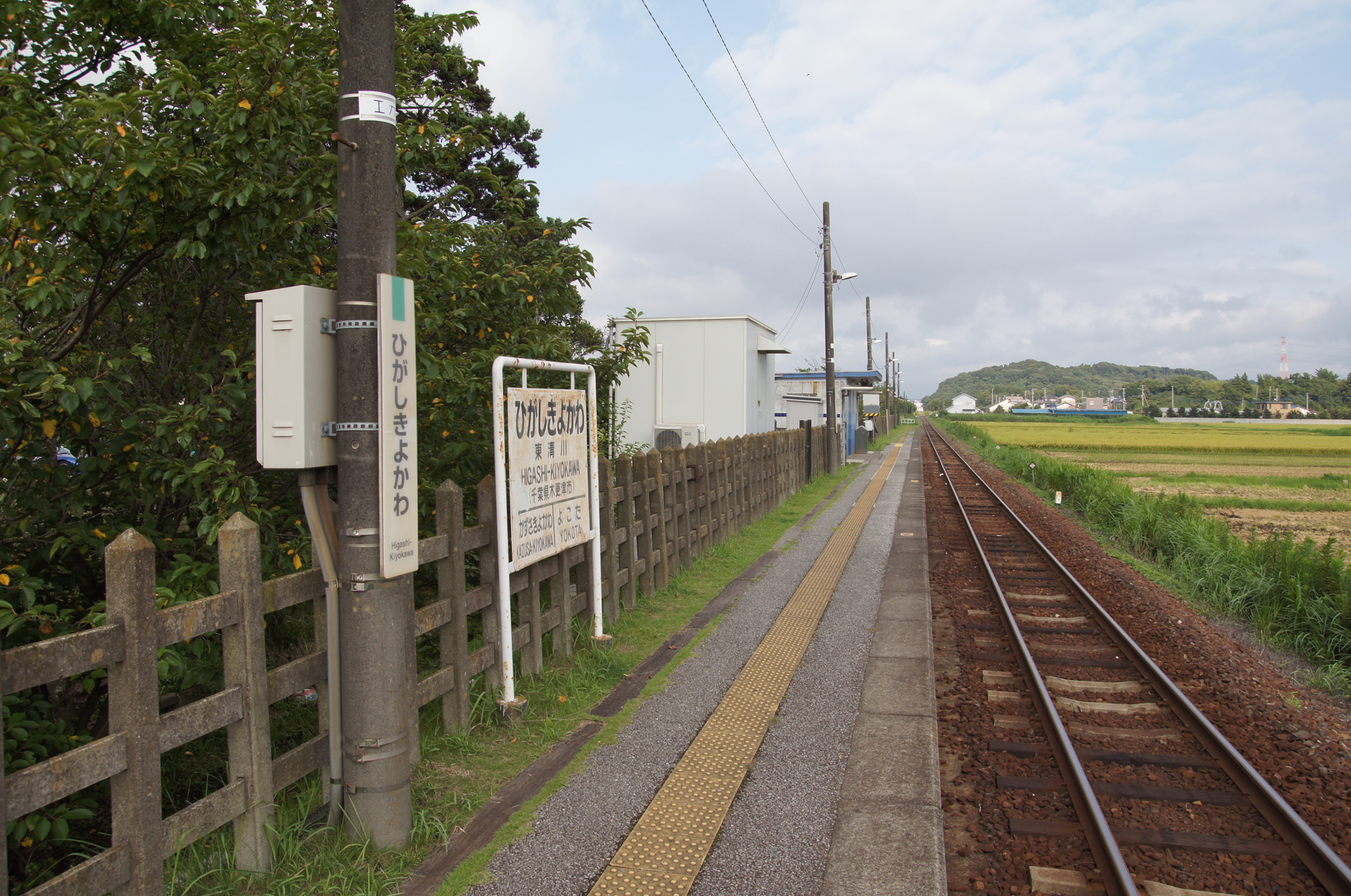
The platform looking east in August 2011

== History ==
The station opened on October 2, 1978, as a temporary stop on the Japanese National Railways (JNR) Kururi Line. It was absorbed into the JR East network upon the privatization of JNR on April 1, 1987, and elevated to full station status at the same time. In fiscal 2006, the station was used by an average of 48 passengers daily.

== Passenger statistics ==
In fiscal 2006, the station was used by an average of 86 passengers daily.]

== Surrounding area ==
- National Route 409
- Obitsu River

== See also ==
- List of railway stations in Japan
