= Iwane Station =

Railway station in Kisarazu, Chiba Prefecture, Japan

Iwane Station 巌根駅
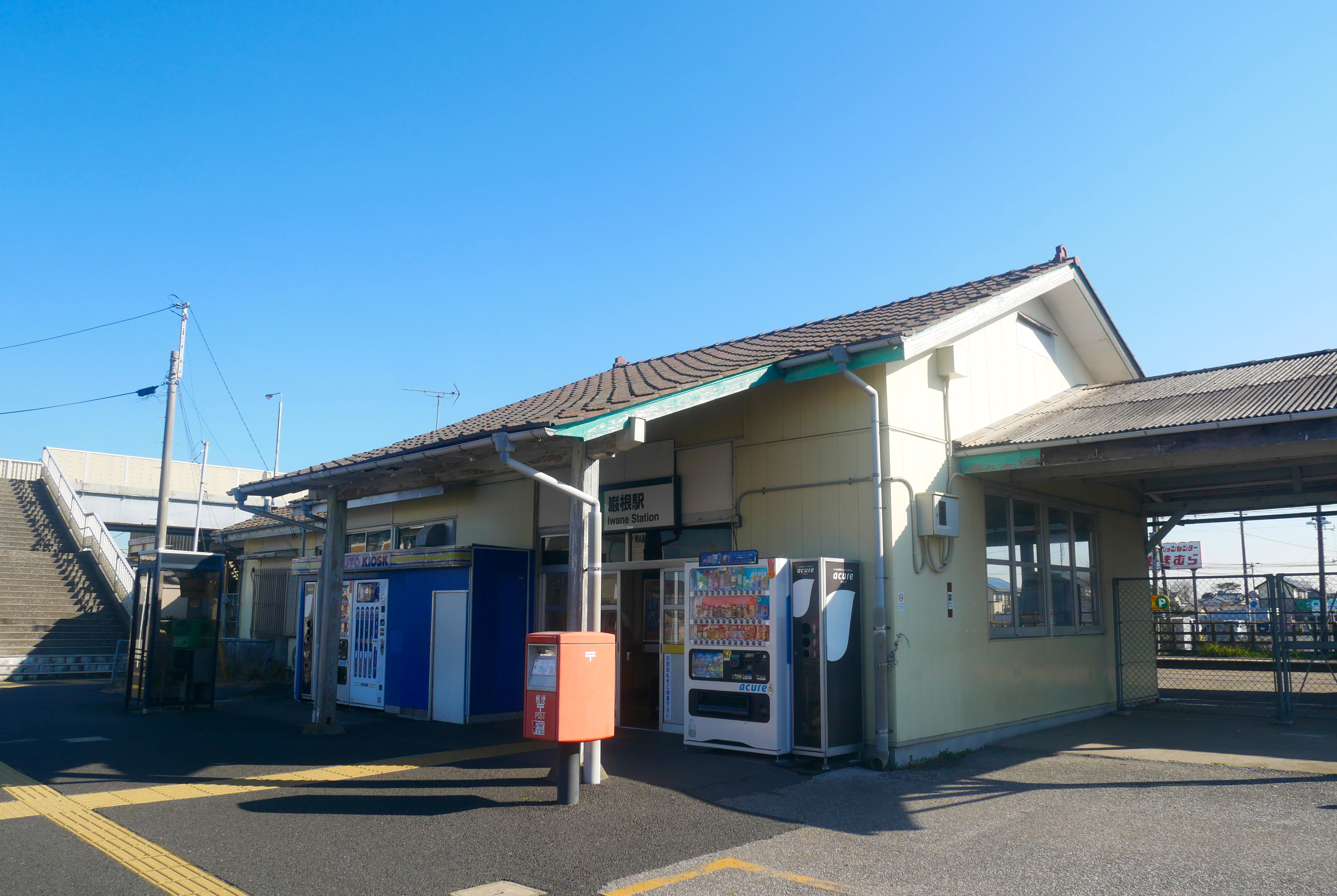
- Iwane Station, 2020

General information
- Location: Iwane 3-5-1, Kisarazu-shi, Chiba-ken 292-0061; Japan
- Coordinates: 35°24′47.32″N 139°56′00.06″E
- Operator: JR East
- Line: ■ Uchibō Line
- Distance: 27.5 km from Soga
- Platforms: 1 island platform

Other information
- Status: Staffed
- Website: Official website

History
- Opened: January 15, 1915

Passengers
- FY2019: 1715

Services
Preceding station	JR East	Following station
Sodegaura towards Soga	Uchibō Line Keiyō Rapid	Kisarazu towards Kazusa-Minato
Sodegaura towards Soga or Chiba	Uchibō Line Local	Kisarazu towards Awa-Kamogawa
Location
- Location within Chiba Prefecture Location within Japan

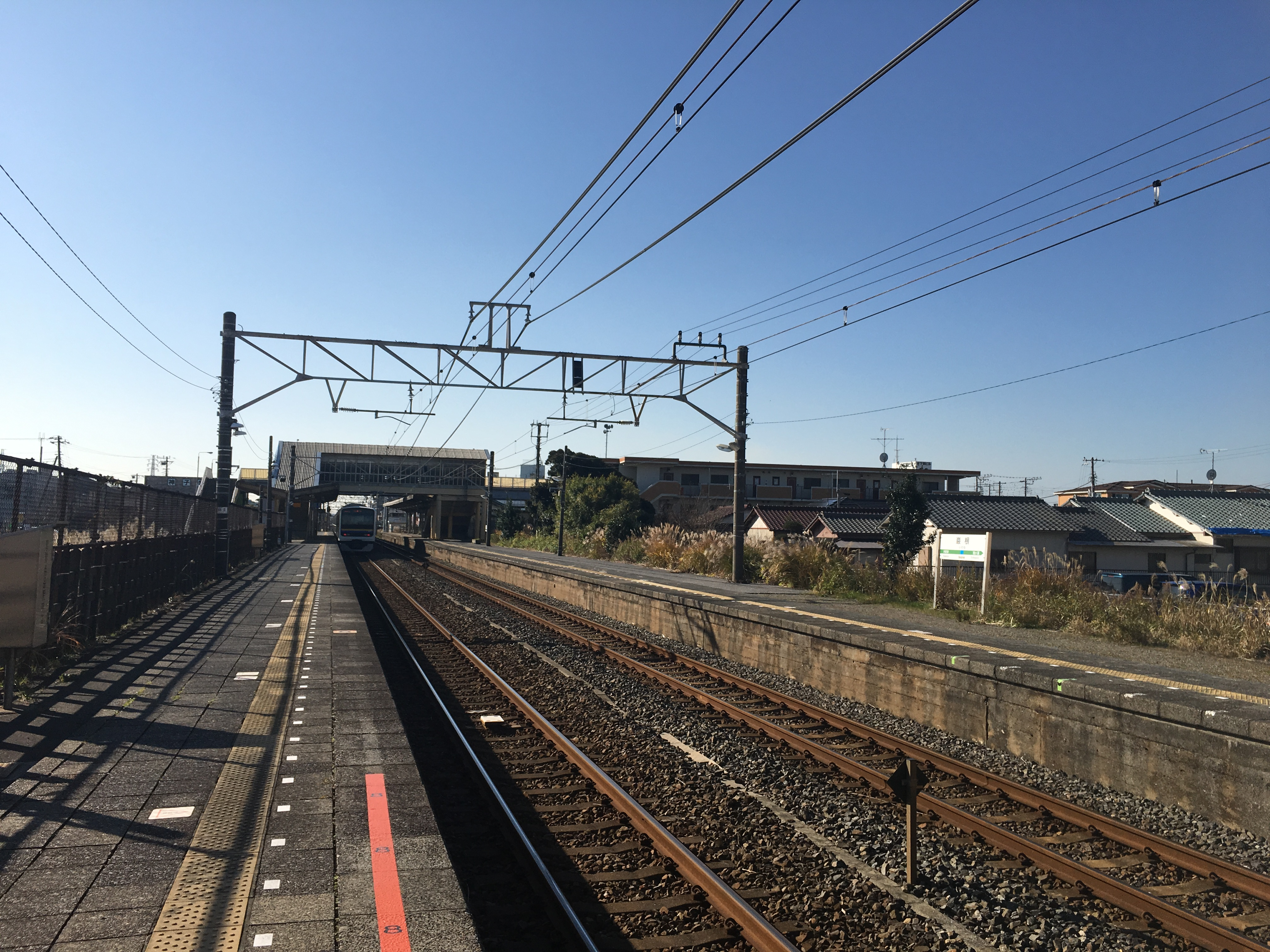
Station platforms, 2020

Iwane Station (巌根駅, Iwane-eki) is a passenger railway station in the city of Kisarazu, Chiba Prefecture, Japan, operated by the East Japan Railway Company (JR East).

== Lines ==
Iwane Station is served by the Uchibo Line, and is located 27.5 km from the starting point of the line at Soga Station.

== Station layout ==
Iwane Station consists of dual opposed side platforms serving two tracks, connected to the station building by a footbridge. The station is staffed.

=== Platforms ===
1	■ Uchibō Line	For Goi, Chiba
2	■ Uchibō Line	For Kimitsu, Kisarazu, Tateyama,Awa-Kamogawa

== History ==
Iwane Station was opened on November 20, 1941 as a station on the Japanese Government Railways (JGR) Bōsōnishi Line. It became part of the Japan National Railways (JNR) after World War II, and the line was renamed the Uchibō Line from July 15, 1972. Iwane Station was absorbed into the JR East network upon the privatization of the Japan National Railways (JNR) on April 1, 1987.

== Passenger statistics ==
In fiscal 2019, the station was used by an average of 1715 passengers daily (boarding passengers only).

== Surrounding area ==
- Tokyo Bay Aqua-Line
- National Route 16

== See also ==
- List of railway stations in Japan
