= Gion Station (Chiba) =

Railway station in Kisarazu, Chiba Prefecture, Japan

Gion Station 祇園駅
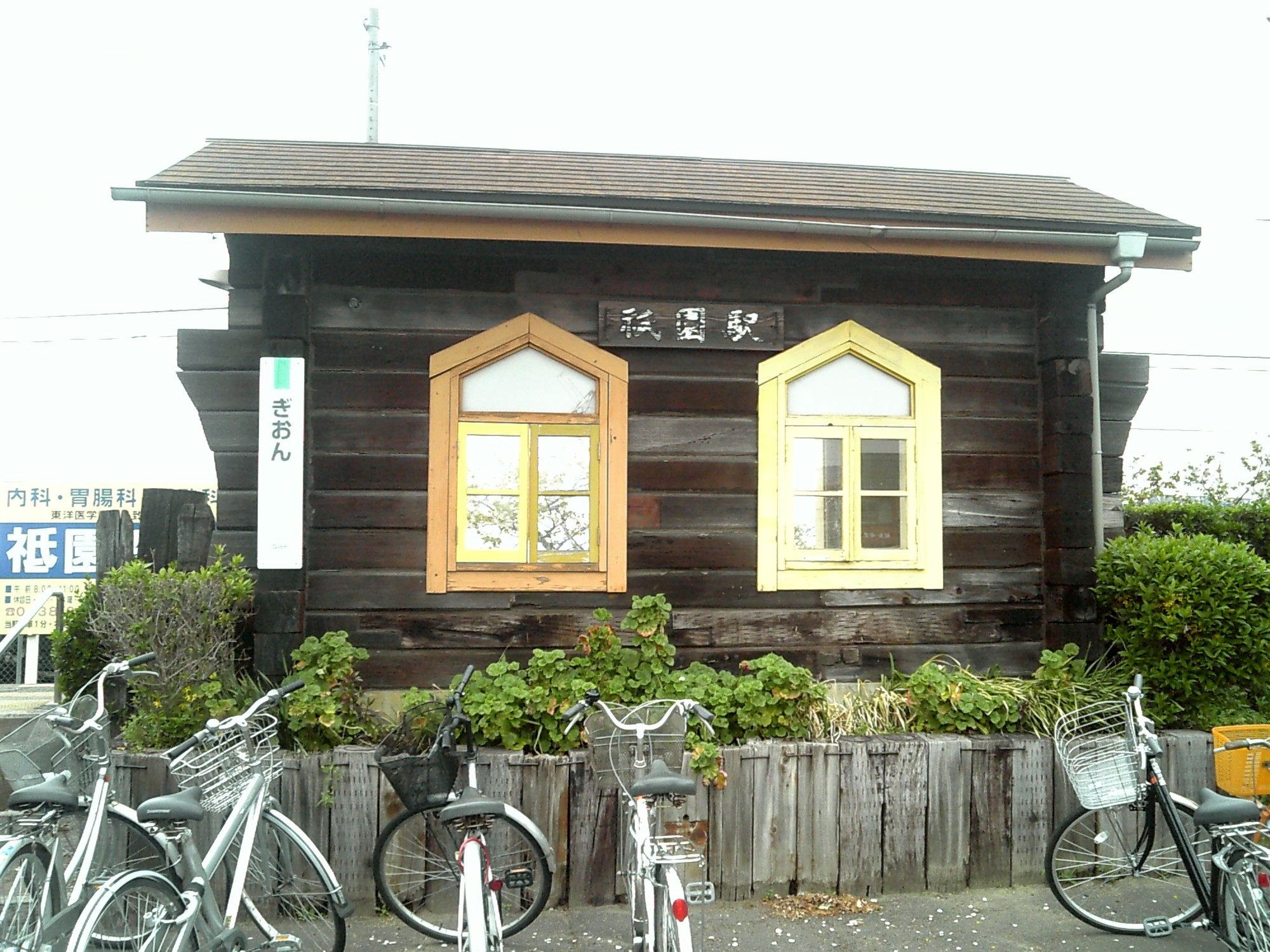
- Gion Station, April 2008

General information
- Location: Gion 473, Kisarazu-shi, Chiba-ken 292-0053; Japan
- Coordinates: 35°23′29.51″N 139°56′53.93″E
- Operator: JR East
- Line: ■ Kururi Line
- Distance: 2.6 km from Kisarazu
- Platforms: 1 side platform

Other information
- Status: Unstaffed
- Website: Official website

History
- Opened: March 1, 1961

Passengers
- FY2006: 319 daily

Services
Preceding station	JR East	Following station
Kisarazu Terminus	Kururi Line	Kazusa-Kiyokawa towards Kazusa-Kameyama
Location
- Location within Chiba Prefecture Location within Japan

Gion Station (祇園駅, Gion-eki) is a passenger railway station in the city of Kisarazu, Chiba Prefecture, Japan, operated by the East Japan Railway Company (JR East).

== Lines ==
Gion Station is a station on the Kururi Line, and is located 2.6 km from the terminus of the line at Kisarazu Station.

== Station layout ==
Gion Station has a single side platform serving bidirectional traffic. The platform is short, and can only handle trains with a length of five carriages or less. The station is unattended.

=== Platform ===
1	■ Kururi Line	Kisarazu; Kazusa-Kameyama

== History ==
Gion Station was opened on March 1, 1961. The station was absorbed into the JR East network upon the privatization of the Japan National Railways (JNR) on April 1, 1987.

== Passenger statistics ==
In fiscal 2006, the station was used by an average of 319 passengers daily.

== Surrounding area ==
- National Route 16
- National Route 409
- Kisarazu Municipal Baseball Stadium

== See also ==
- List of railway stations in Japan
