= Seiwa University =

Coordinates: 35°22′33.29″N 139°57′28.22″E

- 清和大学; Seiwa daigaku
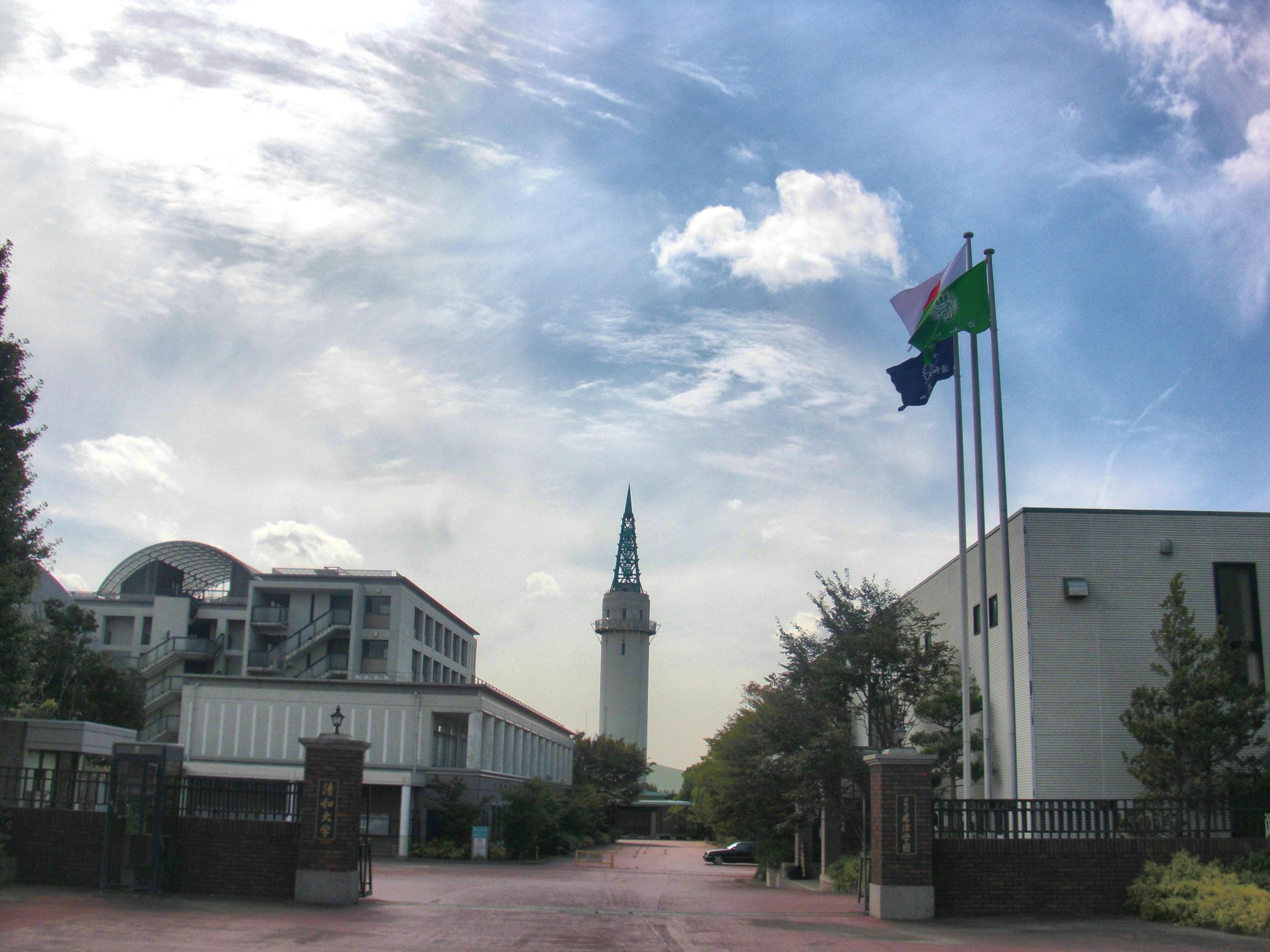
- Gate of Seiwa University
- Motto: True heart education
- Type: Private
- Established: 1994
- President: Masuo Maita
- Undergraduates: Faculty of Law
- Location: Kisarazu, Chiba, Japan
- Campus: Kisarazu
- Website: Official website

Seiwa University (清和大学, Seiwa daigaku) is a private university in Kisarazu, Chiba, Japan.
