= Kōzō-ji (Kisarazu, Chiba) =

Buddhist temple in Chiba Prefecture, Japan

Kōzō-ji 高蔵寺
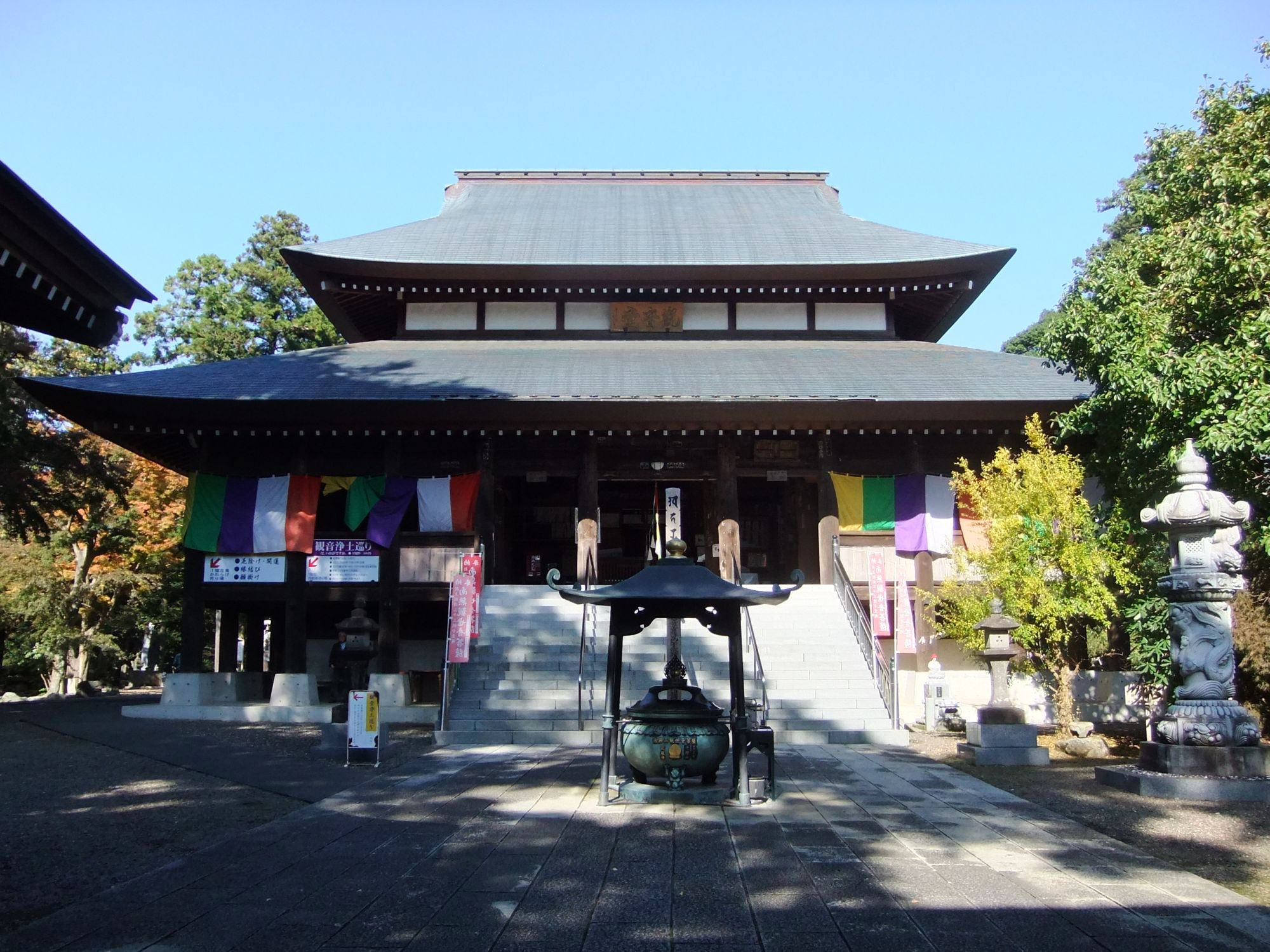
- Kōzō-ji Kannon-dō (Hondō)

- Location within Chiba Prefecture Location within Japan

Religion
- Affiliation: Buddhism
- Deity: Shō-Kannon
- Rite: Shingon-shu Buzan-ha

Location
- Location: 1245 Yana, Kisarazu-shi, Chiba-ken 292-0812
- Country: Japan
- Coordinates: 35°20′19.7″N 139°59′40″E

Architecture
- Founder: c.Emperor Yōmei
- Completed: c. 585-587

Website
- takakurakannon.com

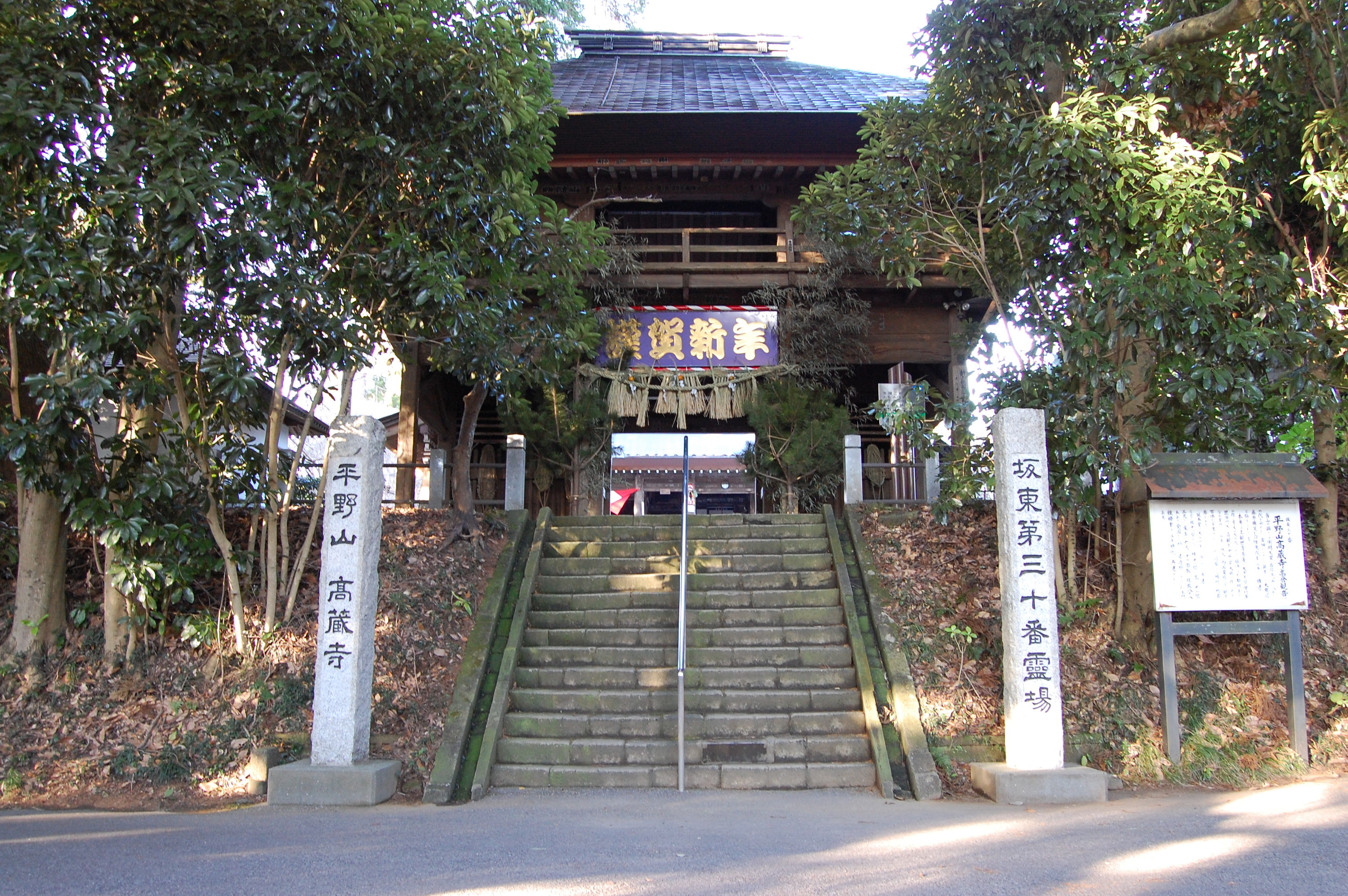
Sanmon gate

Kōzō-ji (高蔵寺) is a Buddhist temple located in the Yana neighbourhood of the city of Kisarazu, Chiba Prefecture, Japan. It belongs to the Shingon-shu Buzan-ha sect and its honzon is a statue of Sho-Kannon Bosatsu (Āryāvalokiteśvara). The temple's full name is Heiya-san Kōzō-ji (平野山 笠森寺).The temple is the 30th stop on the Bandō Sanjūsankasho pilgrimage route. The temple is also known as the "Takakura Kannon", and amulets issued by the temple are highly valued throughout Japan.

== Overview ==
The foundation of this temple is uncertain. According to the temple's legend, Kōzō-ji was founded in the Asuka period during the brief reign of Emperor Yōmei, father of Prince Shōtoku, and a vocal supporter of Buddhism. Later, the priest Gyōki built and dedicated the temple to the Kannon after having seen the bodhisattava in a vision. The area around the temple is associated with the mother of Fujiwara no Kamatari (614 – 669), a statesman, courtier and politician of the Nara period. Kamatari's mother despaired of giving birth to a son, but was told in a vision at this temple that she should visit Kashima Shrine, after which she gave birth to Fujiwara no Kamatari. Afterwards, the temple was rebuilt on a grand scale by Kamatari into a shichidō garan with a three-story Japanese pagoda. The subsequent history of the temple is largely obscure, but it was extensively rebuilt in 1526.

Kōzō-ji is in the Yano District of Kisarazu, which is one hour by bus from Kisarazu Station on the JR East Uchibō Line and Kururi Line.

== Cultural Properties ==
=== Kisarazu City Tangible Cultural Properties ===
- Kannon-dō (観音堂), Sengoku period. The Main Hall of the temple is a multi-story structure with a irimoya-zukuri style hip roof that slopes down on all four sides and integrates on two opposing sides with a gable. It was probably constructed in 1526. The temple's Sanmon and Shōrō are also designated as Kisarazu City Tangible Cultural Properties. The honzon Kannon statue was formerly a hibutsu hidden image is 3.6 metres (11.8 ft) high, and is made of a single piece of wood from a camphor tree. It is now on view to the general public.

== Observances ==
- February 2 -- Setsubun observance of the beginning of spring
- March -- Vernal Equinox Higan service
- August 18—Kannon Festival
- August 24 -- Segakie, a memorial service
- September -- Autumnal Equinox Higan service
- December -- 'Joya no Kane', ringing of the temple bell 108 times for the New Year
