= Samukawa Shrine =

Shinto shrine in Kanagawa Prefecture, Japan

Samukawa Shrine 寒川神社
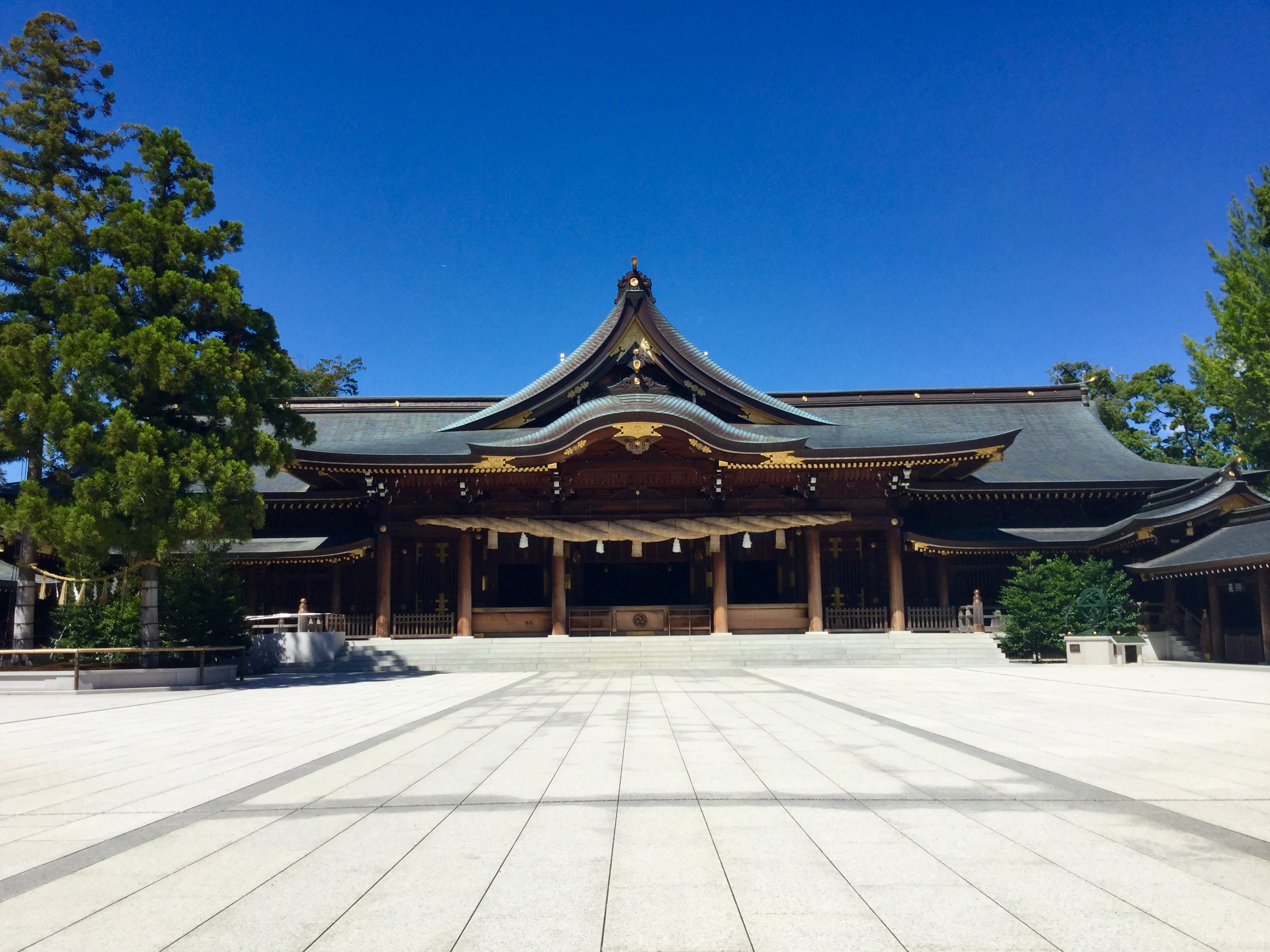
- Honden of Samukawa Shrine

- Location within Kanagawa Prefecture Location within Japan

Religion
- Affiliation: Shinto
- Deity: Samukawa Daimyojin
- Festival: September 20

Location
- Location: 3916 Miyayama, Samukawa-machi, Koza-gun, Kanagawa
- Interactive map of Samukawa Shrine 寒川神社
- Coordinates: 35°22′43″N 139°22′53″E

Architecture
- Established: unknown

Website
- Official website

Samukawa Shrine (寒川神社, Samukawa jinja) is a Shinto shrine in the Miyayama neighborhood of the town of Samukawa, Kōza District. Kanagawa Prefecture, Japan. It is the ichinomiya of former Sagami Province. The main festival of the shrine is held annually on September 20. This shrine is one of the most famous shrines around Tokyo, where about 2 million people visit each year.

== Enshrined kami ==
The kami enshrined at Samukawa Jinja is:

- Samukawa Daimyōjin (寒川大明神), an amalgamation of the male Samukawa-hiko no mikoto (寒川比古命) and the female Samukawa-hime no mikoto (寒川比女命)

== History ==
The origins of Samukawa Shrine are unknown. Unverifiable shrine legend states that during the reign of Emperor Yūryaku (418-479), messengers were sent to this shrine from the imperial court. The earliest written records indicate that the shrine was rebuilt in the year 727, and its name also appears in the Shoku Nihon Kōki entry for the year 846. By the time of the 923 AD Engishiki, the shrine is styled as the only shrine in Sagami Province to be a Myōjin-taisha (名神大社). There is also a mystery regarding the kami enshrined. The current kami are given the collective name of "Samukawa Daimyōjin", about whom nothing is known. One theory identifies these kami as being associated with Ise Province, as they are also worshipped at the Muyano Shrine, a sub-shrine of the Ise Grand Shrine. Another theory identifies them as the children of Ominakami no mikoto (大水上命), who may or may to be the same as Ōyamatsumi. It is also possible that these kami are the ancestors of the Samukawa clan, the Sagami Kuni no miyatsuko. None of these theories are mutually exclusive.

At present, the shrine is located on a low plateau on the left bank of the Sagami River, about seven kilometers inland in the central southern part of Kanagawa Prefecture; however, during the Yayoi period, it was located on the shore of an inlet of Sagami Bay which extended far inland from the present shoreline. The ancient Tōkaidō highway crossed the Sagami River passed the east side of Samukawa Shrine. In the Azuma Kagami of the Kamakura period, Samukawa Shrine is identified as the ichinomiya of Sagami Province, and there was a dedication ceremony at the shrine on the birth of Minamoto no Yoriie. Afterwards, the shrine was patronized by the Hōjō clan, and in the Sengoku period by the Later Hōjō clan. Takeda Shingen visited the shrine and donated a kabuto helmet and sword to pray for victory when he attacked Odawara Castle in October 1569.

Following the Meiji restoration, in 1871 the shrine was designated an National shrine, 2nd rank (国幣中社, kokuhei-chūsha) under the Modern system of ranked Shinto Shrines.

The shrine is a five-minute walk from Miyayama Station on the JR East Sagami Line.

== Gallery ==
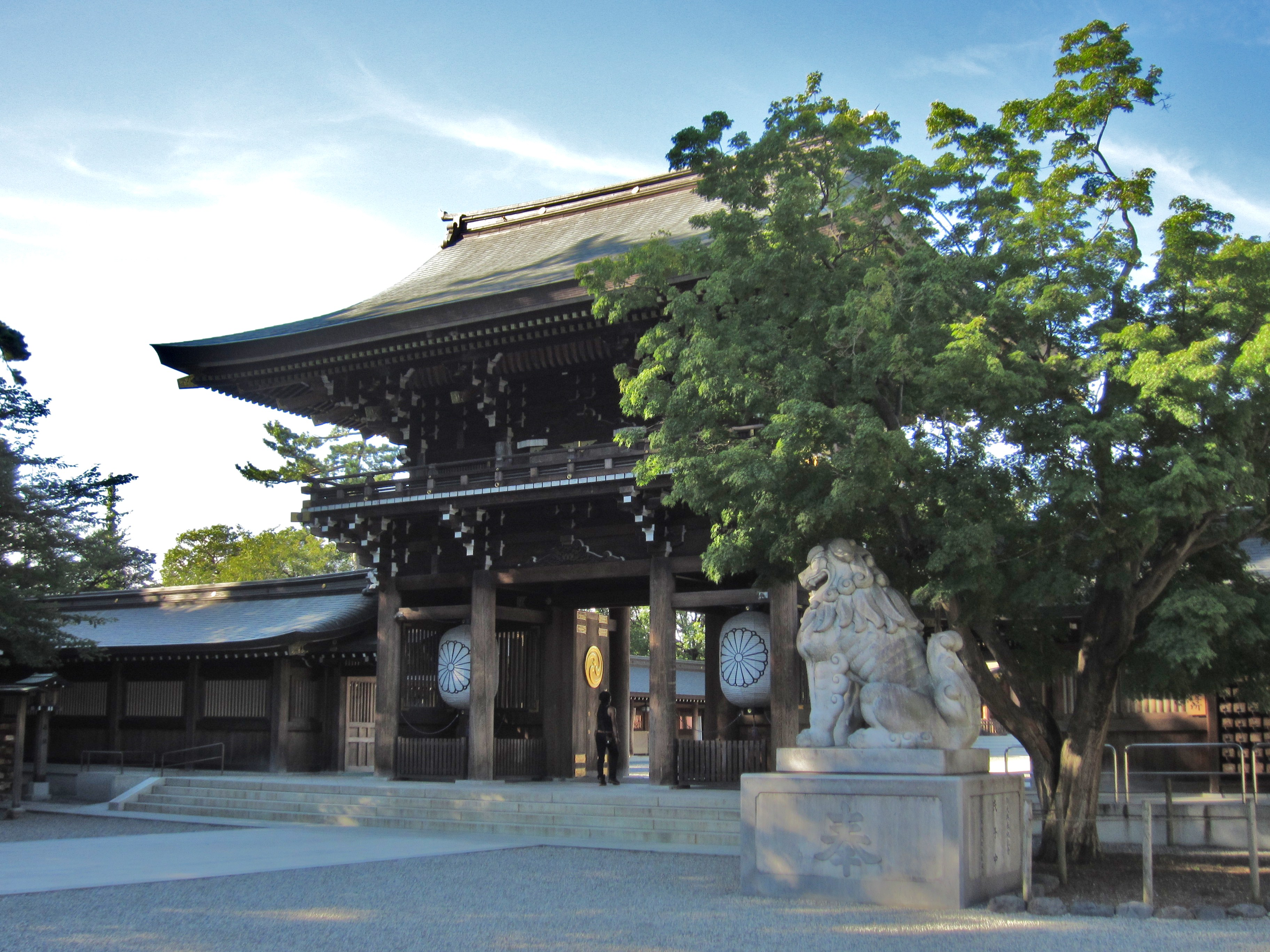
Gate

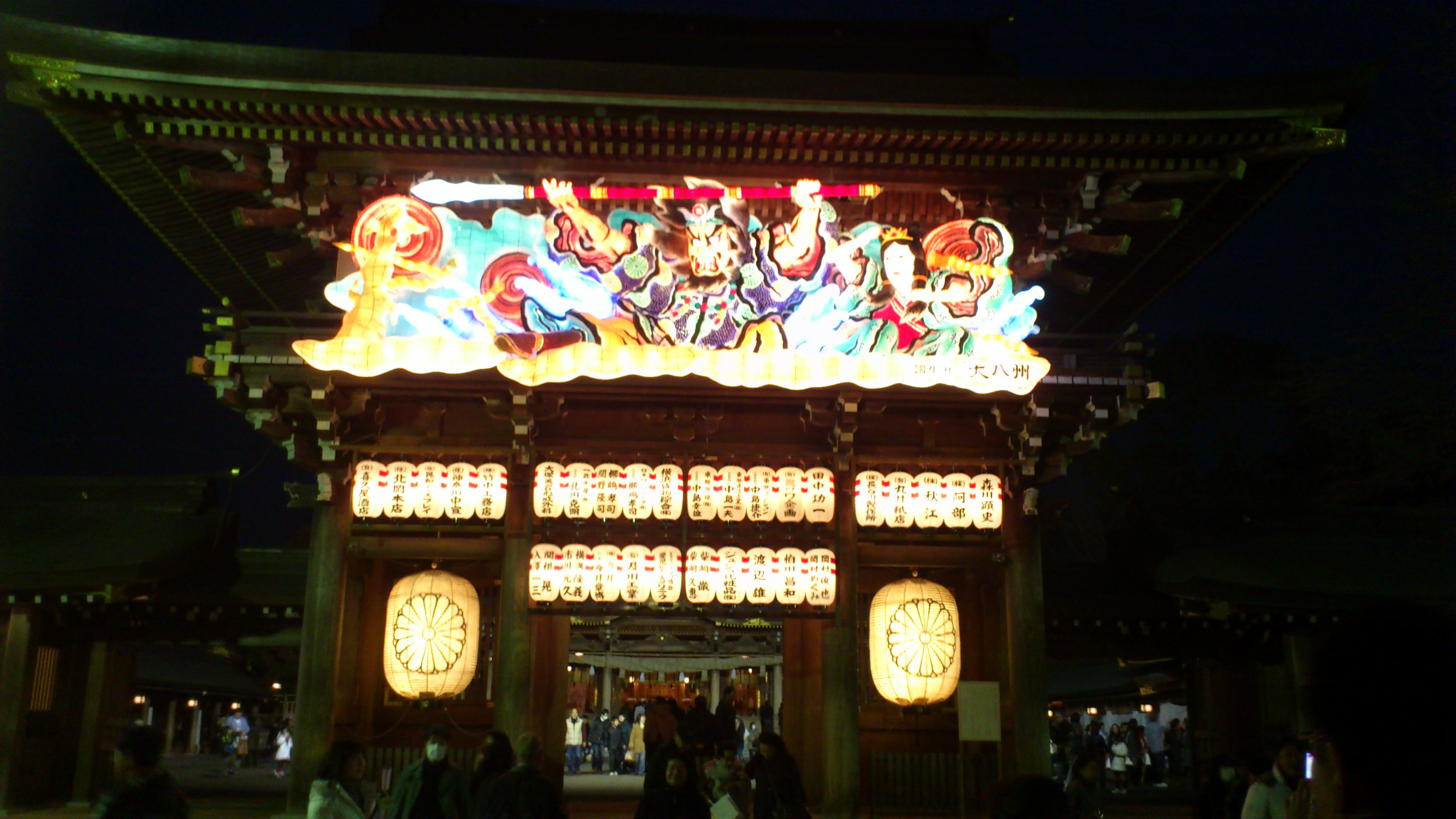
Nebuta-style decorations on gate during festival

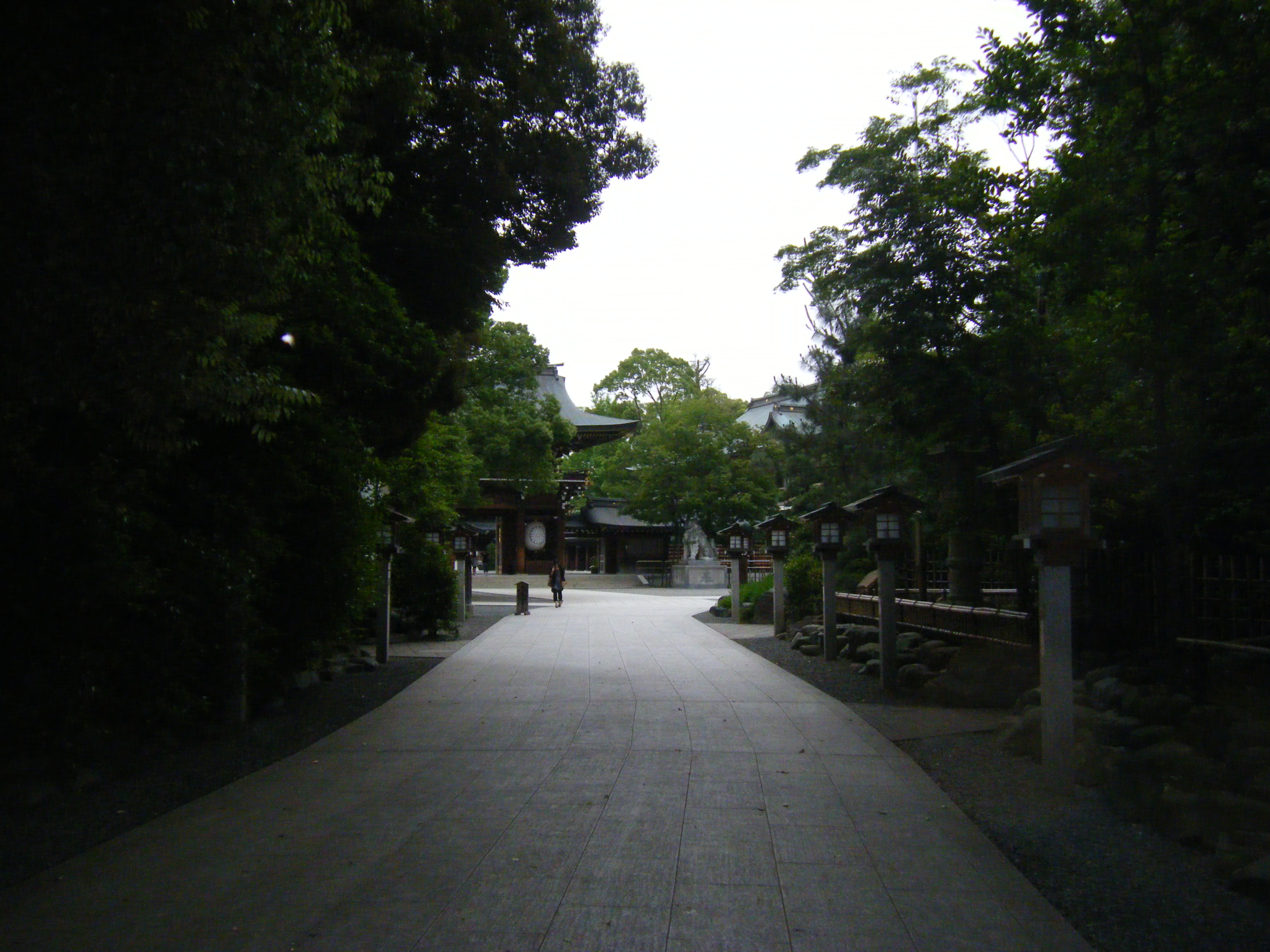
Precincts

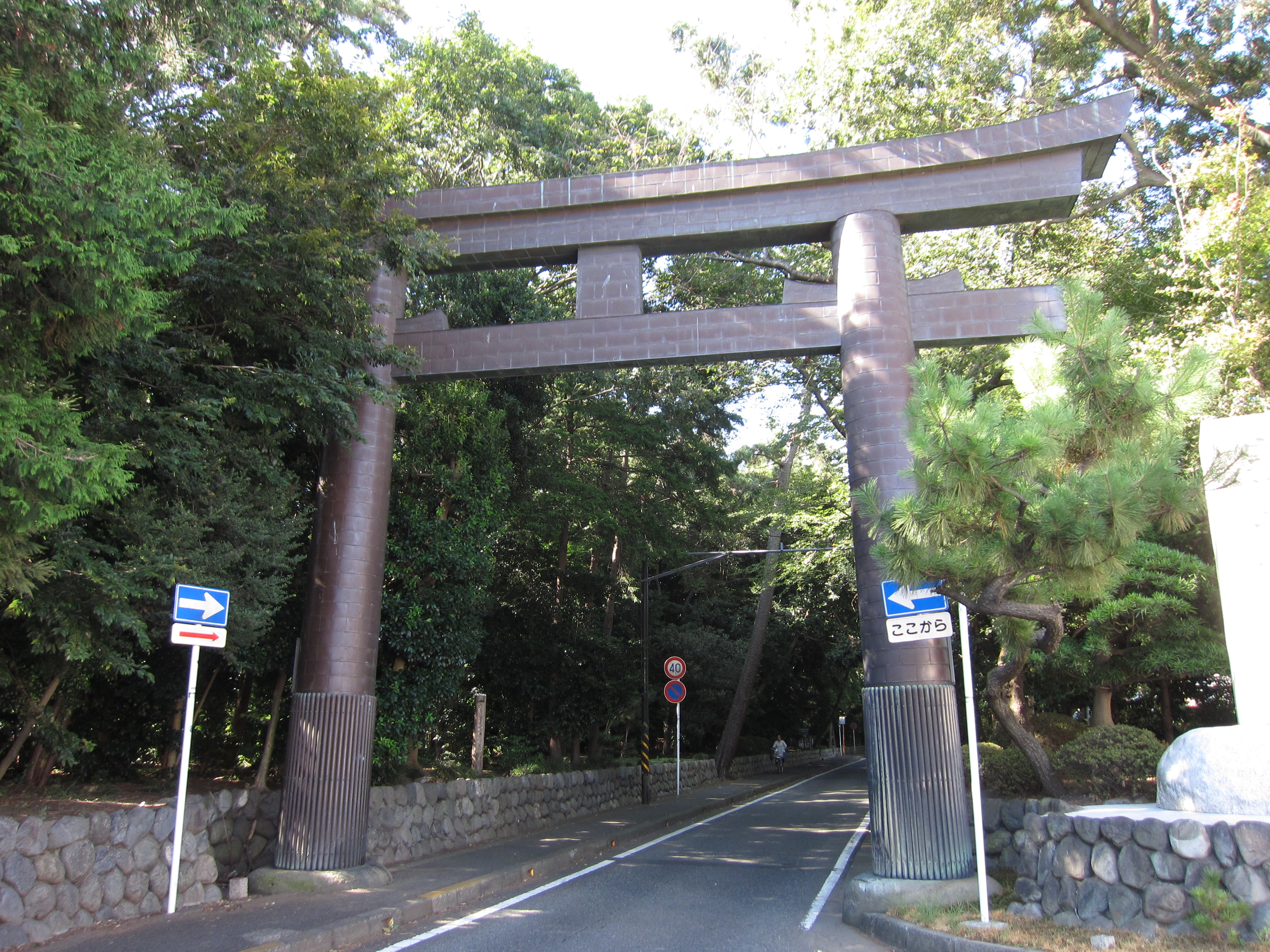
Ichi-no-Torii

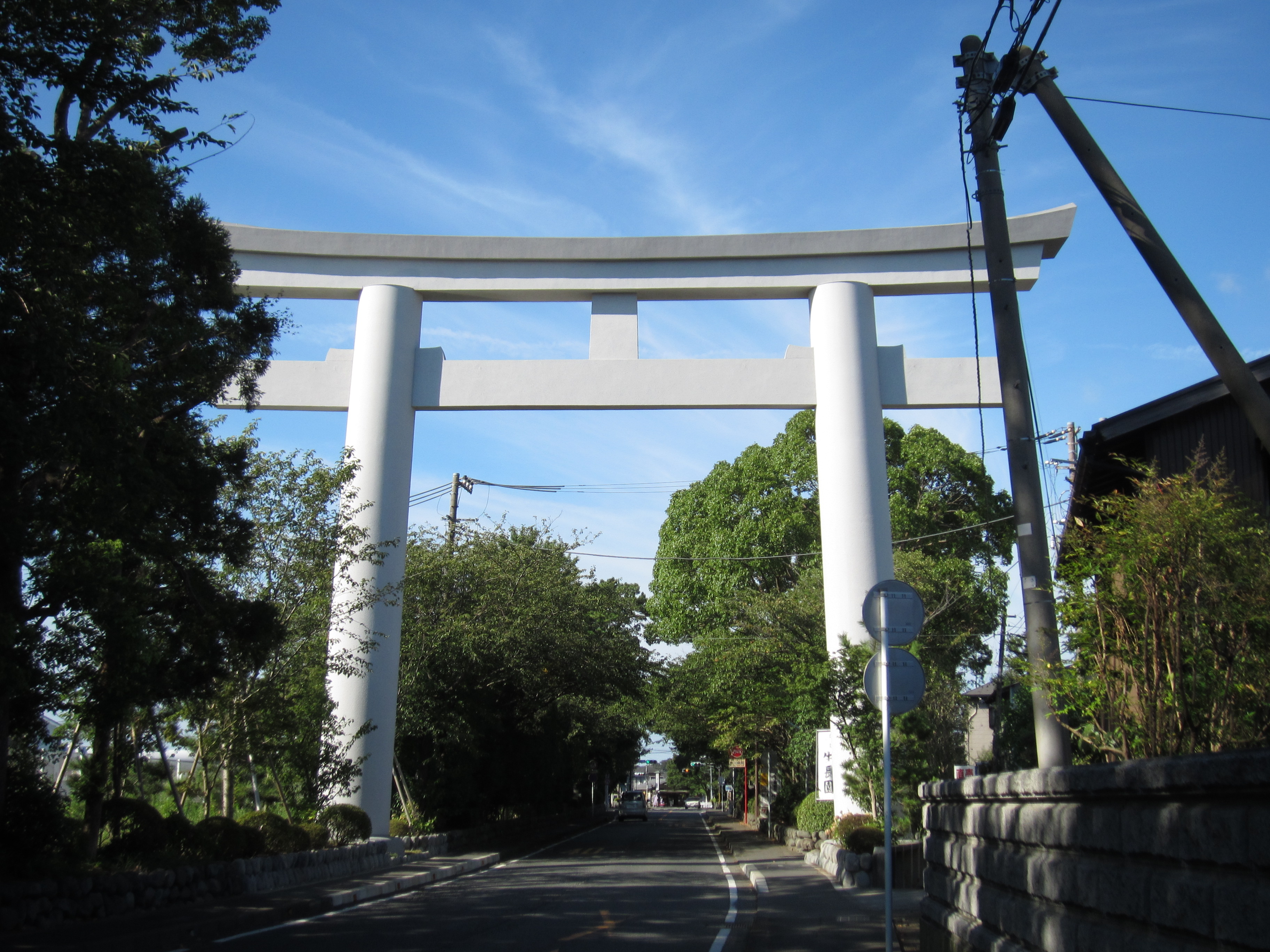
Ni-no-Torii

== Cultural Properties ==
=== Kanagawa Prefectural Designated Tangible Cultural Properties ===
- Helm with Remaining Metal Fittings (六十二間筋兜鉢・附金具残闕三種), Sengoku period (1537); According to shrine legend, this helmet was donated by Takeda Shingen in October 1569 as a prayer for victory when he attacked Odawara Castle. Another version is that it was donated as an apology for burning down the area surrounding the shrine and setting up a temporary camp during the battleOriginally, the entire helmet was painted black, but most of it has peeled off over time. Currently, only the black lacquer remains on the visor and some of the lines, leaving the rest of the helmet a rusted iron base. The bowl's thick, well-forged base metal is a meticulous example of the Sujikabuto bowls produced in the Kanto region during the Sengoku period. The underside of the bowl is inscribed with the date "Tenbun 6 (year 6), Chotouri (year 6), March, auspicious day," the name and signature of the bowl's maker, Fusamune, as well as the three shrine titles of Amaterasu Omikami Shrine, Hachiman Daibosatsu, and Kasuga Daimyojin, and the Heart Sutra. The bowl is also unique in that it is engraved with gilt bronze rivets bearing the Takeda clan crest, the diamond crest, suggesting that it was likely donated by Shingen, as per the shrine tradition. Regarding Shingen's use and donation of the helmet, armor researcher Ichiro Miura suggests that Shingen donated the helmet as a protest against the collapse of the Takeda-Hojo Alliance in 1568.

== Festivals ==
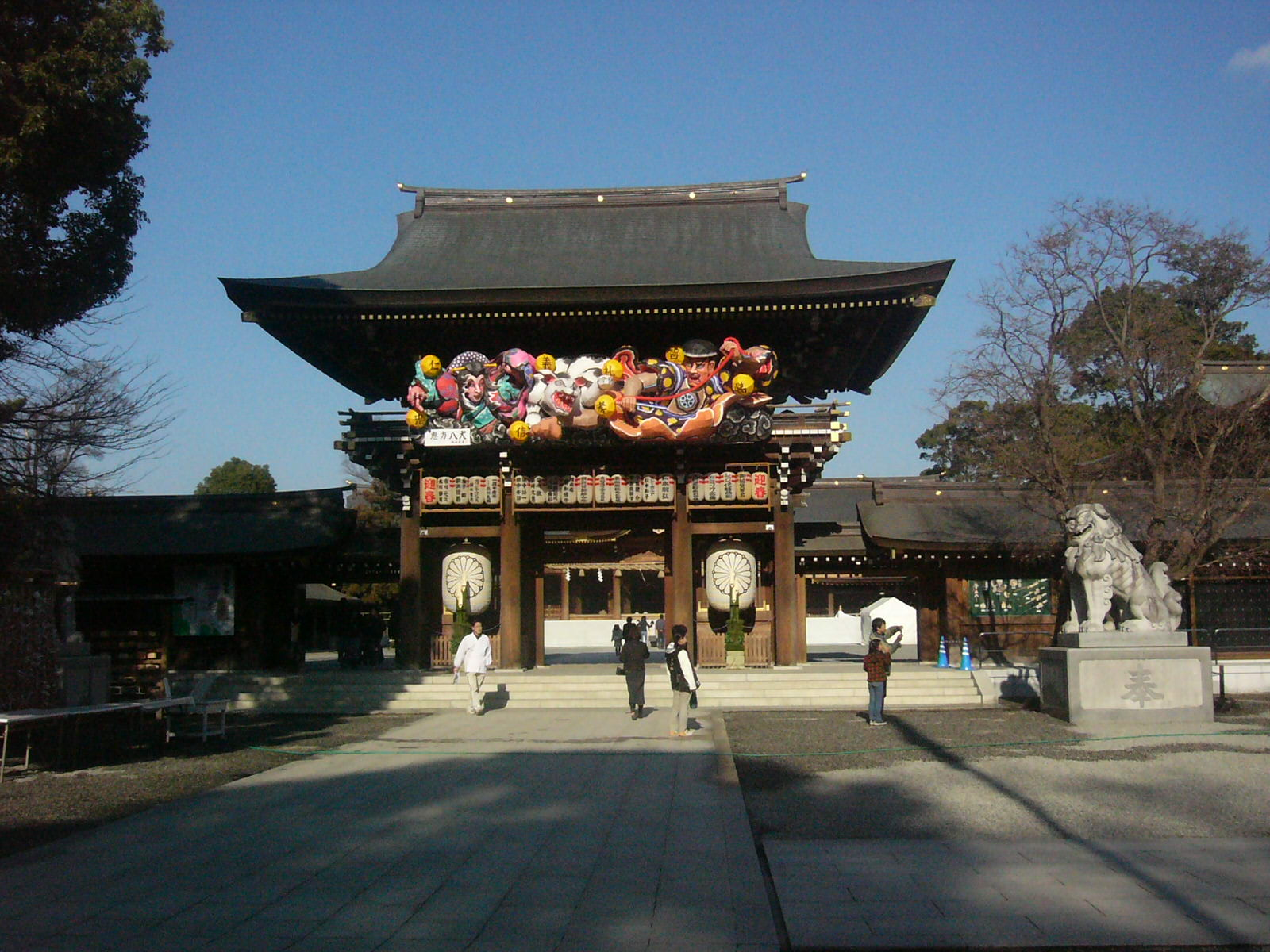
Main gate of Samukawa Shrine

The main festival of the shrine is held annually on September 20, and features yabusame performances. During the Setsubun festival in February, illuminated paper figures are hung from the main gate in a style similar to that of the Nebuta in Aomori Prefecture.

== Related information ==
Brooklyn Botanic Garden in New York City has a Mikoshi donated by Samukawa Shrine.

== See also ==
- List of Shinto shrines
- Ichinomiya
