= Kurami Station =

Railway station in Samukawa, Kanagawa Prefecture, Japan

Kurami Station 倉見駅
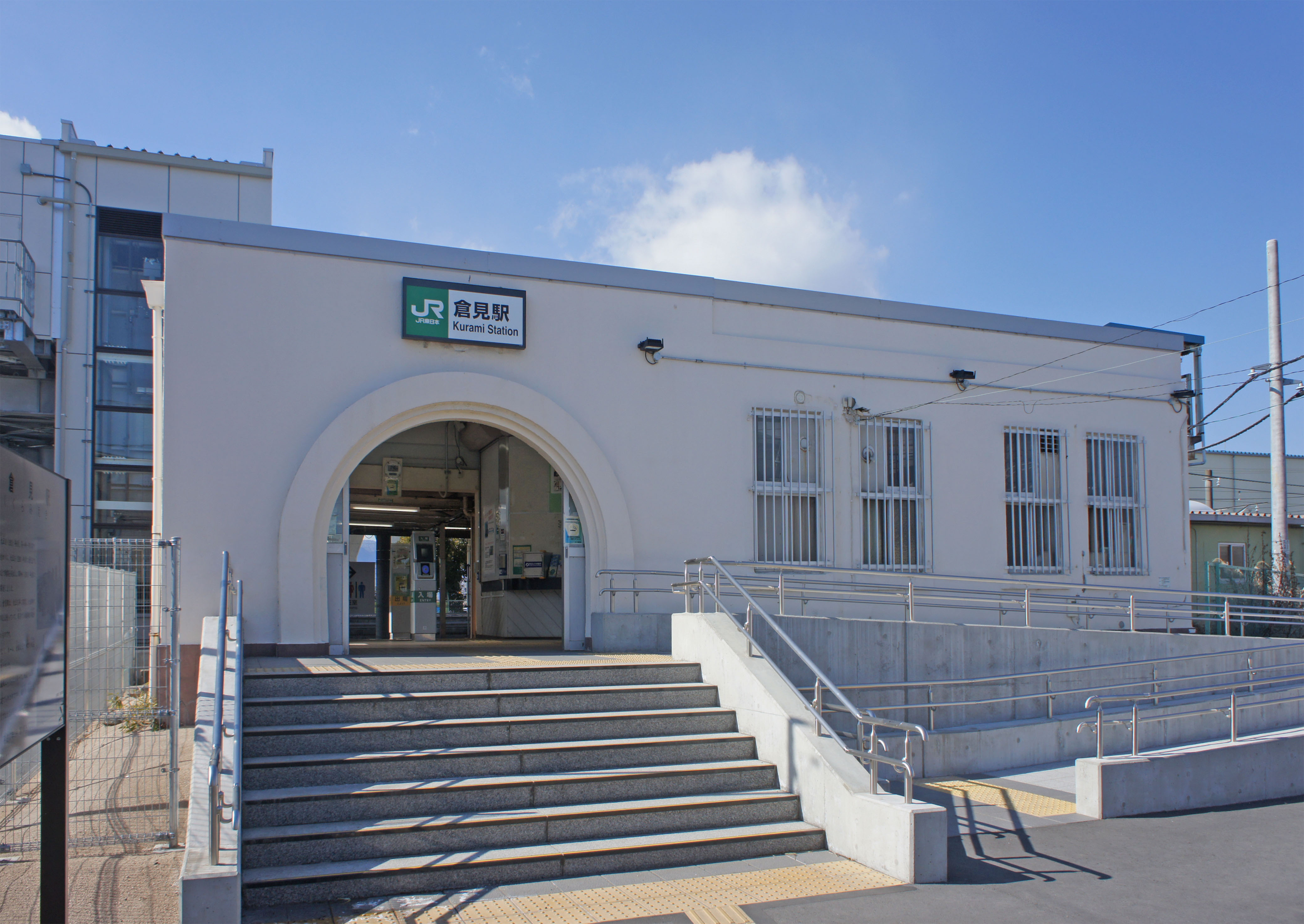
- Kurami Station, February 2022

General information
- Location: Kurami 3823, Samukawa-machi, Koza-gun, Kanagawa-ken 253-0101; Japan
- Coordinates: 35°23′41.8″N 139°22′42.9″E
- Operator: JR East
- Line: ■ Sagami Line
- Distance: 8.6 km from Chigasaki.
- Platforms: 1 island platform
- Connections: Bus stop

Other information
- Status: Unstaffed
- Website: Official website

History
- Opened: April 1, 1926

Passengers
- FY2014: 1,947 daily

Services
Preceding station	JR East	Following station
Kadosawabashi towards Hachiōji	Sagami Line	Miyayama towards Chigasaki
Location
- Location within Kanagawa Prefecture Location within Japan

Kurami Station (倉見駅, Kurami-eki) is a passenger railway station located in the town of Samukawa, Kōza District. Kanagawa Prefecture, Japan.

== Lines ==
Kurami Station is served by the Sagami Line, and is located 8.6 kilometers from the terminal station of the line at Chigasaki.

== Station layout ==
The station consists of a single island platform connected by a footbridge to the station building. The station is unattended.

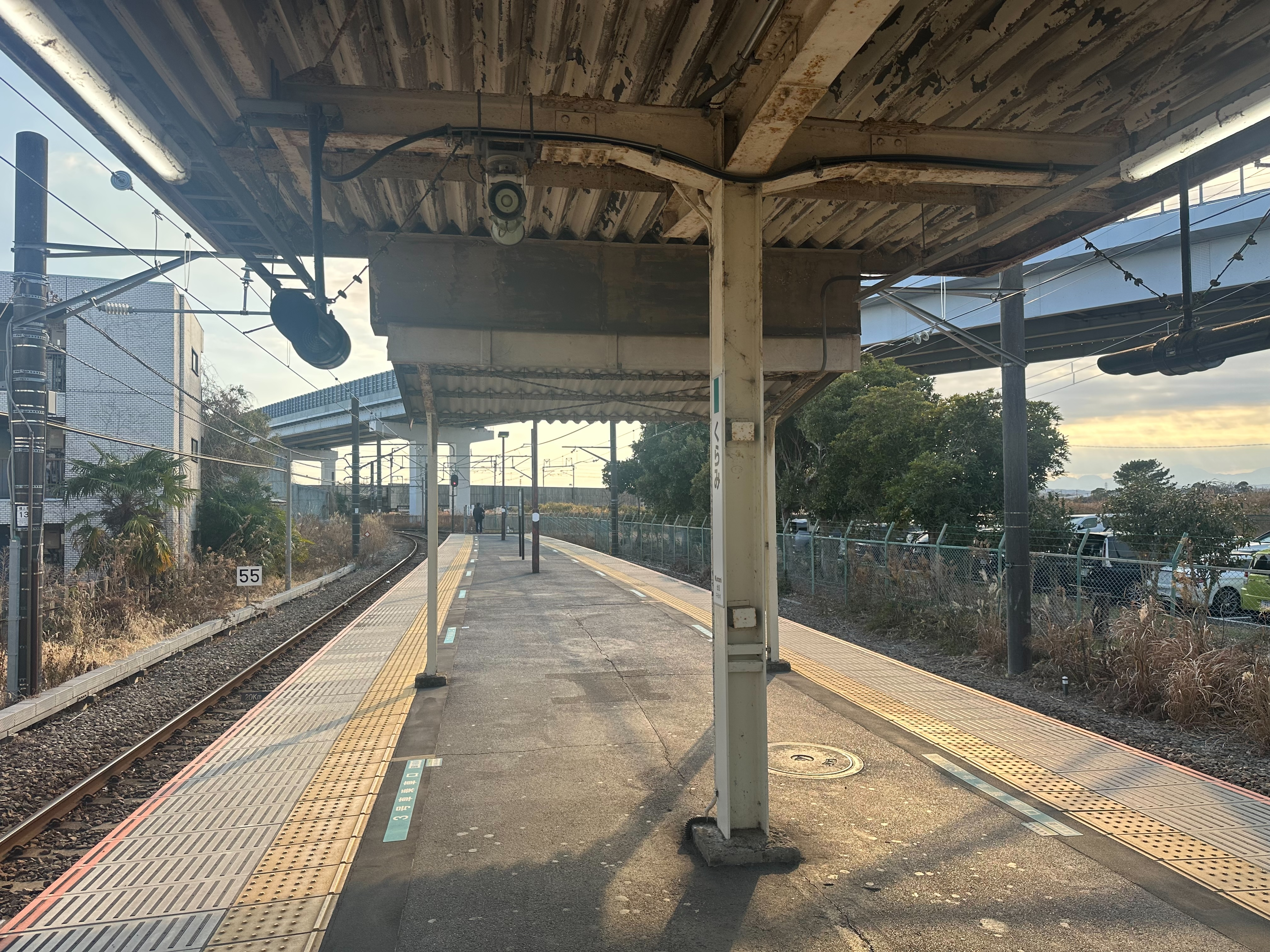
Station platform, 2024

=== Platforms ===
1	■ Sagami Line	for Chigasaki
2	■ Sagami Line	for Atsugi, Hashimoto, Hachiōji

== History ==
Kurami Station was opened on April 1, 1926 as the initial terminal station the Sagami Railway. The line was extended to Atsugi on July 15, 1926 and freight services were initiated on the same day. On June 1, 1944, the Sagami Railway was nationalized and merged with the Japan National Railways. Freight services were discontinued in 1961. On April 1, 1987, with the dissolution and privatization of the Japan National Railways, the station came under the operation of JR East. Automated turnstiles using the Suica IC card system came into operation from November 2001.

=== Possible future development ===
In June 2010, it was announced that a new station on the Tokaido Shinkansen in the town of Samukawa was under consideration by JR Central. Locals have petitioned the company for a station in the town, and identified the area around Kurami Station as a possible candidate for a new station. If this plan were to go through, the station would open after the completion of the first stage of the Chūō Shinkansen.

== Passenger statistics ==
In fiscal 2014, the station was used by an average of 1,947 passengers daily (boarding passengers only).

== Surrounding area ==
- JX Metals, Kurami plant
- Kirin Sagami plant

== See also ==
- List of railway stations in Japan
