= Samukawa Station =

Railway station in Samukawa, Kanagawa Prefecture, Japan

Samukawa Station 寒川駅
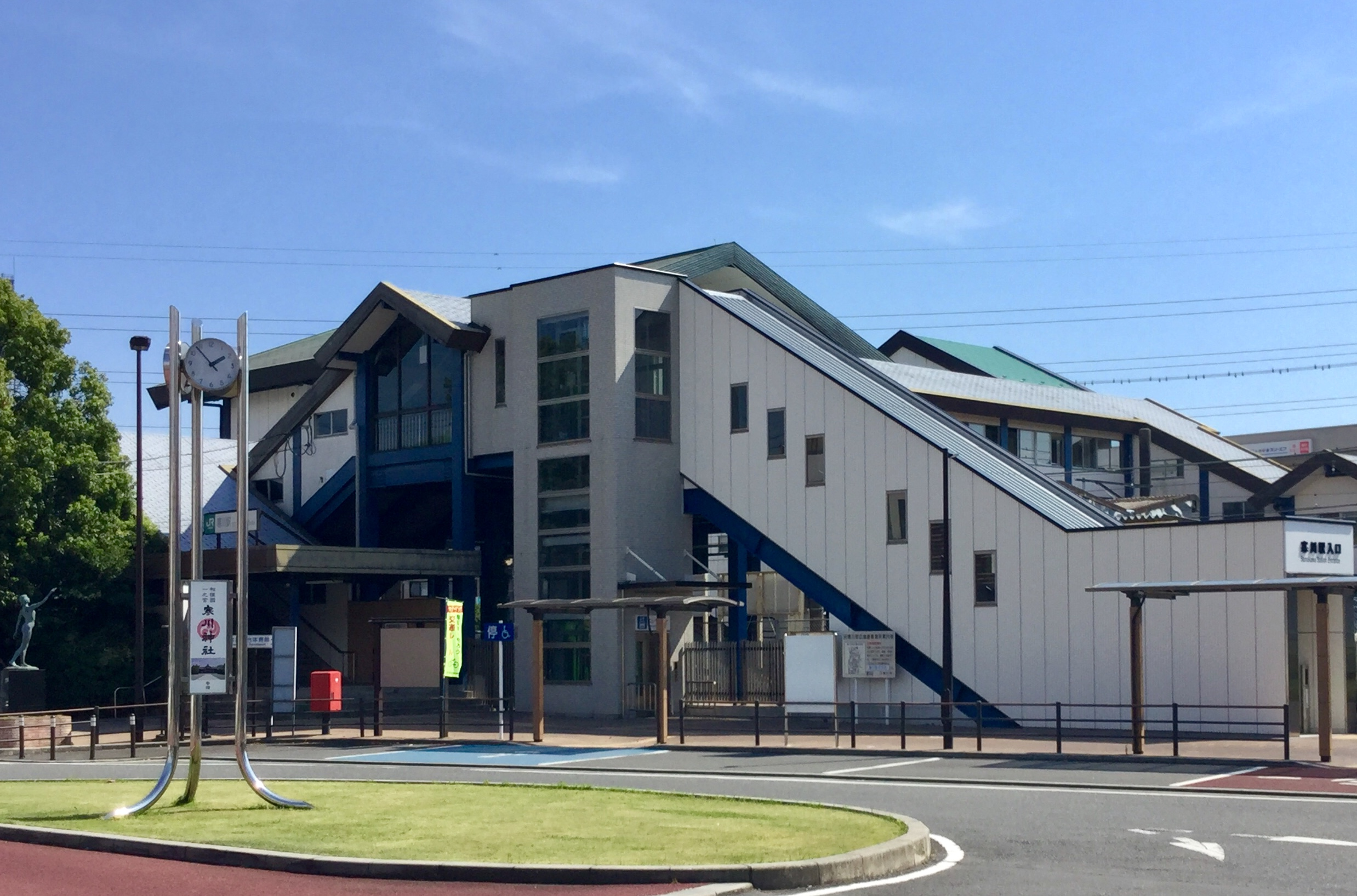
- Samukawa Station, August 2018

General information
- Location: Okada 148-1, Samukawa-machi, Kōza-gun, Kanagawa-ken 253-0105; Japan
- Coordinates: 35.367719°N 139.3873°E
- Operator: JR East
- Line: ■ Sagami Line
- Distance: 5.1 km from Chigasaki.
- Platforms: 1 island platform
- Connections: Bus stop

Other information
- Status: Staffed (Midori no Madoguchi)
- Website: Official website

History
- Opened: September 28, 1921

Passengers
- FY2019: 6,822 daily

Services
Preceding station	JR East	Following station
Miyayama towards Hachiōji	Sagami Line	Kagawa towards Chigasaki
Location
- Location within Kanagawa Prefecture Location within Japan

Samukawa Station (寒川駅, Samukawa-eki) is a passenger railway station located in the town of Samukawa, Kōza District. Kanagawa Prefecture, Japan, operated by the East Japan Railway Company (JR East).

== Lines ==
Samukawa Station is served by the Sagami Line, and is located 5.1 kilometers from the terminal station of the line at Chigasaki.

== Station layout ==
The station consists of a single island platform with an elevated station building built over the tracks and platform. The station has a Midori no Madoguchi staffed ticket office.

=== Platforms ===
1	■ Sagami Line	for Chigasaki
2	■ Sagami Line	for Atsugi, Hashimoto, Hachiōji

== History ==
Samukawa Station was opened on September 28, 1921 as a station the Sagami Railway. A freight spur line, the Nishi-Samukawa Spur Line, began operations from May 10, 1922 (Its operations were discontinued in 1984). On June 1, 1944, the Sagami Railway was nationalized and merged with the Japan National Railways. Freight operations were discontinued in 1971. On April 1, 1987, with the dissolution and privatization of the Japan National Railways, the station came under the operation of JR East. Automated turnstiles using the Suica IC card system came into operation from November 2001. The station building was remodeled and expanded in 2006.

== Passenger statistics ==
In fiscal 2019, the station was used by an average of 6,822 passengers daily (boarding passengers only).

The passenger figures (boarding passengers only) for previous years are as shown below.

Fiscal year	daily average
2005	6,595
2010	6,604
2015	6,787

== Surrounding area ==
- Samukawa Town Hall
- Nissan Koki head office

== Gallery ==
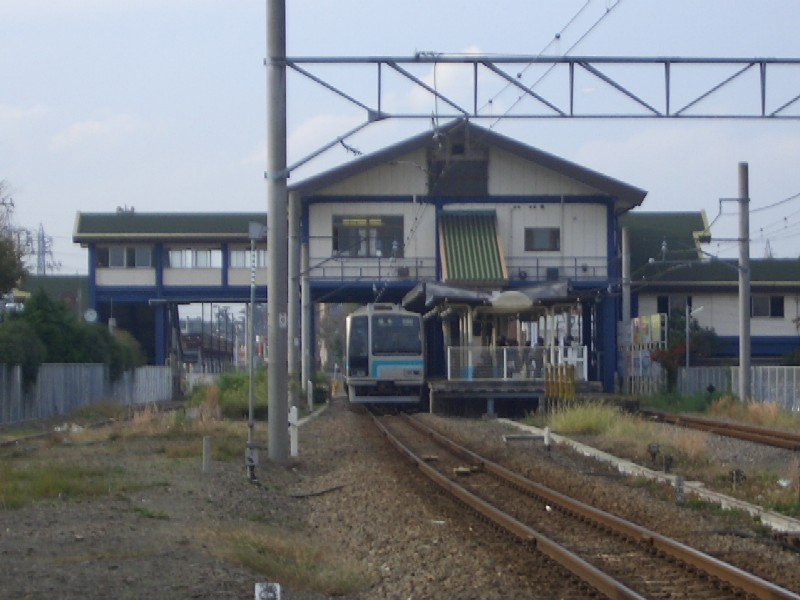
Side view of Samukawa Station

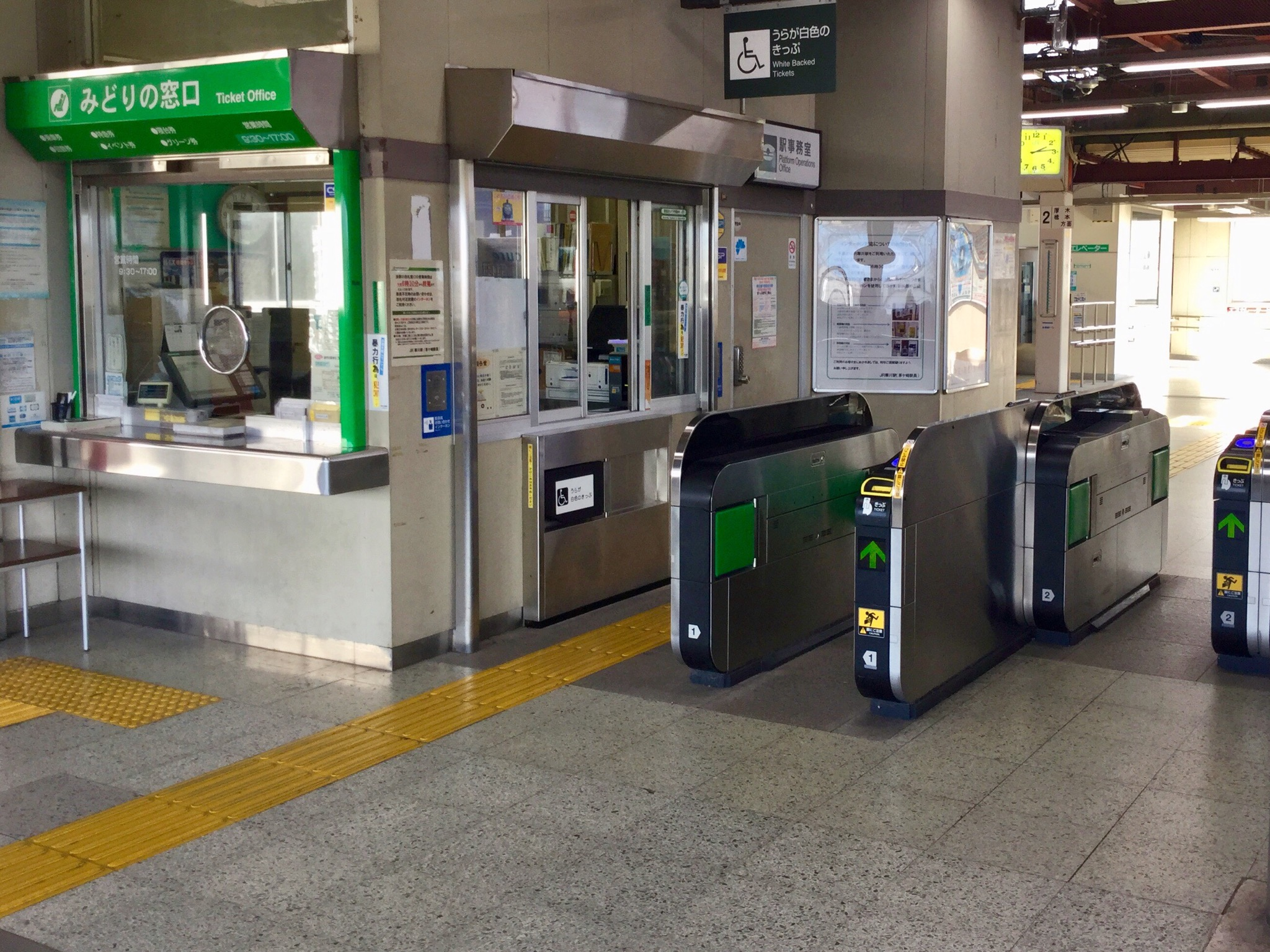
Inside Samukawa Station

== See also ==
- List of railway stations in Japan
