= Miyayama Station =

Railway station in Samukawa, Kanagawa Prefecture, Japan

Miyayama Station 宮山駅
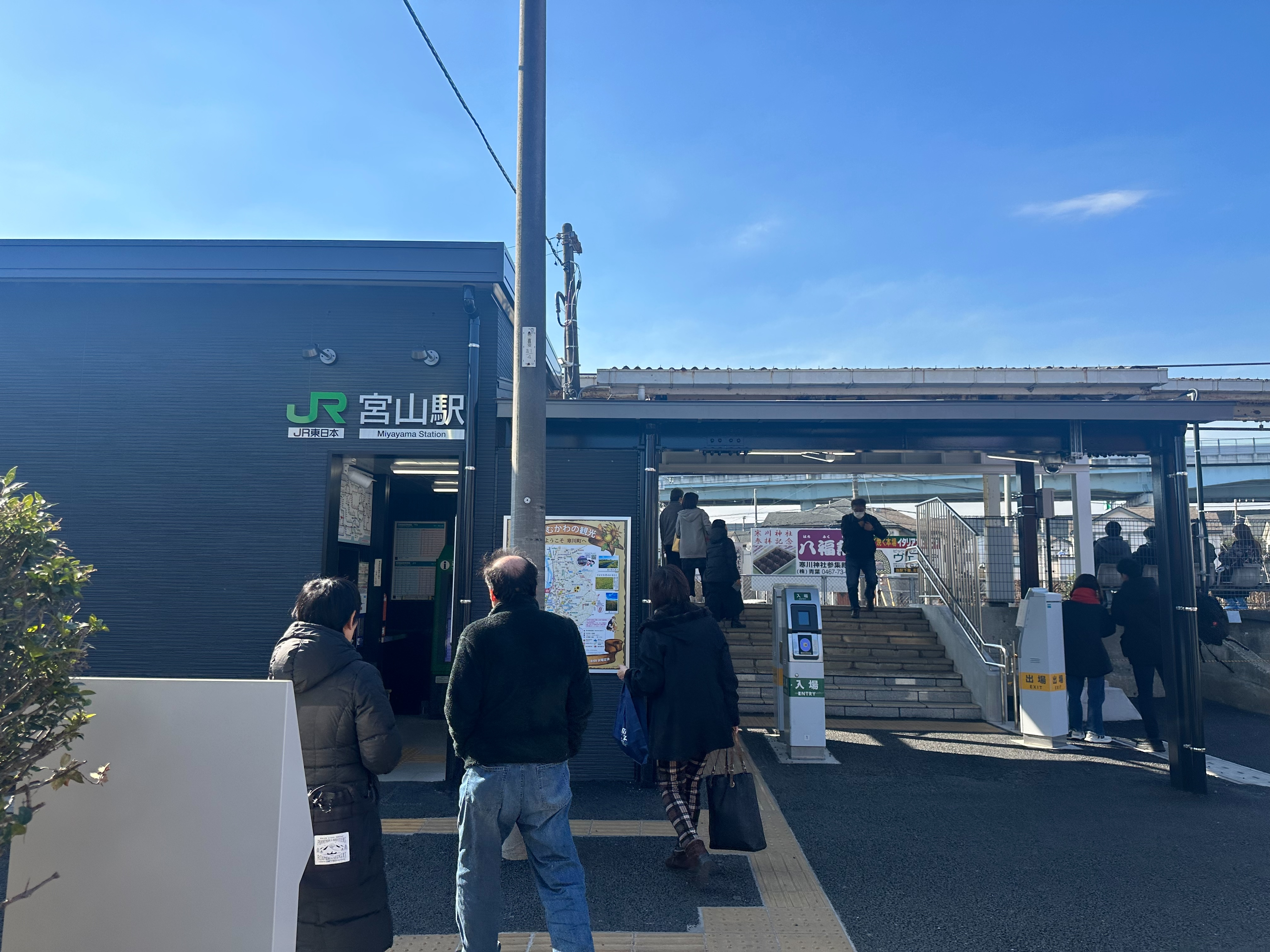
- Miyayama Station in 2024

General information
- Location: Miyayama 3605, Samukawa-machi, Kōza-gun, Kanagawa-ken 253-0106; Japan
- Coordinates: 35°22′56.2″N 139°22′47.1″E
- Operator: JR East
- Line: ■ Sagami Line
- Distance: 7.2 km from Chigasaki.
- Platforms: 1 side platform
- Connections

Other information
- Status: Unstaffed
- Website: Official website

History
- Opened: 1 July 1931

Passengers
- FY2014: 2,210 daily

Services
Preceding station	JR East	Following station
Kurami towards Hachiōji	Sagami Line	Samukawa towards Chigasaki
Location
- Location within Kanagawa Prefecture Location within Japan

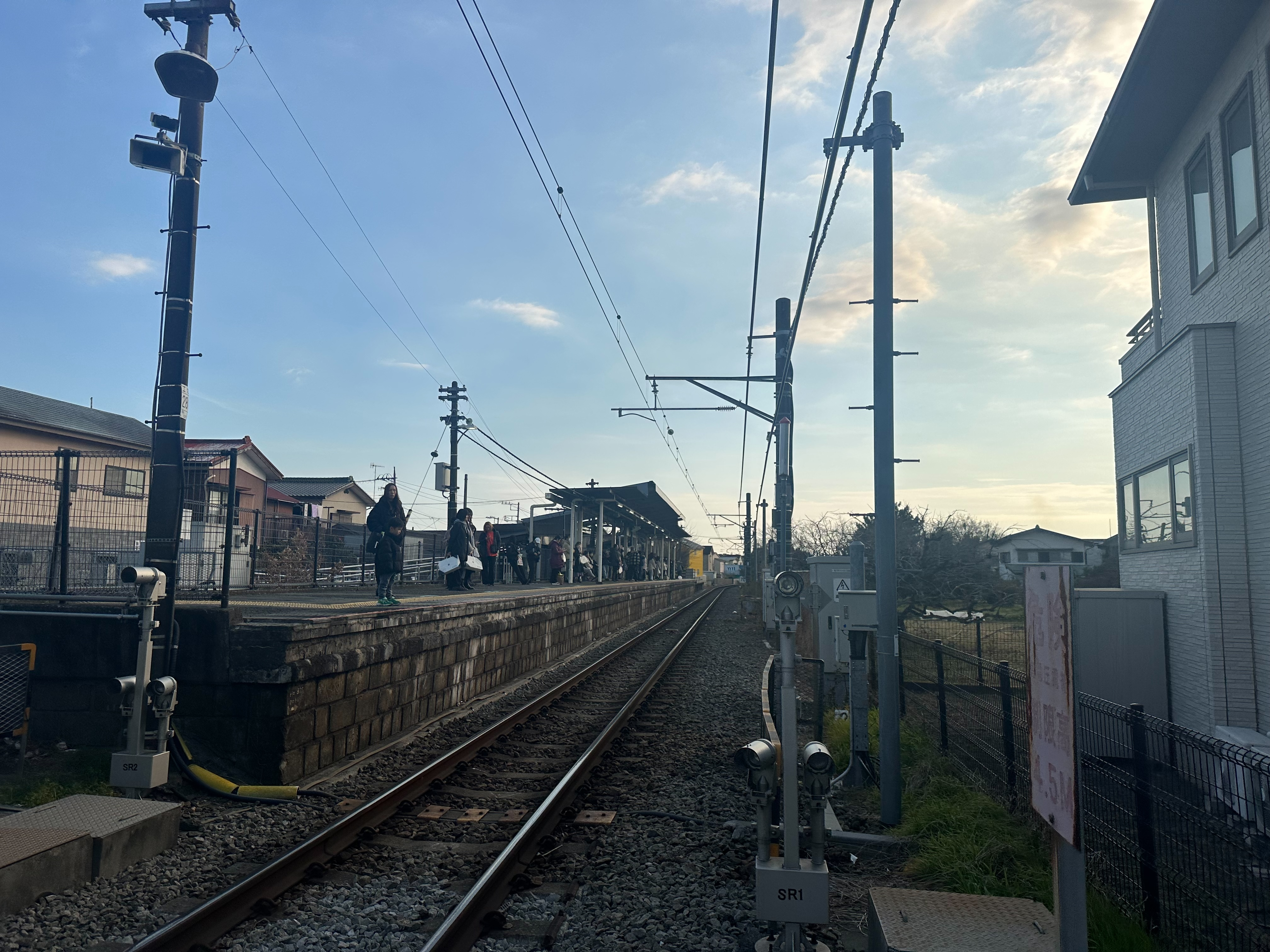
Miyayama Station platform in 2024

Miyayama Station (宮山駅, Miyayama-eki) is a passenger railway station located in the town of Samukawa, Kōza District. Kanagawa Prefecture, Japan and is operated by the East Japan Railway Company (JR East).

== Lines ==
Miyayama Station is served by the Sagami Line, and is located 7.2 kilometers from the terminal station of the line at Chigasaki.

== Station layout ==
The station consists of a single side platform and station building on the eastern side of the line. The station is unattended.

== History ==
The Sagami Railway Company opened a halt at Miyayama on 1 July 1931 at the request of local inhabitants and worshippers at the nearby Samukawa Shrine. On 1 June 1944 the company was nationalized and the Sagami Line became part of the Japanese Government Railways system (later Japanese National Railways, JNR). On the same date, Miyayama was elevated to full station status. On 1 April 1987, with the dissolution and privatization of JNR, ownership of the station passed to JR East. Automated turnstiles using the Suica IC card system were introduced in November 2001.

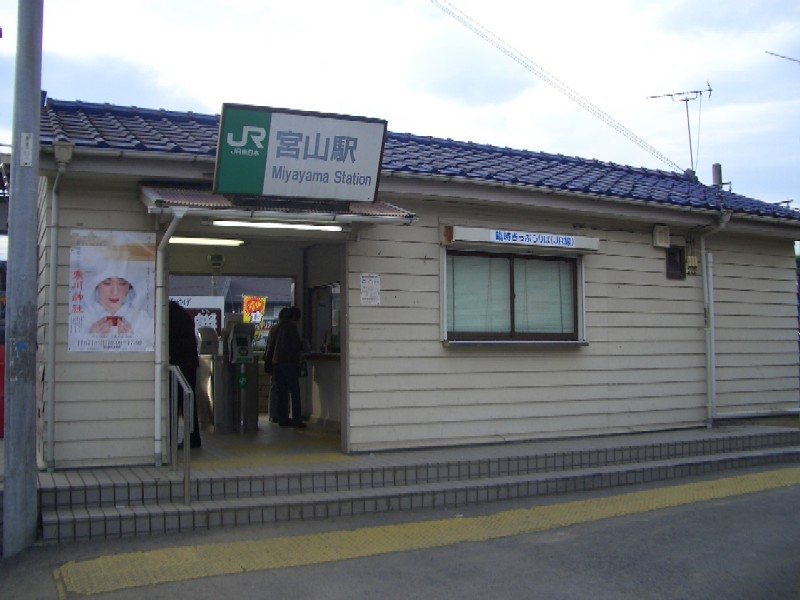
The station in 2004 before being remodeled in 2023.

== Passenger statistics ==
In fiscal 2014, the station was used by an average of 2,210 passengers daily (boarding passengers only).

== Surrounding area ==
- Samukawa Shrine
- Samukawa water purification plant

== See also ==
- List of railway stations in Japan
