= Kagawa Station (Kanagawa) =

Railway station in Chigasaki, Kanagawa Prefecture, Japan

Kagawa Station 香川駅
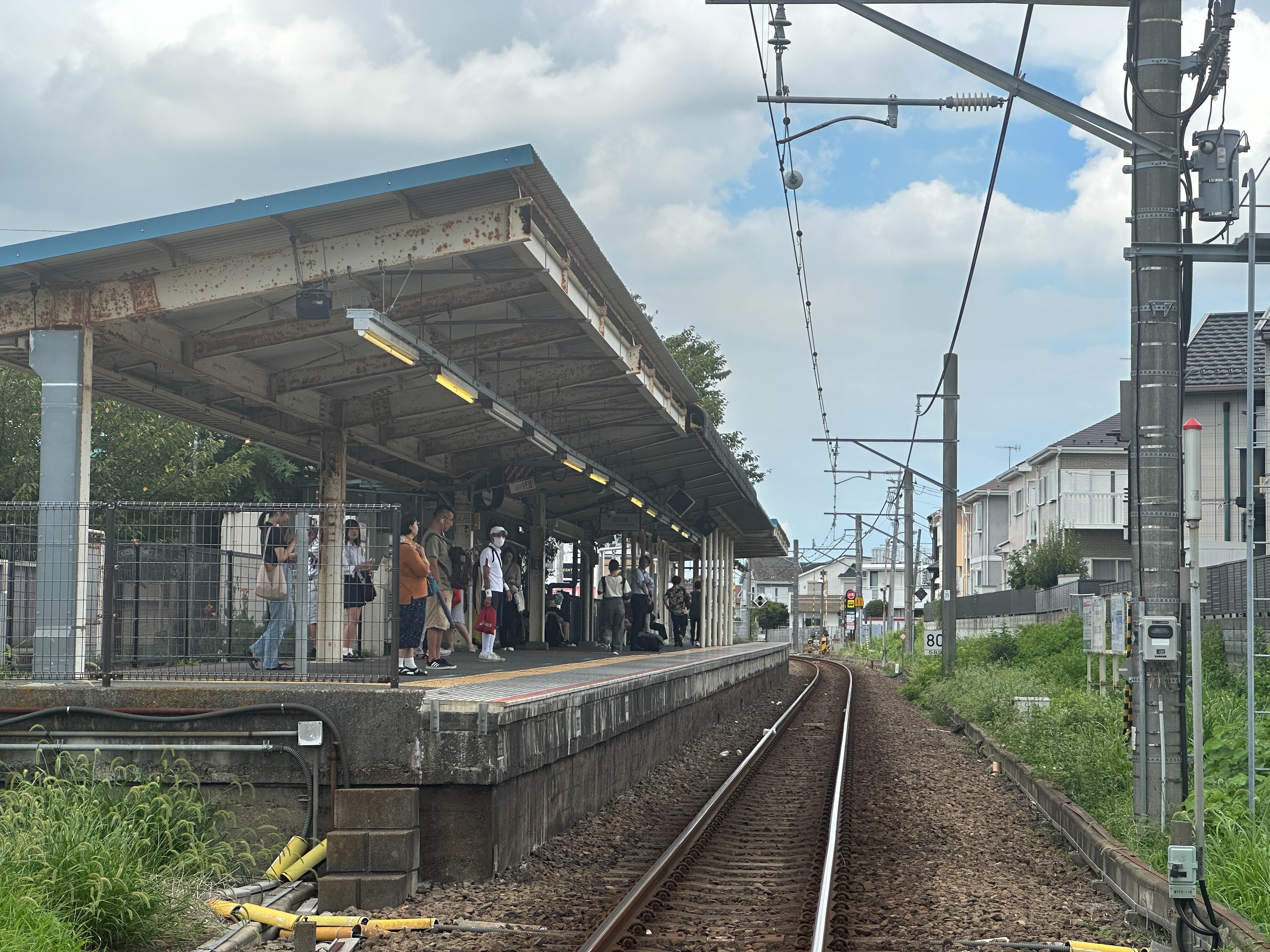
- Kagawa Station, 2023

General information
- Location: Kagawa 5-1-1, Chigasaki-shi, Kanagawa-ken 253-0082; Japan
- Coordinates: 35°21′23.4″N 139°23′59.2″E
- Operator: JR East
- Line: ■ Sagami Line
- Distance: 3.4 km from Chigasaki.
- Platforms: 1 side platform
- Connections

Other information
- Status: Staffed
- Website: Official website

History
- Opened: September 28, 1921

Passengers
- FY2019: 5,709 daily (boarding passengers)

Services
Preceding station	JR East	Following station
Samukawa towards Hachiōji	Sagami Line	Kita-Chigasaki towards Chigasaki
Location
- Location within Kanagawa Prefecture Location within Japan

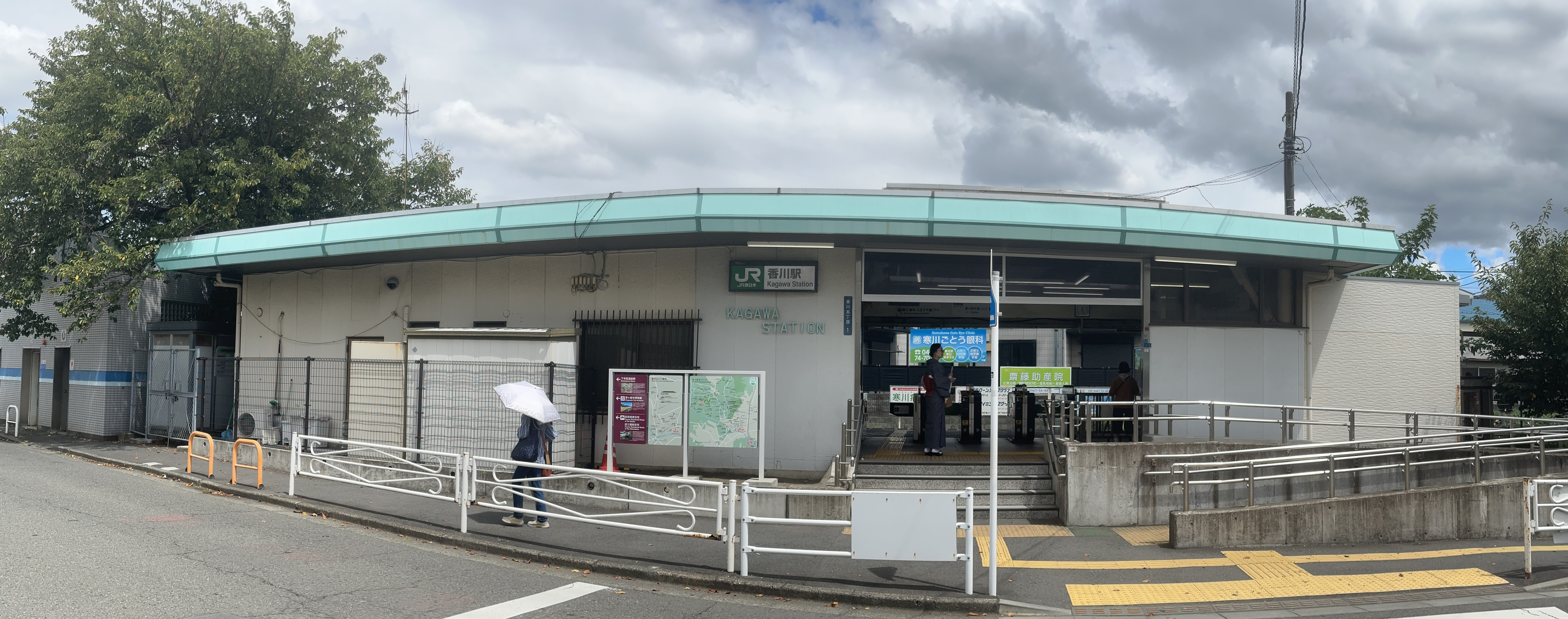
Kagawa Station building in 2023

Kagawa Station (香川駅, Kagawa-eki) is a passenger railway station located in the city of Chigasaki, Kanagawa Prefecture, Japan, operated by the East Japan Railway Company (JR East).

== Lines ==
Kagawa Station is served by the Sagami Line, and is located 3.4 kilometers from the terminus of the line at Chigasaki.

== Station layout ==
The station consists of a single side platform serving one bi-directional track. The station is staffed.

== History ==
Kagawa Station was opened on September 28, 1921, as a station the Sagami Railway. On June 1, 1944, the Sagami Railway was nationalized and merged with the Japan National Railways. On April 1, 1987, with the dissolution and privatization of the Japan National Railways, the station came under the operation of JR East. Automated turnstiles using the Suica IC card system came into operation from November 2001.

== Passenger statistics ==
In fiscal 2019, the station was used by an average of 5,709 passengers daily (boarding passengers only).

The passenger figures (boarding passengers only) for previous years are as shown below.

Fiscal year	daily average
2005	4,140
2010	4,781
2015	5,080

== Surrounding area ==
- Chigasaki City Hall Kagawa Branch Office
- Kayagasaki Satoyama Park
- Chigasaki New Hokuryo Hospital
- Nagaoka Hospital
- Kanagawa Prefectural Chigasaki Hokuryo High School
- Bunkyo University Shonan Campus

== See also ==
- List of railway stations in Japan
