= Samukawa =

Samukawa 寒川町
- Town
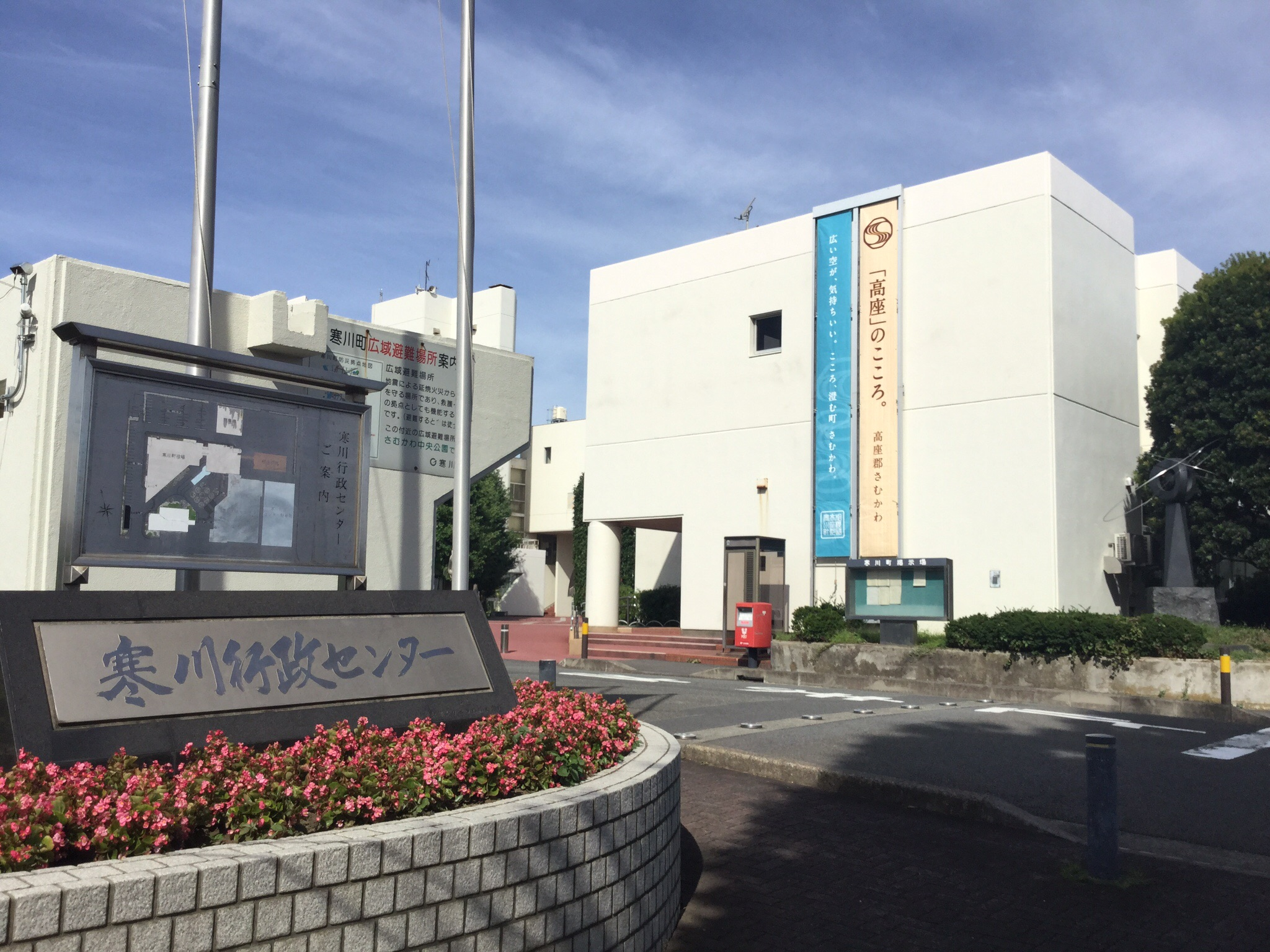
- Samukawa Town Hall

- Flag Emblem

- Location of Samukawa in Kanagawa Prefecture

- Coordinates: 35°22′36″N 139°23′05″E
- Country: Japan
- Region: Kantō
- Prefecture: Kanagawa
- District: Kōza

Area
  - Total: 13.42 km^{2} (5.18 sq mi)

Population (June 1, 2021)
  - Total: 48,679
  - Density: 3,627/km^{2} (9,395/sq mi)
- Time zone: UTC+9 (Japan Standard Time)
- Tree: Osmanthus
- Flower: Narcissus
- Bird: Great egret
- Phone number: 0467-74-1111
- Address: 165 Miyayama, Samukawa-machi, Kōza-gun, Kanagawa-ken 253-0196
- Website: Official website

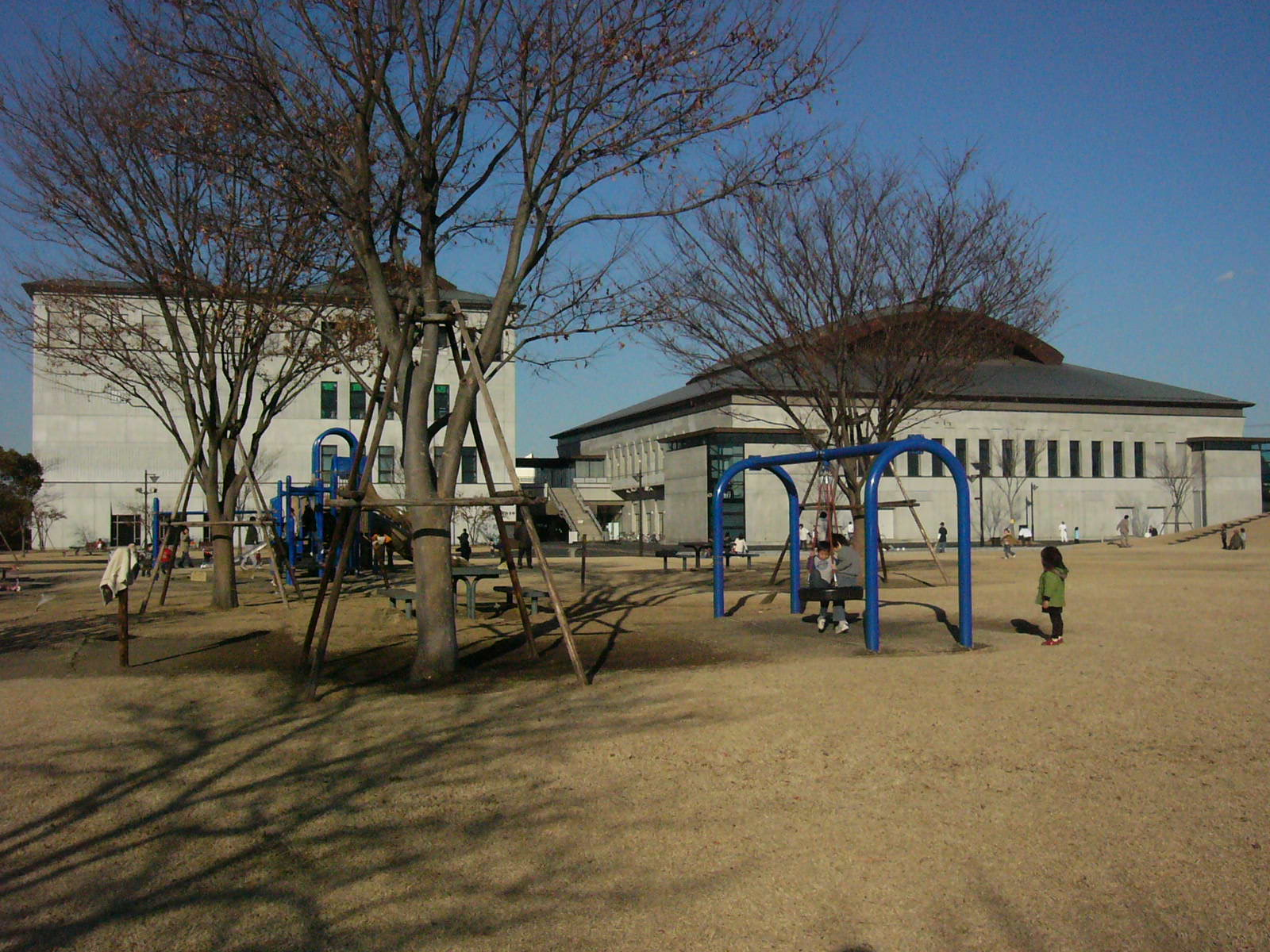
Samukawa Central Park

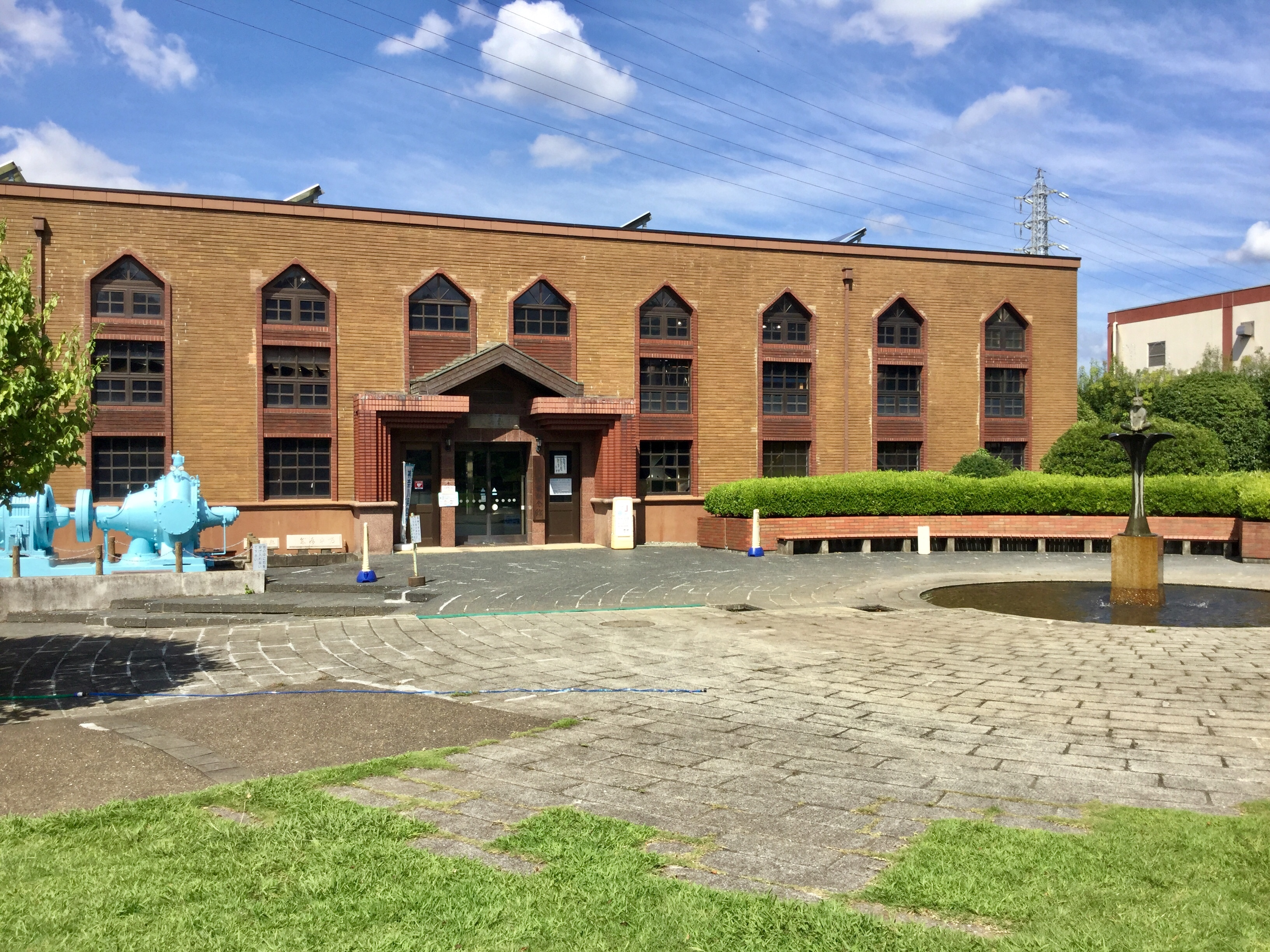
Kanagawa Waterworks Museum

Samukawa (寒川町, Samukawa-machi) is a town located in Kanagawa Prefecture, Japan. As of 1 June 2021, the town had an estimated population of 48,679 and a population density of 3600 persons per km^{2}. The total area of the town is 13.42 square kilometres (5.18 sq mi).

== Geography ==
Samukawa is located in the flatlands of central Kanagawa Prefecture. The Sagami River passes through the town.

=== Surrounding municipalities ===
Kanagawa Prefecture

- Atsugi
- Chigasaki
- Ebina
- Fujisawa
- Hiratsuka

=== Climate ===
Samukawa has a humid subtropical climate (Köppen Cfa) characterized by warm summers and cool winters with light to no snowfall. The average annual temperature in Samukawa is 15.2 °C. The average annual rainfall is 1872 mm with September as the wettest month. The temperatures are highest on average in August, at around 25.6 °C, and lowest in January, at around 5.2 °C.

== Demographics ==
Per Japanese census data, the population of Samukawa has recently plateaued after a long period of growth.

Historical population
Year	Pop.	±%
1920	5,364	—
1930	5,948	+10.9%
1940	6,772	+13.9%
1950	11,206	+65.5%
1960	11,564	+3.2%
1970	22,946	+98.4%
1980	36,417	+58.7%
1990	44,532	+22.3%
2000	46,369	+4.1%
2010	47,672	+2.8%
2020	48,348	+1.4%

== History ==
The village of Samukawa was founded in 1889 with the establishment of the modern municipalities system. It was linked with Chigasaki Station by the Sagami Line in 1921. A spur line extending from Samukawa to the west led to development of housing and industry, increasing the population of Samukawa such that by 1940 it was granted town status. The Sagami Naval Arsenal of the Imperial Japanese Navy was located in Samukawa until the end of World War II. In 2002, a large quantity of mustard gas was found buried under its former site.

== Government ==
Samukawa has a mayor-council form of government with a directly elected mayor and a unicameral town council of 18 members. Samukawa contributes one member to the Kanagawa Prefectural Assembly. In terms of national politics, the town is part of Kanagawa 12th district of the lower house of the Diet of Japan.

== Economy ==
Samukawa has a mixed economy. Industry includes factories operated by Nissan Kohki, a subsidiary of Nissan Motors producing automotive engines.

== Education ==
Samukawa has five public elementary schools and three public middle schools operated by the town government. The town has one public high school operated by the Kanagawa Prefectural Board of Education

== Transportation ==
=== Railway ===
JR East - Sagami Line

- Samukawa - Miyayama - Kurami

=== Highway ===
- Ken-Ō Expressway
- Kanagawa Prefectural Routes 44, 45, 46, and 47

== Local attractions ==
- Samukawa Shrine, the first shrine (ichinomiya) of former Sagami Province
