= Kōza District =

District in Kanagawa Prefecture, Japan

Coordinates: 35°22′27″N 139°23′27″E

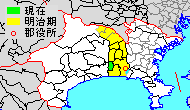
Map of Kōza District with Meiji period area in yellow, modern area in green 1 - Samukawa

Kōza District (高座郡, Kōza-gun) is a district located in central Kanagawa Prefecture, Japan. It currently consists of only one town, Samukawa. The entire cities of Chigasaki, Fujisawa, Yamato, Ayase, Ebina, Zama; and parts of the city of Sagamihara, were formerly part of Kōza District.

As of 2009, the district has an estimated population of 47,812 and a density of 3,560 persons per km^{2}. The total area is 13.42 km^{2}.

== Towns and villages ==
- Samukawa

== History ==
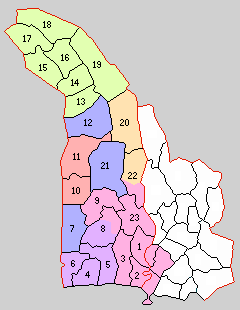
Historic Map of Kōza District

Kōza District was one of the ancient subdivisions of Sagami Province, extending from Sagami Bay north to the border of Musashi Province between the Sagami River and the Sakai River. It was mentioned in the Nihon Shoki records of 675 AD in the Nara period as Takakura District (高倉郡, Takakura-gun). The provincial capital of Sagami Province and its kokubunji were located within Kōza District, although its exact location is today unknown.

The area was under the control of various shōen from the Heian period through the Sengoku period, and was held as tenryō territory administered by the shōgun under the Tokugawa shogunate of the Edo period.

=== Timeline ===
After the Meiji Restoration, it was established as a district under the cadastral reform of 1878, with a district office built near what is now part of Chigasaki. This was moved to Fujisawa-Ōsaka Town (present-day Fujisawa) in 1906.

- On April 1, 1889, Kōza District was divided into one town (Fujisawa-Ōsaka) and 22 villages. In 1908, Chigasaki Village became a town, as did Kamimizo in 1928, and Zama in 1937. Fujisawa became a city in 1940. Samukawa and Ebina became towns the same year. In 1941, Zama, Kamimizo and six neighboring villages merged to form the town of Sagamihara. Yamato became a town in 1943, Shibuya in 1944 and Ayase in 1945. Chigasaki became a city in 1947.
- In 1948, Zama was separated from Sagamihara, which became a city in 1954.
- The town of Shibuya dissolved in 1955, with the southern portions merging with Fujisawa, and the northern portion reverting to the status of village until absorbed by Yamato town in 1956. Yamato became a city in 1959, and both Ebina and Zama became cities in 1971, and Ayase in 1978, leaving Samukawa as the only remaining component of Kōza District.

=== Merger table ===
pre-1889	April 1, 1889	1889 - 1926		1926 - 1944		1945 - 1954	1955 - 1989			1989–Present	Present
	Samukawa village	Samukawa village		November 1, 1940; Samukawa town		Samukawa town	Samukawa town			Samukawa town	Samukawa
	Chigasaki village	October 1, 1908; Chigasaki town		Chigasaki town		October 1, 1947; Chigasaki city	Chigasaki city			Chigasaki city	Chigasaki
	Shorin village	October 1, 1908; Chigasaki town		Chigasaki town		October 1, 1947; Chigasaki city	Chigasaki city			Chigasaki city	Chigasaki
	Tsurumine village	October 1, 1908; Chigasaki town		Chigasaki town		October 1, 1947; Chigasaki city	Chigasaki city			Chigasaki city	Chigasaki
	Koide village	Koide village		Koide village		Koide village	April 5, 1955 merged with Chigasaki city (except for Endo division)			Chigasaki city	Chigasaki
	Koide village	Koide village		Koide village		Koide village	April 5, 1955 merged with Fujisawa city (Endo division)			Fujisawa city	Fujisawa
	Fujisawa-Ōsaka town	Fujisawa-Ōsaka town	April 1, 1908; Fujisawa town	October 1, 1940; Fujisawa city		Fujisawa city	Fujisawa city			Fujisawa city	Fujisawa
	Kamakura District; Fujisawa-Ōtomi town	October 1, 1907 merge with Fujisawa-Ōsaka town	April 1, 1908; Fujisawa town	October 1, 1940; Fujisawa city		Fujisawa city	Fujisawa city			Fujisawa city	Fujisawa
	Kugenuma village	Kugenuma village	April 1, 1908; Fujisawa town	October 1, 1940; Fujisawa city		Fujisawa city	Fujisawa city			Fujisawa city	Fujisawa
	Meiji village	Meiji village	April 1, 1908; Fujisawa town	October 1, 1940; Fujisawa city		Fujisawa city	Fujisawa city			Fujisawa city	Fujisawa
	Mutsuai village	Mutsuai village		March 10, 1942 merge with Fujisawa city		Fujisawa city	Fujisawa city			Fujisawa city	Fujisawa
	Goshomi village	Goshomi village		Goshomi village		Goshomi village	April 5, 1955 merge with Fujisawa city			Fujisawa city	Fujisawa
	Shibuya village	Shibuya village		November 3, 1944; Shibuya town		Shibuya town	April 5, 1955 merged with Fujisawa city (southern portion)			Fujisawa city	Fujisawa
	Shibuya village	Shibuya village		November 3, 1944; Shibuya town		Shibuya town	April 5, 1955; Shibuya town (northern portion)	September 1, 1956 merge with Yamato town	February 1, 1959; Yamato city	Yamato city	Yamato
	Tsurumi village	September 25, 1891; Yamato village		November 3, 1943; Yamato town		Yamato town	Yamato town		February 1, 1959; Yamato city	Yamato city	Yamato
	Ayase village	Ayase village		Ayase village		April 1, 1945; Ayase town	November 1, 1978; Ayase city			Ayase city	Ayase
	Ebina village	Ebina village		December 20, 1940; Ebina town		Ebina town	Ebina town		November 1, 1971; Ebina city	Ebina city	Ebina
	Arima village	Arima village		Arima village		Arima village	April 20, 1955 merge with Ebina town		November 1, 1971; Ebina city	Ebina city	Ebina
	Zama village	Zama village		December 20, 1937; Zama town	April 29, 1941; Sagamihara town	September 1, 1948; Zama village	November 1, 1971; Zama city			Zama city	Zama
	Araiso village	Araiso village		Araiso village	April 29, 1941; Sagamihara town	November 20, 1954; Sagamihara city	Sagamihara city			Sagamihara city	Sagamihara
	Asamizo village	Asamizo village		Asamizo village	April 29, 1941; Sagamihara town	November 20, 1954; Sagamihara city	Sagamihara city			Sagamihara city	Sagamihara
	Tana village	Tana village		Tana village	April 29, 1941; Sagamihara town	November 20, 1954; Sagamihara city	Sagamihara city			Sagamihara city	Sagamihara
	Mizo village	Mizo village		January 1, 1928; Kamimizo town	April 29, 1941; Sagamihara town	November 20, 1954; Sagamihara city	Sagamihara city			Sagamihara city	Sagamihara
	Osawa village	Osawa village		Osawa village	April 29, 1941; Sagamihara town	November 20, 1954; Sagamihara city	Sagamihara city			Sagamihara city	Sagamihara
	Aihara village	Aihara village		Aihara village	April 29, 1941; Sagamihara town	November 20, 1954; Sagamihara city	Sagamihara city			Sagamihara city	Sagamihara
	Ono Village	Ono Village		Ono Village	April 29, 1941; Sagamihara town	November 20, 1954; Sagamihara city	Sagamihara city			Sagamihara city	Sagamihara
